= Cinema Audio Society Award for Outstanding Achievement in Sound Mixing for a Motion Picture – Live Action =

Annual US film award

- Country: United States
- Presented by: Cinema Audio Society
- Currently held by: Tod A. Maitland, Paul Massey, David Giammarco, Nick Baxter, David Betancourt, Kevin Schultz – A Complete Unknown (2024)

The Cinema Audio Society Award for Outstanding Achievement in Sound Mixing for a Motion Picture – Live Action is an annual award given by the Cinema Audio Society to live-action motion picture sound mixer for their outstanding achievements in sound mixing. The award came to its current title in 2013, when feature motion pictures were separated into two categories; achievement in live-action sound mixing, and achievement in animated sound mixing (later, documentary features would get their own category as well). Before this, the category was labeled Outstanding Achievement in Sound Mixing for Motion Pictures, and was given annually starting in 1994 (for films released the previous year).

== Winners and nominees ==
=== 1990s ===
Outstanding Achievement in Sound Mixing for Motion Pictures

Year	Film	Nominees
1993 (1st)	The Fugitive	Scott D. Smith (production mixer); Donald O. Mitchell, Michael Herbick, Frank A. Montaño (re-recording mixers)
1993 (1st)	Cliffhanger	Tim Cooney (production mixer); Bob Beemer, Michael Minkler (re-recording mixers)
1993 (1st)	In the Line of Fire	Willie D. Burton (production mixer); Kevin O'Connell, Rick Kline (re-recording mixers)
1993 (1st)	Jurassic Park	Ron Judkins (production mixer); Gary Rydstrom, Gary Summers, Shawn Murphy (re-recording mixers)
1993 (1st)	Schindler's List	Ron Judkins (production mixer); Andy Nelson, Steve Pederson, Scott Millan (re-recording mixers)
1994 (2nd)	Forrest Gump	William B. Kaplan (production mixer); Randy Thom, Tom Johnson, Dennis S. Sands (re-recording mixers)
1994 (2nd)	Clear and Present Danger	Art Rochester (production mixer); Donald O. Mitchell, Michael Herbick, Frank A. Montaño (re-recording mixers)
1994 (2nd)	The Lion King	Doc Kane (original dialogue mixer); Terry Porter, Mel Metcalfe, David J. Hudson (re-recording mixers)
1994 (2nd)	Speed	David MacMillan (production mixer); Gregg Landaker, Steve Maslow, Bob Beemer (re-recording mixers)
1994 (2nd)	True Lies	Lee Orloff (production mixer); Michael Minkler, Bob Beemer (re-recording mixers)
1995 (3rd)	Apollo 13	David MacMillan (production mixer); Rick Dior, Steve Pederson, Scott Millan (re-recording mixers)
1995 (3rd)	Braveheart	Brian Simmons (production mixer); Andy Nelson, Scott Millan, Anna Behlmer (re-recording mixers)
1995 (3rd)	Crimson Tide	William B. Kaplan (production mixer); Kevin O'Connell, Rick Kline, Gregory H. Watkins (re-recording mixers)
1995 (3rd)	Heat	Lee Orloff (production mixer); Chris Jenkins, Ron Bartlett, Mark Smith (re-recording mixers)
1995 (3rd)	Jumanji	Rob Young (production mixer); Randy Thom, Gary Summers, Shawn Murphy (re-recording mixers)
1996 (4th)	The English Patient	Christopher Newman (production mixer); Walter Murch, Mark Berger, David Parker (re-recording mixers)
1996 (4th)	The Birdcage	Gene Cantamessa (production mixer), Lee Dichter (re-recording mixer)
1996 (4th)	Independence Day	Jeff Wexler (production mixer); Chris Carpenter, Bob Beemer, Bill W. Benton (re-recording mixers)
1996 (4th)	The Rock	Keith A. Wester (production mixer); Kevin O'Connell, Greg P. Russell (re-recording mixers)
1996 (4th)	Twister	Geoffrey Patterson (production mixer); Steve Maslow, Gregg Landaker, Kevin O'Connell (re-recording mixers)
1997 (5th)	Titanic	Mark Ulano (production mixer); Gary Rydstrom, Tom Johnson, Gary Summers (re-recording mixers)
1997 (5th)	Air Force One	Keith A. Wester (production mixer); Paul Massey, Doug Hemphill, Rick Kline (re-recording mixers)
1997 (5th)	Contact	William B. Kaplan (production mixer); Randy Thom, Tom Johnson, Dennis S. Sands (re-recording mixers)
1997 (5th)	L.A. Confidential	Kirk Francis (production mixer); Andy Nelson, Anna Behlmer (re-recording mixers)
1997 (5th)	Men in Black	Peter Kurland (production mixer); Skip Lievsay, Lee Dichter, Michael Barry (re-recording mixers)
1998 (6th)	Saving Private Ryan	Ron Judkins (production mixer); Gary Rydstrom, Gary Summers, Andy Nelson (re-recording mixers)
1998 (6th)	Armageddon	Keith A. Wester (production mixer); Kevin O'Connell, Greg P. Russell (re-recording mixers)
1998 (6th)	The Horse Whisperer	Tod A. Maitland (production mixer); Tom Johnson, Lora Hirschberg, Dennis S. Sands (re-recording mixers)
1998 (6th)	The Mask of Zorro	Pud Cusack (production mixer); Kevin O'Connell, Greg P. Russell (re-recording mixers)
1998 (6th)	The X-Files	Geoffrey Patterson (production mixer); Andy Nelson, Anna Behlmer (re-recording mixers)
1999 (7th)	The Matrix	David Lee (production mixer); John T. Reitz, Gregg Rudloff, David E. Campbell (re-recording mixers)
1999 (7th)	American Beauty	Richard Van Dyke (production mixer); Scott Millan, Bob Beemer (re-recording mixers)
1999 (7th)	Any Given Sunday	Peter J. Devlin (production mixer); Patrick Cyccone Jr., Michael Keller, Tom Fleischman (re-recording mixers)
1999 (7th)	The Sixth Sense	Allan Byer (production mixer); Reilly Steele, Michael Kirchberger (re-recording mixers)
1999 (7th)	Star Wars: Episode I – The Phantom Menace	John Midgley (production mixer); Gary Rydstrom, Tom Johnson, Shawn Murphy (re-recording mixers)

=== 2000s ===
Year	Film	Nominees
2000 (8th)	Gladiator	Ken Weston (production mixer); Scott Millan, Bob Beemer (re-recording mixers)
2000 (8th)	Cast Away	William B. Kaplan (production mixer); Randy Thom, Tom Johnson, Dennis S. Sands (re-recording mixers)
2000 (8th)	The Patriot	Lee Orloff (production mixer); Kevin O'Connell, Greg P. Russell (re-recording mixers)
2000 (8th)	The Perfect Storm	Keith A. Wester (production mixer); John T. Reitz, David E. Campbell, Gregg Rudloff (re-recording mixers)
2000 (8th)	U-571	Ivan Sharrock (production mixer); Steve Maslow, Gregg Landaker, Rick Kline (re-recording mixers)
2001 (9th)	The Lord of the Rings: The Fellowship of the Ring	Hammond Peek (production mixer); Christopher Boyes, Michael Semanick, Gethin Creagh (re-recording mixers)
2001 (9th)	Black Hawk Down	Chris Munro (production mixer); Michael Minkler, Myron Nettinga (re-recording mixers)
2001 (9th)	Moulin Rouge!	Guntis Sics (production mixer); Andy Nelson, Anna Behlmer, Roger Savage (re-recording mixers)
2001 (9th)	Pearl Harbor	Peter J. Devlin (production mixer); Kevin O'Connell, Greg P. Russell (re-recording mixers)
2001 (9th)	Shrek	Charleen Richards (production mixer); Andy Nelson, Anna Behlmer (re-recording mixers)
2002 (10th)	Road to Perdition	John Pritchett (production mixer); Scott Millan, Bob Beemer (re-recording mixers)
2002 (10th)	Catch Me if You Can	Ron Judkins (production mixer); Andy Nelson, Anna Behlmer (re-recording mixers)
2002 (10th)	Chicago	David Lee (production mixer); Michael Minkler, Dominick Tavella (re-recording mixers)
2002 (10th)	The Lord of the Rings: The Two Towers	Hammond Peek (production mixer); Christopher Boyes, Michael Semanick, Michael Hedges (re-recording mixers)
2002 (10th)	Spider-Man	Ed Novick (production mixer); Kevin O'Connell, Greg P. Russell (re-recording mixers)
2003 (11th)	Master and Commander: The Far Side of the World	Art Rochester (production mixer); Paul Massey, Doug Hemphill (re-recording mixers)
2003 (11th)	The Last Samurai	Jeff Wexler (production mixer); Andy Nelson, Anna Behlmer (re-recording mixers)
2003 (11th)	The Lord of the Rings: The Return of the King	Hammond Peek (production mixer); Christopher Boyes, Michael Semanick, Michael Hedges (re-recording mixers)
2003 (11th)	Pirates of the Caribbean: The Curse of the Black Pearl	Lee Orloff (production mixer); Christopher Boyes, David Parker, David E. Campbell (re-recording mixers)
2003 (11th)	Seabiscuit	Tod A. Maitland (production mixer); Andy Nelson, Anna Behlmer (re-recording mixers)
2004 (12th)	The Aviator	Petur Hliddal (production mixer), Tom Fleischman (re-recording mixer)
2004 (12th)	The Bourne Supremacy	Kirk Francis (production mixer); Scott Millan, Bob Beemer (re-recording mixers)
2004 (12th)	Finding Neverland	David Crozier (production mixer); Lora Hirschberg, Brandon Proctor (re-recording mixers)
2004 (12th)	Ray	Steve Cantamessa (production mixer); Scott Millan, Greg Orloff, Bob Beemer (re-recording mixers)
2004 (12th)	Spider-Man 2	Joseph Geisinger (production mixer); Kevin O'Connell, Greg P. Russell, Jeffrey J. Haboush (re-recording mixers)
2005 (13th)	Walk the Line	Peter Kurland (production mixer); Paul Massey, Doug Hemphill (re-recording mixers)
2005 (13th)	Crash	Richard Van Dyke (production mixer); Marc Fishman, Adam Jenkins, Rick Ash (re-recording mixers)
2005 (13th)	King Kong	Hammond Peek (production mixer); Christopher Boyes, Michael Semanick, Michael Hedges (re-recording mixers)
2005 (13th)	Memoirs of a Geisha	John Pritchett (production mixer); Kevin O'Connell, Greg P. Russell, Rick Kline (re-recording mixers)
2005 (13th)	War of the Worlds	Ron Judkins (production mixer); Andy Nelson, Anna Behlmer (re-recording mixers)
2006 (14th)	Dreamgirls	Willie D. Burton (production mixer); Michael Minkler, Bob Beemer (re-recording mixers)
2006 (14th)	Babel	José Antonio García (production mixer); Jon Taylor, Christian P. Minkler (re-recording mixers)
2006 (14th)	Blood Diamond	Ivan Sharrock (production mixer); Andy Nelson, Anna Behlmer (re-recording mixers)
2006 (14th)	Flags of Our Fathers	Walt Martin (production mixer); John T. Reitz, Gregg Rudloff, David E. Campbell (re-recording mixers)
2006 (14th)	Pirates of the Caribbean: Dead Man's Chest	Lee Orloff (production mixer); Christopher Boyes, Paul Massey (re-recording mixers)
2007 (15th)	No Country for Old Men	Peter Kurland (production mixer); Skip Lievsay, Craig Berkey, Greg Orloff (re-recording mixer)
2007 (15th)	The Bourne Ultimatum	Kirk Francis (production mixer); Scott Millan, David Parker (re-recording mixers)
2007 (15th)	Into the Wild	Edward Tise (production mixer); Lora Hirschberg, Michael Minkler (re-recording mixers)
2007 (15th)	300	Patrick Rousseau (production mixer); Chris Jenkins, Frank A. Montaño (re-recording mixers)
2007 (15th)	Transformers	Peter J. Devlin (production mixer); Kevin O'Connell, Greg P. Russell (re-recording mixers)
2008 (16th)	Slumdog Millionaire	Resul Pookutty (production mixer); Ian Tapp, Richard Pryke (re-recording mixers)
2008 (16th)	The Dark Knight	Ed Novick (production mixer); Lora Hirschberg, Gary A. Rizzo (re-recording mixers)
2008 (16th)	Iron Man	Mark Ulano (production mixer); Christopher Boyes, Lora Hirschberg (re-recording mixers)
2008 (16th)	Quantum of Solace	Chris Munro (production mixer); Mike Prestwood Smith, Mark Taylor (re-recording mixers)
2008 (16th)	WALL-E	Ben Burtt (original dialogue mixer); Tom Myers, Michael Semanick (re-recording mixers)
2009 (17th)	The Hurt Locker	Ray Beckett (production mixer), Paul N. J. Ottosson (re-recording mixer)
2009 (17th)	Avatar	Tony Johnson (production mixer); Christopher Boyes, Gary Summers, Andy Nelson (re-recording mixers)
2009 (17th)	District 9	Ken Saville (production mixer); Michael Hedges, Gilbert Lake (re-recording mixers)
2009 (17th)	Star Trek	Peter J. Devlin (production mixer); Andy Nelson, Anna Behlmer, Paul Massey (re-recording mixers)
2009 (17th)	Transformers: Revenge of the Fallen	Geoffrey Patterson (production mixer); Greg P. Russell, Gary Summers (re-recording mixers)

=== 2010s ===
Year	Film	Nominees
2010 (18th)	True Grit	Peter Kurland (production mixer); Skip Lievsay, Craig Berkey, Greg Orloff (re-recording mixers)
2010 (18th)	Black Swan	Ken Ishii (production mixer); Dominick Tavella, Craig Henighan (re-recording mixers)
2010 (18th)	Inception	Ed Novick (production mixer); Lora Hirschberg, Gary A. Rizzo (re-recording mixers)
2010 (18th)	Shutter Island	Petur Hliddal (production mixer), Tom Fleischman (re-recording mixer)
2010 (18th)	The Social Network	Mark Weingarten (production mixer); Ren Klyce, Michael Semanick, David Parker (re-recording mixers)
2011 (19th)	Hugo	John Midgley (production mixer); Tom Fleischman (re-recording mixer); Simon Rhodes (scoring mixer)
2011 (19th)	Hanna	Roland Winke (production mixer); Christopher Scarabosio, Craig Berkey (re-recording mixers); Andrew Dudman (scoring mixer)
2011 (19th)	Moneyball	Ed Novick (production mixer); Deb Adair, Ron Bochar, David Giammarco (re-recording mixers); Brad Haehnel (scoring mixer)
2011 (19th)	Pirates of the Caribbean: On Stranger Tides	Lee Orloff (production mixer); Christopher Boyes, Paul Massey (re-recording mixers); Alan Meyerson (scoring mixer)
2011 (19th)	Super 8	Mark Ulano (production mixer); Tom Johnson, Andy Nelson, Anna Behlmer (re-recording mixers); Dan Wallin (scoring mixer)

Outstanding Achievement in Sound Mixing for a Motion Picture – Live Action

Year	Film	Nominees
2012 (20th)	Les Misérables	Simon Hayes (production mixer); Andy Nelson, Mark Paterson (re-recording mixers); Jonathan Allen (scoring mixer); Robert Edwards (ADR mixer); Peter D. Smith (foley mixer)
2012 (20th)	The Hobbit: An Unexpected Journey	Tony Johnson (production mixer); Christopher Boyes, Michael Semanick, Michael Hedges (re-recording mixers); Peter Cobbin (scoring mixer); Chris Ward (ADR mixer); Peter D. Smith (foley mixer)
2012 (20th)	Lincoln	Ron Judkins (production mixer); Gary Rydstrom, Andy Nelson (re-recording mixers); Shawn Murphy (scoring mixer); Bobby Johanson (ADR mixer); Frank Rinella (foley mixer)
2012 (20th)	Skyfall	Stuart Wilson (production mixer); Scott Millan, Greg P. Russell (re-recording mixers); Simon Rhodes (scoring mixer); Peter Gleaves (ADR mixer); James Ashwill (foley mixer)
2012 (20th)	Zero Dark Thirty	Ray Beckett (production mixer); Paul N. J. Ottosson (re-recording mixer); Sam Okell (scoring mixer); Brian Smith (ADR mixer); John Sanacore (foley mixer)
2013 (21st)	Gravity	Chris Munro (production mixer); Skip Lievsay, Niv Adiri, Christopher Benstead (re-recording mixers); Gareth Cousins (scoring mixer); Chris Navarro, Thomas J. O'Connell (ADR mixers); Adam Mendez (foley mixer)
2013 (21st)	Captain Phillips	Chris Munro (production mixer); Mike Prestwood Smith, Chris Burdon, Mark Taylor (re-recording mixers); Al Clay (scoring mixer); Howard London (ADR mixer); Glen Gathard (foley mixer)
2013 (21st)	Inside Llewyn Davis	Peter Kurland (production mixer); Skip Lievsay, Greg Orloff (re-recording mixers); Bobby Johanson (ADR mixer); George A. Lara (foley mixer)
2013 (21st)	Iron Man 3	José Antonio Garcia (production mixer); Mike Prestwood Smith, Michael Keller (re-recording mixers); Joel Iwataki (scoring mixer); Greg Steele (ADR mixer); James Ashwill (foley mixer)
2013 (21st)	Lone Survivor	David Brownlow (production mixer); Andy Koyama, Beau Borders (re-recording mixers); Satoshi Mark Noguchi (scoring mixer); Greg Steele (ADR mixer); Nerses Gezalyan (foley mixer)
2014 (22nd)	Birdman or (The Unexpected Virtue of Ignorance)	Thomas Varga (production mixer); Jon Taylor, Frank A. Montaño (re-recording mixers); Gustavo Borner (scoring mixer); Jason Oliver (ADR mixer); John Sanacore (foley mixer)
2014 (22nd)	American Sniper	Walt Martin (production mixer); Gregg Rudloff, John T. Reitz (re-recording mixers); Robert Fernandez (scoring mixer); Thomas J. O'Connell (ADR mixer); James Ashwill (foley mixer)
2014 (22nd)	Guardians of the Galaxy	Simon Hayes (production mixer); Christopher Boyes, Lora Hirschberg (re-recording mixers); Gustavo Borner (scoring mixer); Doc Kane (ADR mixer); Chris Manning (foley mixer)
2014 (22nd)	Interstellar	Mark Weingarten (production mixer); Gary A. Rizzo, Gregg Landaker (re-recording mixers); Alan Meyerson (scoring mixer); Thomas J. O'Connell (ADR mixer); Mary Jo Lang (foley mixer)
2014 (22nd)	Unbroken	David Lee (production mixer); Jon Taylor, Frank A. Montaño (re-recording mixers); Jonathan Allen (scoring mixer); Paul Drenning (ADR mixer); John Guentner (foley mixer)
2015 (23rd)	The Revenant	Chris Duesterdiek (production mixer); Randy Thom, Jon Taylor, Frank A. Montaño (re-recording mixers); Conrad Hensel (scoring mixer); Michael Miller (ADR mixer); Geordy Sincavage (foley mixer)
2015 (23rd)	Bridge of Spies	Drew Kunin (production mixer); Gary Rydstrom, Andy Nelson (re-recording mixers); Thomas Vicari (scoring mixer); Bobby Johanson (ADR mixer); Chris Manning (foley mixer)
2015 (23rd)	The Hateful Eight	Mark Ulano (production mixer); Michael Minkler, Christian P. Minkler (re-recording mixers); Fabio Venturi (scoring mixer); Nerses Gezalyan (foley mixer)
2015 (23rd)	Mad Max: Fury Road	Ben Osmo (production mixer); Chris Jenkins, Gregg Rudloff (re-recording mixers); Thomas J. O'Connell (ADR mixer); Ryan Squires (foley mixer)
2015 (23rd)	Star Wars: The Force Awakens	Stuart Wilson (production mixer); Christopher Scarabosio, Andy Nelson (re-recording mixers); Shawn Murphy (scoring mixer); Charleen Richards (ADR mixer); Chris Manning (foley mixer)
2016 (24th)	La La Land	Steven A. Morrow (production mixer); Andy Nelson, Ai-Ling Lee (re-recording mixers); Nicholai Baxter (scoring mixer); David Betancourt (ADR mixer); James Ashwill (foley mixer)
2016 (24th)	Doctor Strange	John Midgley (production mixer); Tom Johnson, Juan Peralta (re-recording mixers); Peter Cobbin (scoring mixer); Doc Kane (ADR mixer); Scott Curtis (foley mixer)
2016 (24th)	Hacksaw Ridge	Peter Grace (production mixer); Kevin O'Connell, Andy Wright, Robert Mackenzie (re-recording mixers); Daniel Fresco (scoring mixer); Diego Ruiz (ADR mixer); Alex Francis (foley mixer)
2016 (24th)	Rogue One: A Star Wars Story	Stuart Wilson (production mixer); Christopher Scarabosio, David Parker (re-recording mixers); Joel Iwataki (scoring mixer); Nick Kray (ADR mixer); Frank Rinella (foley mixer)
2016 (24th)	Sully	José Antonio Garcia (production mixer); John T. Reitz, Tom Ozanich (re-recording mixers); Bobby Fernandez (scoring mixer); Thomas J. O'Connell (ADR mixer); James Ashwill (foley mixer)
2017 (25th)	Dunkirk	Mark Weingarten (production mixer); Gregg Landaker, Gary A. Rizzo (re-recording mixers); Alan Meyerson (scoring mixer); Thomas J. O'Connell (ADR mixer); Scott Curtis (foley mixer)
2017 (25th)	Baby Driver	Mary H. Ellis (production mixer); Julian Slater, Tim Cavagin (re-recording mixers); Gareth Cousins (scoring mixer); Mark Appleby (ADR mixer); Glen Gathard (foley mixer)
2017 (25th)	The Shape of Water	Glen Gauthier (production mixer); Christian T. Cooke, Brad Zoern, Robert Mackenzie (re-recording mixers); Peter Cobbin (scoring mixer); Chris Navarro (ADR mixer); Peter Persaud (foley mixer)
2017 (25th)	Star Wars: The Last Jedi	Stuart Wilson (production mixer); Ren Klyce, Michael Semanick, David Parker (re-recording mixers); Shawn Murphy (scoring mixer); Doc Kane (ADR mixer); Frank Rinella (foley mixer)
2017 (25th)	Wonder Woman	Chris Munro (production mixer); Chris Burdon, Gilbert Lake (re-recording mixers); Alan Meyerson (scoring mixer); Nick Kray (ADR mixer); Glen Gathard (foley mixer)
2018 (26th)	Bohemian Rhapsody	John Casali (production mixer); Paul Massey, Tim Cavagin, Niv Adiri (re-recording mixers); Alan Meyerson (scoring mixer); Thomas J. O'Connell (ADR mixer); Glen Gathard, Jemma Riley Tolch (foley mixers)
2018 (26th)	Black Panther	Peter J. Devlin (production mixer); Steve Boeddeker, Brandon Proctor (re-recording mixers); Christopher Fogel (scoring mixer); Doc Kane (ADR mixer); Scott Curtis (foley mixer)
2018 (26th)	First Man	Mary H. Ellis (production mixer); Jon Taylor, Frank A. Montaño, Ai-Ling Lee (re-recording mixers); Nick Baxter (scoring mixer); Thomas J. O'Connell (ADR mixer); Richard Duarte (foley mixer)
2018 (26th)	A Quiet Place	Michael Barosky (production mixer); Brandon Proctor, Michael Barry (re-recording mixers); Tyson Lozensky (scoring mixer); Bob Lacivita (ADR mixer); Peter Persuad (foley mixer)
2018 (26th)	A Star Is Born	Steven A. Morrow (production mixer); Tom Ozanich, Dean A. Zupancic, Jason Ruder (re-recording mixers); Nick Baxter (scoring mixer); Thomas J. O'Connell (ADR mixer); Richard Duarte (foley mixer)
2019 (27th)	Ford v Ferrari	Steven A. Morrow (production mixer); David Giammarco, Paul Massey (re-recording mixers); Tyson Lozensky (scoring mixer); David Betancourt (ADR mixer); Richard Duarte (foley mixer)
2019 (27th)	The Irishman	Tod A. Maitland (production mixer); Tom Fleischman, Eugene Gearty (re-recording mixers); Mark DeSimone (ADR mixer); George A. Lara (foley mixer)
2019 (27th)	Joker	Tod A. Maitland (production mixer); Tom Ozanich, Dean A. Zupancic (re-recording mixers); Daniel Kresco (scoring mixer); Thomas J. O'Connell (ADR mixer); Richard Duarte (foley mixer)
2019 (27th)	Once Upon a Time in Hollywood	Mark Ulano (production mixer); Christian Minkler, Michael Minkler (re-recording mixers); Kyle Rochlin (foley mixer)
2019 (27th)	Rocketman	John Hayes (production mixer); Mathew Collinge, Mike Prestwood Smith (re-recording mixers); Mark Appleby (ADR mixer); Glen Gathard (foley mixer)

=== 2020s ===
Year	Film	Nominees
2020 (28th)	Sound of Metal	Phillip Bladh (production mixer); Jaime Baksht, Nicolas Becker, Michelle Couttolenc (re-recording mixers); Carlos Cortés Navarrete (ADR mixer); Kari Vähäkuopus (foley mixer)
2020 (28th)	Greyhound	David Wyman (production mixer); Beau Borders, Richard Kitting, Christian Minkler, Michael Minkler (re-recording mixers); Greg Hayes (scoring mixer); George A. Lara (foley mixer)
2020 (28th)	Mank	Drew Kunin (production mixer); Ren Klyce, David Parker, Nathan Nance (re-recording mixers); Alan Meyerson (scoring mixer); Charleen Richards-Steeves (ADR mixer); Scott Curtis (foley mixer)
2020 (28th)	News of the World	John Patrick Pritchett (production mixer); William Miller, Mike Prestwood Smith (re-recording mixers); Shawn Murphy (scoring mixer); Mark DeSimone (ADR mixer); Adam Fil Méndez (foley mixer)
2020 (28th)	The Trial of the Chicago 7	Thomas Varga (production mixer); Michael Babcock, Julian Slater (re-recording mixers); Daniel Pemberton (scoring mixer); Justin W. Walker (ADR mixer); Kevin Schultz (foley mixer)
2021 (29th)	Dune	Mac Ruth (production mixer); Ron Bartlett, Douglas Hemphill (re-recording mixers); Alan Meyerson (scoring mixer); Tommy O'Connell (ADR mixer); Don White (foley mixer)
2021 (29th)	No Time to Die	Simon Hayes (production mixer); Paul Massey, Mark Taylor (re-recording mixers); Stephen Lipson (scoring mixer); Mark Appleby (ADR mixer); Adam Mendez (foley mixer)
2021 (29th)	The Power of the Dog	Richard Flynn (production mixer); Robert Mackenzie, Tara Webb (re-recording mixers); Graeme Stewart (scoring mixer); Steve Burgess (foley mixer)
2021 (29th)	Spider-Man: No Way Home	Willie Burton (production mixer); Tony Lamberti, Kevin O’Connell (re-recording mixers); Warren Brown (scoring mixer); Howard London (ADR mixer); Randy K. Singer (foley mixer)
2021 (29th)	West Side Story	Tod A. Maitland (production mixer); Gary Rydstrom, Andy Nelson (re-recording mixers); Shawn Murphy (scoring mixer); Doc Kane (ADR mixer); Frank Rinella (foley mixer)
2022 (30th)	Top Gun: Maverick	Mark Weingarten (production mixer); Chris Burdon, Mark Taylor (re-recording mixers); Al Clay, Stephen Lipson (scoring mixers); Blake Collins (foley mixer)
2022 (30th)	All Quiet on the Western Front	Viktor Prášil (production mixer); Lars Ginzel, Stefan Korte (re-recording mixers); Daniel Kresco (scoring mixer); Jan Meyerdierks (ADR mixer); Hanse Warns (foley mixer)
2022 (30th)	Avatar: The Way of Water	Julian Howarth (production mixer); Christopher Boyes, Gary Summers, Michael Hedges (re-recording mixer); Simon Rhodes (scoring mixer); Bill Higley (ADR mixer); Tavish Grade (foley mixer)
2022 (30th)	The Batman	Stuart Wilson (production mixer); Will Files, Andy Nelson (re-recording mixers); Kirsty Whalley (scoring mixer); Ryan D. Young (ADR mixer); Darrin Mann (foley mixer)
2022 (30th)	Elvis	David Lee (production mixer); Andy Nelson, Michael Keller, Wayne Pashley (re-recording mixers); Geoff Foster (scoring mixer); Tami Treadwell (ADR mixer); Amy Barber (foley mixer)
2023 (31st)	Oppenheimer	Willie D. Burton (production mixer); Gary A. Rizzo, Kevin O'Connell (re-recording mixers); Chris Fogel (scoring mixer); Tavish Grade, Jack Cucci, Mikel Parraga-Wills (foley mixers)
2023 (31st)	Barbie	Nina Rice (production mixer); Kevin O'Connell, Ai-Ling Lee (re-recording mixers); Peter Cobbin, Kirsty Whalley (scoring mixers); Bobby Johanson (ADR mixer); Kevin Schultz (foley mixer)
2023 (31st)	Ferrari	Lee Orloff (production mixer); Andy Nelson, Tony Lamberti, Luke Schwarzweller (re-recording mixers); Andrew Dudman (scoring mixer); Matthew Wood (ADR mixer); Giorgi Lekishvili (foley mixer)
2023 (31st)	Killers of the Flower Moon	Mark Ulano (production mixer); Tom Fleischman, Eugene Gearty (re-recording mixers); George A. Lara (foley mixer)
2023 (31st)	Maestro	Steven A. Morrow (production mixer); Tom Ozanich, Dean A. Zupancic (re-recording mixers); Nick Baxter (scoring mixers); Bobby Johanson (ADR mixer); Walter Spencer (foley mixer)
2024 (32nd)	A Complete Unknown	Tod A. Maitland (production sound mixer); Paul Massey, David Giammarco (re-recording mixers); Nick Baxter (scoring mixer); David Betancourt (ADR mixer); Kevin Schultz (foley mixer)
2024 (32nd)	Deadpool & Wolverine	Colin Nicolson (production sound mixer); Lora Hirschberg, Craig Henighan (re-recording mixers); Peter Cobbin (scoring mixer); Bobby Johanson (ADR mixer); Peter Persaud (foley mixer)
2024 (32nd)	Dune: Part Two	Gareth John (production sound mixer); Ron Bartlett, Doug Hemphill (re-recording mixers); Alan Meyerson (scoring mixer); Jason Oliver (ADR mixer); Tavish Grade, Mikel Parraga-Wills (foley mixers)
2024 (32nd)	Gladiator II	Stephane Bucher (production sound mixer); Paul Massey, Matthew Collinge (re-recording mixers); Alan Meyerson (scoring mixer); Filipe Pereira (ADR mixer); Rob Weatherall (foley mixer)
2024 (32nd)	Wicked: Part One	Simon Hayes (production sound mixer); Andy Nelson, John Marquis (re-recording mixers); John Michael Caldwell (scoring mixer); Jason Oliver (ADR mixer); Mikel Parraga-Wills (foley mixer)

== See also ==
- Academy Award for Best Sound
- BAFTA Award for Best Sound
