= Satellite Award for Best Sound =

Award from the International Press Academy

- Awarded for: Best Sound
- Country: United States
- Presented by: International Press Academy
- First award: 1999
- Currently held by: Jack Dolman, Simon Hayes, John Marquis, Andy Nelson, and Nancy Nugent Title – Wicked (2024)
- Website: www.pressacademy.com

The Satellite Award for Best Sound is one of the annual Satellite Awards given by the International Press Academy.

== Winners and nominees ==
=== 1990s ===
| Year | Film | Recipient(s) |
|---|---|---|
| 1999 | Sleepy Hollow | Gary Alper, Skip Lievsay, and Frank Morrone |
| 1999 | Buena Vista Social Club | Jerry Boys, Martin Müller, and Elmo Weber |
| 1999 | The Emperor and the Assassin (Jing ke ci qin wang) | Jing Tao |
| 1999 | Eyes Wide Shut | Paul Conway and Edward Tise |
| 1999 | The Sixth Sense | Allan Byer and Michael Kirchberger |
| 1999 | Star Wars: Episode I – The Phantom Menace | Tom Bellfort and Matthew Wood |

=== 2000s ===
| Year | Film | Recipient(s) |
|---|---|---|
| 2000 | Dinosaur | Christopher Boyes and Frank E. Eulner |
| 2000 | Chicken Run | Graham Headicar and James Mather |
| 2000 | Crouching Tiger, Hidden Dragon (Wo hu cang long) | Eugene Gearty |
| 2000 | Mission: Impossible 2 | Mark P. Stoeckinger |
| 2000 | The Perfect Storm | Keith A. Wester |
| 2001 | The Lord of the Rings: The Fellowship of the Ring | Christopher Boyes, Gethin Creagh, Hammond Peek, and Michael Semanick |
| 2001 | Hedwig and the Angry Inch | Daniel Hamood |
| 2001 | Jurassic Park III | Christopher Boyes and Howell Gibbens |
| 2001 | Moulin Rouge! | Guntis Sics |
| 2001 | The Others | Tim Cavagin and Ricardo Steinberg |
| 2002 | Solaris | Larry Blake |
| 2002 | Gangs of New York | Philip Stockton |
| 2002 | The Lord of the Rings: The Two Towers | Christopher Boyes, Michael Hedges, Hammond Peek, and Michael Semanick |
| 2002 | Minority Report | Richard Hymns, Gary Rydstrom Andy Nelson, and Ron Judkins |
| 2002 | Signs | Richard King |
| 2003 | Master and Commander: The Far Side of the World | Doug Hemphill, Richard King, Paul Massey, and Art Rochester |
| 2003 | Kill Bill: Volume 1 | Michael Minkler, Myron Nettinga, Wylie Stateman, and Mark Ulano |
| 2003 | The Last Samurai | Mark P. Stoeckinger [wrong, please correct] |
| 2003 | The Lord of the Rings: The Return of the King | Christopher Boyes, Michael Semanick, Michael Hedges (sound engineer), and Hammond Peek |
| 2003 | Mystic River | Bub Asman, Christopher Boyes, Alan Robert Murray, Michael Semanick, and Gary Summers |
| 2003 | Seabiscuit | Anna Behlmer, Tod A. Maitland, and Andy Nelson |
| 2004 | Collateral | Elliott Koretz, Michael Minkler, Myron Nettinga, and Lee Orloff |
| 2004 | The Aviator | Tom Fleischman, Eugene Gearty, Petur Hliddal, and Philip Stockton |
| 2004 | Code 46 | Joakim Sundström |
| 2004 | House of Flying Daggers (Shi mian mai fu) | Jing Tao |
| 2004 | The Phantom of the Opera | Anna Behlmer, Tony Dawe, Martin Evans, and Andy Nelson |
| 2004 | Spider-Man 2 | Susan Dudeck, Joseph Geisinger, Jeffrey J. Haboush, Kevin O'Connell, Paul N. J. Ottosson, and Greg P. Russell |
| 2005 | Star Wars: Episode III – Revenge of the Sith | Paul Brincat, Ben Burtt, Tom Myers, Andy Nelson, Christopher Scarabosio, and Matthew Wood |
| 2005 | Kung Fu Hustle (Kung Fu) | Paul Pirola |
| 2005 | Rent | Sally Boldt and Rob Cavallo |
| 2005 | Sin City | Paula Fairfield, William Jacobs, Carla Murray, Sergio Reyes, John Pritchett, and Robert Rodriguez |
| 2005 | The White Countess | Michael Barry, Martin Czembor, Robert Hein, and Ludovic Hénault |
| 2006 | Dreamgirls | Bob Beemer, Willie D. Burton, Michael Minkler, and Richard E. Yawn |
| 2006 | Babel | José Antonio Garcia, Martin Hernández, Christian P. Minkler, and Jon Taylor |
| 2006 | The Da Vinci Code | Anthony J. Ciccolini III, Kevin O'Connell, and Greg P. Russell |
| 2006 | Flags of Our Fathers | Bub Asman, David E. Campbell, Walt Martin, Alan Robert Murray, John T. Reitz, and Gregg Rudloff |
| 2006 | X-Men: The Last Stand | Doug Hemphill, Rick Kline, John A. Larsen, and Steve Maslow |
| 2007 | The Bourne Ultimatum | Kirk Francis, Per Hallberg, Karen Baker Landers, Scott Millan, and David Parker |
| 2007 | 300 | Scott Hecker, Chris Jenkins, Frank A. Montaño, Eric A. Norris, and Patrick Rousseau |
| 2007 | The Golden Compass | Glenn Freemantle, Mike Prestwood Smith, and Mark Taylor |
| 2007 | I Am Legend | Rick Kline, Skip Lievsay, Tod A. Maitland, and Jeremy Peirson |
| 2007 | La Vie en Rose (La Môme) | Jean-Paul Hurier and Nikolas Javelle |
| 2007 | Pirates of the Caribbean: At World's End | Christopher Boyes, Paul Massey, Lee Orloff, and George Watters II |
| 2008 | The Dark Knight | Lora Hirschberg, Richard King, and Gary A. Rizzo |
| 2008 | Australia | Anna Behlmer, Andy Nelson, and Wayne Pashley |
| 2008 | The Day the Earth Stood Still | Bill R. Dean and David Husby |
| 2008 | Iron Man | Christopher Boyes, Frank E. Eulner, and Lora Hirschberg |
| 2008 | Quantum of Solace | Jimmy Boyle, Martin Cantwell, Eddy Joseph, Mike Prestwood Smith, and Mark Taylor |
| 2008 | WALL-E | Ben Burtt, Matthew Wood, Michael Semanick, and Tom Myers |
| 2009 | 2012 | Jeffrey J. Haboush, Michael Keller, Rick Kline, Michael McGee, and Paul N. J. Ottosson |
| 2009 | It Might Get Loud | Joel Dougherty and Chuck Fitzpatrick |
| 2009 | Nine | Roberto Fernandez, Jim Greenhorn, Wylie Stateman, and Renée Tondelli |
| 2009 | Red Cliff (Chi bi) | Steve Burgess and Roger Savage |
| 2009 | Terminator Salvation | Ron Bartlett, Cameron Frankley, Mark Ulano, and Richard Van Dyke |
| 2009 | Transformers: Revenge of the Fallen | Erik Aadahl, Geoffrey Patterson, Greg P. Russell, Gary Summers, and Ethan Van der Ryn |

=== 2010s ===
| Year | Film | Recipient(s) |
|---|---|---|
| 2010 | Unstoppable | Beau Borders, William B. Kaplan, Kevin O'Connell, and Mark P. Stoeckinger |
| 2010 | 127 Hours | Douglas Cameron, Glenn Freemantle, Steven C. Laneri, Richard Pryke, and Ian Tapp |
| 2010 | Inception | Lora Hirschberg, Richard King, Ed Novick, and Gary A. Rizzo |
| 2010 | Iron Man 2 | Christopher Boyes, Frank E. Eulner, and Lora Hirschberg |
| 2010 | Nowhere Boy | Simon Chase, Paul Cotterell, John Midgley, and Martin Trevis |
| 2010 | Secretariat | Kami Asgar, Beau Borders, David O. Daniel, Sean McCormack, and Kevin O'Connell |
| 2010 | Shutter Island | Tom Fleischman, Eugene Gearty, Petur Hliddal, and Philip Stockton |
| 2011 | Drive | Lon Bender, Robert Eber, Victor Ray Ennis, Robert Fernandez, and Dave Paterson |
| 2011 | Harry Potter and the Deathly Hallows – Part 2 | Mike Dowson, Stuart Hilliker, James Mather, Adam Scrivener, and Stuart Wilson |
| 2011 | Super 8 | Anna Behlmer, Ben Burtt, Andy Nelson, Mark Ulano, and Matthew Wood |
| 2011 | Transformers: Dark of the Moon | Erik Aadahl, Jeffrey J. Haboush, Greg P. Russell, Gary Summers, and Ethan Van der Ryn |
| 2011 | The Tree of Life | Erik Aadahl, Craig Berkey, Kirk Francis, Jeremy Peirson, John Pritchett, and Christopher Scarabosio |
| 2011 | War Horse | Richard Hymns, Tom Johnson, Andy Nelson, Gary Rydstrom, and Stuart Wilson |
| 2012 | Les Misérables | Simon Hayes, Andy Nelson, Lee Walpole, and John Warhurst |
| 2012 | Flight | William B. Kaplan, Dennis Leonard, Dennis S. Sands, and Randy Thom |
| 2012 | Kon-Tiki | Baard H. Ingebretsen and Tormod Ringnes |
| 2012 | Life of Pi | Ron Bartlett, Eugene Gearty, Drew Kunin, and Philip Stockton |
| 2012 | Prometheus | Ron Bartlett, Victor Ray Ennis, Simon Hayes, Doug Hemphill, and Mark P. Stoeckinger |
| 2012 | Snow White and the Huntsman | Craig Henighan, Chris Munro, and Andy Nelson |
| 2013 | Gravity | Niv Adiri, Glenn Freemantle, Skip Lievsay, and Chris Munro |
| 2013 | All Is Lost | Micah Bloomberg, Steve Boeddeker, Richard Hymns, and Brandon Proctor |
| 2013 | Captain Phillips | Chris Burdon, Chris Munro, Mike Prestwood Smith, Oliver Tarney, and Mark Taylor |
| 2013 | Elysium | Craig Berkey, David Husby, Christopher Scarabosio, and Dave Whitehead |
| 2013 | Inside Llewyn Davis | Peter Kurland, Skip Lievsay, Greg Orloff, and Paul Urmson |
| 2013 | Rush | Danny Hambrook, Frank Kruse, and Markus Stemler |
| 2014 | Whiplash | Thomas Curley, Craig Mann, and Ben Wilkins |
| 2014 | Gone Girl | Steve Cantamessa and Ren Klyce |
| 2014 | Into the Woods | John Casali, Michael Keller, Blake Leyh, Mike Prestwood Smith, and Renée Tondelli |
| 2014 | Noah | Craig Henighan, Ken Ishii, and Skip Lievsay |
| 2014 | Snowpiercer | Anna Behlmer, Taeyoung Choi, Mark Holding, and Terry Porter |
| 2014 | Transformers: Age of Extinction | Erik Aadahl, Peter J. Devlin, Jeffrey J. Haboush, Scott Millan, Greg P. Russell, and Ethan Van der Ryn |
| 2015 | The Martian | Paul Massey, Mac Ruth, Oliver Tarney, and Mark Taylor |
| 2015 | Inside Out | Tom Johnson, Doc Kane, Ren Klyce, Shannon Mills, and Michael Semanick |
| 2015 | Jurassic World | Christopher Boyes, Kirk Francis, Pete Horner, Al Nelson, and Gwendolyn Yates Whittle |
| 2015 | Mad Max: Fury Road | Scott Heckler, Chris Jenkins, Mark Mangini, Ben Osmo, Gregg Rudloff, and David White |
| 2015 | Sicario | Alan Robert Murray, Tom Ozanich, John T. Reitz, and William Sarokin |
| 2015 | Spectre | Per Hallberg, Karen Baker Landers, Scott Millan, Gregg Rudloff, and Stuart Wilson |
| 2016 | Hacksaw Ridge | Peter Grace, Robert Mackenzie, Kevin O'Connell, and Andy Wright |
| 2016 | 13 Hours: The Secret Soldiers of Benghazi | Erik Aadahl, Jeffrey J. Haboush, Greg P. Russell, Gary Summers, and Ethan Van der Ryn |
| 2016 | Allied | Brandon Proctor, Dennis S. Sands, Bjørn Ole Schroeder, and Randy Thom |
| 2016 | Billy Lynn's Long Halftime Walk | Ron Bartlett and Doug Hemphill |
| 2016 | The Jungle Book | Christopher Boyes, Frank E. Eulner, Lora Hirschberg, and Ron Judkins |
| 2016 | La La Land | Ai-Ling Lee, Mildred Iatrou Morgan, Steven A. Morrow, and Andy Nelson |
| 2017 | Dunkirk | Alex Gibson, Richard King, Gregg Landaker, Gary A. Rizzo, and Mark Weingarten |
| 2017 | Blade Runner 2049 | N/A |
| 2017 | Coco | N/A |
| 2017 | Darkest Hour | N/A |
| 2017 | Logan | N/A |
| 2017 | War for the Planet of the Apes | N/A |
| 2018 | A Quiet Place | Erik Aadahl, Michael Barosky, Brandon Proctor, and Ethan Van der Ryn |
| 2018 | Black Panther | Peter J. Devlin, Steve Boeddeker, Brandon Proctor, Christopher Foge, Doc Kane, and Scott Curtis |
| 2018 | First Man | N/A |
| 2018 | Mary Poppins Returns | N/A |
| 2018 | Roma | N/A |
| 2018 | A Star Is Born | N/A |
| 2019 | Ford v Ferrari | David Giammarco, Paul Massey, Steven A. Morrow, and Donald Sylvester |
| 2019 | 1917 | Scott Millan, Oliver Tarney, Mark Taylor, and Stuart Wilson |
| 2019 | Avengers: Endgame | Tom Johnson, Daniel Laurie, Shannon Mills, Juan Peralta, and John Pritchett |
| 2019 | Joker | Alan Robert Murray, Tom Ozanich, and Dean A. Zupancic |
| 2019 | Once Upon a Time in Hollywood | Christian P. Minkler, Michael Minkler, Wylie Stateman, and Mark Ulano |
| 2019 | Rocketman | Matthew Collinge and John Hayes |

=== 2020s ===
| Year | Film | Recipient(s) |
|---|---|---|
| 2020 | Sound of Metal | Jaime Baksht, Nicolas Becker, Phillip Bladh, Carlos Cortés, Michelle Couttolenc, and Carolina Santana |
| 2020 | Mank | Ren Klyce, Drew Kunin, Jeremy Molod, Nathan Nance, and David Parker |
| 2020 | The Midnight Sky | Todd Beckett, Danny Hambrook, Dan Hiland, Bjørn Ole Schroeder, and Randy Thom |
| 2020 | Nomadland | Sergio Díaz, Zach Seivers, and M. Wolf Snyder |
| 2020 | The Prom | David Giammarco, Gary Megregian, Steven A. Morrow, and Mark Paterson |
| 2020 | Tenet | Willie D. Burton, Richard King, Kevin O'Connell, and Gary A. Rizzo |
| 2021 | tick, tick... BOOM! | Paul Hsu and Tod A. Maitland |
| 2021 | Belfast | Niv Adiri, Simon Chase, James Mather, and Denise Yarde |
| 2021 | Dune | Ron Bartlett, Theo Green, Doug Hemphill, Mark Mangini, and Mac Ruth |
| 2021 | The Harder They Fall | Ron Bartlett, Clint Bennett, Doug Hemphill, Richard King, and Anthony Ortiz |
| 2021 | The Last Duel | Daniel Birch, Stéphane Bucher, David Giammarco, Paul Massey, William Miller, and Oliver Tarney |
| 2021 | The Power of the Dog | Richard Flynn, Leah Katz, Robert Mackenzie, Tara Webb, and Dave Whitehead |
| 2022 | Top Gun: Maverick | James Mather, Al Nelson, Bjorn Schroeder, Mark Taylor, and Mark Weingarten |
| 2022 | Avatar: The Way of Water | Dick Bernstein, Christopher Boyes, Michael Hedges, Julian Howarth, Gary Summers, and Gwendolyn Yates Whittle |
| 2022 | Babylon | Ai-Ling Lee, Mildred Iatrou Morgan, Steven A. Morrow, and Andy Nelson |
| 2022 | Elvis | Michael Keller, David Lee, Andy Nelson, and Wayne Pashley |
| 2022 | RRR | Boloy Kumar Doloi, Rahul Karpe, and Raghunath Kemisetty |
| 2022 | The Woman King | Tony Lamberti, Derek Mansvelt, Kevin O'Connell, and Becky Sullivan |
| 2023 | Maestro | Richard King, Steven A. Morrow, Tom Ozanich, Jason Ruder, and Dean A. Zupancic |
| 2023 | American Symphony | Tristan Baylis, Ryan Collison, Tom Paul, Matt Snedecor, and William Tzouris |
| 2023 | Ferrari | Tony Lamberti, Andy Nelson, Lee Orloff, and Bernard Weiser |
| 2023 | Killers of the Flower Moon | Tod A. Maitland, John Pritchett, Philip Stockton, and Mark Ulano |
| 2023 | Napoleon | James Harrison, Paul Massey, William Miller, Oliver Tarney, and Rachael Tate |
| 2023 | Oppenheimer | Willie D. Burton, Richard King, Kevin O'Connell, and Gary A. Rizzo |
