= Cinema Audio Society Awards 2022 =

US film and television awards ceremony

59th Cinema Audio Society Awards

March 4, 2023

Motion Pictures – Live Action:
Top Gun: Maverick

The 59th Cinema Audio Society Awards were held on March 4, 2023, at the InterContinental in Los Angeles, to honor outstanding achievements in sound mixing in film and television of 2022. The nominations were announced on January 10, 2023.

CAS President Karol Urban described the event as a "smashing success", summarizing, "There is magic in this organization created by sound mixers for sound mixers. Mentorship, community, and kindness are critical keystones to our success. Tonight, our membership stands at just over 1,000, providing a greater diversity of experience and covering the globe in a larger international footprint than ever before. Together, we thrive through volunteerism, honoring our legends and ensuring a legacy for the future of our craft."

During the evening's festivities, CAS members and celebrity presenters also announced the Student Recognition Award; Timo Nelson from the University of Texas at Austin won the award, receiving a check for $5,000. The other four student finalists each took home $1,000 from the CAS, along with $10,000 in products and gear to help launch their careers in sound, thanks to the support of the following generous companies (Absentia DX / Todd-AO, Acon Digital, Avid, Deity Microphones, DTS, Halter Technical, iZotope, JBL Professional by Harman, K-Tek, Krotos Audio, Lectrosonics, Inc., McDSP, ShotDeck, Sounddogs, and Sound Particles).

The ceremony was hosted by comedian Ben Gleib.

== Winners and nominees ==
Winners are listed first and in bold.

=== Film ===
| Outstanding Achievement in Sound Mixing for Motion Pictures – Live Action | Outstanding Achievement in Sound Mixing for Motion Pictures – Animated |
|---|---|
| **Top Gun: Maverick – Mark Weingarten (production mixer); Chris Burdon, Mark Taylor (re-recording mixers); Al Clay, Stephen Lipson (scoring mixers); Blake Collins (foley mixer)**; All Quiet on the Western Front – Viktor Prášil (production mixer); Lars Ginzel, Stefan Korte (re-recording mixers); Daniel Kresco (scoring mixer); Jan Meyerdierks (ADR mixer); Hanse Warns (foley mixer); Avatar: The Way of Water – Julian Howarth (production mixer); Christopher Boyes, Gary Summers, Michael Hedges (re-recording mixer); Simon Rhodes (scoring mixer); Bill Higley (ADR mixer); Tavish Grade (foley mixer); The Batman – Stuart Wilson (production mixer); Andy Nelson, William Files (re-recording mixers); Kirsty Whalley (scoring mixer); Ryan D. Young (ADR mixer); Darrin Mann (foley mixer); Elvis – David Lee (production mixer); Andy Nelson, Michael Keller, Wayne Pashley (re-recording mixers); Geoff Foster (scoring mixer); Tami Treadwell (ADR mixer); Amy Barber (foley mixer) | **Guillermo del Toro's Pinocchio – Jon Taylor, Frank Montaño (re-recording mixer); Peter Cobbin (scoring mixer); Tavish Grade (foley mixer)**; Lightyear – Paul McGrath (original dialogue mixer); Stephen Urata, Ren Klyce (re-recording mixers); Warren Brown (scoring mixer); Scott Curtis (foley mixer); Minions: The Rise of Gru – Tim Nielsen, Steve Slanec (re-recording mixers); Alan Meyerson (scoring mixer); Jason Butler (foley mixer); Puss in Boots: The Last Wish – Ken Gombos (original doalogue mixer); Julian Slater, Greg P. Russell (re-recording mixer); Alan Meyerson (scoring mixer); Ryan Squires (foley mixer); Turning Red – Vince Caro (original dialogue mixer); Stephen Urata, Ren Klyce (re-recording mixer); Chris Fogel (scoring mixer); Scott Curtis (foley mixer) |
Outstanding Achievement in Sound Mixing for Motion Pictures – Documentary
**Moonage Daydream – Paul Massey, David Giammarco (re-recording mixers); Jens Rosenlund Petersen (ADR mixer)**; Good Night Oppy – Mark Mangini (re-recording mixer); Greg Hayes (scoring mixer); Hallelujah: Leonard Cohen, A Journey, A Song – Bob Edwards, Scott R. Lewis (re-recording mixers); Louis Armstrong's Black & Blues – Leslie Shatz (re-recording mixer); Louis Schultz (scoring mixer); The Volcano: Rescue from Whakaari – Joe Milner (re-recording mixer); Jacob Johnston (scoring mixer); Kevin Carvalho (foley mixer)

=== Television ===
| Outstanding Achievement in Sound Mixing for Television Series – One Hour | Outstanding Achievement in Sound Mixing for Television Series – Half Hour |
|---|---|
| **Better Call Saul: "Saul Gone" – Phillip W. Palmer (production mixer); Larry Benjamin, Kevin Valentine (re-recording mixers); Chris Navarro (ADR mixer); Stacey Michaels (foley mixer) (AMC)**; Ozark: "A Hard Way to Go" – Akira Fukasawa (production mixer); Larry Benjamin, Kevin Valentine (re-recording mixers); Phil McGowan (scoring mixer); Amy Barber (foley mixer) (Netflix); Severance: "The We We Are" – Bryan Dembinski (production mixer); Bob Chefalas (re-recording mixer); Chris Fogel (scoring mixer); George A. Lara (foley mixer) (Apple TV+); Stranger Things: "Chapter Seven: The Massacre at Hawkins Lab" – Michael P. Clark (production mixer); Mark Paterson, William Files, Craig Henighan (re-recording mixers); Hector Carlos Ramirez (scoring mixer); Jeffrey Roy (ADR mixer); Peter Persaud (foley mixer) (Netflix); The White Lotus: "Ciao" – Angelo Bonanni (production mixer); Christian P. Minkler, Ryan Collins (re-recording mixers); Debra R. Winsberg (ADR mixer); Michael Head (foley mixer) (HBO) | **Only Murders in the Building: "The Tell" – Joseph White Jr. (production mixer); Penny Harold, Andrew Garrett Lange (re-recording mixers); Alan Demoss (scoring mixer); Chris Navarro (ADR mixer); Erika Koski (foley mixer) (Hulu)**; Barry: "starting now" – Scott Harber (production mixer); Elmo Ponsdomenech, Teddy Salas, Sean Heissinger (re-recording mixers); David Wingo (scoring mixer); Howard London (ADR mixer); Darrin Mann (foley mixer) (HBO); The Bear: "Review" – Scott D. Smith (production mixer); Steve Giammaria (re-recording mixer); Patrick Christensen (ADR mixer); Ryan Collison, Connor Nagy (foley mixers) (Hulu); She-Hulk: Attorney at Law: "Whose Show Is This?" – Marcus Petruska (production mixer); Pete Horner, Karol Urban (re-recording mixers); Alvin Wee (scoring mixer); Doc Kane (ADR mixer); Jason Butler (foley mixer) (Disney+); What We Do in the Shadows: "Pine Barrens" – Rob Beal (production mixer); Sam Ejnes, Diego Gat, Marc Fishman (re-recording mixer); Stacey Michaels (foley mixer) (FX) |
| Outstanding Achievement in Sound Mixing for Non-Theatrical Motion Pictures or Limited Series | Outstanding Achievement in Sound Mixing for Television – Non-Fiction, Variety, or Music/Series or Specials |
| **Obi-Wan Kenobi: "Part I" – Julian Howarth (production mixer); Bonnie Wild, Danielle Dupre, Scott R. Lewis (re-recording mixers); (scoring mixer); Doc Kane (ADR mixer); Jason Butler (foley mixer) (Disney+)**; Dahmer – Monster: The Jeffrey Dahmer Story: "Lionel" – Amanda Beggs (production mixer); Laura Wiest, Joe Barnett, Jamie Hardt (re-recording mixers); Judah Getz (ADR mixer); Jacob McNaughton (foley mixer) (Netflix); Guillermo del Toro's Cabinet of Curiosities: "The Autopsy" – Rob Beal (production mixer); Paul Shubat, Michael Woroniuk (re-recording mixers) (Netflix); Moon Knight: "Gods and Monsters" – Tamás Csaba (production mixer); Bonnie Wild, Scott R. Lewis (re-recording mixers); Scott Michael Smith (scoring mixer); Doc Kane (ADR mixer); Jack Cucci (foley mixer) (Disney+); Prey – Ron Osiowy (production mixer); Craig Henighan, Chris Terhune, Joel Dougherty (re-recording mixers); Frank Wolf (scoring mixer); Jamison Rabbe (ADR mixer); Connor Nagy (foley mixer) (Hulu) | **Formula 1: Drive to Survive: "Gloves Are Off" – Nick Fry, Steve Speed (re-recording mixers) (Netflix)**; Carole King & James Taylor: Just Call Out My Name – Danny Kortchmar (production mixer); Gary A. Rizzo (re-recording mixer) (HBO Max); George Carlin's American Dream: "Part 1" – Paul Graff (production mixer); Earl Martin, Jason Gaya (re-recording mixers) (HBO); Lucy and Desi – Sabi Tulok (production mixer); Patrick Spain, John W. Rampey (re-recording mixer); Scott Sheppard (scoring mixer) (Prime Video); Obi-Wan Kenobi: A Jedi's Return – Richard Hays (production mixer); Danielle Dupre (re-recording mixer); Scott Michael Smith (scoring mixer) (Disney+) |

=== Special awards ===
Filmmaker Award

- **Alejandro González Iñárritu**

Career Achievement Award

- **Peter J. Devlin**

Student Recognition Award

- **Timo Nelson**
