= Cinema Audio Society Awards 2024 =

Awards presented for sound mixing in 2024

61st Cinema Audio Society Awards

February 22, 2025

Motion Pictures – Live Action:
A Complete Unknown

Motion Pictures – Documentary:
Music by John Williams

The 61st Cinema Audio Society Awards were held on February 22, 2025, at the Beverly Hilton in Los Angeles, California, to honor outstanding achievements in sound mixing in film and television of 2024. The nominations were announced on January 7, 2025.

American sound mixer Tod A. Maitland received the Career Achievement Award while Canadian filmmaker Denis Villeneuve was honored with the Filmmaker Award.

== Winners and nominees ==
Winners are listed first and in bold.

=== Film ===
Outstanding Achievement in Sound Mixing for Motion Pictures – Live Action	Outstanding Achievement in Sound Mixing for Motion Pictures – Animated
**A Complete Unknown – Tod A. Maitland (production sound mixer), Paul Massey, David Giammarco (re-recording mixers), Nick Baxter (scoring mixer), David Betancourt (ADR mixer), Kevin Schultz (foley mixer)**; Deadpool & Wolverine – Colin Nicolson (production sound mixer), Lora Hirschberg, Craig Henighan (re-recording mixers), Peter Cobbin (scoring mixer), Bobby Johanson (ADR mixer), Peter Persaud (foley mixer); Dune: Part Two – Gareth John (production sound mixer), Ron Bartlett, Doug Hemphill (re-recording mixers), Alan Meyerson (scoring mixer), Jason Oliver (ADR mixer), Tavish Grade, Mikel Parraga-Wills (foley mixers); Gladiator II – Stephane Bucher (production sound mixer), Paul Massey, Matthew Collinge (re-recording mixers), Alan Meyerson (scoring mixer), Filipe Pereira (ADR mixer), Rob Weatherall (foley mixer); Wicked – Simon Hayes (production sound mixer), Andy Nelson, John Marquis (re-recording mixers), John Michael Caldwell (scoring mixer), Jason Oliver (ADR mixer), Mikel Parraga-Wills (foley mixer)	**The Wild Robot – Ken Gombos (original dialogue mixer), Leff Lefferts, Gary A. Rizzo (re-recording mixers), Alan Meyerson (scoring mixer), Richard Duarte (foley mixer)**; Inside Out 2 – Vince Caro (original dialogue mixer), Ren Klyce, Stephen Urata (re-recording mixers), Warren Brown (scoring mixer), Doc Kane (ADR mixer), Leff Lefferts (foley mixer); Moana 2 – Gabriel Guy (original dialogue mixer & re-recording mixer), David Fluhr (re-recording mixer), David Boucher (scoring mixer), Doc Kane (ADR mixer), Richard Duarte (foley mixer); Mufasa: The Lion King – Doc Kane (original dialogue mixer), Onnalee Blank, Greg P. Russell (re-recording mixers), Chris Fogel, David Boucher (scoring mixers), Gary Turnbull (ADR mixer), Mikel Parraga-Wills (foley mixer); Wallace & Gromit: Vengeance Most Fowl – Will Norie (original dialogue mixer), Chris Burdon, Gilbert Lake (re-recording mixers), Simon Rhodes (scoring mixer), Nick Roberts (ADR mixer), Adrian Rhodes (foley mixer)
Outstanding Achievement in Sound Mixing for Motion Pictures – Documentary
**Music by John Williams – Noah Alexander (production mixer), Christopher Barnett, Roy Waldspurger (re-recording mixers)**; The Blue Angels – Sean Peterson (production sound mixer), Lindsey Alvarez (re-recording mixer), Forest Christenson (scoring mixer); Elton John: Never Too Late – Jae Kim (production sound mixer), Elmo Ponsdomenech, Teddy Salas (re-recording mixers); I Am: Celine Dion – Irene Taylor (production mixer), Lora Hirschberg (re-recording mixer), Tim Oliver (scoring mixer); Super/Man: The Christopher Reeve Story – Austin Plocher (production sound mixer), Greg Gettens (re-recording mixer), Steve McLaughlin (scoring mixer), Daniel Nicholls (foley mixer)

=== Television ===
Outstanding Achievement in Sound Mixing for Television Series – One Hour	Outstanding Achievement in Sound Mixing for Television Series – Half Hour
**Shōgun: "Broken to the Fist" – Michael Williamson (production sound mixer), Steve Pederson, Greg P. Russell (re-recording mixers), Takashi Akaku (ADR mixer), Arno Stephanian (foley mixer) (FX)**; Fallout: "The End" – Tod A. Maitland (production sound mixer), Steve Bucino, Keith Rogers (re-recording mixers), Mike Marino (foley mixer) (Prime Video); Slow Horses: "Hello Goodbye" – Andrew Sissons (production sound mixer), Martin Jensen (re-recording mixer) (Apple TV+); True Detective: Night Country: "Part 6" – Skuli Helgi Sigurgislason (production sound mixer), Howard Bargroff, Mark Timms (re-recording mixers), Goetz Botzenhardt (scoring mixer), Nick Kray (ADR mixer), Keith Partridge (foley mixer) (HBO); Yellowstone: "Life is a Promise" – Andrejs Prokopenko (production sound mixer), Brad Zoern, Josh Sieh, David S. DiPietro (re-recording mixers) (Paramount Network)	**The Bear: "Doors" – Scott D. Smith (production sound mixer), Steve "Major" Giammaria (re-recording mixer), Patrick Christensen, Kendall Barron (ADR mixers), Ryan Collison, Connor Nagy (foley mixers) (FX)**; Curb Your Enthusiasm: "Ken/Kendra" – Chuck Buch (production sound mixer), Earl Martin (re-recording mixer) (HBO); Hacks: "Bulletproof" – Jim Lakin (production sound mixer), John W. Cook II, Ben Wilkins (re-recording mixers), Fernanda Domene (ADR mixer), Jacob McNaughton (foley mixer) (Max); Only Murders in the Building: "Blow Up" – Joseph White Jr. (production sound mixer), Kyle O'Neal, Mathew Waters (re-recording mixers), Alan Demoss (scoring mixer), Rodrigo Galvan (ADR mixer), Erika Koski (foley mixer) (Hulu); What We Do in the Shadows: "Nandor's Army" – Rob Beal (production sound mixer), Diego Gat, Christina Wen (re-recording mixers), Caitlin McDaid, Judah Getz (ADR mixer), Alex Jongbloed (foley mixer) (FX)
Outstanding Achievement in Sound Mixing for Non-Theatrical Motion Pictures or Limited Series	Outstanding Achievement in Sound Mixing for Television – Non-Fiction, Variety, or Music/Series or Specials
**Masters of the Air: "Part Five" – Tim Fraser (production sound mixer), Michael Minkler, Duncan McRae, Shane Stoneback (re-recording mixers), Thor Fienberg (scoring mixer), Sean Moher (ADR mixer), Randy K. Singer (foley mixer) (Apple TV+)**; Baby Reindeer: "Episode 7" – Jake Whitelee (production sound mixer), James Ridgway (re-recording mixer), Keith Partridge (foley mixer) (Netflix); The Penguin: "After Hours" – Christof Gebert (production sound mixer), Andy Kris, Rich Bologna (re-recording mixers), Mark DeSimone (ADR mixer) (HBO); Ripley: "III Sommerso" – Maurizio Argentieri (production sound mixer), Michael Barry, Larry Zipf (re-recording mixers), Michael Perfitt (scoring mixer), Scott Cannizzaro (ADR mixer), Matthew Kay (foley mixer) (Netflix); Stax: Soulsville U.S.A.: "Soul Man" – Andre Artis (production sound mixer), Tony Volante (re-recording mixer) (HBO)	**Beatles '64 – Josh Berger, Giles Martin (re-recording mixers) (Apple TV+)**; The 100th: Billy Joel at Madison Square Garden – Brian Ruggles (production sound mixer), Brian Riordan, Phil DeTolve (re-recording mixers) (Apple TV+); Formula 1: Drive to Survive: "Forza Ferrari" – Doug Dreger (production sound mixer), Steve Speed, Nick Fry (re-recording mixers) (Netflix); Jim Henson Idea Man – Liviu Lupsa (production sound mixer), Tony Volante, Dan Timmons (re-recording mixers), Casey Stone (scoring mixer), JJ Suelto (ADR mixer), Ryan Collison (foley mixer) (Disney+); Yacht Rock: A Dockumentary – Barry London (production sound mixer), Tony Solis, Maverick Yadao (re-recording mixers) (HBO)

=== Special awards ===
Filmmaker Award

- **Denis Villeneuve**

Career Achievement Award

- **Tod A. Maitland**

Student Recognition Award

- **Guillermo Moya (Full Sail University)**
