= Cinema Audio Society Awards 2023 =

US film and television awards ceremony

60th Cinema Audio Society Awards

March 2, 2024

Motion Pictures – Live Action:
Oppenheimer

The 60th Cinema Audio Society Awards were held on March 2, 2024, at the Beverly Hilton in Los Angeles, California, to honor outstanding achievements in sound mixing in film and television of 2023. The nominations were announced on January 9, 2024.

The ceremony was hosted by comedian Tom Papa.

== Winners and nominees ==
Winners are listed first and in bold.

=== Film ===
Outstanding Achievement in Sound Mixing for Motion Pictures – Live Action	Outstanding Achievement in Sound Mixing for Motion Pictures – Animated
**Oppenheimer – Willie D. Burton (production mixer); Gary A. Rizzo, Kevin O'Connell (re-recording mixers); Chris Fogel (scoring mixers); Tavish Grade, Jack Cucci, Mikel Parraga-Wills (foley mixers)**; Barbie – Nina Rice (production mixer); Kevin O'Connell, Ai-Ling Lee (re-recording mixers); Peter Cobbin, Kirsty Whalley (scoring mixers); Bobby Johanson (ADR mixer); Kevin Schultz (foley mixer); Ferrari – Lee Orloff (production mixer); Andy Nelson, Tony Lamberti, Luke Schwarzweller (re-recording mixers); Andrew Dudman (scoring mixer); Matthew Wood (ADR mixer); Giorgi Lekishvili (foley mixer); Killers of the Flower Moon – Mark Ulano (production mixer); Tom Fleischman, Eugene Gearty (re-recording mixers); George A. Lara (foley mixer); Maestro – Steven A. Morrow (production mixer); Tom Ozanich, Dean A. Zupancic (re-recording mixers); Nick Baxter (scoring mixers); Bobby Johanson (ADR mixer); Walter Spencer (foley mixer)	**Spider-Man: Across the Spider-Verse – Brian Smith, Aaron Hasson, Howard London (original dialogue mixers); Michael Semanick, Juan Peralta (re-recording mixers); Sam Okell (scoring mixer); Randy K. Singer (foley mixer)**; The Boy and the Heron – Kôji Kasamatsu (original dialogue mixer and re-recording mixer); Elemental – Vince Caro, Paul McGrath (original dialogue mixers); Stephen Urata, Ren Klyce (re-recording mixers); Thomas Vicari (scoring mixer); Scott Curtis (foley mixer); The Super Mario Bros. Movie – Carlos Sotolongo (original dialogue mixer); Pete Horner, Juan Peralta (re-recording mixers); Casey Stone (scoring mixer); Doc Kane (ADR mixer); Richard Durante (foley mixer); Teenage Mutant Ninja Turtles: Mutant Mayhem – Doc Kane (original dialogue mixer); Michael Semanick, Mark Mangini (re-recording mixers); Trent Reznor, Atticus Ross (scoring mixers); Chris Cirino (ADR mixer); Chelsea Body (foley mixer)
Outstanding Achievement in Sound Mixing for Motion Pictures – Documentary
**32 Sounds – Laura Cunningham (production mixer); Mark Mangini (re-recording mixer); Ben Greenberg (scoring mixer); Bobby Johanson (ADR mixer); Blake Collins (foley mixer)**; American Symphony – Tom Paul, Tristan Baylis (re-recording mixers); Ryan Collison (foley mixer); Little Richard: I Am Everything – Tom Paul (re-recording mixer); Still: A Michael J. Fox Movie – Skip Lievsay, Paul Urmson, Joel Dougherty (re-recording mixers); John Michael Caldwell (scoring mixer); Micah Blaichman (foley mixer); Taylor Swift: The Eras Tour – Jacob Farron Smith (production mixer); John Ross, David Payne, Christopher Rowe (re-recording mixers)

=== Television ===
Outstanding Achievement in Sound Mixing for Television Series – One Hour	Outstanding Achievement in Sound Mixing for Television Series – Half Hour
**The Last of Us: "When You're Lost in the Darkness" – Michael Playfair (production mixer); Marc Fishman, Kevin Roache (re-recording mixers); Randy Wilson (foley mixer) (HBO)**; The Crown: "Gunpowder" – Chris Ashworth (production mixer); Stuart Hilliker, Lee Walpole, Martin Jensen (re-recording mixers); Ben Tisdall (ADR mixer); Anna Wright (foley mixer) (Netflix); The Marvelous Mrs. Maisel: "The Testi-Roastial" – Mathew Price (production mixer); Ron Bochar (re-recording mixers); Stewart Lerman (scoring mixer); George A. Lara (foley mixer) (Prime Video); Succession: "Connor's Wedding" – Ken Ishii (production mixer); Andy Kris, Nicholas Renbeck (re-recording mixers); Thomas Vicari (scoring mixer); Mark DeSimone (ADR mixer); Micah Blaichman (foley mixer) (HBO); Ted Lasso: "So Long, Farewell" – David Lascelles (production mixer); Ryan Kennedy, Sean Byrne (re-recording mixers); Jordan McClain (foley mixer) (Apple TV+)	**The Bear: "Forks" – Scott D. Smith (production mixer); Steve "Major" Giammaria (re-recording mixers); Patrick Christensen (ADR mixer); Ryan Collison (foley mixer) (FX / Hulu)**; Barry: "wow" – Scott Harber (production mixer); Elmo Ponsdomenech, Teddy Salas (re-recording mixers); David Wingo (scoring mixer); Aaron Hasson (ADR mixer); Darrin Mann (foley mixer) (HBO); Only Murders in the Building: "Sitzprobe" – Joseph White Jr. (production mixer); Mathew Waters, Lindsey Alvarez (re-recording mixers); Derik Lee (song mixer); Alan DeMoss (scoring mixer); Derek Pacuk (ProTools playback mixer); Erika Koski (foley mixer) (Hulu); The Mandalorian: "Chapter 24: The Return" – Shawn Holden (production mixer); Scott R. Lewis, Tony Villaflor (re-recording mixers); Chris Fogel (scoring mixer); Aaron Hasson (ADR mixer); Scott Curtis (foley mixer) (Disney+); What We Do in the Shadows: "Local News" – Rob Beal (production mixer); Samuel Ejnes, Diego Gat (re-recording mixers); Stacey Michaels (foley mixer) (FX)
Outstanding Achievement in Sound Mixing for Non-Theatrical Motion Pictures or Limited Series	Outstanding Achievement in Sound Mixing for Television – Non-Fiction, Variety, or Music/Series or Specials
**Weird: The Al Yankovic Story – Richard Bullock (production mixer); Tony Solis (re-recording mixer); Phil McGowan (scoring mixer); Brian Magrum (ADR mixer); Erika Koski (foley mixer) (The Roku Channel)**; All the Light We Cannot See: "Episode 4" – Balazs Varga (production mixer); Mark Paterson, Craig Henighan (re-recording mixers); Nick Wollage (scoring mixer); Bobby Johanson (ADR mixer); Peter Persaud (foley mixer) (Netflix); Beef: "The Great Fabricator" – Sean O'Malley (production mixer); Penny Harold, Andrew Garrett Lange (re-recording mixers); Andrey Starikovskiy (foley mixer) (Netflix); Black Mirror: "Beyond the Sea" – Richard Miller (production mixer); James Ridgway (re-recording mixer); Daniel Kresco (scoring mixer); James Hyde (ADR mixer); Adam Mendez (foley mixer) (Netflix); Daisy Jones & the Six: "Track 10: Rock 'n' Roll Suicide" – Chris Welcker (production mixer); Lindsey Alvarez, Mathew Waters (re-recording mixers); Mike Poole (scoring mixer); Chris Navarro (ADR mixer); James B. Howe (foley mixer) (Prime Video)	**100 Foot Wave: "Lost at Sea" – Keith Hodne (production mixer) (HBO)**; Bono & The Edge: A Sort of Homecoming with Dave Letterman – Karl Merren (production mixer); Brian Riordan, Phil DeTolve (re-recording mixers); Jacknife Lee (scoring mixer) (Disney+); Formula 1: Drive to Survive: "Over the Limit" – Doug Dredger (production mixer); Steve Speed, Nick Fry (re-recording mixers) (Netflix); The Late Show with Stephen Colbert: "John Oliver; Broadway Cast of The Lion King" – Pierre de Laforcade (production mixer); Tom Herrmann (FOH mixer); Al Bonomo (monitor mixer); Harvey Goldberg (music mixer) (CBS); Welcome to Wrexham: "Ballers" – Mark Jensen (re-recording mixer) (FX)

=== Special awards ===
Filmmaker Award

- **J. J. Abrams**

Career Achievement Award

- **Joe Earle**

Student Recognition Award

- **Yushu "Doris" Shen (University of Southern California)**
