= Cinema Audio Society Awards 2018 =

US awards for sound in film and television

The 55th Cinema Audio Society Awards was held on February 16, 2019, virtually, honoring outstanding achievement in sound mixing in film and television of 2018.

== Winners and nominees ==
Outstanding Achievement in Sound Mixing for a Motion Picture – Live Action	Outstanding Achievement in Sound Mixing for a Motion Picture – Animated
Bohemian Rhapsody – John Casali, production mixer; Paul Massey, Tim Cavagin & Niv Adiri, re-recording mixers; Alan Meyerson, scoring mixer; Thomas J. O'Connell, ADR mixer; Glen Gathard & Jemma Riley Tolch, Foley mixers; Black Panther – Peter J. Devlin, production mixer; Steve Boeddeker & Brandon Proctor, re-recording mixers; Christopher Fogel, scoring mixer; Doc Kane, ADR mixer; Scott Curtis, Foley mixer; First Man – Mary H. Ellis, production mixer; Jon Taylor, Frank A. Montaño, Ai-Ling Lee, re-recording mixers; Nick Baxter, scoring mixer; Thomas J. O’Connell, ADR mixer; Richard Duarte, Foley mixer; A Quiet Place – Michael Barosky, production mixer; Brandon Proctor, Michael Barry, re-recording mixers; Tyson Lozensky, scoring mixer; Bob Lacivita, ADR mixer; Peter Persuad, Foley mixer; A Star Is Born – Steven A. Morrow, production mixer; Tom Ozanich, Dean Zupancic, Jason Ruder, re-recording mixers; Nick Baxter, scoring mixer; Thomas J. O’Connell, ADR mixer; Richard Duarte, Foley mixer	Isle of Dogs – Darrin Moore, original dialogue mixer; Christopher Scarabosio, Wayne Lemmer, re-recording mixers; Xavier Forcioli, Simon Rhodes, scoring mixers; Peter Persaud, Foley mixer; The Grinch – Bill Higley & Michael Miller, original dialogue mixers; Gary A. Rizzo & Juan Peralta, re-recording mixers; Noah Scot Snyder, scoring mixer; Blake Collins, Foley mixer; Incredibles 2 – Vince Caro & Doc Kane, original dialogue mixers; Michael Semanick & Nathan Nance, re-recording mixers; Joel Iwataki, scoring mixer; Scott Curtis, Foley mixer; Ralph Breaks the Internet – Doc Kane & Paul McGrath, original dialogue mixers; David E. Fluhr & Gabriel Guy, re-recording mixers; Alan Meyerson, scoring mixer; Scott Curtis, Foley mixer; Spider-Man: Into the Spider-Verse – Brian Smith, Aaron Hasson & Howard London, original dialogue mixers; Michael Semanick & Tony Lamberti, re-recording mixers; Sam Okell, scoring mixer; Randy Singer, Foley mixer
Outstanding Achievement in Sound Mixing for a Motion Picture – Documentary	Outstanding Achievement in Sound Mixing for a Television Movie or Mini-Series
Free Solo – Jim Hurst production mixer; Tom Fleischman & Ric Schnupp, re-recording mixers; Tyson Lozensky, scoring mixer; David Boulton, ADR mixer; Joana Niza Braga, Foley mixer; Fahrenheit 11/9 – Mark Roy, production mixer; Andy Kris, Lee Salevan & Skip Lievsay, re-recording mixers; Quincy – Al Hicks, production mixer; Jonathan Wales, re-recording mixer; They'll Love Me When I'm Dead – Rob Fillmore, production mixer; Brian Riordan, re-recording mixer; Won't You Be My Neighbor? – Pete Horner & Jeff King, re-recording mixers	The Assassination of Gianni Versace: American Crime Story – John Bauman, production mixer; Joe Earle & Doug Andham, re-recording mixers; Judah Getz, ADR mixer; Arno Stephanian, Foley mixer (Episode: "The Man Who Would Be Vogue") (FX); Escape at Dannemora – Tom Nelson, production mixer; Bob Chefalas & Jacob Ribicoff, re-recording mixers; John W. Chapman, scoring mixer; Krissopher Chevannes, ADR mixer; George A. Lara, Foley mixer (Episode: "Part 1") (Showtime); Fahrenheit 451 – Henry Embry, production mixer; Tom Fleischman & Jacob Ribicoff, re-recording mixers; Mark DeSimone, ADR mixer; George A. Lara, Foley mixer (HBO); Genius: Picasso – Tamás Csaba, production mixer; Bob Bronow & Mark Hensley, re-recording mixers; Beau Emory & Matt Hovland, ADR mixers; David Torres, Foley mixer, Episode: "Chapter One") (Nat Geo); The Romanoffs – Petr Forejt, production mixer; Larry Benjamin & Kevin Valentine, re-recording mixers; Chris Navarro, ADR mixer; Terry Boyd Jr., Foley mixer (Episode: "House of Special Purpose") (Amazon)
Outstanding Achievement in Sound Mixing for Television Series – One Hour	Outstanding Achievement in Sound Mixing for Television Series – Half Hour
The Marvelous Mrs. Maisel – Mathew Price, production mixer, Ron Bochar, re-recording mixer, Stewart Lerman, scoring mixer, David Boulton, ADR mixer, George Lara, Foley mixer (Episode: "Vote for Kennedy, Vote for Kennedy") (Amazon); Better Call Saul – Phillip W. Palmer, production mixer; Larry B. Benjamin & Kevin Valentine, re-recording mixers; Chris Navarro, ADR mixer; Stacey Michaels, Foley mixer (Episode: "Talk") (AMC); The Handmaid's Tale – Sylvain Arseneault, production mixer; Joe Morrow & Lou Solakofski, re-recording mixers; Scott Smith & Adam Taylor, scoring mixers; Mark DeSimone, ADR mixer; Jack Heeren, Foley mixer (Episode: "Holly") (Hulu); Ozark – Felipe Borrero, production mixer; Larry B. Benjamin & Kevin Valentine, re-recording mixers; Phil McGowan, scoring mixer; Matt Hovland, ADR mixer; David Torres, Foley mixer (Episode: "The Badger") (Netflix); Westworld – Geoffrey Patterson & Roger V. Stevenson, production mixers; Keith Rogers & Andy King, re-recording mixers; Michael Botha, ADR mixer; Geordy Sincavage, Foley mixer (Episode: "The Passenger") (HBO)	Mozart in the Jungle – Ryotaro Harada, production mixer; Andy D'Addario & Chris M. Jacobson, re-recording mixers; Patrick Christensen, ADR mixer; Gary DeLeone, Foley mixer (Episode: "Domo Arigato") (Amazon); Ballers – Scott Harber, production mixer; Richard Weingart & Michael Colomby, re-recording mixers; Michael Miller, ADR mixer; James B. Howe, Foley mixer (Episode: "The Kids Are Aight") (HBO); Barry – Benjamin Patrick, production mixer; Elmo Ponsdomenech & Todd Beckett, re-recording mixers; David Wingo, scoring mixer; Aaron Hasson, ADR mixer; John Sanacore, Foley mixer (Episode: "Chapter Seven: Loud, Fast, and Keep Going") (HBO); Modern Family – Stephen Tibbo, production mixer; Dean Okrand & Brian Harman, re-recording mixers; Matt Hovland, ADR mixer; David Torres, Foley mixer (Episode: "Did the Chicken Cross the Road?") (ABC); Silicon Valley – Benjamin Patrick, production mixer; Elmo Ponsdomenech & Todd Beckett, re-recording mixers; Oren Hadar, scoring mixer; Aaron Hasson, ADR mixer; Aran Tanchum, Foley mixer (Episode: "Fifty-One Percent") (HBO)
Outstanding Achievement in Sound Mixing for Television Non Fiction, Variety or Music – Series or Specials
Anthony Bourdain: Parts Unknown – Benny Mouthon, re-recording mixer (Episode: "Bhutan"); Carpool Karaoke – William B. Kaplan, Scott Smolev & Tim Murphy, production mixers; Conner Moore, re-recording mixer; Chris Maddalone, foldback mixer; Otto Svoboda, scoring mixer (Episode: "Primetime Special 2018"); Deadliest Catch – Bob Bronow re-recording mixer (Episode: "Blood and Water"); Jesus Christ Superstar Live in Concert – Tom Holmes, production mixer; Brian Flanzbaum & Christian Schrader, re-recording mixers; Ellen Fitton, ensemble mixer; John Harris, scoring mixer; Anthony Lalumia, ADR mixer; The Late Show with Stephen Colbert – Pierre DeLaforcade, production mixer; Tom Herrmann, foley mixer; Al Bonomo, monitor mixer; Harvey Goldberg, scoring mixer
