= Cinema Audio Society Awards 2019 =

Audio awards for sound and television

The 56th Cinema Audio Society Awards was held on January 25, 2020, virtually, honoring outstanding achievement in sound mixing in film and television of 2019.

== Winners and nominees ==
Outstanding Achievement in Sound Mixing for a Motion Picture – Live Action	Outstanding Achievement in Sound Mixing for a Motion Picture – Animated
Ford v Ferrari – Steven A. Morrow production mixer, David Giammarco & Paul Massey, re-recording mixers; Tyson Lozensky, scoring mixer; David Betancourt, ADR mixer; Richard Duarte, foley mixer; The Irishman – Tod A. Maitland, production mixer; Tom Fleischman & Eugene Gearty, re-recording mixers; Mark DeSimone, ADR mixer; George A. Lara, foley mixer; Joker – Tod Maitland production mixer; Tom Ozanich & Dean A. Zupancic re-recording mixers; Daniel Kresco, scoring mixer; Thomas J. O’Connell, ADR mixer; Richard Duarte, foley mixer; Once Upon a Time in Hollywood – Mark Ulano, production mixer; Christian Minkler & Michael Minkler, re-recording mixers; Kyle Rochlin foley mixer; Rocketman – John Hayes, production mixer; Mathew Collinge & Mike Prestwood Smith, re-recording mixers; Mark Appleby, ADR mixer; Glen Gathard, foley mixer	Toy Story 4 – Doc Kane, original dialogue mixer; Nathan Nance & Michael Semanick, re-recording mixers; David Bouche, scoring mixer; Vince Caro, adr mixer; Scott Curtis, foley mixer; Abominable – Tighe Sheldon, original dialogue mixer; Myron Nettinga, re-recording mixer; Nick Wollage, scoring mixer; David Jobe, foley mixer; Frozen 2 – Paul McGrath, original dialogue mixer; David E. Fluhr, Gabriel Guy & re-recording mixers; David Boucher, song mixer; Greg Hayes, scoring mixer; Doc Kane, ADR mixer; Scott Curtis, foley mixer; How to Train Your Dragon: The Hidden World – Tighe Sheldon, original dialogue mixer; Scott R. Lewis, Shawn Murphy, Gary A. Rizzo, re-recording mixer; Blake Collins, foley mixer; The Lion King – Ron Judkins, original dialogue mixer; Christopher Boyes & Lora Hirschberg, re-recording mixers; Alan Meyerson, scoring mixer; Blake Collins, foley mixer
Outstanding Achievement in Sound Mixing for a Motion Picture – Documentary	Outstanding Achievement in Sound Mixing for a Television Movie or Mini-Series
Making Waves: The Art of Cinematic Sound – David J. Turner, production mixer; Tom Myers, re-recording mixer; Dan Blanck, scoring mixer; Frank Rinella, ADR mixer; Apollo 11 – Eric Milano & Brian Eimer, re-recording mixers; Echo in the Canyon – John Rampey, production mixer; Chris Jenkins & Paul Karpinski, re-recording mixers; Dave Way, music mixer; Miles Davis: Birth of the Cool – Gautam Choudury, production mixer; Benny Mouthon, re-recording mixer; Woodstock: Three Days That Defined a Generation – Kevin Peters, re-recording mixer; Ryan Collison, foley mixer	Chernobyl – Vincent Piponnier, production mixer; Stuart Hilliker, re-recording mixer; Gibran Farrah, ADR mixer; Philip Clements, foley mixer (Episode: "1:23:45") (HBO); Apollo: Missions to the Moon – John Warrin, re-recording mixer; John W. Chapman, scoring mixer (Nat Geo); Deadwood: The Movie – Geoffrey Patterson, production mixer; John W. Cook II & William Freesh, re-recording mixers (HBO); El Camino: A Breaking Bad Movie – Phillip W. Palmer, production mixer; Larry Benjamin & Kevin Valentine, re-recording mixers; Greg Hayes, scoring mixer; Chris Navarro, ADR mixer; Stacey Michaels, foley mixer (Netflix); True Detective – Geoffrey Patterson, production mixer; Tateum Kohut & Greg Orloff, re-recording mixers; Biff Dawes, scoring mixer; Chris Navarro, ADR mixer; Nerses Gezalyan, foley mixer (Episode: "The Great War and Modern Memory") (HBO)
Outstanding Achievement in Sound Mixing for Television Series – One Hour	Outstanding Achievement in Sound Mixing for Television Series – Half Hour
Game of Thrones – Daniel Crowley, Ronan Hill & Simon Kerr, production mixers; Onnalee Blank & Matthew Waters, re-recording mixers; Brett Voss, foley mixer (Episode: "The Bells") (HBO); The Handmaid's Tale – Sylvain Arseneault, production mixer; Joe Morrow & Lou Solakofski, re-recording mixers; Scott Smith & Adam Taylor, scoring mixers; Andrea Rusch, ADR mixer; Kevin Schultz, foley mixer (Episode: "Heroic") (Hulu); Peaky Blinders – Stu Wright, production mixer; Nigel Heath & Brad Rees, re-recording mixers; Jimmy Robertson, scoring mixer; Oliver Brierley, ADR mixer; Ciaran Smith, foley mixer (Episode: "Mr. Jones" (Netflix); Stranger Things – Michael Rayle, production mixer; Will Files & Mark Paterson, re-recording mixers; Hector Carlos Ramirez, scoring mixer; Bill Higley, ADR mixer; Peter Persuad, foley mixer (Episode: "Chapter Eight: The Battle of Starcourt") (Netflix); Tom Clancy's Jack Ryan – Michael Barosky (production mixer; Daniel Leahy, Steve Pederson & re-recording mixers; Benjamin Darier, ADR mixer; Brett Voss, foley mixer (Episode: "Persona Non Grata") (Amazon)	Barry – Benjamin Patrick, production mixer; Elmo Ponsdomenech & Jason “Frenchie” Gaya, re-recording mixers; Aaron Hasson, ADR mixer; John Sanacore, foley mixer (Episode: "ronny/lily") (HBO); Fleabag – Christian Bourne, production mixer; David Drake, re-recording mixer; James Gregory, ADR mixer (Episode: Episode 6") (Amazon); Modern Family – Stephen Tibbo, production mixer; Dean Okrand & Brian Harman, re-recording mixers; Matt Hovland, ADR mixer; David Torres, foley mixer (Episode: "A Year of Birthdays") (ABC); Russian Doll – Phil Rosati, production mixer; Lewis Goldstein & Thomas Ryan, re-recording mixers; Jerrell Suelto, ADR mixer; Wen Hsuan-Tseng, foley mixer (Episode: "The Way Out") (HBO); Veep – William F. MacPherson, production mixer; John W. Cook II & William Freesh, re-recording mixers; Scott Sheppard, scoring mixer; Jesse Dodd, ADR mixer; Mike Marino, foley mixer (Episode: "Veep") (HBO)
Outstanding Achievement in Sound Mixing for Television Non Fiction, Variety or Music – Series or Specials
David Bowie: Finding Fame – Sean O’Neil, production mixer; Greg Gettens, re-recording mixer; Country Music: Will the Circle Be Unbroken? (1968-1972) – Jacob Feinberg & William Tzouris, production mixers; Martyn Zub, re-recording mixer; Deadliest Catch – Bob Bronow re-recording mixer (Episode: "Sixty Foot Monster"); Formula 1: Drive to Survive – Nick Fry, Steve Speed & James Evans, re-recording mixers (Episode: "The Next Generation"); Hitsville: The Making of Motown – Pete Orlanski, production mixer; Richard Kondal, re-recording mixer; Eduard Zemliano, foley mixer
