= Alan Meyerson =

American mixing engineer

- Occupations: Score mixer; mixing engineer; audio engineer; record producer
- Known for: Score mixing

Alan Meyerson is an American scoring mixer, recording engineer, and mixing engineer known for his work with Kris Bowers, James Newton Howard, John Powell, Harry Gregson-Williams, Hans Zimmer, Pharrell Williams, Daft Punk, and Deadmau5. He has worked on the films Dune: Part Two, Gladiator II, Dunkirk, among others, and the record Girl. Meyerson has won four Cinema Audio Society Awards, two for live action, and one for animated. Meyerson has won two Grammy Awards.

== Early life and education ==
Meyerson was born in New York City, where he attended Brooklyn College as a trumpet performance major in 1977. Meyerson started audio engineering during an internship at the college’s recording studio.

== Career ==
While working in Belgium, Meyerson recorded and mixed an album for Chet Baker. In New York he joined The Hit Factory and A&R Studios.

Meyerson transitioned to film scoring, collaborating with composers including Hans Zimmer, James Newton Howard, John Powell, Harry Gregson-Williams, and Danny Elfman. Meyerson has been credited on Interstellar, Dunkirk, the Pirates of the Caribbean series, and Dune: Part Two, among others.

In 2017, Meyerson mixed Mark Mothersbaugh's soundtrack for Thor: Ragnarok.

== Educator ==
Meyerson is an educator and mentor who lectures through masterclasses with Mix With The Masters, Berklee College of Music, and the Abbey Road Institute. His expertise includes score mixing, record production, mixing, and audio engineering.

== Awards ==
=== Grammy Awards ===
Year	Title	Category	Role	Result
2009	The Dark Night	Grammy Award for Best Score Soundtrack for Visual Media	Mixing Engineer	Won
2014	Steppin' Out	Grammy Award for Best Pop Instrumental Album	Mixing Engineer	Won
2015	G I R L	Grammy Award for Album of the Year	Mixing engineer	Nominated
2023	Star Wars Jedi: Survivor	Grammy Award for Best Score Soundtrack for Video Games and Other Interactive Media	Mixing engineer	Nominated

=== Cinema Audio Society Awards ===
Year	Title	Category	Role	Result
2012	Pirates of the Caribbean: On Stranger Tides	Cinema Audio Society Award for Outstanding Achievement in Sound Mixing for a Motion Picture – Live Action	Mixing engineer	Nominated
2013	Wreck-It Ralph	Cinema Audio Society Award for Outstanding Achievement in Sound Mixing for a Motion Picture – Animated	Mixing engineer	Nominated
2014	Despicable Me 2	Cinema Audio Society Award for Outstanding Achievement in Sound Mixing for a Motion Picture – Animated	Mixing engineer	Nominated
2015	Big Hero 6	Cinema Audio Society Award for Outstanding Achievement in Sound Mixing for a Motion Picture – Animated	Mixing engineer	Won
2015	Interstellar	Cinema Audio Society Award for Outstanding Achievement in Sound Mixing for a Motion Picture – Live Action	Mixing engineer	Nominated
2018	Dunkirk	Cinema Audio Society Award for Outstanding Achievement in Sound Mixing for a Motion Picture – Live Action	Mixing engineer	Nominated
2018	Wonder Woman	Cinema Audio Society Award for Outstanding Achievement in Sound Mixing for a Motion Picture – Live Action	Mixing engineer	Nominated
2019	Ralph Breaks the Internet	Cinema Audio Society Award for Outstanding Achievement in Sound Mixing for a Motion Picture – Animated	Mixing engineer	Nominated
2020	The Lion King	Cinema Audio Society Award for Outstanding Achievement in Sound Mixing for a Motion Picture – Animated	Mixing engineer	Nominated
2021	The Croods: A New Age	Cinema Audio Society Award for Outstanding Achievement in Sound Mixing for a Motion Picture – Animated	Mixing engineer	Nominated
2021	A Shaun the Sheep Movie: Farmageddon	Cinema Audio Society Award for Outstanding Achievement in Sound Mixing for a Motion Picture – Animated	Mixing engineer	Nominated
2021	Mank	Cinema Audio Society Award for Outstanding Achievement in Sound Mixing for a Motion Picture – Live Action	Mixing engineer	Nominated
2022	Sing 2	Cinema Audio Society Award for Outstanding Achievement in Sound Mixing for a Motion Picture – Animated	Mixing engineer	Nominated
2022	Raya and the Last Dragon	Cinema Audio Society Award for Outstanding Achievement in Sound Mixing for a Motion Picture – Animated	Mixing engineer	Nominated
2022	Dune: Part One	Cinema Audio Society Award for Outstanding Achievement in Sound Mixing for a Motion Picture – Live Action	Mixing engineer	Won
2022	The Book of Boba Fett	Cinema Audio Society Award for Outstanding Achievement in Sound Mixing for Television Series – Half Hour	Mixing engineer	Nominated
2023	Puss in Boots: The Last Wish	Cinema Audio Society Award for Outstanding Achievement in Sound Mixing for a Motion Picture – Animated	Mixing engineer	Nominated
2023	Minions: The Rise of Gru	Cinema Audio Society Award for Outstanding Achievement in Sound Mixing for a Motion Picture – Animated	Mixing engineer	Nominated
2025	The Wild Robot	Cinema Audio Society Award for Outstanding Achievement in Sound Mixing for a Motion Picture – Animated	Mixing engineer	Won
2025	Gladiator II	Cinema Audio Society Award for Outstanding Achievement in Sound Mixing for a Motion Picture – Live Action	Mixing engineer	Nominated
2025	Dune: Part Two	Cinema Audio Society Award for Outstanding Achievement in Sound Mixing for a Motion Picture – Live Action	Mixing engineer	Nominated
