= Scott Millan =

American sound re-recording mixer

- Born: Scott Alexander Millan; 1954 (age 71–72); Los Angeles, California, U.S.
- Occupations: Sound re-recording mixer Sound Director
- Years active: 1974–present

Scott Alexander Millan (born 1954) is an American sound re-recording mixer, a member of the board of governors of the Academy of Motion Picture Arts and Sciences, and Sound Director for Technicolor at Paramount Studios. He is known for his collaborations with Sam Mendes, Tate Taylor, Oliver Stone, Frank Marshall, as well as his early work with Judd Apatow and the Farrelly brothers. Millan has won four Academy Awards for his work in sound for motion picture.

In February 2012, Millan was honored with the Cinema Audio Society Career Achievement Award.

== Personal life ==
Millan was born in Los Angeles, California and attended Ulysses S. Grant High School in the Valley Glen neighborhood of Los Angeles. His father Art Millan and mother Lynn were both television and film actors in the 1950s. He married Deborah and had two children; the former The Young and the Restless actress Ashley Nicole Millan and Brandon Millan.

== Awards and nominations ==
=== Academy Awards ===
The Academy Awards are a set of awards given annually for excellence of cinematic achievements. The awards, organized by the Academy of Motion Picture Arts and Sciences, were first held in 1929 at the Hollywood Roosevelt Hotel. Millan has received four award from nine nominations.

Year	Category	Nominated work	Result	Ref
1993	Best Sound	Schindler's List	Nominated	
1995	Best Sound	Braveheart	Nominated	
1995	Best Sound	Apollo 13	Won	
2000	Best Sound	Gladiator	Won	
2002	Best Sound	Road to Perdition	Nominated	
2004	Best Sound Mixing	Ray	Won	
2007	Best Sound Mixing	The Bourne Ultimatum	Won	
2010	Best Sound Mixing	Salt	Nominated	
2012	Best Sound Mixing	Skyfall	Nominated	

=== BAFTA Film Awards ===
The BAFTA Award is an annual award show presented by the British Academy of Film and Television Arts. The awards were founded in 1947 as The British Film Academy, by David Lean, Alexander Korda, Carol Reed, Charles Laughton, Roger Manvell and others. Millan has received four awards from five nominations.

Year	Category	Nominated work	Result	Ref
1993	Best Sound	Schindler's List	Nominated	
1995	Best Sound	Braveheart	Won	
1995	Best Sound	Apollo 13	Nominated	
1999	Best Sound	American Beauty	Nominated	
2000	Best Sound	Gladiator	Nominated	
2004	Best Sound	Ray	Won	
2007	Best Sound	The Bourne Ultimatum	Won	
2012	Best Sound	Skyfall	Nominated	
2019	Best Sound	1917	Won	

=== Primetime Emmy Awards ===
Year	Category	Nominated work	Result	Ref
1989	Outstanding Sound Mixing for a Drama Series	Mission: Impossible (Episode: "Spy")	Nominated	
1989	Outstanding Sound Mixing for a Drama Series	Thirtysomething (Episode: "Michael Writes a Story")	Nominated	
1990	Outstanding Sound Mixing for a Drama Miniseries or Special	Challenger	Nominated	
1990	Outstanding Sound Mixing for a Drama Miniseries or Special	The Kennedys of Massachusetts: Part 1	Nominated	
1991	Outstanding Sound Mixing for a Drama Miniseries or Special	Ironclads	Nominated	
1992	Outstanding Sound Mixing for a Drama Miniseries or Special	Stalin	Won	
1998	Outstanding Sound Mixing for a Limited Series or Movie	From the Earth to the Moon: 1968	Nominated	

=== Daytime Emmy Awards ===
Year	Category	Nominated work	Result	Ref
1985	Outstanding Drama Series Technical Team	The Young and the Restless	Won	
1986	Outstanding Live and Tape Sound Mixing and Sound Effects for a Drama Series	The Young and the Restless	Won	
1987	Outstanding Live and Tape Sound Mixing and Sound Effects for a Drama Series	The Young and the Restless	Won	
1988	Outstanding Live and Tape Sound Mixing and Sound Effects for a Drama Series	The Young and the Restless	Won	
1989	Outstanding Live and Tape Sound Mixing and Sound Effects for a Drama Series	The Young and the Restless	Won	

=== Cinema Audio Society Awards ===
Year	Category	Nominated work	Result	Ref
1993	Best Sound Mixing for Motion Pictures	Schindler's List	Nominated	
1995	Best Sound Mixing for Motion Pictures	Braveheart	Won	
1995	Best Sound Mixing for Motion Pictures	Apollo 13	Nominated	
1999	Best Sound Mixing for Motion Pictures	American Beauty	Nominated	
2000	Best Sound Mixing for Motion Pictures	Gladiator	Nominated	
2002	Best Sound Mixing for Motion Pictures	Road to Perdition	Won	
2004	Best Sound Mixing for Motion Pictures	Ray	Nominated	
2004	Best Sound Mixing for Motion Pictures	The Bourne Supremacy	Nominated	
2007	Best Sound Mixing for Motion Pictures	The Bourne Ultimatum	Won	
2011	Career Achievement Award		Won	
2012	Best Sound Mixing for Motion Pictures	Skyfall	Nominated	

=== Satellite Awards ===
Year	Category	Nominated work	Result	Ref
2007	Satellite Award for Best Sound	The Bourne Ultimatum	Won	
2014	Satellite Award for Best Sound	Transformers: Age of Extinction	Nominated	
2015	Satellite Award for Best Sound	Spectre	Nominated	
2019	Satellite Award for Best Sound	1917	Nominated	
