= Chris Duesterdiek =

Canadian Production sound mixer

- Born: Christopher Robin Duesterdiek
- Occupation: Production sound mixer
- Years active: 1998–present

Christopher Robin Duesterdiek is a Canadian Production sound mixer. He is best known for his work on The Snow Walker (2003), Elysium (2013), The Interview (2014) and The Revenant (2015).

In 2016, he received an Academy Award for Best Sound Mixing nomination at the 88th Academy Awards for his work on The Revenant.

== Filmography ==
- 2015: The Revenant (production sound mixer)
- 2014: Night at the Museum: Secret of the Tomb (sound mixer)
- 2014: Seventh Son (sound mixer)
- 2014: The Interview (sound mixer)
- 2014: Big Eyes (sound mixer)
- 2013: Elysium (sound mixer: second unit, Canada)
- 2013: Motive (production sound mixer – 11 episodes)
- 2012: The Company You Keep (sound mixer)
- 2012: This Means War (production sound mixer)
- 2012: Underworld: Awakening (production sound mixer)
- 2012: This American Housewife (production sound mixer – 1 episode)
- 2010: The Wyoming Story (TV Movie) (sound mixer)
- 2010: November Christmas (TV Movie) (production sound mixer)
- 2010: Marmaduke (production sound mixer)
- 2010: Human Target (sound mixer – 11 episodes)
- 2010: Tucker and Dale vs. Evil (sound mixer)
- 2009: The Farm (production sound mixer)
- 2009: Damage (sound mixer)
- 2009: The Vampire Diaries (production sound mixer – 1 episode)
- 2006-2009: Kyle XY (production sound mixer – 39 episodes)
- 2008: Samurai Girl (production sound mixer – 1 episode)
- 2008: Stone of Destiny (location sound mixer)
- 2008: Sleepwalking (sound mixer)
- 2007: Psych (sound mixer – 7 episodes)
- 2006: Fido (production sound mixer)
- 2005-2006: Da Vinci's City Hall (TV Series) (production sound mixer – 13 episodes)
- 2005: Terminal City (TV Series) (production sound mixer – 10 episodes)
- 2005: Virtuality (Short) (sound mixer)
- 2005: Stargate SG-1 (TV Series) (sound mixer – 1 episode)
- 2004: The Keeper (location sound mixer)
- 2004: Cold Squad (TV Series) (production sound mixer – 6 episodes)
- 2004: Chestnut: Hero of Central Park (production sound mixer)
- 2004: Going the Distance (production sound mixer)
- 2004: Stargate: Atlantis (TV Series) (sound mixer – 1 episode)
- 2004: 5ive Days to Midnight (TV Mini-Series) (sound mixer)
- 2003: The Snow Walker (location sound mixer)
- 2003: A Date with Darkness: The Trial and Capture of Andrew Luster (TV Movie) (sound mixer)
- 2002: No Night Is Too Long (TV Movie) (sound mixer)
- 2002: Deadly Little Secrets (sound mixer: second unit)
- 2002: Hellraiser: Hellseeker (Video) (sound mixer)
- 2002: The Mangler 2 (Video) (sound mixer)
- 2000: The Magician's House II (TV Short) (sound mixer)
- 2000: Dark Angel (production sound mixer: second unit)
- 2000: Andromeda (TV Series) (sound mixer: second unit)
- 2000: Just Deal (TV Series) (production sound mixer)

== Awards and nominations ==
Year Ceremony	Category	Nominated work	Recipients	Result	Ref.
Academy Awards
February 28, 2016; 88th Oscars	Academy Award for Best Sound Mixing	The Revenant	Shared with: Jon Taylor; Frank A. Montaño; Randy Thom	Nominated	
British Academy Film Awards
February 8, 2016; 69th BAFTAs	BAFTA Award for Best Sound	The Revenant	Shared with: Lon Bender; Martin Hernández; Frank A. Montaño; Jon Taylor; Randy Thom	Won	
Genie Awards
May 1, 2004; 24th Genie Awards	ACCTA Award for Best Sound Editing	The Snow Walker	Shared with: Mark Berger; Dean Giammarco; Bill Sheppard	Nominated	
Gemini Awards
November 4, 2006; 21st Gemini Awards	Best Sound in a Dramatic Series	Terminal City	Shared with: Dean Giammarco; Bill Sheppard	Nominated	
November 4, 2006; 21st Gemini Awards	Best Sound in a Dramatic Series	Da Vinci's City Hall	Shared with: Miguel Nunes; James Fonnyadt; Brad Hillman; Gina Mueller; Nicole Thompson	Nominated	
