= Douglas Murray (sound editor) =

American sound editor

- Occupation: Sound editor

Douglas Murray is an American sound editor. He was nominated for an Academy Award in the category Best Sound for the film The Batman.

== Selected filmography ==
- The Batman (2022; co-nominated with Stuart Wilson, William Files and Andy Nelson)
