= Nathan Nance =

American sound engineer

- Education: Full Sail University
- Occupation: Sound engineer

Nathan Nance is an American sound engineer. He was nominated for an Academy Award in the category Best Sound for the film Mank. He also won a Primetime Emmy Award and been nominated for three more in the category Outstanding Sound Mixing for his work on the television program House of Cards. His win was shared with Lorenzo Millan and Scott R. Lewis.

== Selected filmography ==
- Mank (2020; co-nominated with Ren Klyce, Jeremy Molod, David Parker and Drew Kunin)
