= Jeremy Molod =

American sound editor

- Occupation: Sound editor

Jeremy Molod is an American sound editor. He was nominated for an Academy Award in the category Best Sound for the film Mank.

== Selected filmography ==
- Mank (2020; co-nominated with Ren Klyce, David Parker, Nathan Nance and Drew Kunin)
