= Andy Nelson (sound engineer) =

British sound mixer

- Occupations: Re-recording mixer, sound mixer, Retired Trapeze Artist
- Years active: 1980–present

Andy Nelson is a British re-recording mixer and sound engineer working in Los Angeles, California, United States. He has won two Academy Awards for Best Sound out of 25 nominations, making him the second-most nominated living person behind John Williams. He has worked on over 150 films since 1980. He was awarded the Australian Centenary Medal in the Queen's 2001 New Year Honours List for his services to Australia society and Australian film production. He received the career achievement award from the Cinema Audio Society in 2014.

== Accolades ==
=== Academy Award ===
Year (Note: Year of Ceremony)	Category	Nominated work	Result	Ref.
1989	Best Sound	Gorillas in the Mist	Nominated	
1994	Best Sound	Schindler's List	Nominated	
1996	Best Sound	Braveheart	Nominated	
1997	Best Sound	Evita	Nominated	
1998	Best Sound	L.A. Confidential	Nominated	
1999	Best Sound	The Thin Red Line	Nominated	
1999	Best Sound	Saving Private Ryan	Won	
2000	Best Sound	The Insider	Nominated	
2002	Best Sound	Moulin Rouge!	Nominated	
2004	Best Sound Mixing	Seabiscuit	Nominated	
2004	Best Sound Mixing	The Last Samurai	Nominated	
2006	Best Sound Mixing	War of the Worlds	Nominated	
2007	Best Sound Mixing	Blood Diamond	Nominated	
2010	Best Sound Mixing	Star Trek	Nominated	
2010	Best Sound Mixing	Avatar	Nominated	
2012	Best Sound Mixing	War Horse	Nominated	
2013	Best Sound Mixing	Lincoln	Nominated	
2013	Best Sound Mixing	Les Misérables	Won	
2016	Best Sound Mixing	Bridge of Spies	Nominated	
2016	Best Sound Mixing	Star Wars: The Force Awakens	Nominated	
2017	Best Sound Mixing	La La Land	Nominated	
2022	Best Sound	West Side Story	Nominated	
2023	Best Sound	The Batman	Nominated	
2023	Best Sound	Elvis	Nominated	
2025	Best Sound	Wicked	Nominated	

=== BAFTA Awards ===
Year	Category	Nominated work	Result	Ref.
1988	Best Sound	Full Metal Jacket	Nominated	
1992	Best Sound	The Commitments	Nominated	
1994	Best Sound	Schindler's List	Nominated	
1996	Best Sound	Braveheart	Won	
1997	Best Sound	Evita	Nominated	
1998	Best Sound	L.A. Confidential	Won	
1999	Best Sound	Saving Private Ryan	Won	
2002	Best Sound	Moulin Rouge!	Won	
2002	Best Sound	Shrek	Nominated	
2010	Best Sound	Avatar	Nominated	
2010	Best Sound	Star Trek	Nominated	
2012	Best Sound	War Horse	Nominated	
2013	Best Sound	Les Misérables	Won	
2016	Best Sound	Bridge of Spies	Nominated	
2016	Best Sound	Star Wars: The Force Awakens	Nominated	
2017	Best Sound	Fantastic Beasts and Where to Find Them	Nominated	
2017	Best Sound	La La Land	Nominated	
2020	Best Sound	Star Wars: The Rise of Skywalker	Nominated	
2022	Best Sound	West Side Story	Nominated	
2023	Best Sound	Elvis	Nominated	
2024	Best Sound	Ferrari	Nominated	
2025	Best Sound	Wicked	Nominated	

=== Cinema Audio Society Awards ===
Year	Category	Nominated work	Result	Ref.
1987	Outstanding Achievement in Sound Mixing for Motion Pictures	Full Metal Jacket	Nominated	
1991	Outstanding Achievement in Sound Mixing for Motion Pictures	The Commitments	Nominated	
1994	Outstanding Achievement in Sound Mixing for Motion Pictures	Schindler's List	Nominated	
1996	Outstanding Achievement in Sound Mixing for Motion Pictures	Braveheart	Nominated	
1998	Outstanding Achievement in Sound Mixing for Motion Pictures	L.A. Confidential	Nominated	
1999	Outstanding Achievement in Sound Mixing for Motion Pictures	Saving Private Ryan	Won	
1999	Outstanding Achievement in Sound Mixing for Motion Pictures	The X-Files	Nominated	
2002	Outstanding Achievement in Sound Mixing for Motion Pictures	Moulin Rouge!	Nominated	
2002	Outstanding Achievement in Sound Mixing for Motion Pictures	Shrek	Nominated	
2003	Outstanding Achievement in Sound Mixing for Motion Pictures	Catch Me if You Can	Nominated	
2004	Outstanding Achievement in Sound Mixing for Motion Pictures	The Last Samurai	Nominated	
2004	Outstanding Achievement in Sound Mixing for Motion Pictures	Seabiscuit	Nominated	
2006	Outstanding Achievement in Sound Mixing for Motion Pictures	War of the Worlds	Nominated	
2007	Outstanding Achievement in Sound Mixing for Motion Pictures	Blood Diamond	Nominated	
2010	Outstanding Achievement in Sound Mixing for Motion Pictures	Avatar	Nominated	
2010	Outstanding Achievement in Sound Mixing for Motion Pictures	Star Trek	Nominated	
2012	Outstanding Achievement in Sound Mixing for Motion Pictures	Super 8	Nominated	
2013	Outstanding Achievement in Sound Mixing for a Motion Picture – Animated	Rise of the Guardians	Nominated	
2013	Outstanding Achievement in Sound Mixing for a Motion Picture – Live Action	Les Misérables	Won	
2013	Outstanding Achievement in Sound Mixing for a Motion Picture – Live Action	Lincoln	Nominated	
2016	Outstanding Achievement in Sound Mixing for a Motion Picture – Live Action	Bridge of Spies	Nominated	
2016	Outstanding Achievement in Sound Mixing for a Motion Picture – Live Action	Star Wars: The Force Awakens	Nominated	
2017	Outstanding Achievement in Sound Mixing for a Motion Picture – Live Action	La La Land	Won	
2022	Outstanding Achievement in Sound Mixing for a Motion Picture – Live Action	West Side Story	Nominated	
2023	Outstanding Achievement in Sound Mixing for a Motion Picture – Live Action	The Batman	Nominated	
2023	Outstanding Achievement in Sound Mixing for a Motion Picture – Live Action	Elvis	Nominated	
2024	Outstanding Achievement in Sound Mixing for a Motion Picture – Live Action	Ferrari	Nominated	
2025	Outstanding Achievement in Sound Mixing for a Motion Picture – Live Action	Wicked	Nominated	

=== Satellite Awards ===
Year	Category	Nominated work	Result	Ref.
2004	Best Sound	Seabiscuit	Nominated	
2005	Best Sound	The Phantom of the Opera	Nominated	
2005	Best Sound	Star Wars: Episode III – Revenge of the Sith	Won	
2008	Best Sound	Australia	Nominated	
2011	Best Sound	Super 8	Nominated	
2011	Best Sound	War Horse	Nominated	
2012	Best Sound	Les Misérables	Won	
2012	Best Sound	Snow White and the Huntsman	Nominated	
2017	Best Sound	La La Land	Nominated	
2023	Best Sound	Babylon	Nominated	
2023	Best Sound	Elvis	Nominated	
2024	Best Sound	Ferrari	Nominated	
2025	Best Sound	Wicked	Won	
2026	Best Sound	Wicked: For Good	Nominated	
