= Louis Armstrong's Black & Blues =

- Directed by: Sacha Jenkins
- Produced by: Sara Bernstein; Sacha Jenkins; Justin Wilkes; Julie Anderson
- Cinematography: Ed Lachman
- Production companies: Apple Original Films; PolyGram Entertainment; Imagine Documentaries
- Distributed by: Apple TV+
- Release date: October 28, 2022
- Running time: 104 minutes
- Country: United States
- Language: English

Louis Armstrong's Black & Blues is a 2022 American documentary film about American trumpeter Louis Armstrong.

== Reception ==
On review aggregator website Rotten Tomatoes, the film holds an approval rating of 98% based on 54 reviews, with an average rating of 8.2/10. The website's consensus reads: "A fitting tribute to a titan of American music, Louis Armstrong's Black & Blues honors its subject by letting him tell his story in his own words."

The New Yorker said that while the film is "blandly conventional in its form", its wide range of archive clips and footage of Armstrong is "inspiring and illuminating".
