= William Files =

American sound engineer

- Occupation: Sound engineer

William Files is an American sound engineer. He was nominated for an Academy Award in the category Best Sound for the film The Batman.

== Selected filmography ==
- The Batman (2022; co-nominated with Stuart Wilson, Douglas Murray and Andy Nelson)
