= Greg P. Russell =

American sound engineer

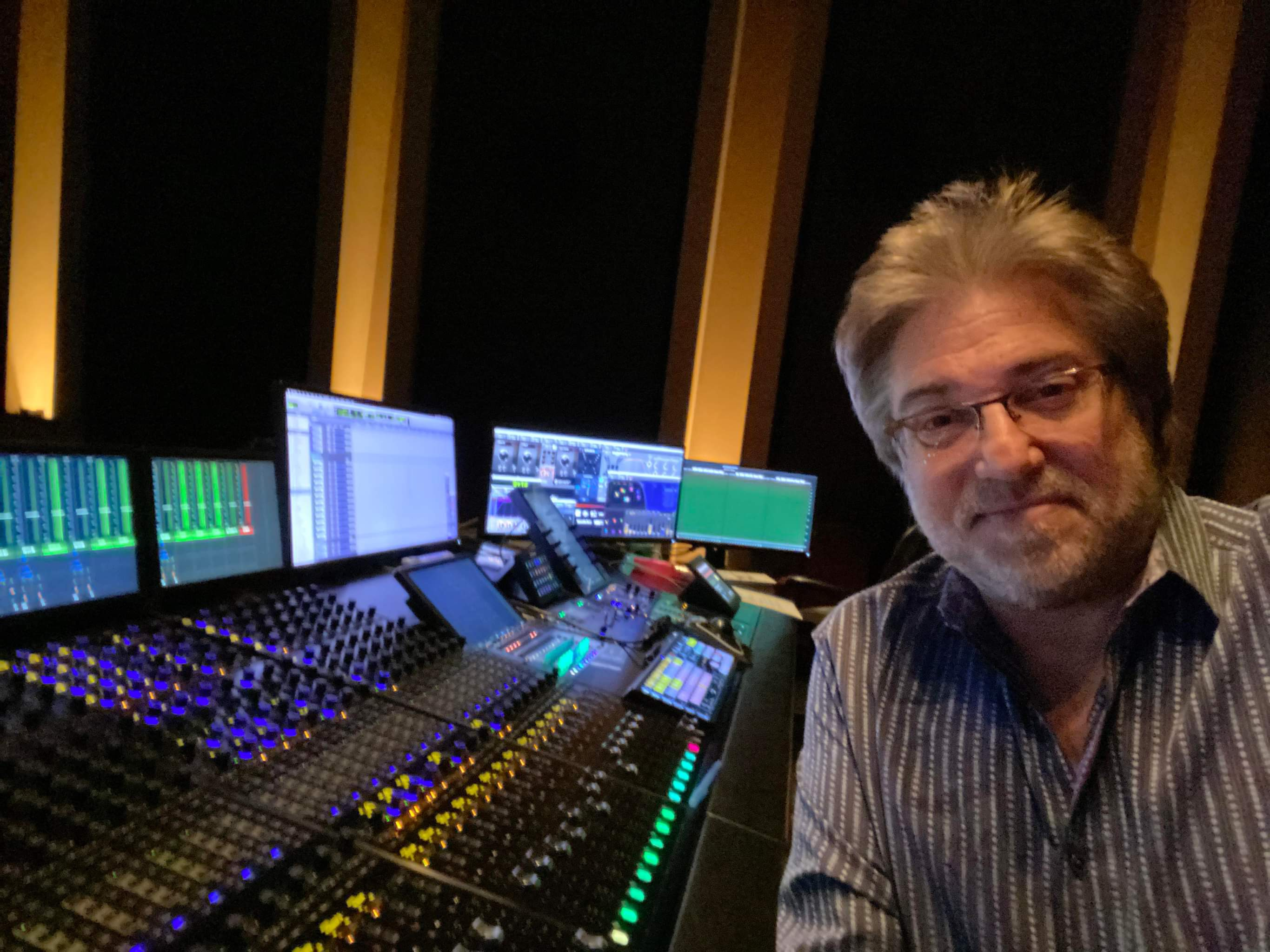
- Occupation: Re-Recording Mixer
- Years active: 1977-present

Greg P. Russell is an American re-recording mixer. He is a 16-time Academy Award nominated post-production sound mixer who has worked in the film industry for more than 40 years, contributing to over 235 feature films. He had been the individual with the most Oscar nominations without a single win, with 16 nominations, before songwriter Diane Warren received her 17th nomination in 2026. He received Oscar nominations for his work on Black Rain, The Rock, Con Air, Armageddon, The Mask of Zorro, The Patriot, Pearl Harbor, Spider-Man, Spider- Man 2, Memoirs of a Geisha, Apocalypto, Transformers 1, 2 & 3, Salt and Skyfall. Other nominations include 12 CAS awards, two BAFTA's and two Emmys, with a Daytime Emmy Award win in 1989.

Other notable credits include The Usual Suspects, Stargate, National Treasure, 13 Hours, Point Break, The Nightmare Before Christmas, The Da Vinci Code, Rocky V, Crimson Tide, My Cousin Vinny, Men in Black II, Star Trek IV: The Voyage Home, Hairspray (1988), The Bodyguard, Terminator 3, Terminator 5, Tremors, RoboCop, Enemy of the State, Man on Fire, Tommy Boy, Starship Troopers, Days of Thunder, Godzilla, Spy Game, and Steel Magnolias (1989).

== Collaborations ==
Russell has collaborated with some of the many well-known filmmakers:

- Michael Bay
- Sam Raimi
- Roland Emmerich
- Ron Howard
- Tony Scott
- Ridley Scott
- Sam Mendes
- James L. Brooks
- Phillip Noyce
- William Friedkin
- Tim Burton
- Kathryn Bigelow
- Barry Sonnenfeld
- Barbra Streisand
- Mel Gibson
- Rob Marshall
- Gabriele Muccino
- Jon Turteltaub
- Rob Reiner
- Carl Reiner
- Paul Verhoeven
- Diane Keaton
- Adrian Lyne
- Martin Campbell
- Bryan Singer
- Jonathan Mostow
- Richard Donner
- John Avildsen
- Herbert Ross
- Harold Becker
- Jonathan Lynn
- Robert Towne
- John Waters
- Michel Gondry
- Simon West
- Ron Underwood
- Dominic Sena
- Lawrence Kasdan
- Scott Waugh
- Nicholas Meyer

== Accolades ==
Award	Year	Category	Film	Result
Academy Awards	2013	Best Sound Mixing	Skyfall	Nominated
Academy Awards	2012	Best Sound Mixing	Transformers: Dark of the Moon	Nominated
Academy Awards	2011	Best Sound Mixing	Salt	Nominated
Academy Awards	2010	Best Sound Mixing	Transformers: Revenge of the Fallen	Nominated
Academy Awards	2008	Best Sound Mixing	Transformers	Nominated
Academy Awards	2007	Best Sound Mixing	Apocalypto	Nominated
Academy Awards	2006	Best Sound Mixing	Memoirs of a Geisha	Nominated
Academy Awards	2005	Best Sound Mixing	Spider Man 2	Nominated
Academy Awards	2003	Best Sound	Spider Man	Nominated
Academy Awards	2002	Best Sound	Pearl Harbor	Nominated
Academy Awards	2001	Best Sound	The Patriot	Nominated
Academy Awards	1999	Best Sound	Armageddon	Nominated
Academy Awards	1999	Best Sound	The Mask of Zorro	Nominated
Academy Awards	1998	Best Sound	Con Air	Nominated
Academy Awards	1997	Best Sound	The Rock	Nominated
Academy Awards	1990	Best Sound	Black Rain	Nominated
British Academy Film Awards	2013	Best Sound	Skyfall	Nominated
British Academy Film Awards	2005	Best Sound	Spider Man 2	Nominated
Cinema Audio Society Awards	2025	Outstanding Achievement in Sound Mixing for Television Series - One Hour	Shōgun (for "Broken to the Fist")	Won
Cinema Audio Society Awards	2025	Outstanding Achievement in Sound Mixing for Motion Pictures - Animated	Mufasa: The Lion King	Nominated
Cinema Audio Society Awards	2023	Outstanding Achievement in Sound Mixing for Motion Pictures - Animated	Puss in Boots: The Last Wish	Nominated
Cinema Audio Society Awards	2013	Outstanding Achievement in Sound Mixing for Motion Pictures - Live Action	Skyfall	Nominated
Cinema Audio Society Awards	2010	Outstanding Achievement in Sound Mixing for Motion Pictures	Transformers: Revenge of the Fallen	Nominated
Cinema Audio Society Awards	2008	Outstanding Achievement in Sound Mixing for Motion Pictures	Transformers	Nominated
Cinema Audio Society Awards	2006	Outstanding Achievement in Sound Mixing for Motion Pictures	Memoirs of a Geisha	Nominated
Cinema Audio Society Awards	2005	Outstanding Achievement in Sound Mixing for Motion Pictures	Spider Man 2	Nominated
Cinema Audio Society Awards	2003	Outstanding Sound Mixing for Motion Pictures	Spider Man	Nominated
Cinema Audio Society Awards	2002	Outstanding Sound Mixing for Motion Pictures	Pearl Harbor	Nominated
Cinema Audio Society Awards	2001	Outstanding Achievement in Sound Mixing for a Feature Film	The Patriot	Nominated
Cinema Audio Society Awards	1999	Outstanding Achievement in Sound Mixing for Feature Films	Armageddon	Nominated
Cinema Audio Society Awards	1999	Outstanding Achievement in Sound Mixing for Feature Films	The Mask of Zorro	Nominated
Cinema Audio Society Awards	1997	Outstanding Achievement in Sound Mixing for Feature Films	The Rock	Nominated
Primetime Emmy Awards	2024	Outstanding Sound Mixing for a Comedy or Drama Series (One Hour)	Shōgun (for "Broken to the Fist")	Won
Daytime Emmy Awards	1989	Outstanding Film Sound Mixing	Muppet Babies	Won
Daytime Emmy Awards	1988	Outstanding Film Sound Mixing	Muppet Babies	Nominated
Satellite Awards	2017	Best Sound (Editing & Mixing)	13 Hours	Nominated
Satellite Awards	2015	Best Sound (Editing & Mixing)	Transformers: Age of Extinction	Nominated
Satellite Awards	2011	Best Sound (Editing & Mixing)	Transformers: Dark of the Moon	Nominated
Satellite Awards	2009	Best Sound (Editing & Mixing)	Transformers: Revenge of the Fallen	Nominated
Satellite Awards	2006	Best Sound (Editing & Mixing)	The Da Vinci Code	Nominated
Satellite Awards	2005	Best Sound (Editing & Mixing)	Spider Man 2	Nominated
Online Film and Television Association Awards	2013	Best Sound Mixing	Skyfall	Nominated
Online Film and Television Association Awards	2008	Best Sound Mixing	Transformers	Nominated
Online Film and Television Association Awards	2005	Best Sound Mixing	Spider Man 2	Nominated
Online Film and Television Association Awards	2002	Best Sound Mixing	Pearl Harbor	Nominated
Online Film and Television Association Awards	1999	Best Sound Mixing	Enemy of the State	Nominated
International Online Cinema Awards	2013	Best Sound Mixing	Skyfall	Nominated
International Online Cinema Awards	2005	Best Sound Mixing	Spider Man 2	Nominated
Gold Derby Awards	2013	Best Sound Mixing	Skyfall	Nominated
Gold Derby Awards	2005	Best Sound Mixing	Spider Man 2	Nominated
Hollywood Press Association Awards	2023	Outstanding Sound - Theatrical Feature	Puss in Boots: The Last Wish	Nominated
