= Kevin O'Connell (sound mixer) =

American sound engineer (born 1957)

- Born: November 27, 1957 (age 68); Long Island, New York
- Occupation: Re-recording mixer
- Years active: 1980–present

Kevin O'Connell is a sound re-recording mixer. He held the record for most Academy Award nominations without a win at 20, until he finally won his first Academy Award for Hacksaw Ridge (2016) at the 89th Academy Awards in 2017.

== Early life and career ==
O'Connell was born on Long Island, New York. and raised in Los Angeles, California. At 18, he became a projectionist at 20th Century Fox Studios, where his mother was a secretary for the head of the sound department.

Subsequently, failing the trade union examination for the job, he became a Los Angeles County firefighter for a year. At the behest of his concerned mother, alarmed at his gaunt and charred appearance following a brush fire in Sylmar, Los Angeles, he obtained a job as a machine-room operator at Warner Hollywood Studios, also known as Samuel Goldwyn Studios in 1978, where he worked on films including Grease (1978). Becoming a recording technician, he earned his first screen credit on The Empire Strikes Back (1980). His first credit as a sound mixer was on Dead Men Don't Wear Plaid (1982).

== Later career ==
In 1993, O'Connell joined Sony Pictures as a supervising sound mixer, working on films include Armageddon (1998), Spider-Man (2002), and Transformers (2007). In October 2013, he was hired to provide mixing services and take a creative leadership role at Todd Soundelux, working in that company's Todd-AO division in Santa Monica, California. O'Connell returned to Sony Pictures Post Production Services in 2015.

He served a term as the representative of the Sound Branch in the Board of Governors of the Academy of Motion Picture Arts and Sciences.

== Academy Award victory ==
O'Connell held the record for most Academy Award nominations without a win at 20, having originally set the record in 2006 with his 18th nomination and loss, making him the "unluckiest nominee in the history of the Academy Awards". In 2017, he won his first Academy Award at the 89th Academy Awards for Hacksaw Ridge (2016).

In his acceptance speech at the ceremony, held on February 26, 2017, O'Connell thanked his mother, Skippy, who had urged him into his profession.

== Personal life ==
In 2001, Kevin and Heather O'Connell were married.

== Accolades ==
=== Academy Awards ===
Year	Nominated work	Result	Lost to
1983	Terms of Endearment	Nominated	The Right Stuff
1984	Dune	Nominated	Amadeus
1985	Silverado	Nominated	Out of Africa
1986	Top Gun	Nominated	Platoon
1989	Black Rain	Nominated	Glory
1990	Days of Thunder	Nominated	Dances with Wolves
1992	A Few Good Men	Nominated	The Last of the Mohicans
1995	Crimson Tide	Nominated	Apollo 13
1996	Twister	Nominated	The English Patient
1996	The Rock	Nominated	The English Patient
1997	Con Air	Nominated	Titanic
1998	The Mask of Zorro	Nominated	Saving Private Ryan
1998	Armageddon	Nominated	Saving Private Ryan
2000	The Patriot	Nominated	Gladiator
2001	Pearl Harbor	Nominated	Black Hawk Down
2002	Spider-Man	Nominated	Chicago
2004	Spider-Man 2	Nominated	Ray
2005	Memoirs of a Geisha	Nominated	King Kong
2006	Apocalypto	Nominated	Dreamgirls
2007	Transformers	Nominated	The Bourne Ultimatum
2016	Hacksaw Ridge	Won	
2023	Oppenheimer	Nominated	The Zone of Interest

=== Primetime Emmy Award ===
In 1989, O'Connell, along with James L. Aicholtz, Michael Herbick and Don Johnson, won the Primetime Emmy Award for Outstanding Sound Mixing for a Miniseries or Movie for the television miniseries Lonesome Dove (1989).

=== Cinema Audio Society Award ===
Nominations

1. Outstanding Achievement in Sound Mixing for Motion Pictures – Live Action – Hacksaw Ridge (2016) (shared with seven colleagues)

== See also ==
- List of Academy Award records
