= Cinema Audio Society Awards 2007 =

44th Cinema Audio Society Awards

44th CAS Awards

February 16, 2008

Theatrical Releases:
No Country for Old Men

The 44th Cinema Audio Society Awards, which were held on February 16, 2008, honored the outstanding achievements in sound mixing in film and television of 2007.

== Winners and nominees ==
=== Film ===
- No Country for Old Men
  - 300
  - The Bourne Ultimatum
  - Into the Wild
  - Transformers

=== Television ===
==== Series ====
- CSI: Crime Scene Investigation (Episode: "Living Doll")
  - 24 (Episode: "10:00 p.m. – 11:00 p.m.")
  - Jericho (Episode: "Why We Fight")
  - Scrubs (Episode: "My Musical")
  - The Sopranos (Episode: "The Blue Comet")

==== Miniseries or Television Film ====
- Bury My Heart at Wounded Knee
  - The Company (Episode: "Part 2")
  - High School Musical 2
  - The Kill Point (Episode: "The Great Ape Escape")
  - Tin Man (Episode: "Into the Storm")
