= Steve Pederson (sound engineer) =

American sound engineer

- Occupation: Sound engineer
- Years active: 1978 – present

Steve Pederson is an American sound engineer. He won an Academy Award for Best Sound and was nominated for another in the same category. He has worked on more than 130 films since 1978.

== Selected filmography ==
Pederson won an Academy Award for Best Sound and has been nominated for another one:

Won

- Apollo 13 (1995)

Nominated

- Schindler's List (1993)
