= Lee Orloff =

American sound engineer

- Occupation: Sound engineer
- Years active: 1984–present

Lee Orloff is an American sound engineer. He won an Academy Award for Best Sound and has been nominated for six more in the same category. He has worked on over 60 films since 1984.

== Selected filmography ==
Orloff won an Academy Award for Best Sound and has been nominated for another six:

Won

- Terminator 2: Judgment Day (1991)

Nominated

- The Abyss (1989)
- Geronimo: An American Legend (1993)
- The Insider (1999)
- The Patriot (2000)
- Pirates of the Caribbean: The Curse of the Black Pearl (2003)
- Pirates of the Caribbean: Dead Man's Chest (2006)
