= Mark Weingarten =

American production sound mixer

- Occupation: Production sound mixer
- Years active: 1987-present

Mark Weingarten is an American production sound mixer. He has been nominated for five Academy Awards for Best Sound, winning in 2017 for Dunkirk and in 2022 for Top Gun: Maverick. He has worked on more than 120 films since 1987. In addition, he won an Emmy for the television show The West Wing.

== Selected filmography ==
- The Curious Case of Benjamin Button (2008)
- The Social Network (2010)
- Interstellar (2014)
- Dunkirk (2017)
- Top Gun: Maverick (2022)
