= Ron Bochar =

American film sound engineer

Ron Bochar is an American film sound engineer. On January 24, 2012, he was nominated for an Academy Award for the movie Moneyball.
