= Michael Hedges (sound engineer) =

New Zealand sound engineer

- Born: Wellington, New Zealand
- Occupation: Sound engineer
- Years active: 1990–present

Michael Hedges is a sound engineer from Wellington, New Zealand. He attended Naenae College. He has won two Academy Awards for Best Sound Mixing and has been nominated for another two in the same category. He has worked on more than 70 films since 1990.

== Selected filmography ==
Hedges has won two Academy Awards and has been nominated for another:

Won

- The Lord of the Rings: The Return of the King (2003)
- King Kong (2005)

Nominated

- The Lord of the Rings: The Two Towers (2002)
- The Hobbit: The Desolation of Smaug (2013)
- Avatar: The Way of Water (2022)
