= Greg Orloff =

American sound engineer

- Occupation: Film sound mixer
- Years active: 1979–present

Greg Orloff is an American film sound mixer. He has won an Academy Award for Best Sound and has been nominated for another three in the same category. He has won a British Academy Award (BAFTA) and has been nominated for another three in the same category. He has won two Cinema Audio Society awards and has been nominated another six times. He has also been nominated for six Emmy Awards. He is known for his frequent collaborations with The Coen Brothers and Adam Sandler. He has worked on over 200 films since 1979. He is the brother of screenwriter John Orloff.

== Selected filmography ==
Orloff has won an Academy Award and has been nominated for another three:

Won

- Ray (2004)

Nominated

- No Country for Old Men (2007)
- True Grit (2010)
- Inside Llewyn Davis (2013)
