= Michael Semanick =

American sound engineer (born 1963)

- Born: 1963 (age 62–63)
- Occupation: Sound engineer
- Years active: 1987–present

Michael Semanick (born 1963) is an American sound engineer, credited as a sound re-recording mixer. He has won two Academy Awards for Best Sound and has been nominated for nine more in the same category. He has worked on more than 110 films since 1987.

== Selected filmography ==
Semanick has won two Academy Awards and has been nominated for another nine:

Won

- The Lord of the Rings: The Return of the King (2003)
- King Kong (2005)

Nominated

- The Lord of the Rings: The Fellowship of the Ring (2001)
- The Lord of the Rings: The Two Towers (2002)
- Ratatouille (2007)
- WALL-E (2008)
- The Curious Case of Benjamin Button (2008)
- The Social Network (2010)
- The Girl with the Dragon Tattoo (2011)
- The Hobbit: The Desolation of Smaug (2013)
- Star Wars: The Last Jedi (2017)
