= Scott D. Smith =

Sound engineer

- Born: March 26, 1953 (age 73); Chicago, Illinois, U.S.
- Occupation: Sound engineer
- Years active: 1975–present

Scott D. Smith (born March 26, 1953) is an American sound engineer. He has been nominated for two Academy Awards in the category Best Sound. He has worked on over 60 films since 1975. He was the production sound mixer on The Bear (2022–2026).

== Selected filmography ==
- Under Siege (1992)
- The Fugitive (1993)
