= David Parker (sound engineer) =

American sound engineer

- Born: 1951 (age 74–75)
- Occupation: Sound engineer
- Years active: 1980–present

David Parker (born 1951) is an American sound engineer. He won two Academy Awards for Best Sound and was nominated for another five in the same category. He has worked on more than 180 films since 1980.

== Selected filmography ==
Parker won two Academy Awards for Best Sound and was nominated for another five:

Won

- The English Patient (1996)
- The Bourne Ultimatum (2007)

Nominated

- Never Cry Wolf (1983)
- Pirates of the Caribbean: The Curse of the Black Pearl (2003)
- The Curious Case of Benjamin Button (2008)
- The Social Network (2010)
- The Girl with the Dragon Tattoo (2011)
- Rogue One (2016)
- Star Wars: The Last Jedi (2017)
