= Mark Ulano =

American sound artist for film

- Born: June 12, 1954 (age 72); New York City, New York, United States
- Occupation: Sound engineer
- Years active: 1975–present
- Spouse: Patrushkha Mierzwa (1981-present)
- Children: 2

Mark Ulano (June 12, 1954) is an Academy Award-winning American production sound mixer. He has won an Academy Award for Best Sound and has been nominated for three in the same category.

He has been recording sound for film professionally since 1976. His work on Titanic won him an Academy Award for Sound Mixing as well as the Cinema Audio Society Award for Best Sound mixing for a Feature Film. He was also Oscar-nominated for Once Upon a Time in Hollywood, Inglorious Basterds, and Ad Astra. Most recently, he served as production sound mixer for Killers of the Flower Moon, directed by Martin Scorsese. His other credits include The Hateful Eight, Django Unchained, Kill Bill Vols. I & 2, Jackie Brown, Iron Man, Iron Man 2, Cowboys & Aliens, The Master, Wedding Crashers and over one hundred other films. He has had a 29 year collaboration with Quentin Tarantino.

Ulano has served five terms as president of IATSE Local 695 (the film sound union) and also served five terms on the executive committee of the Academy of Motion Pictures Arts and Sciences Sound Branch. He has sat ten terms as a board member for the Cinema Audio Society and served as president of that organization for two terms. He is also in the final stages of completing a comprehensive text on the work of Production Sound Mixing.

He has authored over 50 articles, interviews and reviews related to Production Sound Mixing. He has frequently been a guest speaker at sound symposiums internationally, including The Directors Guild of America, the Rycote World Sound Symposium, The Norwegian Bjoksjo Sound Symposium, The Beijing Film Academy, Digital Video Expo, AES and Cinema Audio Society. He has also directed documentaries including I Love What I Do and Julianna: A Portrait.

== Selected filmography ==
Won

- Titanic (1997)

Nominated

- Inglourious Basterds (2009)
- Ad Astra (2019)
- Once Upon a Time in Hollywood (2019)
