= Chris Burdon =

American sound engineer

Chris Burdon is a sound engineer. Burdon and his fellow sound engineers earned a nomination for an Academy Award for Best Sound Mixing for the 2013 film Captain Phillips. Burdon won the Academy Award for Best Sound for the 2022 film Top Gun: Maverick. He was nominated alongside James Mather, Chris Munro, and Mark Taylor for an Academy Award for Best Sound for the 2023 film Mission: Impossible – Dead Reckoning Part One.
