= Geoffrey Patterson =

American sound engineer

- Born: 1954 (age 71–72); Detroit, Michigan, United States
- Occupation: Sound engineer
- Years active: 1985–present

Geoffrey Patterson (born 1954) is an American sound engineer. He has been nominated for two Academy Awards in the category Best Sound Mixing. He has worked on more than 100 films since 1985.

== Selected filmography ==
- Leprechaun (1993)
- Twister (1996)
- Transformers: Revenge of the Fallen (2009)
