= Tom Fleischman =

American sound engineer (born 1951)

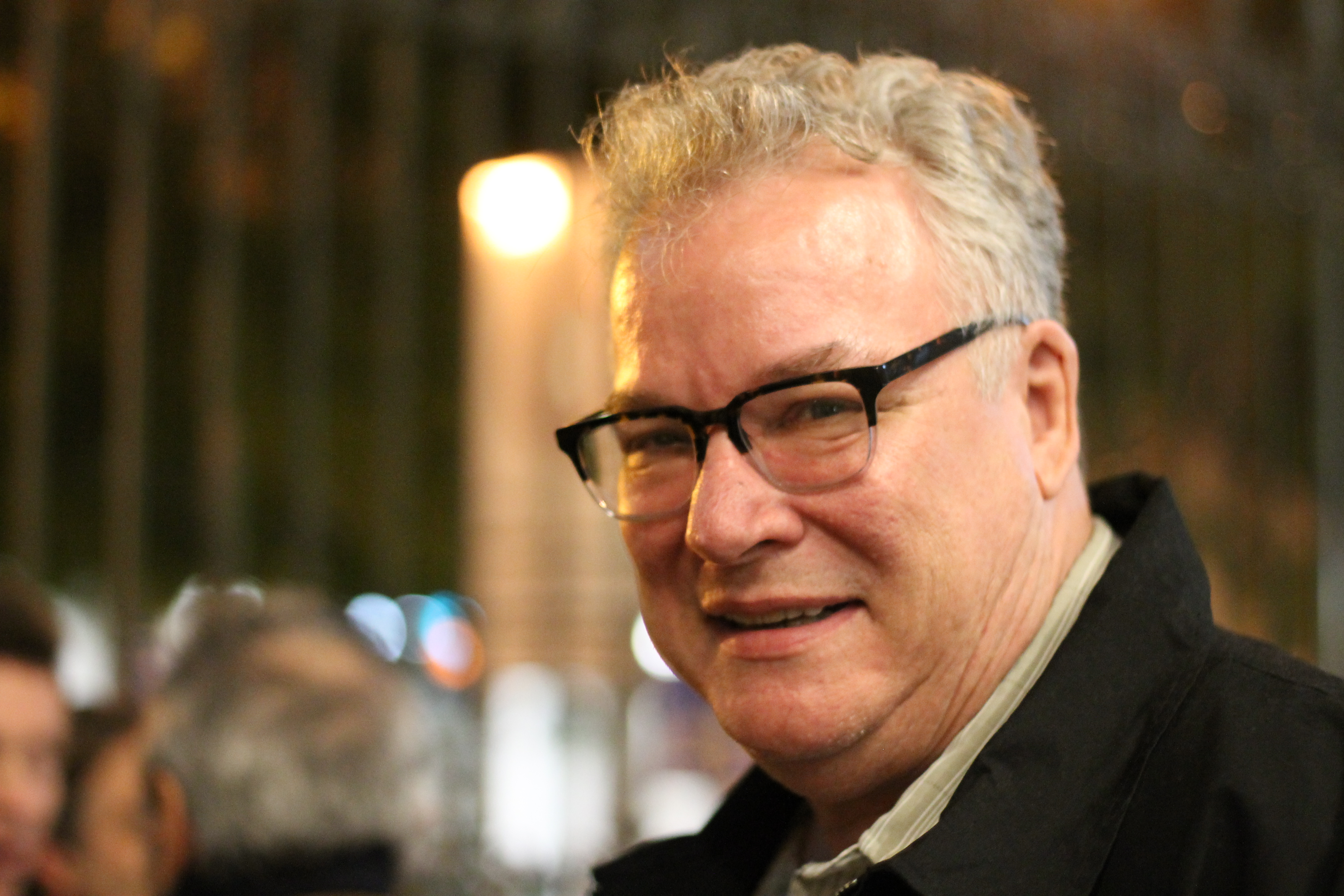
- Fleischman in 2018
- Born: Thomas Allen Fleischman; September 15, 1951 (age 74); New York City, New York, United States
- Occupation: Sound engineer
- Years active: 1978-present
- Children: 3

Tom Fleischman (born September 15, 1951) is an American sound engineer and re-recording mixer. He is the son of film editor Dede Allen, and documentary producer, director, and writer Stephen Fleischman. He has worked on over 170 films since 1978. He won an Academy Award in 2011 in the category Academy Award for Best Sound Mixing for Hugo and has received four other Oscar nominations for Reds (1982), The Silence of the Lambs (1992), Gangs of New York (2003), and The Aviator (2004).

In addition to his work in feature films, he has also done work in television, winning five Emmy Awards in 1986 for ABC Afterschool Specials: Can A Guy Say No, in 2006 for Martin Scorsese's No Direction Home: Bob Dylan, in 2013 for History of the Eagles, Boardwalk Empire: The Milkmaid's Lot, in 2019 for Free Solo and also garnered Emmy nominations for Scorsese's George Harrison: Living in the Material World, and the HBO television series Boardwalk Empire. He resigned his membership of the Academy of Motion Picture Arts and Sciences (AMPAS) on 5 March 2022, citing changes to the broadcast of the 94th Academy Awards Ceremony where eight categories including Best Sound were not presented live but rather during the commercial breaks.

== Selected filmography ==
- Reds (1981)
- The Silence of the Lambs (1991)
- Gangs of New York (2002)
- The Aviator (2004)
- Hugo (2011)
- The Irishman (2019)
