= Frank A. Montaño =

Re-recording mixer

- Occupation: Re-recording mixer
- Years active: 1987–present

Frank A. Montaño is an American re-recording mixer. He has been nominated for nine Academy Awards for Best Sound. He has worked on nearly 145 films since 1987.

== Selected filmography ==
- Under Siege (1992)
- The Fugitive (1993)
- Clear and Present Danger (1994)
- Batman Forever (1995)
- Wanted (2008)
- Birdman (2014)
- Unbroken (2014)
- The Revenant (2015)
- First Man (2018)
