= Tod A. Maitland =

American sound engineer

- Born: 1957 (age 68–69); New York City, United States
- Occupation: Sound engineer
- Years active: 1978-present

Tod A. Maitland (born 1957) is an American sound engineer. He has been nominated for six Academy Awards in the category Best Sound. He has worked on more than 100 films since 1978.

== Selected filmography ==
- Born on the Fourth of July (1989)
- JFK (1991)
- Seabiscuit (2003)
- Life of Crime (2014)
- The Irishman (2019)
- Joker (2019)
