= Peter J. Devlin =

American sound engineer

- Occupation: Sound engineer
- Years active: 1988-present

Peter J. Devlin is an American sound engineer. He has been nominated for five Academy Awards in the category Best Sound. He has worked on more than 70 films since 1988.

== Selected filmography ==
- Pearl Harbor (2001)
- Transformers (2007)
- Star Trek (2009)
- Transformers: Dark of the Moon (2011)
- Black Panther (2018)
