= Jon Taylor (sound mixer) =

American audio engineer

- Occupation: Re-recording mixer
- Years active: 1989-present

Jon Taylor is an American re-recording mixer. He has been nominated for four Academy Awards in the category Best Sound Mixing. He has worked on nearly 120 films since 1989. He won two Emmy Awards for Outstanding Sound Mixing for the television show Flipper in 1996–1997.

== Selected filmography ==
- The Revenant (2015)
- Birdman (2014)
- Unbroken (2014)
- First Man (2018)
