= David Giammarco (sound engineer) =

Canadian sound engineer

- Occupation: Sound engineer
- Years active: 1985-present

David Giammarco is a Canadian sound engineer. He has been nominated for three Academy Awards in the category Best Sound Mixing. He has worked on over 70 films since 1985.

== Selected filmography ==
- 3:10 to Yuma (2007)
- Moneyball (2011)
- Ford v Ferrari (2019)
- A Complete Unknown (2024)
