= Doc Kane =

American sound engineer

- Born: Louis Kane
- Occupation: Sound engineer
- Years active: 1984-present

Doc Kane is an American sound engineer. He has been nominated for four Academy Awards in the category Best Sound, and won Best Sound Editing at the 77th Academy Awards for The Incredibles. He has worked on nearly 500 films since 1984.

== Selected filmography ==
- Twilight Zone: The Movie (1983)
- St. Elmo's Fire (1985)
- The Little Mermaid (1989) original dialogue recordist (uncredited)
- Gremlins 2: The New Batch original dialogue mixer: L.A. Studios
- DuckTales the Movie: Treasure of the Lost Lamp (1990) adr mixer (uncredited)
- The Rescuers Down Under (1990) adr mixer (uncredited)
- Beauty and the Beast (1991) adr mixer
- Father of the Bride (1991) adr mixer
- Aladdin (1992) original dialogue recordist
- The Muppet Christmas Carol (1993) adr mixer
- Blood In, Blood Out (1993) adr mixer
- Homeward Bound: The Incredible Journey (1993) adr mixer
- Hocus Pocus (1993) adr mixer
- The Flintstones (1994) adr mixer
- The Lion King (1994) original dialogue recordist
- Color of Night (1994) adr mixer
- A Goofy Movie (1995) original dialogue recordist
- Man of the House (1995) adr mixer
- Pocahontas (1995) original dialogue recordist
- Toy Story (1995) dialogue recordist
- Father of the Bride Part II (1995)
- Tom and Huck (1995)
- Homeward Bound II: Lost in San Francisco (1996)
- The Hunchback of Notre Dame (1996)
- 101 Dalamatians (1996)
- Hercules (1997)
- George of the Jungle (1997)
- Flubber (1997)
- Mr. Magoo (1997)
- Deep Rising (1998)
- Quest for Camelot (1998)
- Mulan (1998)
- Tarzan (1999)
- Inspector Gadget (1999)
- The Iron Giant (1999)
- Toy Story 2 (1999)
- Dinosaur (2000)
- The Little Mermaid II: Return to the Sea (2000)
- Rugrats in Paris: The Movie (2000; uncredited)
- The Emperor's New Groove (2000)
- Atlantis: The Lost Empire (2001)
- Cats and Dogs (2001)
- The Majestic (2001)
- Lilo & Stitch (2002)
- Treasure Planet (2002)
- The Incredibles (2004)
- Pooh's Heffalump Movie (2005)
- The Pacifier (2005)
- Ratatouille (2007)
- Toy Story 3 (2010)
- Bridge of Spies (2015)
- The Good Dinosaur (2015)
- The SpongeBob Movie: Sponge Out of Water (2015)
- Doctor Strange (2016)
- Finding Dory (2016)
- Moana (2016)
- Rogue One: A Star Wars Story (2016)
- Zootopia (2016)
- Cars 3 (2017)
- Coco (2017)
- A Cure for Wellness (2017)
- The Post (2017)
- Star Wars: The Last Jedi (2017)
- Thor: Ragnarok (2017)
- Avengers: Infinity War (2018)
- Black Panther (2018)
- Incredibles 2 (2018)
- Ready Player One (2018)
- Solo: A Star Wars Story (2018)
- Avengers: Endgame (2019)
- Spider-Man: Far from Home (2019)
- Cruella (2021)
- Black Widow (2021)
- Shang-Chi and the Legend of the Ten Rings (2021)
- Eternals (2021)
- Clifford the Big Red Dog (2021)
- Spider-Man: No Way Home (2021)
