= Gary Rizzo =

American sound engineer

Gary A. Rizzo
- Born: New Jersey, United States
- Occupation: Re-recording mixer
- Years active: 1994–present

Gary A. Rizzo is an American re-recording mixer. He studied audio engineering at Full Sail University and works at Lucasfilm's Skywalker Sound. He has won three Academy Awards for Best Sound Mixing and has been nominated for another five. He has worked on more than 200 films since 1994.

== Selected filmography ==
Rizzo has won three Academy Awards and has been nominated for another five:

Won

- Inception (2010)
- Dunkirk (2017)
- F1 (2025)

Nominated

- The Incredibles (2004)
- The Dark Knight (2008)
- Interstellar (2014)
- Oppenheimer (2023)
- The Wild Robot (2024)
