= Re-recording mixer =

Post-production audio engineer

A re-recording mixer in North America, also known as a dubbing mixer in Europe, is a post-production audio engineer who mixes recorded dialogue, sound effects and music to create the final version of a soundtrack for a feature film, television program, or television advertisement. The final mix must achieve a desired sonic balance between its various elements, and must match the director's or sound designer's original vision for the project. For material intended for broadcast, the final mix must also comply with all applicable laws governing sound mixing (e.g., the CALM Act in the United States and the EBU R 128 loudness protocol in Europe).

The different names of this profession are both based on the fact that the mixer is not mixing a live performance to a live audience nor recording live on a set. That is, the mixer is re-recording sound already recorded elsewhere (the basis of the North American name) after passing it through mixing equipment such as a digital audio workstation and may dub in additional sounds in the process (the basis of the European name). While mixing can be performed in a recording studio or home office, a full-size mixing stage or dubbing stage is used for feature films intended for release to movie theaters in order to help the mixer envision how the final mix will be heard in such large spaces.

During production or earlier parts of post-production, sound editors, sound designers, sound engineers, production sound mixers and/or music editors assemble the tracks that become raw materials for the re-recording mixer to work with. Those tracks in turn originate with sounds created by professional musicians, singers, actors, or Foley artists.

The first part of the traditional re-recording process is called the "premix." In the dialog premix the re-recording mixer does preliminary processing, including making initial loudness adjustments, cross-fading, and reducing environmental noise or spill that the on-set microphone picked up. In most instances, audio restoration software may be employed. For film or television productions, they may add a temporary/permanent music soundtrack that will have been prepared by the music editor, then the resulting work will be previewed by test audiences, and then the film or television program is re-cut and the soundtrack must be mixed again. Re-recording mixer may also augment or minimize audience reactions for television programs recorded in front of a studio audience. In some cases, a laugh track may augment these reactions.

During the "final mix" the re-recording/dubbing mixers, guided by the director or producer, must make creative decisions from moment to moment in each scene about how loud each major sound element (dialog, sound effects, laugh track and music) should be relative to each other. They also modify individual sounds when desired by adjusting their loudness and spectral content and by adding artificial reverberation. They can insert sounds into a three-dimensional space of the listening environment for a variety of venues and release formats: movie theaters, home theater systems, etc. that have stereo and multi-channel (5.1, 7.1, etc.) surround sound systems. Today, films may be mixed in 'object-based' audio formats such as Dolby Atmos, which adds height channels and metadata to allow for real-time rendering of audio objects in a three-dimensional coordinate space.
