= Cinema Audio Society Award for Outstanding Achievement in Sound Mixing for Television Movie or Limited Series =

Annual US television award

- Country: United States
- Presented by: Cinema Audio Society
- Currently held by: Richard Bullock, Chris Carpenter, Joseph DeAngelis – Mare of Easttown (2021)

The Cinema Audio Society Award for Outstanding Achievement in Sound Mixing for Television Movie or Limited Series is an annual award given by the Cinema Audio Society to live action motion picture sound mixer for their outstanding achievements in sound mixing. The award was first given in 1995, and has been awarded every year since; the only changes with the category have been to its title.

== Winners and nominees ==
=== 1990s ===
Outstanding Achievement in Sound Mixing for Television

| Year | Program | Episode(s) | Nominees | Network |
|---|---|---|---|---|
| 1993 (1st) | Star Trek: The Next Generation | "Descent, Parts 1 & 2" | Alan Bernard (production mixer); Chris Haire, Doug Davey, Richard L. Morrison (re-recording mixers) | Syndicated |
| 1993 (1st) | Lois & Clark: The New Adventures of Superman | "Pilot" | Kenn Fuller (production mixer); David E. Fluhr, John Asman, Melissa Sherwood Hofmann (re-recording mixers) | ABC |
| 1993 (1st) | NYPD Blue | "Pilot" | Mark Server (production mixer); Robert Appere, Kenneth R. Burton, Gary D. Rogers, Dan Hiland (re-recording mixera) | ABC |
| 1993 (1st) | Northern Exposure | "Kaddish for Uncle Manny" | Robert Marts (production mixer); R. Russell Smith, Greg Orloff, Anthony D'Amico (re-recording mixers) | CBS |
| 1993 (1st) | Return to Lonesome Dove | "The Vision" | Clark King, Donald F. Johnson (production mixers); Thomas J. Huth, Sam Black, David M. Weishaar (re-recording mixers) | CBS |

Outstanding Achievement in Sound Mixing for Television - Movie of the Week or Mini-Series

| Year | Program | Episode(s) | Nominees | Network |
|---|---|---|---|---|
| 1994 (2nd) | Young Indiana Jones and the Hollywood Follies | | Rolf Pardula (production mixer); Bob Edwards, Christopher Boyes, Gary Summers (re-recording mixers) | The Family Network |
| 1994 (2nd) | David's Mother | | Chaim Gilad (production mixer); David E. Fluhr, John Asman, Melissa Sherwood Hofmann (re-recording mixers) | CBS |
| 1994 (2nd) | Oldest Living Confederate Widow Tells All | "Part 1" | Steve C. Aaron (production mixer); Larry Stensvold, Gary Bolger, Don Digirolamo (re-recording mixers) | CBS |
| 1994 (2nd) | The Stand | "The Plague" | Richard Schexnayder, Don Summer (production mixers); Grant Maxwell, Michael Ruschak (re-recording mixers) | ABC |
| 1994 (2nd) | World War II: When Lions Roared | "Part II" | Sunny Meyer (production mixer); Thomas J. Huth, Sam Black, David M. Weishaar (re-recording mixers) | NBC |

Outstanding Achievement in Sound Mixing for Television - Movie of the Week, Mini-Series or Specials

| Year | Program | Episode(s) | Nominees | Network |
|---|---|---|---|---|
| 1995 (3rd) | The Piano Lesson | | Michael C. Moore (production mixer); David E. Fluhr, John Asman, Sam Black (re-recording mixers) | CBS |
| 1995 (3rd) | Kingfish: A Story of Huey P. Long | | Walter Hoylman (production mixer); Matthew Iadarola, Gary Gegan, Grover B. Helsley (re-recording mixers) | TNT |
| 1995 (3rd) | The Langoliers | "Episode 1" | Jay Meagher (production mixer), Grant Maxwell (re-recording mixer) | ABC |
| 1995 (3rd) | Redwood Curtain | | Nelson Stoll (production mixer); David E. Fluhr, John Asman, Sam Black (re-recording mixers) | ABC |
| 1995 (3rd) | Buffalo Girls | "Part 1" | David Brownlow (production mixer); Patrick Cyccone Jr., Edward F. Suski, James G. Williams (re-recording mixers) | CBS |
| 1996 (4th) | The Three Tenors at Giants Stadium | | David Hewitt (production mixer), Ken Hahn (re-recording mixer) | |
| 1996 (4th) | Alien Nation: The Enemy Within | | Edward L. Moskowitz (production mixer); David John West, Nello Torri, Doug E. Turner (re-recording mixers) | Fox |
| 1996 (4th) | Gulliver's Travels | "Part 1" | Simon Kaye (production mixer); Paul Hamblin, Clive Pendry (re-recording mixers) | NBC |
| 1996 (4th) | Harvest of Fire | | Richard I. Birnbaum (production mixer); David E. Fluhr, John Asman, Sam Black (re-recording mixers) | CBS |
| 1996 (4th) | In Cold Blood | "Part II" | Larry Sutton (production mixer); David E. Fluhr, Adam Jenkins, Don Digirolamo (re-recording mixers) | CBS |
| 1997 (5th) | Into Thin Air: Death on Everest | | Jay Patterson (production mixer); Wayne Artman, Robert L. Harman, Franklin Jones Jr. (re-recording mixer) | ABC |
| 1997 (5th) | Don King: Only in America | | Richard Lightstone (production mixer); Jeffrey Perkins, David J. Hudson (re-recording mixers) | HBO |
| 1997 (5th) | Miss Evers' Boys | | Shirley Libby (production mixer); Robert W. Glass Jr., Scott Ganary, Jim Fitzpatrick (re-recording mixers) | HBO |
| 1997 (5th) | Stomp Out Loud | | Lawrence Loewinger (production mixer); Ken Hahn, Mike Roberts (re-recording mixers) | HBO |
| 1997 (5th) | Buffalo Soldiers | | Tim Cooney (production mixer); Larry Stensvold, Pete Elia (re-recording mixers) | TNT |
| 1998 (6th) | From the Earth to the Moon | "Le Voyage Dans La Lune" | Joe Foglia (production mixer); Kevin Patrick Burns, Todd Orr (re-recording mixer) | HBO |
| 1998 (6th) | Mama Flora's Family | "Part II" | Mary H. Ellis (production mixer); Terry O'Bright, Keith Rogers (re-recording mixers) | CBS |
| 1998 (6th) | The Rat Pack | | Felipe Borrero (production mixer); Michael C. Casper, Daniel J. Leahy (re-recording mixers) | HBO |
| 1998 (6th) | Winchell | | Richard Van Dyke (production mixer); Dan Hiland, Gary D. Rogers (re-recording mixers) | HBO |
| 1998 (6th) | The Temptations | "Part 1" | Russell Williams II (production mixer); Richard D. Rogers, Rick Alexander, Rick Hart (re-recording mixers) | NBC |

Outstanding Achievement in Sound Mixing for Television - Movies of the Week and Mini-Series

| Year | Program | Episode(s) | Nominees | Network |
|---|---|---|---|---|
| 1999 (7th) | Joan of Arc | "Part I" | Urmas Rosin (production mixer); Lou Solakofski, Orest Sushko (re-recording mixer) | CBS |
| 1999 (7th) | The '60s | "Part II" | Kenn Fuller (production mixer); Gary Coppola, Craig M. Otte (re-recording mixers) | NBC |
| 1999 (7th) | The Hunley | | Steve C. Aaron (production mixer); Terry O'Bright, Keith Rogers (re-recording mixers) | TNT |
| 1999 (7th) | A Lesson Before Dying | | Shirley Libby (production mixer); Rick Ash, Rick Hart (re-recording mixers) | HBO |
| 1999 (7th) | Tuesdays with Morrie | | Richard Van Dyke (production mixer); Dan Hiland, Gary D. Rogers (re-recording mixers) | ABC |

=== 2000s ===
| Year | Program | Episode(s) | Nominees | Network |
|---|---|---|---|---|
| 2000 (8th) | The Beach Boys: An American Family | "Part 1" | Edward L. Moskowitz (production mixer); Richard Alexander, Richard D. Rogers, Rick Hart (re-recording mixers) | ABC |
| 2000 (8th) | The '70s | "Part I" | Gary Cunningham (production mixer); Peter Reale, Roberta Doheny (re-recording mixers) | NBC |
| 2000 (8th) | Dirty Pictures | | John J. Thomson (production mixer); Todd Orr, Kevin Patrick Burns, Tom Perry (re-recording mixers) | Showtime |
| 2000 (8th) | On the Beach | "Part II" | John McKerrow (production mixer), Robert Sullivan (re-recording mixer) | Showtime |
| 2000 (8th) | Dune | "Episode 1" | Michal Holubec (production mixer); Larry Stensvold, Pete Elia (re-recording mixers) | Sci Fi Channel |
| 2001 (9th) | Band of Brothers | "Day of Days" | David Stephenson (production mixer); Mike Dowson, Mark Taylor (re-recording mixers) | HBO |
| 2001 (9th) | Anne Frank: The Whole Story | "Part 1" | Michal Holubec (production mixer); Terry O'Bright, Tom E. Dahl (re-recording mixers) | ABC |
| 2001 (9th) | Jazz | "Gumbo: Beginnings to 1917" | Dominick Tavella (production mixer), Lee Dichter (re-recording mixer) | PBS |
| 2001 (9th) | 61* | | Jeff Wexler (production mixer); Matthew Iadarola, Gary Coppola (re-recording mixers) | HBO |
| 2001 (9th) | The Lost Battalion | | Ulf Herrmann (production mixer); Marshall Garlington, Ken Teaney (re-recording mixer) | A&E |
| 2001 (9th) | Uprising | | Mary H. Ellis (production mixer); Wayne Heitman, Brad Sherman (re-recording mixers) | NBC |
| 2002 (10th) | Shackleton | "Part I" | John Rodda (production mixer), Dave Humphries (re-recording mixer) | A&E |
| 2002 (10th) | The Gathering Storm | | David Stephenson (production mixer); John Hayward, Richard Pryke, Rick Ash (re-recording mixers) | HBO |
| 2002 (10th) | Live from Baghdad | | James M. Tanenbaum (production mixer); Rick Ash, Adam Jenkins, Drew Webster (re-recording mixers) | HBO |
| 2002 (10th) | Martin and Lewis | | John J. Thomson (production mixer); Terry O'Bright, Nello Torri, Peter Kelsey (re-recording mixers) | CBS |
| 2002 (10th) | Taken | "John" | Lars Ekstrom (production mixer); Chris Haire, Richard L. Morrison, Chris Elam (re-recording mixers) | Sci Fi Channel |

Outstanding Achievement in Sound Mixing for Television - Movies and Mini-Series

| Year | Program | Episode(s) | Nominees | Network |
|---|---|---|---|---|
| 2003 (11th) | Angels in America | "Perestroika" | James Sabat (production mixer); Lee Dichter, Ron Bochar (re-recording mixers) | HBO |
| 2003 (11th) | Hitler: The Rise of Evil | "Part II" | Reinhard Stergar (production mixer); Martin Lee, Ian Rankin (re-recording mixers) | CBS |
| 2003 (11th) | A Painted House | | Itzhak Magal (production mixer); Kevin Patrick Burns, Todd Orr (re-recording mixers) | CBS |
| 2003 (11th) | And Starring Pancho Villa as Himself | | Hank Garfield (production mixer); Rick Ash, Adam Jenkins, Drew Webster (re-recording mixers) | HBO |
| 2003 (11th) | My House in Umbria | | David Stephenson (production mixer); Robin O'Donoghue, Mike Dowson, Mark Taylor (re-recording mixers) | HBO |

Outstanding Achievement in Sound Mixing for Television Movies and Mini-Series

| Year | Program | Episode(s) | Nominees | Network |
|---|---|---|---|---|
| 2004 (12th) | The Life and Death of Peter Sellers | | Simon Kaye (production mixer); Rick Ash, Adam Jenkins (re-recording mixers) | HBO |
| 2004 (12th) | The Five People You Meet in Heaven | | R. Russell Smith (production mixer); Michael McGee, Bill Freesh (re-recording mixers) | ABC |
| 2004 (12th) | The Hollow | | Zsolt Magyar (production mixer); Jim Corbett, Mark Lanza (re-recording mixers) | ABC Family |
| 2004 (12th) | Something the Lord Made | | Bruce Litecky (production mixer); Rick Ash, Adam Jenkins (re-recording mixers) | HBO |
| 2004 (12th) | Ike: Countdown to D-Day | | Tony Johnson (production mixer); Wayne Heitman, Tim Philben, Alan Decker (re-recording mixers) | A&E |
| 2005 (13th) | Lackawanna Blues | | Susumu Tokunow (production mixer); Rick Ash, Adam Jenkins (re-recording mixers) | HBO |
| 2005 (13th) | Category 7: The End of the World | | Louis Marion (production mixer); Chris David, Adam Jenkins (re-recording mixers) | CBS |
| 2005 (13th) | Empire | "Pilot" | Brian Simmons (production mixer); Chris Haire, Chris Elam (re-recording mixers) | ABC |
| 2005 (13th) | Sleeper Cell | "Youmud Din" | Roger Pietschmann (production mixer); Elmo Ponsdomenech, Joe Earle (re-recording mixers) | Showtime |
| 2005 (13th) | Three Wise Guys | | Robert Seymour (production mixer); Robert Appere, Ed Carr (re-recording mixers) | ABC Family |
| 2006 (14th) | Flight 93 | | Mark Linden, Tara A. Paul, Liam Lockhart, Harry Snodgrass (re-recording mixers) | A&E |
| 2006 (14th) | Desperation | | Lisa Pinero (production mixer); Andre Perreault, Kenneth R. Burton (re-recording mixers) | ABC |
| 2006 (14th) | Walkout | | Stephen Halbert (production mixer); Sergio Reyes, Timothy J. Borquez, Kevin Patrick Burns (re-recording mixers) | HBO |
| 2006 (14th) | Jean-Michel Cousteau: Ocean Adventures | "Sharks at Risk" | Mike Westgate (production mixer), Paul James Zahnley (re-recording mixer) | PBS |
| 2006 (14th) | Sleeper Cell | "Fitna" | Steve Weiss (production mixer); Elmo Ponsdomenech, Joe Earle (re-recording mixers) | Showtime |
| 2007 (15th) | Bury My Heart at Wounded Knee | | George Tarrant, Rick Ash, Ed Carr (re-recording mixers) | HBO |
| 2007 (15th) | The Company | "Episode 2" | Mac Ruth (production mixer); Nello Torri, Alam Decker (re-recording mixers) | TNT |
| 2007 (15th) | High School Musical 2 | | Douglas Cameron (production mixer); Terry O'Bright, Keith Rogers (re-recording mixers) | Disney Channel |
| 2007 (15th) | The Kill Point | "The Great Ape Escape" | James Emswiller (production mixer); Robert Appere, Ethan Beigel (re-recording mixers) | Spike TV |
| 2007 (15th) | Tin Man | "Into the Storm" | Eric Lamontagne (production mixer); Iain Pattison, Paul A. Sharpe, Graeme Hughes (re-recording mixers) | Sci Fi |
| 2008 (16th) | John Adams | "Join or Die" | Jay Meagher (production mixer); Michael Minkler, Bob Beemer (re-recording mixers) | HBO |
| 2008 (16th) | Generation Kill | "A Burning Dog" | Danny Hambrook (production mixer); Stuart Hilliker, Alexandros Sidiropoulos (re-recording mixers) | HBO |
| 2008 (16th) | John Adams | "Don't Tread on Me" | Jay Meagher (production mixer); Marc Fishman, Tony Lamberti (re-recording mixers) | HBO |
| 2008 (16th) | John Adams | "Independence" | Jay Meagher (production mixer); Michael Minkler, Bob Beemer (re-recording mixers) | HBO |
| 2008 (16th) | Recount | | Gary Alper (production mixer); Gary C. Bourgeois, Greg Orloff (re-recording mixers) | HBO |
| 2009 (17th) | Grey Gardens | | Henry Embry (production mixer), Rick Ash (re-recording mixer) | HBO |
| 2009 (17th) | Endgame | | Chris Ashworth (production mixer); Mark Paterson, Jamie Roden (re-recording mixers) | PBS |
| 2009 (17th) | House | "Broken" | Von Varga (production mixer); Richard Weingart, Gerry Lentz (re-recording mixers) | Fox |
| 2009 (17th) | Into the Storm | | Martin Trevis (production mixer), Brendan Nicholson (re-recording mixer) | HBO |
| 2009 (17th) | Taking Chance | | T.J. O'Mara (production mixer), Rick Ash (re-recording mixer) | HBO |

=== 2010s ===
| Year | Program | Episode(s) | Nominees | Network |
|---|---|---|---|---|
| 2010 (18th) | Temple Grandin | | Ethan Andrus (production mixer), Rick Ash (re-recording mixer) | HBO |
| 2010 (18th) | The Pacific | "Basilone" | Andrew Ramage (production mixer); Michael Minkler, Daniel J. Leahy (re-recording mixers) | HBO |
| 2010 (18th) | The Pacific | "Iwo Jima" | Gary Wilkins (production mixer); Michael Minkler, Daniel J. Leahy, Marc Fishman (re-recording mixers) | HBO |
| 2010 (18th) | The Pacific | "Okinawa" | Gary Wilkins (production mixer); Michael Minkler, Daniel J. Leahy (re-recording mixers) | HBO |
| 2010 (18th) | The Pacific | "Peleliu Landing" | Andrew Ramage (production mixer); Michael Minkler, Daniel J. Leahy, Craig Mann (re-recording mixers) | HBO |
| 2011 (19th) | Too Big to Fail | | James Sabat (production mixer); Chris Jenkins, Bob Beemer (re-recording mixers); Chris Fogel (scoring mixer) | HBO |
| 2011 (19th) | Innocent | | Shane Connelly (production mixer); Mark Hensley, Tamara Johnson (re-recording mixers); Tom Brissette (scoring mixer) | TNT |
| 2011 (19th) | The Kennedys | "Lancer and Lace" | Henry Embry (production mixer); Frank Morrone, Stephen Traub (re-recording mixers); Larold Rebhun (scoring mixer) | Reelz |
| 2011 (19th) | Cinema Verite | | Petur Hliddal (production mixer); Lora Hirschberg, Scott R. Lewis, Douglas Murray (re-recording mixers); Greg Townley (scoring mixer) | HBO |
| 2011 (19th) | Mildred Pierce | "Part Five" | Drew Kunin (production mixer), Leslie Shatz (re-recording mixer), Todd Whitelock (scoring mixer) | HBO |
| 2012 (20th) | Hatfields & McCoys | "Part 1" | Dragos Stanomir (production mixer); Christian Cooke, Brad Zoern (re-recording mixers); Jeff Vaughn (scoring mixer); Eric Apps (adr mixer); Peter Persaud (foley mixer) | History |
| 2012 (20th) | American Horror Story: Asylum | "Welcome to Briarcliff" | Sean Rush (production mixer); Joe Earle, Doug Andham (re-recording mixers); James S. Levine (scoring mixer); Judah Getz (adr mixer); Kyle Billingsley (foley mixer) | FX |
| 2012 (20th) | Game Change | | David MacMillan (production mixer); Gabriel J. Serrano, Leslie Shatz (re-recording mixers); Chris Fogel (scoring mixer); Travis MacKay (adr mixer); Tor McAfee Kingdon (foley mixer) | HBO |
| 2012 (20th) | Hemingway & Gellhorn | | Nelson Stoll (production mixer); Lora Hirschberg, Pete Horner, Douglas Murray (re-recording mixers); Marc Blanes Matas (scoring mixer); Andy Greenberg (adr mixer); Don White (foley mixer) | HBO |
| 2012 (20th) | Sherlock | "A Scandal in Belgravia" | John Mooney (production mixer), Howard Bargroff (re-recording mixer), Nick Wollage (scoring mixer), Paul McFadden (adr mixer), Will Everett (foley mixer) | PBS |
| 2013 (21st) | Behind the Candelabra | | Dennis Towns (production mixer), Larry Blake (re-recording mixer), Thomas Vicari (scoring mixer), Scott Curtis (foley mixer) | HBO |
| 2013 (21st) | American Horror Story: Coven | "The Replacements" | Bruce Litecky (production mixer); Joe Earle, Doug Andham (re-recording mixers); James S. Levine (scoring mixer); Judah Getz (adr mixer); Kyle Billingsley (foley mixer) | FX |
| 2013 (21st) | Battlestar Galactica: Blood & Chrome | | Rick Bal (production mixer); John W. Cook II, Peter Nusbaum (re-recording mixers) | Syfy |
| 2013 (21st) | Bonnie & Clyde | "Part 2" | Erik H. Magnus (production mixer); R. Russell Smith, Robert Edmondson (re-recording mixers); Shawn Murphy (scoring mixer); David Weisberg (adr mixer); Jeff Gross (foley mixer) | History |
| 2013 (21st) | Phil Spector | | Gary Alper (production mixer); Michael Barry, Roy Waldspurger (re-recording mixers); Chris Fogel (scoring mixer); Michael Miller (adr mixer); Don White (foley mixer) | HBO |
| 2014 (22nd) | Sherlock | "His Last Vow" | John Mooney (production mixer), Howard Bargroff (re-recording mixer), Nick Wollage (scoring mixer), Peter Gleaves (adr mixer), Will Everett (foley mixer) | PBS |
| 2014 (22nd) | American Horror Story: Freak Show | "Monsters Among Us" | Sean Rush (production mixer); Joe Earle, Doug Andham (re-recording mixers); Evan Daum (adr mixer); Kyle Billingsley (foley mixer) | FX |
| 2014 (22nd) | Fargo | "The Rooster Prince" | Michael Playfair (production mixer); David Raines, Mark Server (re-recording mixers); Andrew Morgado (adr mixer) | FX |
| 2014 (22nd) | Houdini | "Part 1" | Tamás Csaba (production mixer); Onnalee Blank, Ken Burton (re-recording mixers); Chris Navarro (adr mixer) | History |
| 2014 (22nd) | The Normal Heart | | Drew Kunin (production mixer); Joe Earle, Doug Andham (re-recording mixers); Beauxregard Neylen (adr mixer); Scott Curtis (foley mixer) | HBO |
| 2015 (23rd) | Fargo | "The Gift of the Magi" | Michael Playfair (production mixer); Kirk Lynds, Martin Lee (re-recording mixers) | FX |
| 2015 (23rd) | American Crime | "Episode One" | Benjamin Lowry (production mixer); Rick Norman, Ryan Davis (re-recording mixers) | ABC |
| 2015 (23rd) | American Horror Story: Hotel | "Checking In" | Brendan Beebe (production mixer); Joe Earle, Doug Andham (re-recording mixers); Judah Getz (adr mixer); John Guentner (foley mixer) | FX |
| 2015 (23rd) | American Horror Story: Hotel | "Room Service" | Brendan Beebe (production mixer); Joe Earle, Vicki Lemar (re-recording mixers) | FX |
| 2015 (23rd) | True Detective | "Down Will Come" | Geoffrey Patterson (production mixer); Steve Pederson, Daniel J. Leahy (re-recording mixers); Ron Bedrosian (adr mixer); Shawn Kennelly (foley mixer) | HBO |
| 2016 (24th) | The People v. O. J. Simpson: American Crime Story | | John Bauman (production mixers); Joe Earle, Doug Andham (re-recording mixers); Judah Getz (adr mixer); John Guentner (foley mixer) | FX |
| 2016 (24th) | 11.22.63 | "The Rabbit Hole" | John J. Thomson (production mixer); Pete Elia, Kevin Roache (re-recording mixers); Judah Getz (adr mixer); Brett Voss (foley mixer) | Hulu |
| 2016 (24th) | Black Mirror | "San Junipero" | https://cinemaaudiosociety.org/53rd-cas-awards-nominees/[[Adrian Bell (production mixer)]], Martin Jensen (re-recording mixer), Philip Clements (adr mixer), Rory de Carteret (foley mixer) | Netflix |
| 2016 (24th) | The Night Manager | "Episode 1" | Aitor Berenguer (production mixer); Howard Bargroff (re-recording mixer) | AMC |
| 2016 (24th) | Sherlock | "The Abominable Bride" | John Mooney (production mixer), Howard Bargroff (re-recording mixer), Nick Wollage (scoring mixer), Paul McFadden (adr mixer), Jamie Talbutt (foley mixer) | PBS |
| 2017 (25th) | Black Mirror | "USS Callister" | John Rodda (production mixer); Tim Cavagin, Dafydd Archard, William Miller (re-recording mixers); Nick Baldock (adr mixer); Sophia Hardman (foley mixer) | Netflix |
| 2017 (25th) | Big Little Lies | "You Get What You Need" | Brendan Beebe (production mixer); Gavin Fernandes, Louis Gignac (re-recording mixers) | HBO |
| 2017 (25th) | Fargo | "The Narrow Escape Problem" | Michael Playfair (production mixer); Kirk Lynds, Martin Lee (re-recording mixers); Michael Perfitt (scoring mixer) | FX |
| 2017 (25th) | Sherlock | "The Lying Detective" | John Mooney (production mixer), Howard Bargroff (re-recording mixer), Nick Wollage (scoring mixer), Paul McFadden (adr mixer), Jamie Talbutt (foley mixer) | PBS |
| 2017 (25th) | Twin Peaks | "Part 8" | Douglas Axtell (production mixer); Dean Hurley, Ronald Eng (re-recording mixers) | Showtime |

Outstanding Achievement in Sound Mixing for Television Movie or Limited Series

| Year | Program | Episode(s) | Nominees | Network |
|---|---|---|---|---|
| 2018 (26th) | The Assassination of Gianni Versace: American Crime Story | "The Man Who Would Be Vogue" | John Bauman (production mixer); Joe Earle, Doug Andham (re-recording mixers); Judah Getz (adr mixer); Arno Stephanian (foley mixer) | FX |
| 2018 (26th) | Escape at Dannemora | "Part 1" | Tom Nelson (production mixer); Bob Chefalas, Jacob Ribicoff (re-recording mixers); John W. Chapman (scoring mixer); Krissopher Chevannes (adr mixer); George A. Lara (foley mixer) | Showtime |
| 2018 (26th) | Fahrenheit 451 | | Henry Embry (production mixer); Tom Fleischman, Jacob Ribicoff (re-recording mixers); Mark DeSimone (adr mixer); George A. Lara (foley mixer) | HBO |
| 2018 (26th) | Genius: Picasso | "Chapter One" | Tamás Csaba (production mixer); Bob Bronow, Mark Hensley (re-recording mixers); Beau Emory, Matt Hovland (adr mixers); David Torres (foley mixer) | Nat Geo |
| 2018 (26th) | The Romanoffs | "House of Special Purpose" | Petr Forejt (production mixer); Larry Benjamin, Kevin Valentine (re-recording mixers); Chris Navarro (adr mixer); Terry Boyd Jr. (foley mixer) | Amazon |
| 2019 (27th) | Chernobyl | "1:23:45" | Vincent Piponnier (production mixer), Stuart Hilliker (re-recording mixer), Gibran Farrah (adr mixer), Philip Clements (foley mixer) | HBO |
| 2019 (27th) | Apollo: Missions to the Moon | | John Warrin (re-recording mixer), John W. Chapman (scoring mixer) | Nat Geo |
| 2019 (27th) | El Camino: A Breaking Bad Movie | | Phillip W. Palmer (production mixer); Larry Benjamin, Kevin Valentine (re-recording mixers); Greg Hayes (scoring mixer); Chris Navarro (adr mixer); Stacey Michaels (foley mixer) | Netflix |
| 2019 (27th) | Deadwood: The Movie | | Geoffrey Patterson (production mixer); John W. Cook II, William Freesh (re-recording mixers) | HBO |
| 2019 (27th) | True Detective | "The Great War and Modern Memory" | Geoffrey Patterson (production mixer); Tateum Kohut, Greg Orloff (re-recording mixers); Biff Dawes (scoring mixer); Chris Navarro (adr mixer); Nerses Gezalyan (foley mixer) | HBO |

=== 2020s ===
| Year | Program | Episode(s) | Nominees | Network |
|---|---|---|---|---|
| 2020 (28th) | The Queen's Gambit | "Middle Game" | Roland Winke (production mixer); Eric Hirsch, Eric Hoehn, Leo Marcil (re-recording mixers); Lawrence Manchester (scoring mixer) | Netflix |
| 2020 (28th) | American Horror Story: 1984 | "Final Girl" | Alex Altman (production mixer); Doug Andham, Joe Earle (re-recording mixers); Judah Getz (adr mixer); Jacob McNaughton (foley mixer) | FX |
| 2020 (28th) | Fargo | "East/West" | J.T. Mueller (production mixer); Josh Eckberg, Jeffrey Perkins (re-recording mixers); Michael Perfitt (scoring mixer); Matt Hovland (adr mixer); Randy Wilson (foley mixer) | FX |
| 2020 (28th) | Lovecraft Country | "Sundown" | Amanda Beggs (production mixer); Marc Fishman, Mathew Waters (re-recording mixers); Brad Hacknell (scoring mixer); Miguel Araujo (adr mixer), Brett Voss (foley mixer) | HBO |
| 2020 (28th) | Watchmen | "This Extraordinary Being" | Doug Axtell (production mixer); Chris Carpenter, Joseph DeAngelis (re-recording mixers); Atticus Ross (scoring mixer); Judah Getz (adr mixer); Antony Zeller (foley mixer) | HBO |
| 2021 (29th) | Mare of Easttown | "Sore Must Be the Storm" | Richard Bullock (production mixer); Chris Carpenter, Joseph DeAngelis (re-recording mixers) | HBO |
| 2021 (29th) | Hawkeye | "Echoes" | Pud Cusack (production mixer); Danielle Dupre, Tom Myers (re-recording mixers); Casey Stone (scoring mixer); Doc Kane (adr mixer); Kevin Schultz (adr mixer) | Disney+ |
| 2021 (29th) | The Underground Railroad | "Chapter 10: Mabel" | Joseph White Jr. (production mixer); Onnalee Blank, Mathew Waters (re-recording mixers); Geoff Foster (scoring mixer); Kari Vahakuopus (foley mixer) | Amazon |
| 2021 (29th) | WandaVision | "Previously On" | Christopher Giles (production mixer), Danielle Dupre (re-recording mixer), Casey Stone (scoring mixer), Doc Kane (adr mixer), Frank Rinella (foley mixer) | Disney+ |
| 2021 (29th) | WandaVision | "The Series Finale" | Christopher Giles, Michael Piotrowski (production mixers); Danielle Dupre (re-recording mixer); Casey Stone (scoring mixer); Doc Kane (adr mixer); Malcolm Fife (foley mixer) | Disney+ |
| 2022 (30th) | Obi-Wan Kenobi | "Part I" | Julian Howarth (production mixer); Bonnie Wild, Danielle Dupre, Scott R. Lewis (re-recording mixers); (scoring mixer); Doc Kane (adr mixer); Jason Butler (foley mixer) | Disney+ |
| 2022 (30th) | Dahmer – Monster: The Jeffrey Dahmer Story | "Lionel" | Amanda Beggs (production mixer); Laura Wiest, Joe Barnett, Jamie Hardt (re-recording mixers); Judah Getz (adr mixer); Jacob McNaughton (foley mixer) | Netflix |
| 2022 (30th) | Guillermo del Toro's Cabinet of Curiosities | "The Autopsy" | Rob Beal (production mixer); Paul Shubat, Michael Woroniuk (re-recording mixers) | Netflix |
| 2022 (30th) | Moon Knight | "Gods and Monsters" | Tamás Csaba (production mixer); Bonnie Wild, Scott R. Lewis (re-recording mixers); Scott Michael Smith (scoring mixer); Doc Kane (adr mixer); Jack Cucci (foley mixer) | Disney+ |
| 2022 (30th) | Prey | | Ron Osiowy (production mixer); Craig Henighan, Chris Terhune, Joel Dougherty (re-recording mixer); Frank Wolf (scoring mixer); Jamison Rabbe (adr mixer); Connor Nagy (foley mixer) | Hulu |
| 2023 (31st) | All the Light We Cannot See | "Episode 4" | Balazs Varga (production mixer); Mark Paterson, Craig Henighan (re-recording mixers); Nick Wollage (scoring mixer); Bobby Johanson (adr mixer); Peter Persaud (foley mixer) | Netflix |
| 2023 (31st) | Beef | "The Great Fabricator" | Sean O'Malley (production mixer); Penny Harold, Andrew Garrett Lange (re-recording mixers); Andrey Starikovskiy (foley mixer) | Netflix |
| 2023 (31st) | Black Mirror | "Beyond the Sea" | Richard Miller (production mixer), James Ridgway (re-recording mixer), Daniel Kresco (scoring mixer), James Hyde (adr mixer), Adam Mendez (foley mixer) | Netflix |
| 2023 (31st) | Daisy Jones & the Six | "Track 10: Rock n' Roll Suicide" | Chris Welcker (production mixer); Lindsey Alvarez, Mathew Waters (re-recording mixers); Mike Poole (scoring mixer); Chris Navarro (adr mixer); James B. Howe (foley mixer) | Prime Video |
| 2023 (31st) | Weird: The Al Yankovic Story | | Richard Bullock (production mixer), Tony Solis (re-recording mixer), Phil McGowan (scoring mixer), Brian Magrum (adr mixer), Erika Koski (foley mixer) | The Roku Channel |

== See also ==
- Primetime Emmy Award for Outstanding Sound Mixing for a Limited or Anthology Series or Movie
