= Primetime Emmy Award for Outstanding Sound Mixing for a Limited or Anthology Series or Movie =

Television award category

Primetime Emmy Award for Sound Mixing for a Limited or Anthology Series or Movie
- Awarded for: Outstanding Sound Mixing for a Limited or Anthology Series or Movie
- Country: United States
- Presented by: Academy of Television Arts & Sciences
- Currently held by: The Penguin (2025)
- Website: emmys.com

The Primetime Emmy Award for Outstanding Sound Mixing for a Limited or Anthology Series or Movie is an award handed out annually at the Creative Arts Emmy Award. Limited series and television movies shot on videotape competed alongside variety series and specials for Outstanding Tape Sound Mixing before 1986. They also faced off against regular series for Outstanding Achievement in Film Sound Mixing before 1983.

In the following list, the first titles listed in gold are the winners; those not in gold are nominees, which are listed in alphabetical order. The years given are those in which the ceremonies took place:

== Winners and nominations ==
=== 1970s ===
Outstanding Achievement in Film Sound Mixing

Year	Program	Episode	Nominees	Network
1970 (22nd)
1970 (22nd)	Mission: Impossible		Gordon L. Day, Dominick Gaffey	CBS
1970 (22nd)	First Tuesday		Roger Gary Andrews	NBC
1970 (22nd)	My Sweet Charlie		Roger Heman, Melvin M. Metcalfe, Clarence Self, John Stransky Jr.	NBC
1971 (23rd)
1971 (23rd)	Tribes		Theodore Soderberg	ABC
1971 (23rd)	Mannix		Joel Moss, Don Rush	CBS
1971 (23rd)	San Francisco International Airport		Robert L. Hoyt, Roger Parish	NBC
1971 (23rd)	Vanished		James Z. Flaster, Ronald K. Pierce	NBC
1972 (24th)
1972 (24th)	Fireball Forward		Richard Overton, Theodore Soderberg	ABC
1972 (24th)	Brian's Song		William J. Montague, Alfred E. Overton	ABC
1972 (24th)	The Undersea World of Jacques Cousteau		Roy Granville, Eddie J. Nelson, George E. Porter	ABC
1973 (25th)
1973 (25th)	Surrender at Appomattox: Appointment with Destiny		Fred Leroy Granville, Eddie J. Nelson, George E. Porter, Richard J. Wagner	CBS
1973 (25th)	That Certain Summer		Melvin M. Metcalfe, Thom K. Piper	ABC
1973 (25th)	The Undersea World of Jacques Cousteau		Hoppy Mehterian, Eddie J. Nelson, George E. Porter	ABC

Outstanding Achievement in Film or Tape Sound Mixing

Year	Program	Episode	Nominees	Network
1974 (26th)
1974 (26th)	Pueblo		Albert A. Gramaglia, Michael Shindler	ABC
1974 (26th)	The Autobiography of Miss Jane Pittman		Charles T. Knight, Don Minkler	CBS
1974 (26th)	The Execution of Private Slovik		John Kean, Thom K. Piper	ABC
1975 (27th)
1975 (27th)	The American Film Institute Salute to James Cagney		Marshall King	CBS
1975 (27th)	The Missiles of October		Doug Nelson	ABC
1975 (27th)	Wide World in Concert		Doug Nelson, Norm Schwartz	ABC

Outstanding Achievement in Film Sound Mixing

Year	Program	Episode	Nominees	Network
1976 (28th)
1976 (28th)	Eleanor and Franklin		Don Bassman, Don Johnson	ABC
1976 (28th)	Sanburg's Lincoln		Robert L. Harman, Charles Lewis, Eddie J. Nelson, George E. Porter	NBC
1977 (29th)	Outstanding Achievement in Film Sound Mixing			
1977 (29th)	The Savage Bees		Alan Bernard, Robert L. Harman, Eddie J. Nelson, George E. Porter	NBC
1977 (29th)	Eleanor and Franklin: The White House Years		Donald W. MacDougall, Richard Portman, David Ronne, Curly Thirlwell	ABC
1977 (29th)	Roots	"Part 1"	Willie D. Burton, Robert Litt, Leonard Peterson, Bill Varney	ABC
1977 (29th)	Roots	"Part 4"	Willie D. Burton, George Porter, Eddie Nelson, Robert L. Harman	ABC
1977 (29th)	Roots	"Part 7"	Hoppy Mehterian, George Porter, Eddie Nelson, Arnold Braun	ABC
1977 (29th)	Roots	"Part 8"	George Porter, Eddie Nelson, Robert L. Harman, Arnold Braun	ABC
1977 (29th)	Outstanding Individual Achievement in Any Area of Creative Technical Crafts (Note: As a juried award, nominees had to garner 50% approval to win the award. The nominees did not meet the benchmark and no award was given.)			
1977 (29th)	Victory at Entebbe		Robert A. Biggart, Patrick Somerset	ABC
1978 (30th)
1978 (30th)	Young Joe, the Forgotten Kennedy		Robert L. Harman, Eddie J. Nelson, George E. Porter, William Teague	ABC
1978 (30th)	Having Babies II		Alan Bernard, Hoppy Mehterian, Eddie J. Nelson, George E. Porter	ABC
1978 (30th)	In the Matter of Karen Ann Quinlan		Hoppy Mehterian, Eddie J. Nelson, George E. Porter, Tommy Thompson	NBC
1978 (30th)	See How She Runs		Eddie J. Nelson, J. Robert Pettis, George E. Porter, Cabell Smith	CBS
1978 (30th)	A Sensitive, Passionate Man		Dean Hodges, Hoppy Mehterian, Eddie J. Nelson, George E. Porter	NBC
1978 (30th)	Tarantulas: The Deadly Cargo		Eddie Knowles, Eddie J. Nelson, J. Robert Pettis, George E. Porter	CBS
1979 (31st)
1979 (31st)	The Winds of Kitty Hawk		Eddie J. Nelson, George E. Porter, Bill Teague, Ray West	NBC
1979 (31st)	A Christmas to Remember		Stanley P. Gordon, Hoppy Mehterian, Eddie J. Nelson, George E. Porter	CBS
1979 (31st)	Ike	"Part 2"	Hoppy Mehterian, Eddie J. Nelson, George E. Porter, Bill Teague	ABC
1979 (31st)	The Triangle Factory Fire Scandal		Maury Harris, Eddie J. Nelson, George E. Porter, Ray West	NBC

=== 1980s ===
Year	Program	Episode	Nominees	Network
1980 (32nd)
1980 (32nd)	The Ordeal of Dr. Mudd		Ray Barons, David Campbell, Bob Pettis, John Reitz	CBS
1980 (32nd)	Amber Waves		Christopher Large, Eddie Nelson, George E. Porter, Terry Porter	ABC
1980 (32nd)	The Golden Moment: An Olympic Love Story		Robert Glass, Patrick Mitchell, Robert Thirwell, John Wilkenson	NBC
1980 (32nd)	Guyana Tragedy: The Story of Jim Jones		David Campbell, Jacque Nosco, Bob Pettis, John Reitz	CBS
1980 (32nd)	Skag	"Pilot"	David E. Dockendorf, Robert L. Harman, William L. McCaughey, Jack Solomon	NBC
1981 (33rd)
1981 (33rd)	Evita Peron	"Part 1"	Robert L. Harman, William L. McCaughey, William R. Teague, Howard Wollman	NBC
1981 (33rd)	Baby Comes Home		Alan Bernard, Robert L. Harman, William L. McCaughey, Howard Wollman	CBS
1981 (33rd)	The Bunker		Robert L. Harman, Rene Magnol, William L. McCaughey, Howard Wollman	CBS
1981 (33rd)	Dial "M" for Murder		Stanley P. Gordon, Robert L. Harman, William L. McCaughey, Lee Minkler	NBC
1981 (33rd)	Hart to Hart	"'Tis the Season to Be Murdered"	Robert L. Harman, William L. McCaughey, Blake Wilcox, Howard Wollman	ABC
1981 (33rd)	The Killing of Randy Webster		Robert L. Harman, William L. McCaughey, Richard Raguse, Howard Wollman	CBS
1981 (33rd)	Nero Wolfe	"Gambit"	Gary Bourgeois, Nick Gaffey, Lee Minkler, Terry Porter	NBC
1981 (33rd)	A Rumor of War		Harry Alphin, Manuel Topete Blake, Robert L. Harman, William L. McCaughey	CBS
1981 (33rd)	A Time for Miracles		Joel Fein, George E. Porter, William R. Teague, Howard Wollman	ABC
1981 (33rd)	Word of Honor		Robert L. Harman, John MacLeod, William L. McCaughey, Terry Porter	CBS
1982 (34th)
1982 (34th)	Hill Street Blues	"Personal Foul"	Bill Marky, Robert W. Glass Jr., Bill Nicholson, Howard Wilmarth	NBC
1982 (34th)	Fire on the Mountain		Thomas Causey, David J. Hudson, Mel Metcalfe, Ray West	NBC
1982 (34th)	Hill Street Blues	"The Second Oldest Profession"	Bill Marky, Don Cahn, Jim Cook, Robert L. Harman	NBC
1982 (34th)	A Woman Called Golda		Eli Yarkoni, Don Cahn, Jim Cook, Robert L. Harman	Syndicated
1982 (34th)	World War III		Jacques Nosco, Don Cahn, Jim Cook, Robert L. Harman	NBC

Outstanding Sound Mixing for a Limited Series or Movie

Year	Program	Episode	Nominees	Network
1983 (35th)
1983 (35th)	The Scarlet and the Black		John W. Mitchell, Gordon L. Day, Stan Wetzel, Howard Wilmarth	CBS
1983 (35th)	The Executioner's Song		Robert W. Glass Jr., David J. Hudson, Ray West, Steve Marlowe	NBC
1983 (35th)	The Winds of War	"Cataclysm"	Robin Gregory, Robert W. Glass Jr., William L. McCaughey, Allen L. Stone	ABC
1983 (35th)	The Winds of War	"Defiance"	Alan Bernard, Robert W. Glass Jr., William L. McCaughey, Mel Metcalfe	ABC
1983 (35th)	The Winds of War	"Into the Maelstrom"	Robin Gregory, Robert W. Glass Jr., Mel Metcalfe, William L. McCaughey	ABC
1984 (36th)
1984 (36th)	A Streetcar Named Desire		Richard Raguse, William L. McCaughey, Mel Metcalfe, Terry Porter	ABC
1984 (36th)	The Day After		Charles T. Knight, Gary C. Bourgeois, Kevin F. Cleary, Robert L. Harman	ABC
1984 (36th)	The Dollmaker		Scott D. Smith, Chris Carpenter, Gordon L. Day, Stan Wetzel	ABC
1984 (36th)	Flight 90: Disaster on the Potomac		William Randall, Mel Metcalfe, Don Minkler, Bill Thiederman	NBC
1984 (36th)	Kenny Rogers as The Gambler: The Adventure Continues		Keith A. Wester, Gordon L. Day, Stan Wetzel, Howard Wilmarth	CBS
1985 (37th)
1985 (37th)	Space	"Part 5"	Clark King, David J. Hudson, Mel Metcalfe, Terry Porter	CBS
1985 (37th)	Ellis Island	"Part 1"	Tony Dawe, Dick Alexander, Gordon L. Day, Howard Wilmarth	CBS
1985 (37th)	The Jesse Owens Story		Alan Bernard, Terry Porter, Mel Metcalfe, B. Tennyson Sebastian III	OPT
1985 (37th)	Malice in Wonderland		Keith A. Wester, Dick Alexander, Gordon L. Day, Howard Wilmarth	CBS
1985 (37th)	Wallenberg: A Hero's Story		Robin Gregory, David J. Hudson, Mel Metcalfe, Terry Porter	NBC
1986 (38th)
1986 (38th)	An Early Frost		David E. Campbell, John T. Reitz, Gregg Rudloff, Keith A. Wester	NBC
1986 (38th)	Death of a Salesman		Tom Fleischman	CBS
1986 (38th)	Ewoks: The Battle for Endor		Tom Johnson, Randy Thom	ABC
1986 (38th)	Mussolini: The Untold Story	"Part 1"	Thomas J. Huth, Tim Philben, George Stephenson, Howard Wilmarth	NBC
1987 (39th)
1987 (39th)	Unnatural Causes		Joseph D. Citarella, Charles Grenzbach, David Lee, Ray West	NBC
1987 (39th)	Amerika	"Part 3"	Grover B. Helsley, Richard D. Rogers, Keith A. Wester, John Wilkinson	ABC
1987 (39th)	LBJ: The Early Years		Joseph D. Citarella, Grover B. Helsley, Don Summer, Ray West	NBC
1987 (39th)	Out on a Limb	"Part 1"	Joseph D. Citarella, Grover B. Helsley, John Speak, Ray West	ABC
1987 (39th)	The Two Mrs. Grenvilles	"Part 1"	John Asman, Neil Brody, Ken S. Polk, Peter Sutton	NBC
1988 (40th)
1988 (40th)	Terrorist on Trial: The United States vs. Salim Ajami		Don MacDougall, Grover B. Helsley, Joseph D. Citarella, Russell Williams II	CBS
1988 (40th)	Bluffing It		Ray West, John L. Anderson, Joseph D. Citarella, Owen Langevin	ABC
1988 (40th)	Earth Star Voyager	"Part 1"	Ray West, Don MacDougall, Joseph D. Citarella, Eric Batut	ABC
1988 (40th)	Foxfire		Hank Garfield, Bill Nicholson, William Gazecki, Peter Reale	CBS
1988 (40th)	Right to Die		Ray West, Joseph D. Citarella, Charles Grenzbach, Walter Hoylman	NBC
1989 (41st)
1989 (41st)	Lonesome Dove	"The Return"	Donald F. Johnson, James L. Aicholtz, Michael Herbick, Kevin O'Connell	CBS
1989 (41st)	The Great Escape II: The Untold Story	"Part 1"	John Wilkinson, Richard D. Rogers, Grover B. Helsley, Claude Hitchcock	NBC
1989 (41st)	Guts and Glory: The Rise and Fall of Oliver North	"Part 1"	William L. McCaughey, Richard D. Rogers, Grover B. Helsley, Chuck Lewis	CBS
1989 (41st)	The Hijacking of the Achille Lauro		William L. McCaughey, Doug E. Turner, Grover B. Helsley, Noel Quinn	NBC
1989 (41st)	The Karen Carpenter Story		William L. McCaughey, Richard D. Rogers, Grover B. Helsley, Charles T. Knight	CBS
1989 (41st)	Margaret Bourke-White		John Wilkinson, Richard D. Rogers, Grover B. Helsley, Richard Schexnayder	TNT

=== 1990s ===
Year	Program	Episode	Nominees	Network
1990 (42nd)
1990 (42nd)	Cross of Fire	"Part 1"	Fred Schultz, William L. McCaughey, Richard D. Rogers, Grover B. Helsley	NBC
1990 (42nd)	Caroline?		Jim Hawkins, Grover B. Helsley, Doug E. Turner, John Wilkinson	CBS
1990 (42nd)	Challenger		Jacob Goldstein, Tim Philben, Clark Conrad, Scott Millan	ABC
1990 (42nd)	The Kennedys of Massachusetts	"Part 1"	Robert Wald, Scott Millan, Clark Conrad, Tim Philben	ABC
1990 (42nd)	The Old Man and the Sea		Peter Sutton, Thomas J. Huth, Anthony Constantini, Sam Black	NBC
1991 (43rd)
1991 (43rd)	Son of the Morning Star	"Part 2"	Thomas J. Huth, Anthony Constantini, Sam Black, Trevor Black	ABC
1991 (43rd)	Ironclads		Kenneth B. Ross, Tim Philben, Scott Millan, George R. Groves Jr.	TNT
1991 (43rd)	The Josephine Baker Story		János Réti, Hugh Strain, Clive Pendry	HBO
1991 (43rd)	Sarah, Plain and Tall		Jacob Goldstein, Grover B. Helsley, Robert W. Glass Jr., Richard D. Rogers	CBS
1991 (43rd)	Separate But Equal	"Part 1"	Ed Novick, Gary Alexander, Adam Jenkins, Dennis Kirk	ABC
1992 (44th)
1992 (44th)	One Against the Wind		Thomas J. Huth, Anthony Constantini, Sam Black, Trevor Black	CBS
1992 (44th)	Crash Landing: The Rescue of Flight 232		Kenneth B. Ross, Troy Porter, George R. Groves Jr., David E. Fluhr	ABC
1992 (44th)	A Woman Named Jackie	"Part 3"	Walter Hoylman, Jerry Clemans, Robert L. Harman, Allen L. Stone	NBC
1993 (45th)
1993 (45th)	Stalin		Drew Kunin, Grover B. Helsley, Robert W. Glass Jr., Richard D. Rogers, Michael Jiron, Tim Philben, Scott Millan	HBO
1993 (45th)	Alex Haley's Queen	"Part 3"	Robert J. Anderson Jr., John Asman, George R. Groves Jr., David E. Fluhr	CBS
1993 (45th)	Barbarians at the Gate		Jacob Goldstein, Ken S. Polk, Tim Philben, James A. Williams	HBO
1993 (45th)	Citizen Cohn		John Pritchett, Dan Wallin, Anna Behlmer, Richard Portman	HBO
1993 (45th)	The Jacksons: An American Dream	"Part 2"	Claude Riggins, Daniel J. Leahy, Michael C. Casper, Gary Lux	ABC
1993 (45th)	Sinatra	"Part 1"	Maury Harris, Wayne Artman, Robert Fernandez, Tom E. Dahl	CBS
1994 (46th)
1994 (46th)	Stephen King's The Stand		Grant Maxwell, Michael Ruschak, Richard Schexnayder, Don Summer	ABC
1994 (46th)	Geronimo		Don Sanders, Gary Montgomery, Jim Fitzpatrick, Bruce P. Michaels	TNT
1994 (46th)	Gypsy		Larry Stensvold, Robert Schaper, Garrie Bolger, David M. Ronne	CBS
1994 (46th)	Oldest Living Confederate Widow Tells All		Larry Stensvold, Garrie Bolger, Don Digirolamo	CBS
1994 (46th)	To Dance with the White Dog		Robert W. Glass Jr., Richard D. Rogers, Grover B. Helsley, Jacob Goldstein	CBS
1995 (47th)
1995 (47th)	Buffalo Girls	"Part 1"	David Brownlow, Patrick Cyccone Jr., Edward F. Suski, James G. Williams	CBS
1995 (47th)	The Old Curiosity Shop	"Part 1"	Laurie Clarkson, Thomas J. Huth, Craig M. Otte, David M. Weishaar	Disney
1995 (47th)	The Piano Lesson		Michael C. Moore, David E. Fluhr, John Asman, Sam Black	CBS
1995 (47th)	Redwood Curtain		Nelson Stoll, David E. Fluhr, John Asman, Sam Black	ABC
1995 (47th)	The Return of the Native		Tony Dawe, David E. Fluhr, John Asman, Sam Black	CBS
1995 (47th)	Stephen King's The Langoliers	"Part 2"	Jay Meagher, Grant Maxwell	ABC
1996 (48th)
1996 (48th)	Harvest of Fire		Richard I. Birnbaum, David E. Fluhr, Sam Black, John Asman	CBS
1996 (48th)	Andersonville		Mary H. Ellis, Richard D. Rogers, John J. Stephens, Grover B. Helsley	TNT
1996 (48th)	Gulliver's Travels		Simon Kaye, Paul Hamblin, Clive Pendry	NBC
1996 (48th)	Truman		Reinhard Stergar, Wayne Heitman, James Bolt, Joel Fein	HBO
1996 (48th)	The Tuskegee Airmen		Veda Campbell, Wayne Artman, Robert L. Harman, Nick Alphin	HBO
1997 (49th)
1997 (49th)	Titanic	"Part 1"	David Husby, David E. Fluhr, Adam Jenkins, Don Digirolamo	CBS
1997 (49th)	Apollo 11		Kevin Patrick Burns, Jon Taylor, Todd Orr, Larry Scharf	Family
1997 (49th)	Gotti		Robert W. Glass Jr., Ezra Dweck, Dan Wallin, David Lee	HBO
1997 (49th)	Weapons of Mass Distraction		Neil Brody, William Freesh, Mike Olman, Peter Bentley	HBO
1997 (49th)	William Faulkner's Old Man		Steve C. Aaron, Thomas J. Huth, Sam Black, John Asman	CBS
1998 (50th)
1998 (50th)	12 Angry Men		Russell Williams II, David E. Fluhr, Adam Jenkins	Showtime
1998 (50th)	Buffalo Soldiers		Tim Cooney, Pete Elia, Larry Stensvold	TNT
1998 (50th)	From the Earth to the Moon	"1968"	Joe Foglia, Scott Millan, Brad Sherman	HBO
1998 (50th)	From the Earth to the Moon	"That's All There Is"	Joe Foglia, Rick Ash, Adam Sawelson	HBO
1998 (50th)	From the Earth to the Moon	"Le Voyage Dans La Lune"	Joe Foglia, Kevin Patrick Burns, Todd Orr	HBO
1999 (51st)
1999 (51st)	The Rat Pack		Felipe Borrero, Michael C. Casper, Daniel J. Leahy	HBO
1999 (51st)	Joan of Arc	"Part 1"	Lou Solakofski, Orest Sushko, Urmas Rosin	CBS
1999 (51st)	A Lesson Before Dying		Shirley Libby, Rick Ash, Gary Alexander	HBO
1999 (51st)	Pirates of Silicon Valley		Stephen Halbert, Phillip Seretti	TNT
1999 (51st)	The '60s	"Part 1"	Kenn Fuller, Gary Coppola, Craig M. Otte	NBC
1999 (51st)	The Temptations	"Part 1"	Russell Williams II, Dick Alexander, Rick Hart, Richard D. Rogers	NBC

=== 2000s ===
Year	Program	Episode	Nominees	Network
2000 (52nd)
2000 (52nd)	RKO 281		Clive Derbyshire, Mark Taylor, Mike Dowson	HBO
2000 (52nd)	Annie		Edward L. Moskowitz, Terry O'Bright, Keith Rogers	ABC
2000 (52nd)	The Beach Boys: An American Family	"Part 1"	Edward L. Moskowitz, Richard D. Rogers, Dick Alexander, Rick Hart	ABC
2000 (52nd)	Dirty Pictures		John J. Thomson, Kevin Patrick Burns, Todd Orr, Tom Perry	Showtime
2000 (52nd)	Fail Safe		Ed Greene, Hugh Healey, Larry Reed, Peter Baird	CBS
2000 (52nd)	Tuesdays with Morrie		James M. Tanenbaum, Daniel J. Leahy, Michael C. Casper	ABC
2001 (53rd)
2001 (53rd)	Nuremberg	"Part 2"	Lou Solakofski, Orest Sushko, Ian Rankin	TNT
2001 (53rd)	Conspiracy		Peter Glossop, John Hayward, Richard Pryke, Kevin Tayler	HBO
2001 (53rd)	Horatio Hornblower		Colin Martin, Rudi Buckle	A&E
2001 (53rd)	61*		Jeff Wexler, Matthew Iadarola, Gary Gegan, Gary Coppola	HBO
2001 (53rd)	South Pacific		Guntis Sics, Rick Ash, Joe Earle, Joel Moss	ABC
2002 (54th)
2002 (54th)	Band of Brothers	"Carentan"	Colin Charles, Mike Dowson, Mark Taylor	HBO
2002 (54th)	Band of Brothers	"The Breaking Point"	Colin Charles, Kevin Patrick Burns, Todd Orr	HBO
2002 (54th)	Band of Brothers	"Day of Days"	David Stephenson, Mike Dowson, Mark Taylor	HBO
2002 (54th)	The Gathering Storm		David Stephenson, Rick Ash, John Hayward, Richard Pryke	HBO
2002 (54th)	The Lost Battalion		Ulf Herrmann, Ken Teaney, Marshall Garlington	A&E
2003 (55th)
2003 (55th)	Live from Baghdad		Rick Ash, Adam Jenkins, Drew Webster, James M. Tanenbaum	HBO
2003 (55th)	Door to Door		Randy Kiss, Geoff Turner, Perry Leigh Fifield, Martin Fossum	TNT
2003 (55th)	Meredith Willson's The Music Man		Kevin Patrick Burns, Todd Orr, Robert Scherer	ABC
2003 (55th)	A Painted House		Kevin Patrick Burns, Todd Orr, Itzhak Magal	CBS
2003 (55th)	Taken	"Beyond the Sky"	Chris Haire, Richard L. Morrison, Chris Elam, Martin Fossum	Sci Fi
2004 (56th)
2004 (56th)	Angels in America	"Perestroika"	Lee Dichter, Ron Bochar, James Sabat	HBO
2004 (56th)	Horatio Hornblower	"Part 1"	Colin Martin, Rudi Buckle	A&E
2004 (56th)	Ike: Countdown to D-Day		Wayne Heitman, Alan Decker, Tim Philben, Tony Johnson	A&E
2004 (56th)	Something the Lord Made		Rick Ash, Adam Jenkins, Bruce Litecky	HBO
2004 (56th)	Traffic	"Part 1"	Kevin Patrick Burns, Marc Fishman, Tony Lamberti, Eric Batut	USA
2005 (57th)
2005 (57th)	Warm Springs		Mary H. Ellis, Rick Ash, Adam Jenkins	HBO
2005 (57th)	Faith of My Fathers		Richard Schexnayder, Mark Linden, Tara A. Paul, Liam Lockhart, Harry Snodgrass	A&E
2005 (57th)	Lackawanna Blues		Susumu Tokunow, Rick Ash, Adam Jenkins	HBO
2005 (57th)	The Life and Death of Peter Sellers		Simon Kaye, Rick Ash, Adam Jenkins	HBO
2005 (57th)	The Wool Cap		Claude La Haye, Terry O'Bright, Robert L. Harman	TNT
2006 (58th)
2006 (58th)	Into the West	"Dreams and Schemes"	George Tarrant, Dick Alexander, Richard D. Rogers	TNT
2006 (58th)	Elizabeth I	"Part 1"	Ken Campbell, Paul Hamblin	HBO
2006 (58th)	Flight 93		Mark Linden, Tara A. Paul, Liam Lockhart, Harry Snodgrass	A&E
2006 (58th)	Into the West	"Hell on Wheels"	Bayard Carey, Dick Alexander, Richard D. Rogers	TNT
2006 (58th)	Sleeper Cell	"Youmud Din"	Elmo Ponsdomenech, Joe Earle, Roger Pietschmann	Showtime
2006 (58th)	The Ten Commandments	"Part 2"	Alistair Crocker, Terry O'Bright, Keith Rogers	ABC
2007 (59th)
2007 (59th)	Bury My Heart at Wounded Knee		George Tarrant, Rick Ash, Ed Carr	HBO
2007 (59th)	Broken Trail	"Part 2"	Michael Playfair, Cory Mandel, James Porteous	AMC
2007 (59th)	Jane Eyre	"Part 1"	Richard Manton, Stuart Hilliker	PBS
2007 (59th)	Krakatoa: Volcano of Destruction		Frank Coakley, Marc Hatch, Nigel Heath, Joe Powers	Discovery
2007 (59th)	The Lost Room	"The Key and the Clock"	Bayard Carey, Dick Alexander, Richard D. Rogers	Sci Fi
2008 (60th)
2008 (60th)	John Adams	"Don't Tread on Me"	Jay Meagher, Marc Fishman, Tony Lamberti	HBO
2008 (60th)	The Andromeda Strain	"Part 1"	Daryl Powell, Terry O'Bright, Keith Rogers	A&E
2008 (60th)	Comanche Moon	"Part 2"	Darryl L. Frank, Dick Alexander, Richard D. Rogers	CBS
2008 (60th)	John Adams	"Join or Die"	Jay Meagher, Michael Minkler, Bob Beemer	HBO
2008 (60th)	Tin Man	"Part 1"	Eric Lamontagne, Paul A. Sharpe, Iain Pattison, Graeme Hughes	Sci Fi
2009 (61st)
2009 (61st)	Generation Kill	"The Cradle of Civilization"	Colin Nicolson, Paul Hamblin, Martin Jensen	HBO
2009 (61st)	Gifted Hands: The Ben Carson Story		Jeffree Bloomer, Mark Linden, Alan Decker	TNT
2009 (61st)	Grey Gardens		Henry Embry, Rick Ash	HBO
2009 (61st)	Taking Chance		T.J. O'Mara, Rick Ash	HBO
2009 (61st)	24: Redemption		William Gocke, Colin McFarlane, Mike Olman, Ken Kobett	Fox

=== 2010s ===
Year	Program	Episode	Nominees	Network
2010 (62nd)
2010 (62nd)	The Pacific	"Part 2"	Andrew Ramage, Michael Minkler, Daniel J. Leahy	HBO
2010 (62nd)	The Pacific	"Part 5"	Andrew Ramage, Michael Minkler, Daniel J. Leahy, Craig Mann	HBO
2010 (62nd)	The Pacific	"Part 8"	Gary Wilkins, Michael Minkler, Daniel J. Leahy, Marc Fishman	HBO
2010 (62nd)	The Pacific	"Part 9"	Gary Wilkins, Michael Minkler, Daniel J. Leahy	HBO
2011 (63rd)
2011 (63rd)	The Kennedys	"Lancer and Lace"	Henry Embry, Frank Morrone, Stephen Traub, Larold Rebhun	Reelz
2011 (63rd)	Cinema Verite		Petur Hliddal, Lora Hirschberg, Scott R. Lewis, Douglas Murray	HBO
2011 (63rd)	Mildred Pierce	"Part 5"	Bobby Johanson, Leslie Shatz, Drew Kunin, A. Josh Reinhardt	HBO
2011 (63rd)	Too Big to Fail		James Sabat, Chris Jenkins, Bob Beemer	HBO
2012 (64th)
2012 (64th)	Hatfields & McCoys	"Part 1"	Dragos Stanomir, Christian T. Cooke, Brad Zoern	History
2012 (64th)	American Horror Story	"Piggy Piggy"	Sean Rush, Joe Earle, Doug Andham	FX
2012 (64th)	Game Change		David MacMillan, Leslie Shatz, Gabriel J. Serrano	HBO
2012 (64th)	Hemingway & Gellhorn		Nelson Stoll, Lora Hirschberg, Pete Horner, Douglas Murray	HBO
2012 (64th)	Sherlock: A Scandal in Belgravia		Howard Bargroff, John Mooney	PBS
2013 (65th)
2013 (65th)	Behind the Candelabra		Dennis Towns, Larry Blake, Tommy Vicari	HBO
2013 (65th)	American Horror Story: Asylum	"Welcome to Briarcliff"	Sean Rush, Joe Earle, Doug Andham	FX
2013 (65th)	Battlestar Galactica: Blood & Chrome		Rick Bal, John W. Cook II, Peter Nusbaum	Syfy
2013 (65th)	The Bible	"Beginnings"	Dan Johnson, Scott Jones, Jon Thomas	History
2013 (65th)	Phil Spector		Gary Alper, Roy Waldspurger, Michael Barry, Don White	HBO
2014 (66th)
2014 (66th)	Treme	"Sunset on Louisianne"	Bruce Litecky, Andy Kris, Blake Leyh	HBO
2014 (66th)	American Horror Story: Coven	"Fearful Pranks Ensue"	Bruce Litecky, Joe Earle, Doug Andham	FX
2014 (66th)	Fargo	"The Crocodile's Dilemma"	Michael Playfair, David Raines, Mark Server, Chris Philp	FX
2014 (66th)	Killing Kennedy		William Britt, Mark Linden, Tara A. Paul	Nat Geo
2014 (66th)	Sherlock: His Last Vow		John Mooney, Howard Bargroff, Doug Sinclair, Peter Gleaves	PBS
2015 (67th)
2015 (67th)	Bessie		James Emswiller, Robert Fernandez, Damian Volpe, Ed Cherney, Evyen Klean	HBO
2015 (67th)	American Crime	"Episode Eleven"	Benjamin Lowry, Rick Norman, Ryan Davis	ABC
2015 (67th)	American Horror Story: Freak Show	"Magical Thinking"	Bruce Litecky, Joe Earle, Doug Andham, Evan Daum	FX
2015 (67th)	Houdini	"Part 1"	Tamás Csaba, Onnalee Blank, Kenneth R. Burton	History
2015 (67th)	Texas Rising	"Part 4"	Santiago Núñez, Christian T. Cooke, Brad Zoern, Rudy Michael	History
2016 (68th)
2016 (68th)	The People v. O. J. Simpson: American Crime Story	"From the Ashes of Tragedy"	Doug Andham, Joe Earle, Judah Getz, John Bauman	FX
2016 (68th)	Fargo	"The Gift of the Magi"	Martin Lee, Kirk Lynds, Michael Playfair	FX
2016 (68th)	The Night Manager	"Part 5"	Howard Bargroff, Aitor Bernguer	AMC
2016 (68th)	Sherlock: The Abominable Bride		Howard Bargroff, John Mooney, Peter Gleaves, Nick Wollage	PBS
2016 (68th)	True Detective	"Down Will Come"	Daniel J. Leahy, Steve Pederson, Geoffrey Patterson, Ron Bedrosian	HBO
2017 (69th)
2017 (69th)	The Night Of	"The Beach"	Nicholas Renbeck, Michael Barry, Felix Andrew, Larry Hoff	HBO
2017 (69th)	Big Little Lies	"You Get What You Need"	Gavin Fernandes, Louis Gignac, Brendan Beebe	HBO
2017 (69th)	Fargo	"Who Rules the Land of Denial?"	Martin Lee, Kirk Lynds, Michael Playfair, Michael Perftt	FX
2017 (69th)	Genius	"Einstein: Chapter One"	Bob Bronow, Mark Hensley, Petr Forejt	Nat Geo
2017 (69th)	Sherlock: The Lying Detective		Howard Bargroff, John Mooney, Peter Gleaves, Nick Wollage	PBS
2018 (70th)
2018 (70th)	Genius: Picasso	"Chapter One"	Bob Bronow, Mark Hensley, Tamás Csaba	Nat Geo
2018 (70th)	The Assassination of Gianni Versace: American Crime Story	"The Man Who Would Be Vogue"	Doug Andham, Joe Earle, John Bauman, Judah Getz	FX
2018 (70th)	Fahrenheit 451		Tom Fleischman, Henry Embry, George Lara	HBO
2018 (70th)	Twin Peaks	"Part 8"	Ron Eng, Dean Hurley, Douglas Axtell	Showtime
2018 (70th)	Waco	"Operation Showtime"	Craig Mann, Laura Wiest, David Brownlow	Paramount
2019 (71st)
2019 (71st)	Chernobyl	"1:23:45"	Stuart Hilliker, Vincent Piponnier	HBO
2019 (71st)	Deadwood: The Movie		John W. Cook II, William Freesh, Geoffrey Patterson	HBO
2019 (71st)	Fosse/Verdon	"All I Care About Is Love"	Joseph White Jr., Tony Volante, Robert Johanson, Derik Lee	FX
2019 (71st)	True Detective	"The Great War and Modern Memory"	Tateum Kohut, Greg Orloff, Geoffrey Patterson, Biff Dawes	HBO
2019 (71st)	When They See Us	"Part 4"	Joe DeAngelis, Chris Carpenter, Jan McLaughlin	Netflix

=== 2020s ===
Year	Program	Episode	Nominees	Network
2020 (72nd)
2020 (72nd)	Watchmen	"This Extraordinary Being"	Douglas Axtell, Joe DeAngelis, Chris Carpenter	HBO
2020 (72nd)	American Horror Story: 1984	"Camp Redwood"	Alex Altman, Doug Andham, Joe Earle, Judah Getz	FX
2020 (72nd)	Devs	"Episode 3"	Lisa Piñero, Mitch Low, Howard Bargroff, Glen Gathard	FX
2020 (72nd)	El Camino: A Breaking Bad Movie		Phillip W. Palmer, Larry Benjamin, Kevin Valentine, Stacy Michaels	Netflix
2020 (72nd)	Hollywood	"Hooray for Hollywood"	John Bauman, Doug Andham, Joe Earle, Bob Lacivita	Netflix
2021 (73rd)
2021 (73rd)	The Queen's Gambit	"End Game"	Eric Hirsch, Eric Hoehn, Roland Winke, Lawrence Manchester	Netflix
2021 (73rd)	Genius: Aretha	"Respect"	Dan Brennan, Ken Hahn, Jay Meagher	Nat Geo
2021 (73rd)	Mare of Easttown	"Sore Must Be the Storm"	Joe DeAngelis, Chris Carpenter, Richard Bullock	HBO
2021 (73rd)	The Underground Railroad	"Chapter 1: Georgia"	Onnalee Blank, Mathew Waters, Joe White, Kari Vähäkuopus	Prime Video
2021 (73rd)	WandaVision	"The Series Finale"	Danielle Dupre, Chris Giles, Doc Kane, Casey Stone	Disney+
2022 (74th)
2022 (74th)	The White Lotus	"Departures"	Christian Minkler, Ryan Collins, Walter Anderson, Jeffrey Roy	HBO
2022 (74th)	Dopesick	"Pseudo-Addiction"	Nick Offord, Ryan Collins, Jay Meagher	Hulu
2022 (74th)	Gaslit	"Final Days"	John W. Cook II, Ben Wilkins, Devendra Cleary	Starz
2022 (74th)	Moon Knight	"Gods and Monsters"	Bonnie Wild, Scott R. Lewis, Tamás Csaba, Scott Michael Smith	Disney+
2022 (74th)	Pam & Tommy	"The Master Beta"	Nick Offord, Ryan Collins, Juan Cisneros	Hulu
2023 (75th)
2023 (75th)	Daisy Jones & the Six	"Track 10: Rock 'n' Roll Suicide"	Lindsey Alvarez, Mathew Waters, Chris Welcker, Mike Poole	Prime Video
2023 (75th)	Beef	"The Great Fabricator"	Penny Harold, Andrew Garrett Lange, Sean O'Malley	Netflix
2023 (75th)	Dahmer – Monster: The Jeffrey Dahmer Story	"Lionel"	Laura Wiest, Jamie Hardt, Joe Barnett, Amanda Beggs	Netflix
2023 (75th)	Obi-Wan Kenobi	"Part VI"	Danielle Dupre, Scott Lewis, Bonnie Wild, Julian Howarth	Disney+
2023 (75th)	Weird: The Al Yankovic Story		Tony Solis, Richard Bullock, Brian Magrum, Phil McGowan	Roku
2024 (76th)
2024 (76th)	Masters of the Air	"Part Five"	Michael Minkler, Duncan McRae, Tim Fraser, Thor Fienberg	Apple TV+
2024 (76th)	Black Mirror	"Beyond the Sea"	James Ridgway, Richard Miller, Adam Méndez, Daniel Kresco	Netflix
2024 (76th)	Fargo	"The Tragedy of the Commons"	Martin Lee, Kirk Lynds, Michael Playfair, Michael Perfitt	FX
2024 (76th)	Ripley	"VII Macabre Entertainment"	Michael Barry, Larry Zipf, Maurizio Argentieri, Michael Perfitt	Netflix
2024 (76th)	True Detective: Night Country	"Part 6"	Howard Bargroff, Mark Timms, Skúli Helgi Sigurgíslason, Keith Partridge	HBO
2025 (77th)
2025 (77th)	The Penguin	"After Hours"	Rich Bologna, Andy Kris, Chris Gebert, Julien Pirrie	HBO
2025 (77th)	Adolescence	"Episode 1"	Jules Woods, Kiff McManus, Rob Entwistle, Adam Méndez	Netflix
2025 (77th)	Black Mirror	"USS Callister: Into Infinity"	James Ridgway, Stuart Piggott, Adam Méndez, Sam Okell	Netflix
2025 (77th)	Monsters: The Lyle and Erik Menendez Story	"Blame It on the Rain"	Jamie Hardt, Laura Wiest, John Bauman, Mehrnaz Mohabati	Netflix
2025 (77th)	Zero Day	"Episode 6"	Pete Elia, Jason Coleman, Ken Ishii, Michael Perfitt	Netflix
2026 (78th)
2026 (78th)	Beef	"It Will Stay This Way and You Will Obey"	Penny Harold, Andy Lange, Devendra Cleary, Sean O'Malley, Jongkun Park, Judah Getz, Illia Popel	Netflix
2026 (78th)	Black Rabbit	"Isle of Joy"	Larry Benjamin, Tim Hoogenakker, James Weidner, Phil McGowan, Paul Drenning, Ron Mellegers	Netflix
2026 (78th)	DTF St. Louis	"Amphezyne"	John W. Cook II, James Parnell, Akira Fukasawa, Fernanda Domene, James Howe, Alex Wurman	HBO
2026 (78th)	Lord of the Flies	"Piggy"	Niv Adiri, Ande Schurr, Glen Gathard, Tristan Rose, Mark Appleby, James Bishop	Netflix
2026 (78th)	Monster: The Ed Gein Story	"Sick as Your Secrets"	Jamie Hardt, Christina "Chuyue" Wen, Jose Garcia, Mario M. Coletta, Jamison Rabbe, Jacob McNaughton	Netflix

== Sound mixers with multiple awards ==
4 awards

- Adam Jenkins
- Eddie J. Nelson
- George E. Porter

3 awards

- Rick Ash
- Sam Black
- David E. Fluhr
- Robert L. Harman
- Grover B. Helsley
- Richard D. Rogers
- William McCaughey
- Bill Teague

2 awards

- Trevor Black
- David E. Campbell
- Joseph D. Citarella
- Anthony Constantini
- Gordon L. Day
- Mark Dowson
- Robert W. Glass Jr.
- Thomas J. Huth
- Donald F. Johnson
- Daniel J. Leahy
- Mel Metcalfe
- Terry Porter
- John T. Reitz
- Theodore Soderberg
- Mark Taylor
- George Tarrant
- Ray West
- Russell Williams II
- Howard Wilmarth

== Programs with multiple nominations ==
5 nominations

- American Horror Story

4 nominations

- Fargo
- The Pacific
- Roots
- Sherlock

3 nominations

- Band of Brothers
- From the Earth to the Moon
- Genius
- Monster
- True Detective
- The Winds of War

2 nominations

- American Crime Story
- Beef
- Black Mirror
- Horatio Hornblower
- Into the West
- John Adams

== Sound mixers with multiple nominations ==
21 nominations

- Robert L. Harman

20 nominations

- George E. Porter

19 nominations

- Eddie J. Nelson

17 nominations

- William McCaughey

16 nominations

- Richard D. Rogers

15 nominations

- Grover B. Helsley

13 nominations

- Rick Ash

10 nominations

- Joe Earle
- Robert W. Glass Jr.
- Ray West

8 nominations

- Dick Alexander
- Doug Andham
- Sam Black
- David E. Fluhr
- Adam Jenkins
- Daniel J. Leahy
- Mel Metcalfe

7 nominations

- John Asman
- Kevin Patrick Burns
- Joseph D. Citarella
- Hoppy Mehterian
- Tim Philben
- Terry Porter

6 nominations

- Gordon L. Day
- Howard Bargroff
- Thomas J. Huth
- Todd Orr
- Howard Wilmarth
- Howard Wollman

5 nominations

- Alan Bernard
- Jay Meagher
- Scott Millan
- Michael Minkler
- Bill Teague

4 nominations

- John Bauman
- Chris Carpenter
- Jacob Goldstein
- David J. Hudson
- Mark Linden
- Bruce Litecky
- Don MacDougall
- John Mooney
- Terry O'Bright
- Bob Pettis
- Michael Playfair
- Keith A. Wester
- John Wilkinson

3 nominations

- Don Cahn
- David E. Campbell
- Chris Carpenter
- Michael C. Casper
- Anthony Constantini
- Jim Cook
- John W. Cook II
- Tamás Csaba
- Joe DeAngelis
- Mike Dowson
- Henry Embry
- Marc Fishman
- Joe Foglia
- Judy Getz
- Peter Gleaves
- Robin Gregory
- George R. Groves Jr.
- Paul Hamblin
- Charles T. Knight
- Scott R. Lewis
- Adam Méndez
- Geoffrey Patterson
- Tara A. Paul
- Michael Perfitt
- Richard Portman
- Andrew Ramage
- John T. Reitz
- Keith Rogers
- David M. Ronne
- Richard Schexnayder
- Larry Stensvold
- Mark Taylor
- Stan Wetzel
- Laura Wiest
- Russell Williams II

2 nominations

- Gary Alexander
- Wayne Artman
- Douglas Axtell
- Michael Barry
- Eric Batut
- Bob Beemer
- Trevor Black
- Onnalee Blank
- Gary Bolger
- Gary Bourgeois
- Arnold Braun
- Neil Brody
- Bob Bronow
- David Brownlow
- Rudi Buckle
- Bayard Carey
- Colin Charles
- Clark Conrad
- Christian T. Cooke
- Gary Coppola
- Tony Dawe
- Alan Decker
- Don Digirolamo
- Danielle Dupre
- Pete Elia
- Mary H. Ellis
- Joel Fein
- Robert Fernandez
- Tom Fleischman
- Martin Fossum
- Bill Freesh
- Dominick Gaffey
- Stanley P. Gordon
- Roy Granville
- Charles Grenzbach
- Jamie Hardt
- Maury Harris
- Rick Hart
- John Hayward
- Wayne Heitman
- Mark Hensley
- Stuart Hilliker
- Lora Hirschberg
- Walter Hoylman
- Bobby Johanson
- Donald F. Johnson
- Simon Kaye
- Andy Kris
- Drew Kunin
- Tony Lamberti
- David Lee
- Martin Lee
- Charles Lewis
- Liam Lockheart
- Kirk Lynds
- Craig Mann
- Bill Marky
- Colin Martin
- Grant Maxwell
- Melvin M. Metcalfe
- Don Minkler
- Lee Minkler
- Edward L. Moskowitz
- Joel Moss
- Douglas Murray
- Doug Nelson
- William Nicholson
- Jacques Nosco
- Mike Olman
- Craig M. Otte
- Clive Pendry
- Thom K. Piper
- Ken Polk
- Richard Pryke
- Richard Raguse
- James Ridgway
- Kenneth B. Ross
- Sean Rush
- James Sabat
- Leslie Shatz
- Harry Snodgrass
- Theodore Soderberg
- Lou Solakofski
- David Stephenson
- Nelson Stoll
- Alan L. Stone
- Don Summer
- Oren Sushko
- Peter Sutton
- James M. Tanenbaum
- George Tarrant
- Curly Thirlwell
- Doug E. Turner
- Dan Wallin
- Mathew Waters
- Joe White
- Bonnie Wild
- Gary Wilkins
- Nick Wollage
- Brad Zoern
