= Cinema Audio Society Awards 2025 =

Awards presented for sound mixing in 2025

62nd Cinema Audio Society Awards

March 7, 2026

Motion Pictures – Live Action:
F1

The 62nd Cinema Audio Society Awards were held on March 7, 2026, at the Beverly Hilton in Los Angeles, California, to honor outstanding achievements in sound mixing in film and television of 2025. The nominations were announced on January 20, 2026.

American sound mixer Skip Lievsay received the Career Achievement Award while Mexican filmmaker Guillermo del Toro was honored with the Filmmaker Award.

The ceremony was hosted by comedian and actor Chris Hardwick.

== Winners and nominees ==
Winners are listed first and in bold.

=== Film ===
Motion Pictures – Live Action	Motion Pictures – Animated
**F1 – Gareth John (production sound mixer), Gary A. Rizzo, Juan Peralta (re-recording mixers), Alan Meyerson (scoring mixer), Michael Miller (ADR mixer), Dennis Leonard (foley mixer), and Elizabeth Marston (foley mixer)**; Frankenstein – Greg Chapman (production sound mixer), Brad Zoern, Christian Cooke (re-recording mixers), Peter Cobbin, Kirsty Whalley (scoring mixers), Sebastian Vaskio (ADR mixer), and Kevin Schultz (foley mixer); Mission: Impossible – The Final Reckoning – Lloyd Dudley (production sound mixer), Chris Burdon, Mark Taylor (re-recording mixers), Chris Fogel (scoring mixer), Nick Roberts (ADR mixer), and Adam Mendez (foley mixer); One Battle After Another – José Antonio García (production sound mixer), Christopher Scarabosio, Tony Villaflor (re-recording mixers), Graeme Stewart (scoring mixer), Kevin Schultz (foley mixer), and Chelsea Body (foley mixer); Sinners – Chris Welcker (production sound mixer), Brandon Proctor, Steve Boeddeker (re-recording mixers), Chris Fogel (scoring mixer), Jason Oliver (ADR mixer), Tami Treadwell (ADR mixer), and Darrin Mann (foley mixer)	**KPop Demon Hunters – Howard London (original dialogue mixer), Michael Babcock, Tony Lamberti (re-recording mixers), Erich Talaba (scoring mixer), and Giorgi Lekishvili (foley mixer)**; The Bad Guys 2 – Ken Gombos (original dialogue mixer), Julian Slater, Greg P. Russell (re-recording mixers), Sam Okell (scoring mixer), Paul Pirola (foley mixer), and Ryan Squires (foley mixer); Elio – Vince Caro (production sound mixer), Paul McGrath (production sound mixer), Lora Hirschberg, Bonnie Wild (re-recording mixers), Scott Michael Smith (scoring mixer), and Richard Duarte (foley mixer); The SpongeBob Movie: Search for SquarePants – Will Files, Mark Paterson, Steve Neal (re-recording mixers), Shawn Murphy (scoring mixer), and Jordan McClain (foley mixer); Zootopia 2 – Gabriel Guy (original dialogue & re-recording mixer), Jeremy Scott Olsen (original dialogue mixer), David Fluhr (re-recording mixer), Warren Brown (scoring mixer), Doc Kane (ADR mixer), and Richard Duarte (foley mixer)
Motion Pictures – Documentary
**Becoming Led Zeppelin – Nigel Albermaniche (production sound mixer) and Nick Bergh (re-recording mixer)**; I Was Born This Way – Travis Franklin (production sound mixer), Leslie Gaston-Bird (re-recording mixer), and Gabriel Guy (re-recording mixer); It's Never Over, Jeff Buckley – David Hocs (production sound mixer) and Lewis Goldstein (re-recording mixer); Lilith Fair: Building a Mystery – Steve Foster (re-recording mixer) and Lana Marie Hattar (re-recording mixer); Strange Journey: The Story of Rocky Horror – Paul Stula (production sound mixer) and Tony Solis (re-recording mixer)

=== Television ===
Television Series – One Hour	Television Series – Half Hour
**The Pitt: "7:00 P.M." – Von Varga (production sound mixer), Todd M. Grace (re-recording mixer), Edward C. Carr III (re-recording mixer), Tami Treadwell (ADR mixer), and Alex Jongbloed (foley mixer) (HBO Max)**; Andor: "Who Are You?" – Danny Hambrook (production sound mixer), David Acord (re-recording mixer), Geoff Foster (scoring mixer), Nick Roberts (ADR mixer), and Richard Duarte (foley mixer) (Disney+); Pluribus: "We Is Us" – Phillip W. Palmer (production sound mixer), Larry Benjamin (re-recording mixer), Tim Hoogenakker (re-recording mixer), Dave Porter (scoring mixer), Judah Getz (ADR mixer), Jamison Rabbe (ADR mixer), and Ron Mellegers (foley mixer) (Apple TV); Severance: "Cold Harbor" – David J. Schwartz (production sound mixer), Bob Chefalas (re-recording mixer), Jacob Ribicoff (re-recording mixer), Chris Fogel (scoring mixer), Kris Chevannes (ADR mixer), and George A. Lara (foley mixer) (Apple TV); Stranger Things: "Chapter Eight: The Rightside Up" – Michael P. Clark (production sound mixer), Mark Paterson (re-recording mixer), Will Files (re-recording mixer), Steve Neal (re-recording mixer), Craig Henighan (re-recording mixer), Carlos Ramirez (scoring mixer), and Judah Getz (foley mixer) (Netflix)	**The Studio: "The Golden Globes" – Buck Robinson (production sound mixer), Lindsey Alvarez (re-recording mixer), Fred Howard (re-recording mixer), Adrià Serrano (scoring mixer), Brian Magrum (ADR mixer), and Ron Mellegers (foley mixer) (Apple TV)**; The Bear: "Scallop" – Scott D. Smith (production sound mixer), Steve "Major" Giammaria (re-recording mixer), Patrick Christensen (ADR mixer), Ryan Collison (foley mixer), and Connor Nagy (foley mixer) (FX); Hacks: "I Love LA" – Jim Lakin (production sound mixer), John W. Cook II (re-recording mixer), James Parnell (re-recording mixer), David Stal (scoring mixer), Fernanda Domene (ADR mixer), and Jacob McNaughton (foley mixer) (HBO Max); Murderbot: "FreeCommerce" – Michael LaCroix (production sound mixer), Alexandra Fehrman (re-recording mixer), Emilie Corpuz (re-recording mixer), Alvin Wee (scoring mixer), Sebastian Vaskio (ADR mixer), and Erik Culp (foley mixer) (Apple TV); Only Murders in the Building: "LESTR" – Joseph White Jr. (production sound mixer), Kyle O'Neal (re-recording mixer), Mathew Waters (re-recording mixer), Alan DeMoss (scoring mixer), and Mitch Kluge (foley mixer) (Hulu)
Non-Theatrical Motion Pictures or Limited Series	Non-Fiction, Variety or Music – Series or Specials
**Adolescence: "Episode 1" – Kiff McManus (production sound mixer), Rob Entwistle (production sound mixer), Jules Woods (re-recording mixer), James Drake (re-recording mixer), Mike Tehrani (ADR mixer), Simon Diggins (ADR mixer), and Adam Mendez (foley mixer) (Netflix)**; Black Mirror: "USS Callister: Into Infinity" – Stuart Piggott (production sound mixer), James Ridgway (re-recording mixer), Sam Okell (scoring mixer), Mike Tehrani (ADR mixer), and Adam Mendez (foley mixer) (Netflix); Chief of War: "The Chief of War" – Fred Enholmer (production sound mixer), Thomas Visser (production sound mixer), Carlos Sanches (re-recording mixer), Josh Eckberg (re-recording mixer), Chris Navarro (ADR mixer), Vedat Kiyici (ADR mixer), and Andrii Starykovskyi (foley mixer) (Apple TV); Love, Death + Robots: "Volume Four" – Joe DeAngelis (re-recording mixer), Chris Carpenter (re-recording mixer), and Rob Cairns (scoring mixer) (Netflix); Star Trek: Section 31 – Bill McMillan (production sound mixer), Todd M. Grace (re-recording mixer), Edward C. Carr III (re-recording mixer), Michael Perfitt (scoring mixer), Tami Treadwell (ADR mixer), and Darrin Mann (foley mixer) (Paramount+)	**Billy Joel: And So It Goes: "Part One" – Mark Mandler (production sound mixer), David Mitlyng (production sound mixer), Michael Stewart (production sound mixer), Bob Chefalas (re-recording mixer), Bradshaw Leigh (score & music mixer), Brian Ruggles (music mixer), and Jay Vicari (music mixer) (HBO)**; 100 Foot Wave: "The Eddie" – Keith Hodne (re-recording mixer) (HBO); Formula 1: Drive to Survive: "Under New Management" – Steve Speed (re-recording mixer), Lydia Brown (re-recording mixer), and Nick Fry (re-recording mixer) (Netflix); John Candy: I Like Me – Brad Dawe (production sound mixer), Michael Kool (production sound mixer), Gary A. Rizzo (re-recording mixer), Tyler Strickland (scoring mixer), and Oren Hadar (scoring mixer) (Prime Video); Pee-wee as Himself: "Part One" – John Mathie (production sound mixer) and Daniel Timmons (re-recording mixer) (HBO)

=== Special awards ===
Filmmaker Award

- **Guillermo del Toro**

Career Achievement Award

- **Skip Lievsay**

Student Recognition Award

- **Mingxi Xu (National Film and Television School)**
