= Cinema Audio Society Award for Outstanding Achievement in Sound Mixing for a Motion Picture – Documentary =

Annual US film award

- Country: United States
- Presented by: Cinema Audio Society
- First award: 2017
- Currently held by: Noah Alexander, Christopher Barnett, Roy Waldspurger – Music by John Williams (2024)

The Cinema Audio Society Award for Outstanding Achievement in Sound Mixing for a Motion Picture – Documentary is an annual award given by the Cinema Audio Society to documentary motion picture sound mixers for their outstanding achievements in sound mixing. It has been awarded since 2017.

== Winners and nominees ==
=== 2010s ===
Year	Film	Nominees
2016 (24th)	The Music of Strangers	Dennis Hamlin, Dimitri Tisseyre (production mixers); Pete Horner (re-recording mixer)
2016 (24th)	13th	Jeffrey Perkins (production mixer)
2016 (24th)	Eat That Question: Frank Zappa in His Own Words	Marc Fragstein, Marvin Keil, Armelle Mahé (re-recording mixers)
2016 (24th)	Gleason	Mark A. Rozett, James Scullion (re-recording mixers)
2016 (24th)	O.J.: Made in America	Keith Hodne, Eric di Stefano (re-recording mixers)
2017 (25th)	Jane	Lee Smith (production mixer); David E. Fluhr, Warren Shaw (re-recording mixers); Derick Lee (scoring mixer); Chris Navarro (ADR mixer); Ryan Maguire (foley mixer)
2017 (25th)	An Inconvenient Sequel: Truth to Power	Gabriel Monts (production mixer); Zach Martin, Gary A. Rizzo, Kent Sparling (re-recording mixers); Jeff Beal (scoring mixer); Jason Butler (foley mixer)
2017 (25th)	Eric Clapton: Life in 12 Bars	Tim Cavagin, Brad Zoern, William Miller (re-recording mixers); Adam Mendez (ADR mixer)
2017 (25th)	Gaga: Five Foot Two	Jason Dotts, Jonathan Wales (re-recording mixers)
2017 (25th)	Long Strange Trip	David Silberberg (production mixer); Bob Chefalas, Jacob Ribicoff (re-recording mixers)
2018 (26th)	Free Solo	Jim Hurst (production mixer); Tom Fleischman, Ric Schnupp (re-recording mixers); Tyson Lozensky (scoring mixer); David Boulton (ADR mixer); Joana Niza Braga (foley mixer)
2018 (26th)	Fahrenheit 11/9	Mark Roy (production mixer); Andy Kris, Skip Lievsay, Lee Salevan (re-recording mixers)
2018 (26th)	Quincy	Alan Hicks (production mixer); Jonathan Wales (re-recording mixers)
2018 (26th)	They'll Love Me When I'm Dead	Rob Fillmore (production mixer); Brian Riordan (re-recording mixer)
2018 (26th)	Won't You Be My Neighbor?	Pete Horner, Jeff King (re-recording mixers)
2019 (27th)	Making Waves: The Art of Cinematic Sound	David J. Turner (production mixer); Tom Myers (re-recording mixer); Dan Blanck (scoring mixer); Frank Rinella (foley mixer)
2019 (27th)	Apollo 11	Brian Eimer, Eric Milano (re-recording mixers)
2019 (27th)	Echo in the Canyon	John W. Rampey (production mixer); Chris Jenkins, Paul Karpinski (re-recording mixers); Dave Way (music mixer)
2019 (27th)	Miles Davis: Birth of the Cool	Gautam Choudhury (production mixer), Benny Mouthon (re-recording mixer)
2019 (27th)	Woodstock: Three Days That Defined a Generation	Kevin Peters (production mixer), Ryan Collison (re-recording mixer)

=== 2020s ===
Year	Film	Nominees
2020 (28th)	The Bee Gees: How Can You Mend a Broken Heart	Jeff King, Gary A. Rizzo (re-recording mixers)
2020 (28th)	David Attenborough: A Life on Our Planet	Graham Wild (production mixer); Gareth Cousins (scoring mixer)
2020 (28th)	My Octopus Teacher	Barry Donnelly (production mixer); Charl Moster (foley mixer)
2020 (28th)	The Social Dilemma	Mark A. Crawford (production mixer); Scott R. Lewis (re-recording mixers); Mark Venezia (scoring mixer); Jason Butler (foley mixer)
2020 (28th)	Zappa	Montgomery Buckles (production mixer); Lon Bender, Martyn Zub (re-recording mixers)
2021 (29th)	Summer of Soul (...Or, When the Revolution Could Not Be Televised)	Paul Hsu, Robert Fernandez, Paul Massey (re-recording mixers)
2021 (29th)	Becoming Cousteau	Phil McGowan, Tony Volante (re-recording mixers)
2021 (29th)	Tina	Caleb Mose (production mixer); Lawrence Everson, Phil McGowan (re-recording mixers)
2021 (29th)	Val	Michael Haldin (production mixer); John Bolen (re-recording mixer); Garth Stevenson (scoring mixer); Mitch Dorf (ADR mixer)
2021 (29th)	The Velvet Underground	Juliana Henao Mesa (production mixer); Leslie Shatz (re-recording mixer)
2022 (30th)	Moonage Daydream	Paul Massey, David Giammarco (re-recording mixers); Jens Rosenlund Petersen (ADR mixer)
2022 (30th)	Good Night Oppy	Mark Mangini (re-recording mixer); Greg Hayes (scoring mixer)
2022 (30th)	Hallelujah: Leonard Cohen, A Journey, A Song	Bob Edwards, Scott R. Lewis (re-recording mixers)
2022 (30th)	Louis Armstrong’s Black and Blues	Leslie Shatz (re-recording mixer); Louis Schultz (scoring mixer)
2022 (30th)	The Volcano: Rescue from Whakaari	Joe Milner (re-recording mixer); Jacob Johnston (scoring mixer); Kevin Carvalho (foley mixer)
2023 (31st)	32 Sounds	Laura Cunningham (production mixer); Mark Mangini (re-recording mixer); Ben Greenberg (scoring mixer); Bobby Johanson (ADR mixer); Blake Collins (foley mixer)
2023 (31st)	American Symphony	Tom Paul, Tristan Baylis (re-recording mixers); Ryan Collison (foley mixer)
2023 (31st)	Little Richard: I Am Everything	Tom Paul (re-recording mixer)
2023 (31st)	Still: A Michael J. Fox Movie	Skip Lievsay, Paul Urmson, Joel Dougherty (re-recording mixers); John Michael Caldwell (scoring mixer); Micah Blaichman (foley mixer)
2023 (31st)	Taylor Swift: The Eras Tour	Jacob Farron Smith (production mixer); John Ross, David Payne, Christopher Rowe (re-recording mixers)
2024 (32nd)	Music by John Williams	Noah Alexander (production mixer); Christopher Barnett, Roy Waldspurger (re-recording mixers)
2024 (32nd)	The Blue Angels	Sean Peterson (production mixer), Lindsey Alvarez (re-recording mixer); Forest Christenson (scoring mixer)
2024 (32nd)	Elton John: Never Too Late	Jae Kim (production mixer); Elmo Ponsdomenech, Teddy Salas (re-recording mixers)
2024 (32nd)	I Am: Celine Dion	Irene Taylor (production mixer); Lora Hirschberg (re-recording mixer); Tim Oliver (scoring mixer)
2024 (32nd)	Super/Man: The Christopher Reeve Story	Austin Plocher (production mixer); Greg Gettens (re-recording mixer); Steve McLaughlin (scoring mixer); Daniel Nicholls (foley mixer)
2025 (33rd)	Becoming Led Zeppelin	Nigel Albermaniche (production mixer); Nick Bergh (re-recording mixer)
2025 (33rd)	It's Never Over, Jeff Buckley	David Hocs (production mixer); Lewis Goldstein (re-recording mixer)
2025 (33rd)	Lilith Fair: Building a Mystery	Steve Foster, Lana Marie Hattar (re-recording mixers)
2025 (33rd)	Strange Journey: The Story of Rocky Horror	Paul Stula (production mixer); Tony Solis (re-recording mixer)
2025 (33rd)	I Was Born This Way	Travis Franklin (production mixer); Leslie Gaston-Bird, Gabriel Guy (re-recording mixers)

== See also ==
- Academy Award for Best Sound
- BAFTA Award for Best Sound
