= Buffalo Soldiers (1997 film) =

American Western TV film

- Screenplay by: Frank Military; Susan Rhinehart
- Story by: Jonathan Klein; Frank Military
- Directed by: Charles Haid
- Starring: Lamont Bentley; Tom Bower; Timothy Busfield; Gabriel Casseus; Danny Glover; Bob Gunton; Keith Jefferson; Robert Knott; Carl Lumbly; Clifton Powell; Matt Ross; Glynn Turman; Michael Warren; Mykelti Williamson
- Composer: Joel McNeely
- Country of origin: United States
- Original language: English

Production
- Executive producers: Danny Glover; John Watson; Pen Densham; Richard B. Lewis; David R. Ginsburg
- Producer: Gordon Wolf
- Cinematography: William Wages
- Editor: Andrew Doerfer
- Running time: 100 minutes
- Production companies: Citadel Entertainment; Trilogy Entertainment Group

Original release
- Network: TNT
- Release: December 7, 1997

Buffalo Soldiers is a 1997 American Western television film directed by Charles Haid and starring an ensemble cast including Lamont Bentley, Tom Bower, Timothy Busfield, Gabriel Casseus, Danny Glover, Bob Gunton, Keith Jefferson, Robert Knott, Carl Lumbly, Clifton Powell, Matt Ross, Glynn Turman, Michael Warren, and Mykelti Williamson. Set in 1880, the film tells the true story of the black cavalry corps known as the Buffalo Soldiers, who protected the Western territories after the end of the American Civil War.

Buffalo Soldiers premiered on TNT on December 7, 1997. The film received three nominations at the 50th Primetime Creative Arts Emmy Awards.

== Awards and nominations ==
Year	Award	Category	Recipient(s)	Result
1998	ADG Excellence in Production Design Awards	Excellence in Production Design for a Television Movie or Mini-Series	Michael Baugh	Nominated
1998	American Society of Cinematographers Awards	Outstanding Achievement in Cinematography in a Movie of the Week or Pilot	William Wages	Won
1998	Cinema Audio Society Awards	Outstanding Achievement in Sound Mixing for Television – Movie of the Week, Mini-Series or Specials	Tim Cooney; Pete Elia; Larry Stensvold	Nominated
1998	Directors Guild of America Awards	Outstanding Directing – Miniseries or TV Film	Charles Haid	Nominated
1998	NAACP Image Awards	Outstanding Television Movie, Mini-Series or Dramatic Special	Buffalo Soldiers	Nominated
1998	NAACP Image Awards	Outstanding Actor in a Television Movie, Mini-Series or Dramatic Special	Danny Glover	Nominated
1998	NAACP Image Awards	Outstanding Actor in a Television Movie, Mini-Series or Dramatic Special	Carl Lumbly	Nominated
1998	Primetime Creative Arts Emmy Awards	Outstanding Art Direction for a Miniseries or Movie	Michael Baugh; William Vail	Nominated
1998	Primetime Creative Arts Emmy Awards	Outstanding Cinematography for a Miniseries or Movie	William Wages	Nominated
1998	Primetime Creative Arts Emmy Awards	Outstanding Sound Mixing for a Miniseries or Movie	Tim Cooney; Pete Elia; Larry Stensvold	Nominated
1998	Spur Awards	Best Drama Script	Frank Military; Susan Rhinehart	Won
