= Redwood Curtain =

1995 television film by John Korty

- Based on: Redwood Curtain by Lanford Wilson
- Screenplay by: Ed Namzug
- Directed by: John Korty
- Starring: Jeff Daniels; Lea Salonga; Debra Monk; Catherine Hicks; John Lithgow
- Composer: Lawrence Shragge
- Country of origin: United States
- Original language: English

Production
- Executive producer: Richard Welsh
- Producers: Rick Rosenberg; Robert W. Christiansen
- Cinematography: Ronnie Taylor
- Editor: Scott Vickrey
- Running time: 100 minutes
- Production companies: Chris/Rose Productions; Hallmark Hall of Fame Productions

Original release
- Network: ABC
- Release: April 23, 1995

Redwood Curtain is an American drama television film that premiered on ABC on April 23, 1995, as part of the Hallmark Hall of Fame anthology series. The film is directed by John Korty from a teleplay by Ed Namzug, based on the play of the same name by Lanford Wilson. It stars Jeff Daniels, Lea Salonga, Debra Monk, Catherine Hicks, and John Lithgow, with Daniels and Monk reprising their roles from the original 1993 Broadway production. The film earned a Primetime Emmy Award nomination for its sound mixing. The film was shot in Santa Cruz, California.

== Premise ==
In her search for her biological father, an Amerasian piano prodigy comes to California's redwood forests to an area populated by Vietnam veterans unable to reintegrate into society.

== Cast ==
- Jeff Daniels as Lyman Fellers
- Lea Salonga as Geri Riordan
- Catherine Hicks as Julia Riordan
- John Lithgow as Laird Riordan
- Debra Monk as Geneva Riordan
- Shirley Douglas as Schyler Noyes
- Vilma Silva as Zenaida
- Joy Carlin as Mrs. Cole
- Steven Anthony Jones as Nate Stone
- Jarion Monroe as Leon Shea
- Cab Covay as Mad John
- R. Blakeslee Colby as Reverend Grant
- Jonathan Korty as Dennis McCaw

== Reception ==
=== Critical response ===
Jeremy Gerard of Variety noted that the original stage play was a "spookily amorphous affair", and that it included an "edgy, funny performance by Debra Monk." Of the television film, Gerard called it a "ponderous, cliche-riddled adaptation", with a performance by Monk that suffered in her character having her "spirit drained". Conversely, Gerard commended director John Korty in his drawing "a nicely restrained performance out of John Lithgow". Ken Tucker of Entertainment Weekly wrote that the film "is full of fortune-cookie verbiage". Tom Jicha of the Sun-Sentinel praised the performances of the cast, but criticized the story, calling it "lethargic" and "two hours of talking heads on uninteresting or unlikable bodies".

=== Accolades ===
| Year | Award | Category | Recipients | Result | Ref. |
|---|---|---|---|---|---|
| 1995 | 47th Primetime Creative Arts Emmy Awards | Outstanding Sound Mixing for a Drama Miniseries or a Special | Nelson Stoll; David E. Fluhr; John Asman; Sam Black | Nominated | |
| 1996 | 3rd Cinema Audio Society Awards | Outstanding Achievement in Sound Mixing for Television – Movie of the Week, Mini-Series or Specials | Nelson Stoll; David E. Fluhr; John Asman; Sam Black | Nominated | |
