= Don Digirolamo =

American re-recording mixer

- Education: Northeastern Illinois University
- Occupation: Re-recording mixer
- Years active: 1978–2011

Don Digirolamo is an American retired re-recording mixer. He was nominated for three Academy Awards, winning once for his work on the film E.T. the Extra-Terrestrial (1982).

== Awards and nominations ==
=== Academy Awards ===
Year	Category	Nominated work	Result	Ref.
1983	Best Sound	E.T. the Extra-Terrestrial	Won	
1988	Best Sound	Empire of the Sun	Nominated	
1989	Best Sound	Who Framed Roger Rabbit	Nominated	

=== British Academy Film Awards ===
Year	Category	Nominated work	Result	Ref.
1983	Best Sound	E.T. the Extra-Terrestrial	Nominated	
1984	Best Sound	Flashdance	Nominated	

=== Primetime Emmy Awards ===
Year	Category	Nominated work	Result	Ref.
1994	Outstanding Sound Mixing for a Drama Miniseries or a Special	Oldest Living Confederate Widow Tells All	Nominated	
1997	Outstanding Sound Mixing for a Drama Miniseries or a Special	Titanic	Won	

=== Cinema Audio Society Awards ===
Year	Category	Nominated work	Result	Ref.
1995	Outstanding Achievement in Sound Mixing for Television – Movie of the Week, Mini-Series or Specials	"Part I"; Oldest Living Confederate Widow Tells All	Nominated	
1997	Outstanding Achievement in Sound Mixing for Television – Movie of the Week, Mini-Series or Specials	"Part II"; In Cold Blood	Nominated	
