= Wallenberg: A Hero's Story =

- Genre: Biographical film
- Based on: Lost Hero: The Mystery of Raoul Wallenberg by Thurston B. Clarke; Frederick E. Werbell
- Written by: Gerald Green
- Directed by: Lamont Johnson
- Starring: Richard Chamberlain
- Theme music composer: Ernest Gold
- Countries of origin: United States; Yugoslavia
- Original language: English

Production
- Executive producer: Dick Berg
- Producer: Richard Irving
- Production location: Yugoslavia
- Cinematography: Charles Correll
- Editor: Paul LaMastra
- Running time: 200 minutes
- Production companies: Dick Berg-Stonehenge Productions; Paramount Television

Original release
- Network: NBC
- Release: April 8, 1985

Wallenberg: A Hero's Story is a 1985 NBC television film starring Richard Chamberlain about Raoul Wallenberg, a Swedish diplomat who was instrumental in saving thousands of Hungarian Jews from the Holocaust.

The film was nominated for nine Primetime Emmy Awards (winning four) and a Golden Globe Award (for Richard Chamberlain).

== Cast ==
- Richard Chamberlain as Raoul Wallenberg
- Alice Krige as Baroness Lisl Kemeny
- Kenneth Colley as Adolf Eichmann
- Melanie Mayron as Sonja Kahn
- Stuart Wilson as Baron Gabor Kemeny
- Bibi Andersson as Major Von Dardel
- David Robb as Per Anger
- Mark Rylance as Nikki Fodor
- Ralph Arliss as Teicholz
- Keve Hjelm as Jacob Wallenberg
- Jimmy Nail as Vilmos Langfelder
- Olaf Pooley as Tibor Moritz
- Georgia Slowe as Hannah Moritz
- Guy Deghy as Admiral Nikolas Horthy
- Curt Lowens as Dieter Wisleceny
- Bruce Purchase as Rabbi Mendel
- Relja Bašić as Colonel László Ferenczy
- Peter Capell as Kalman Lauer
- Tom Ormeny as Captain Bator
- Aubrey Morris as Colonel Ferenc Szálasi
- Thomas Hellberg as Danielsson
- Ferdy Mayne as Rabbi Preiss
- Don Fellows as Olsen
- Peter Karsten as Von Fremd
- Werner Pochath as 1st SS Sergeant
- Vili Matula as 2nd SS Sergeant
- Lena Olin as Marta
- Charles Brauer as Generalmajor Schmidthuber
- Venco Kapural as Rotha
- Per Anger as narrator
- Josipa Lisac as singer

== Awards and nominations ==
Year	Award	Category	Nominee(s)	Result	Ref.
1985	Golden Reel Awards	Best Sound Editing – Television Movies and Specials (including Mini-Series) – Music	Jeff Clark, Paul Timothy Carden, Nicholas Eliopoulos, Jeff Koford, Donald J. Malouf, Richard Raderman, Greg Stacy, Dan Thomas, James Troutman, Mike Virnig, Tally Paulos, and John La Salandra	Won	
1985	Primetime Emmy Awards	Outstanding Drama/Comedy Special	Dick Berg, Richard Irving, Lamont Johnson, and Phillip Levitan	Nominated	
1985	Primetime Emmy Awards	Outstanding Lead Actor in a Limited Series or a Special	Richard Chamberlain	Nominated	
1985	Primetime Emmy Awards	Outstanding Directing in a Limited Series or a Special	Lamont Johnson	Won	
1985	Primetime Emmy Awards	Outstanding Writing in a Limited Series or a Special	Gerald Green	Nominated	
1985	Primetime Emmy Awards	Outstanding Cinematography for a Limited Series or a Special	Charles Correll	Nominated	
1985	Primetime Emmy Awards	Outstanding Achievement in Costuming	Thomas Welsh, Bob E. Horn, and Marko Cerovac	Won	
1985	Primetime Emmy Awards	Outstanding Film Editing for a Limited Series or a Special	Paul LaMastra	Won	
1985	Primetime Emmy Awards	Outstanding Film Sound Editing for a Limited Series or a Special	Jeff Clark, Paul Timothy Carden, Nicholas Eliopoulos, Jeff Koford, Donald J. Malouf, Richard Raderman, Greg Stacy, Dan Thomas, James Troutman, Mike Virnig, Tally Paulos, and John La Salandra	Won	
1985	Primetime Emmy Awards	Outstanding Film Sound Mixing for a Limited Series or a Special	Robin Gregory, David J. Hudson, Mel Metcalfe, and Terry Porter	Nominated	
1985	Television Critics Association Awards	Outstanding Achievement in Specials		Nominated	
1986	American Cinema Editors Awards	Best Edited Episode for a Television Mini-Series	Paul LaMastra (for "Part I")	Nominated	
1986	American Cinema Editors Awards	Best Edited Episode for a Television Mini-Series	Paul LaMastra (for "Part II")	Won	
1986	Artios Awards	Outstanding Achievement in Mini-Series Casting	Eleanor Cooke	Nominated	
1986	Directors Guild of America Awards	Outstanding Directorial Achievement in Dramatic Specials	Lamont Johnson	Nominated	
1986	Golden Globe Awards	Best Actor in a Miniseries or Motion Picture Made for Television	Richard Chamberlain	Nominated	
