= Mary H. Ellis =

American production sound mixer

Mary H. Ellis is an American production sound mixer. She has been nominated twice for an Academy Award for Best Sound Mixing (for First Man in 2019 and Baby Driver in 2018). Both films also received nominations for the BAFTA Award for Best Sound. Mary is the second female production mixer to be nominated for an Academy Award.

== Life/Education ==
Ellis studied at the University of Alabama with a degree in Film and Television. Ellis is from Atlanta. She said of working on Baby Driver, “Being an Atlanta local, I grew up in this industry with most of the crew on this show, so there is a lot of respectful assistance.”

== Career ==
Her first big break was working on Fried Green Tomatoes.

== Awards ==
She won an Emmy Award for Outstanding Single-Camera Sound Mixing for a Miniseries or a Movie for her work Warm Springs in 2005. She was nominated for an Emmy Award for her work on Andersonville in 1996. Mary has also been nominated for four Cinema Audio Society Awards.

Ellis was named to the Cinema Audio Society Board of Directors in 2019.
