= Harry Snodgrass =

American audio engineer

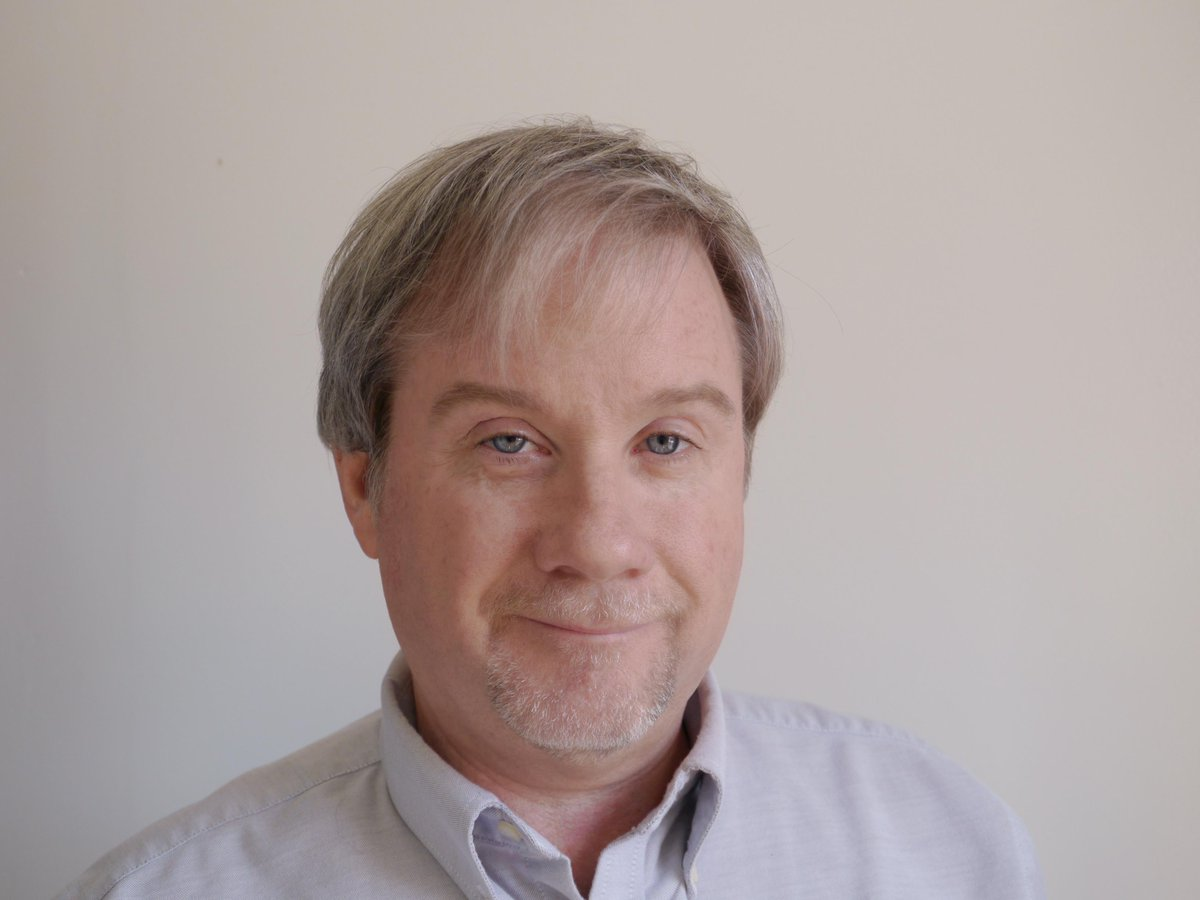
- Born: Philadelphia, Pennsylvania, U.S.
- Occupation: Sound editor
- Years active: 1985–present
- Spouse: Holly Harter

Harry Snodgrass is a sound designer, supervisor sound editor, and re-recording mixer for film, television, and video games. Some of the films he has worked on are Napoleon Dynamite, Hot Shots! Part Deux, Alien 3, Predator 2, Robin Hood: Men in Tights, and American Pie. Television projects include Electric Dreams, Scorpion, Preacher, Flight 93, Future Man, The Good Doctor, Empire, and Underground. He also spends his free time working at Lehigh Carbon Community College as a sound design teacher.

He won an Emmy Award for sound editing for Flight 93 in 2006 as well as a Cinema Audio Society Award for the same. He also has been nominated for an Emmy Award for sound editing and sound mixing four times. He was involved in the audio restoration of such classic films as Touch of Evil, Vertigo, and Rear Window. The character Artimus Snodgrass in the film The Sasquatch Gang was named Snodgrass because of his work on the film. He also has provided character voices for video games and films. He is a pioneer in the streaming media industry since 1998.
