= William McCaughey =

American sound engineer

- Born: December 12, 1929; Kansas City, Missouri, United States
- Died: May 26, 2000 (aged 70); Rancho Cucamonga, California, United States
- Other name: William L. McCaughey
- Occupation: Sound engineer
- Years active: 1970-1992

William McCaughey (December 12, 1929 – May 26, 2000) was an American sound engineer. He won an Oscar for Best Sound and was nominated for four more in the same category.

== Selected filmography ==
McCaughey won an Academy Award and was nominated for four more:

Won

- The Deer Hunter (1978)

Nominated

- The Wind and the Lion (1975)
- King Kong (1976)
- Rocky (1976)
- Meteor (1979)
