= Peter Sutton (sound engineer) =

British sound engineer

- Born: 23 April 1943; Newcastle Upon Tyne, England
- Died: 24 August 2008 (aged 65)
- Occupation: Sound engineer
- Years active: 1969–1999

Peter Sutton (23 April 1943 – 24 August 2008) was a British sound engineer. He won an Oscar for Best Sound for the film The Empire Strikes Back.

== Selected filmography ==
- Shaft in Africa (1973)
- The Return of the Pink Panther (1975)
- The Empire Strikes Back (1980)
- The Great Muppet Caper (1981)
- The Dark Crystal (1982)
- The Beatles: Get Back (2021) (original film sound recordist)
