= Mel Metcalfe =

American sound engineer

- Occupation: Sound engineer
- Years active: 1981–2004

Mel Metcalfe is an American sound engineer. He has been nominated for an Academy Award in the Best Sound category three times: in 1987, for Star Trek IV: The Voyage Home; in 1992, for Beauty and the Beast; and in 1993, for Aladdin.

== Notable work ==
- Star Trek IV: The Voyage Home (1986)
- Rain Man (1988)
- The Little Mermaid (1989)
- The Rescuers Down Under (1990)
- Beauty and the Beast (1991)
- Aladdin (1992)
- Homeward Bound: The Incredible Journey (1993)
- The Three Musketeers (1993)
- The Lion King (1994)
- Houseguest (1995)
- A Goofy Movie (1995)
- A Pyromaniac's Love Story (1995)
- Pocahontas (1995)
- Operation Dumbo Drop (1995)
- Father of the Bride Part II (1995)
- Mr. Holland's Opus (1995)
- Homeward Bound II: Lost in San Francisco (1996)
- Eddie (1996)
- The Hunchback of Notre Dame (1996)
- 2 Days in the Valley (1996)
- 101 Dalmatians (1996)
- Metro (1997)
- Anna Karenina (1997)
- George of the Jungle (1997)
- Rocket Man (1997)
- Flubber (1997)
- Mr. Magoo (1997)
- Mulan (1998)
- Holy Man (1998)
- 10 Things I Hate About You (1999)
- Instinct (1999)
- Inspector Gadget (1999)
- Teaching Mrs. Tingle (1999)
- Music of the Heart (1999)
- Dinosaur (2000)
- Disney's The Kid (2000)
- The Emperor's New Groove (2000)
- The Majestic (2001)
- Lilo & Stitch (2002)
- The Santa Clause 2 (2002)
- Treasure Planet (2002)
- Home on the Range (2004)
