= Gary Alexander (sound engineer) =

American sound engineer

- Occupation: Sound engineer
- Years active: 1976–2011

Gary Alexander is an American sound engineer. He won the Academy Award for Best Sound for the film Out of Africa. He worked on over 300 films from 1976 to 2011.

== Selected filmography ==
- Out of Africa (1985)
