= Rick Hart (sound engineer) =

American sound engineer

- Occupation: Sound engineer
- Years active: 1988-2006

Rick Hart is an American sound engineer. He was nominated for an Academy Award in the category Best Sound for the film Under Siege. He has worked on more than 70 films since 1988.

== Selected filmography ==
- Under Siege (1992)
