= Joe Foglia =

American sound mixer

Joe Foglia is an American sound mixer. He has worked on both movies and albums, including Black Sabbath's Heaven and Hell. He began working in the film industry with the movie Miami Vice, which resulted in an Emmy nomination for sound mixing.

Since Miami Vice he has worked on multiple movies and television shows, including Scrubs, where he won an Emmy award for his work on "My Musical", and was nominated three times for an Emmy award for sound mixing on the HBO miniseries From the Earth to the Moon.
