= Strange Journey: The Story of Rocky Horror =

2025 documentary film

- Theatrical release poster
- Directed by: Linus O'Brien
- Written by: Avner Shiloah
- Produced by: Linus O'Brien; Adam Gibbs; Garret Price; Avner Shiloah
- Starring: Tim Curry; Susan Sarandon; Richard O'Brien; Jack Black; Trixie Mattel
- Cinematography: Warren Kommers
- Edited by: Avner Shiloah
- Music by: Giosuè Greco
- Production company: Margot Station
- Release dates: March 9, 2025 (SXSW); September 26, 2025
- Running time: 90 minutes
- Country: United States
- Language: English
- Box office: $141,442

Strange Journey: The Story of Rocky Horror is a 2025 American documentary film about the 1975 musical film The Rocky Horror Picture Show, which became a cultural phenomenon. The documentary is produced and directed by Linus O'Brien, the son of Rocky Horror writer Richard O'Brien. It premiered at the 2025 South by Southwest Film & TV Festival and was released on September 26, 2025.

== Reception ==
=== Critical response ===
On the review aggregator website Rotten Tomatoes, 98% of 44 critics' reviews are positive, with an average rating of 8.4/10. Metacritic, which uses a weighted average, assigned the film a score of 68 out of 100, based on six critics, indicating "generally favorable" reviews.

Zachary Lee of RogerEbert.com wrote, "Spaces of transgression and safety have never been more important (or in scarce supply) than now, and at its best, Strange Journey: The Story of Rocky Horror offers that same playground for its viewers to experience."

Wilson Chapman of IndieWire wrote, "Anyone who lives, breathes, and bleeds Rocky Horror will find comfort in Strange Journey and its celebration of the musical's enduring legacy."

Daniel Fienberg of The Hollywood Reporter wrote, "At the end of the documentary, Richard O'Brien reflects on his realization over the years that Rocky Horror hasn't truly belonged to him for years. It belongs, he says, to the fans, and Strange Journey is a record they'll be pleased to have."

=== Accolades ===
The film was nominated for Best First Documentary Feature at the 10th Critics' Choice Documentary Awards.
