= Mark Paterson (sound engineer) =

British sound engineer

- Occupation: Sound Engineer
- Years active: 2004–present

Mark Paterson is a British sound engineer. In 2013, Paterson won the Academy Award for Best Sound Mixing at the 85th Academy Awards for his work on Les Misérables. He has worked on more than 120 films since 2004.

== Selected filmography ==
- Les Misérables (2012)
