= Paul Hamblin =

British sound engineer

- Occupation: Sound engineer
- Years active: 1983-present

Paul Hamblin is a British sound engineer. He was nominated for an Academy Award in the category Best Sound Mixing for the film The King's Speech. He has worked on over 120 films since 1983.

== Selected filmography ==
- The King's Speech (2010)
