= Russell Williams II =

American production sound mixer

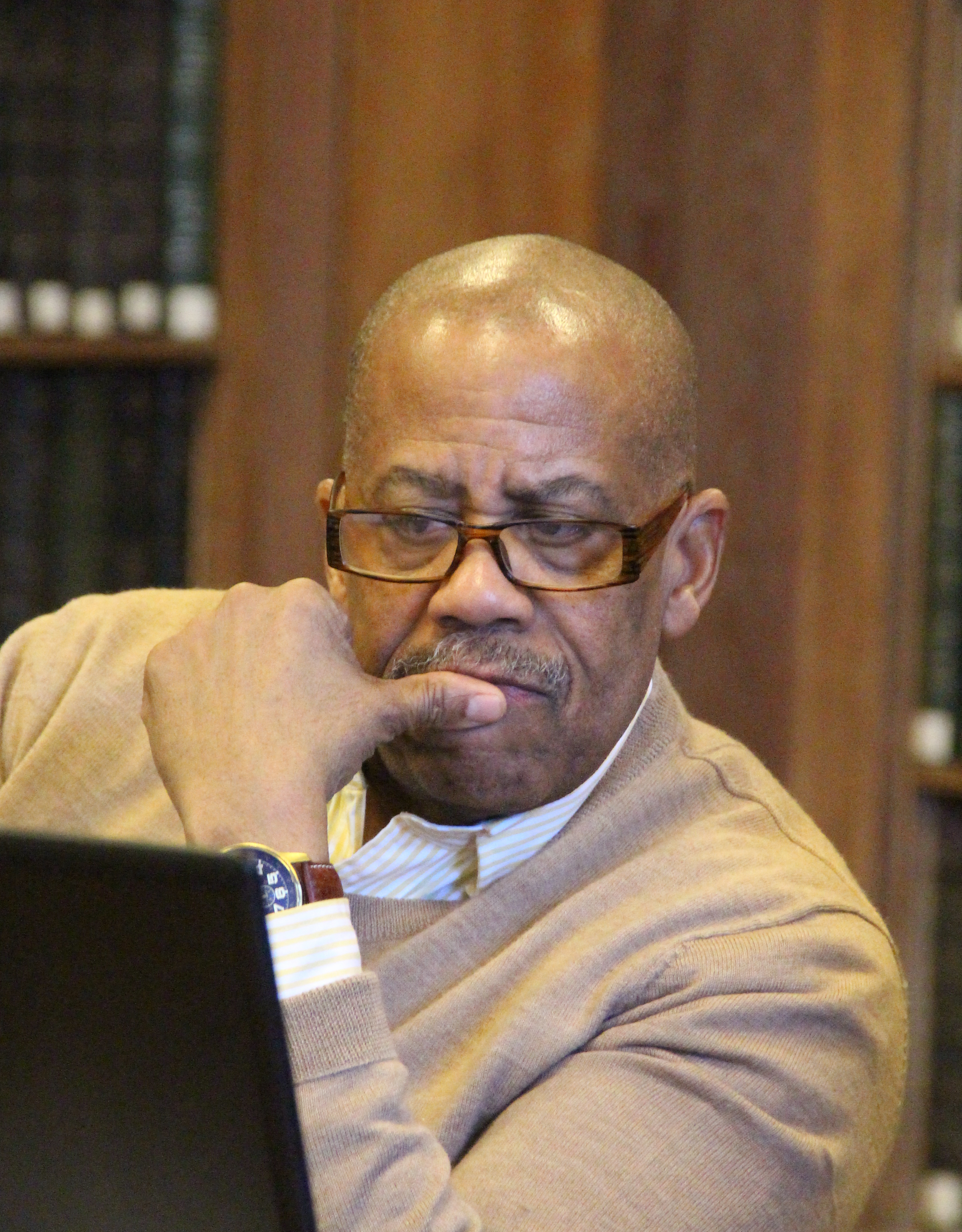
- Born: October 14, 1952 (age 73); Washington D.C. United States
- Occupation: Sound mixer
- Years active: 1976-2006
- Spouse(s): Patrice (1982-1986), Renee Leggett Williams (1990-1994), Rosalind Brown Williams (2004-present)

Russell Williams II (born October 14, 1952) is an American production sound mixer. He has won two Academy Awards for Best Sound. He has worked on more than 50 films since 1976. He is Distinguished Artist in Residence Emeritus at the American University School of Communication in Washington, DC.

== Selected filmography ==
- Training Day (2001)
- Dances with Wolves (1990)
- Glory (1989)
- Field of Dreams (1989)

== Awards ==
- Academy Awards: 1989 (Glory) and 1990 (Dances With Wolves)
- Prime Time Emmys: 1988 (Terrorist on Trial: The United States vs. Salim Ajami) and 1998 (12 Angry Men)
