= Tim Cooney (sound engineer) =

American sound mixer, animal trainer and musician

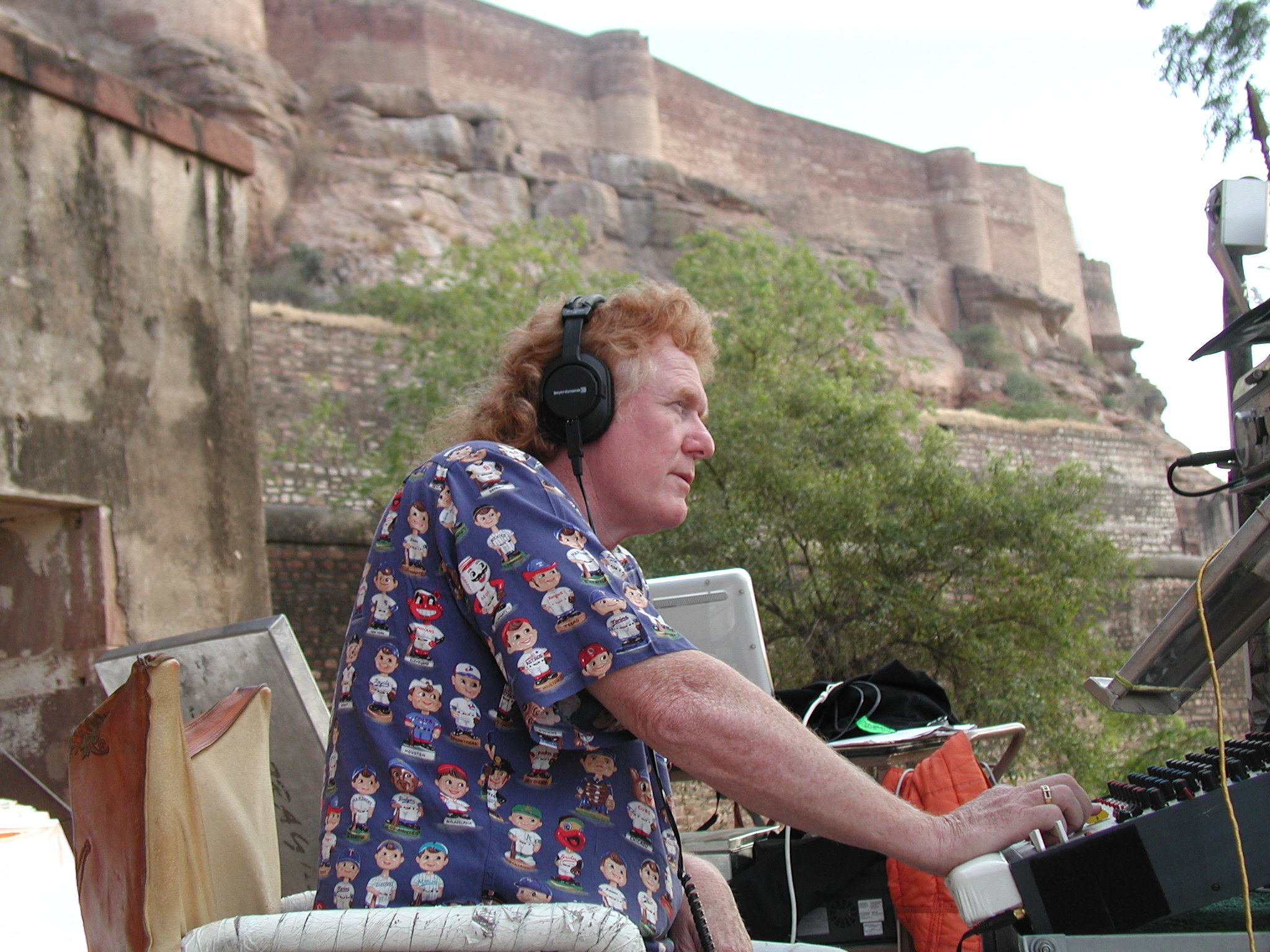
- Cooney mixing during a show
- Born: June 14, 1951 (age 74); Glendale, California, United States
- Occupations: Sound engineer, exotic animal trainer, musician, writer
- Years active: 1979 – retired in 2011

Tim Cooney (born June 14, 1951 in Glendale, California) is an American film production sound mixer, animal trainer and musician.

== Early life and career ==
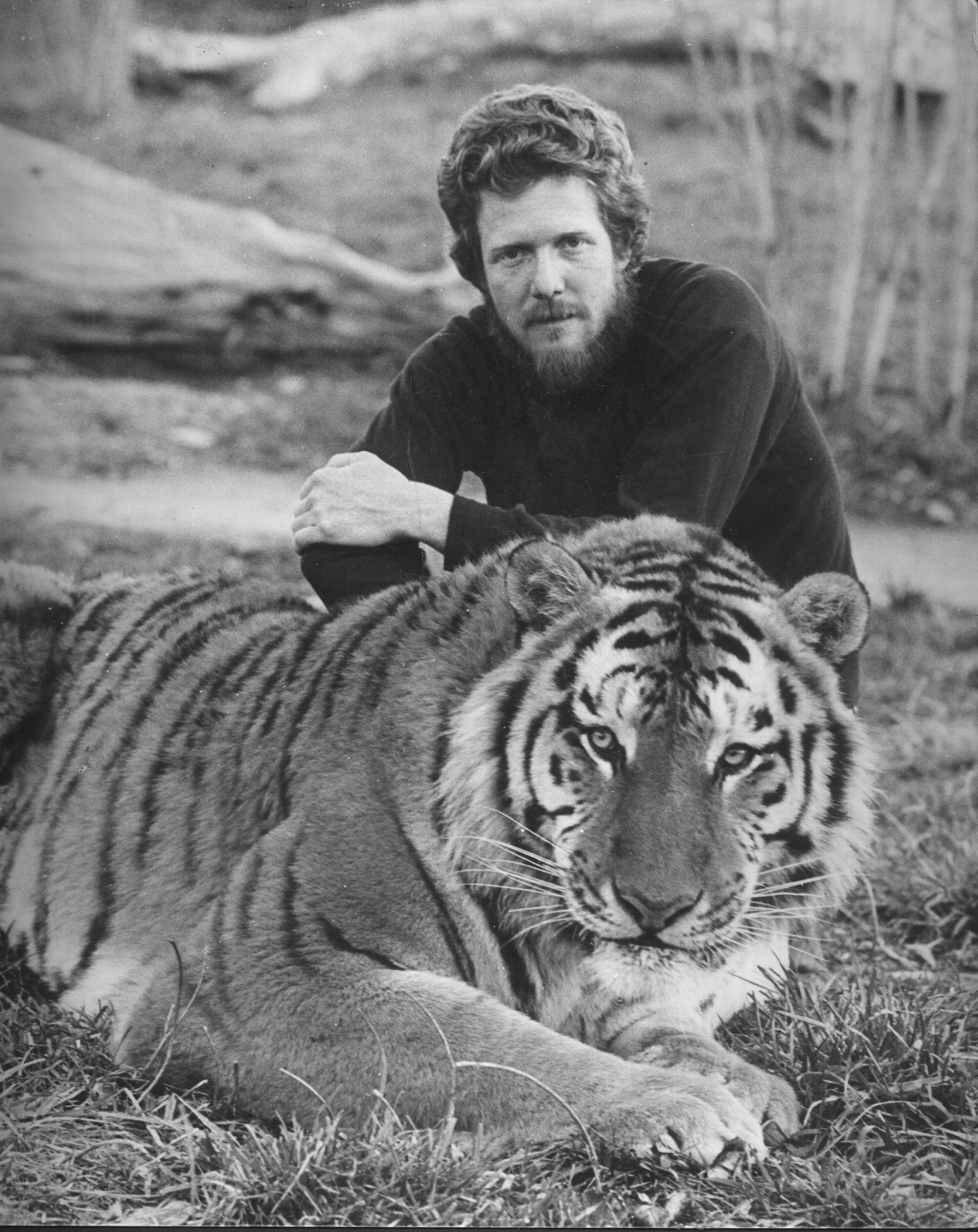
Cooney and his tiger Gregory

Cooney was born in Glendale, California but then later moved to West Virginia. At a young age, pursuing his desire to be musician, he joined a bluegrass band called the Canfields, playing guitar.

After graduating from the Ringling Bros. and Barnum & Bailey Clown College, he worked as a clown for Circus Vargas for a year but decided he wanted to train animals. He trained animals for circuses, the St. Louis Zoo, and then the film business.

== Film industry ==
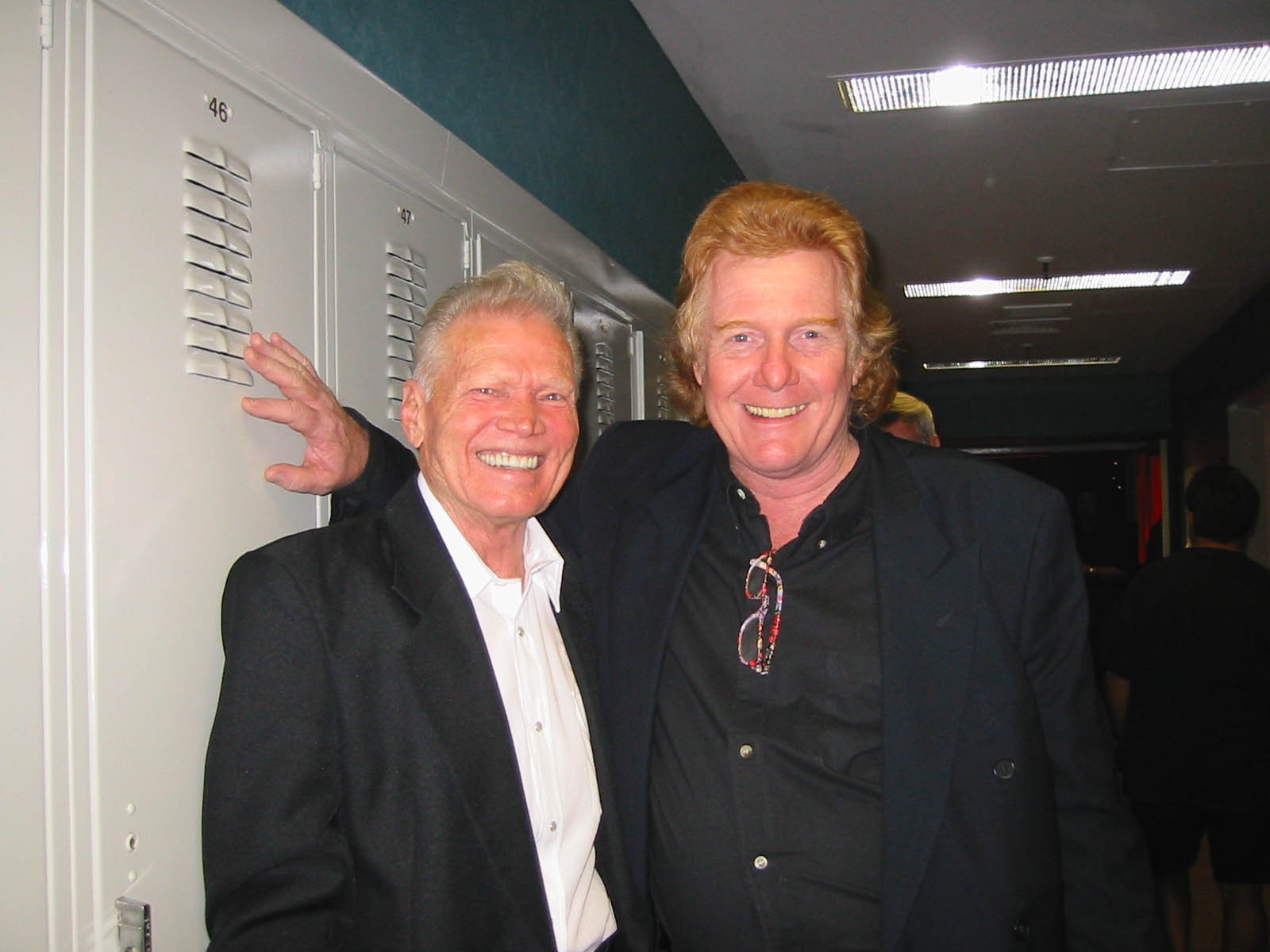
Cooney and Vassar Clements at the Grand ole Oprey

In 1976, Cooney started working as a boom man on the motion picture Roar considered to be the most dangerous film ever made then at Universal Studios. His first studio picture as production mixer was Blue Thunder for Columbia Pictures in 1981. Cooney was the first production mixer in history to have sound on his own web page. He had several animated items on his page as well, which had not been done at the time. The page has been taken down since his retirement. Cooney sat twice on the board of directors of the Cinema Audio Society is still a member of the motion picture academy of arts and sciences and the television academy of arts and sciences. Cooney was a producer on the movie the November Conspiracy. He also directed a few music videos, the most notable "About Love" with the singer Johnny Rivers. But one of his biggest works is for the movie Cliffhanger where he was nominated for an Academy Award.

== Awards and nominations ==
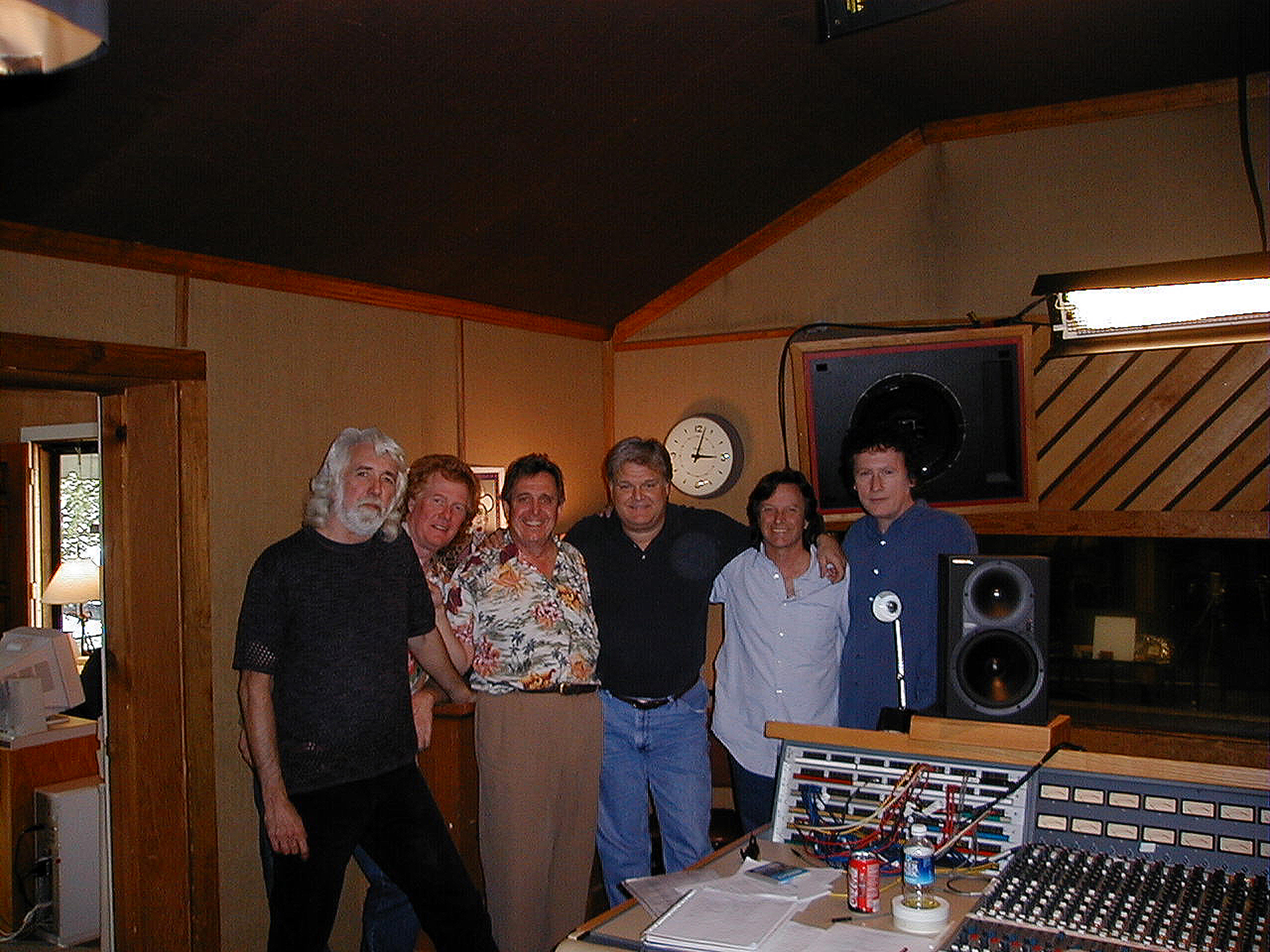
Cooney in the studio with (left to right) John McEuen, Cooney, Rodney Dillard, Ricky Scaggs, Jeff Hanna and Randy Scruggs

Cooney has received nominations for various awards that include an Academy Award nomination for Best Sound for Cliffhanger, three Emmys nominations, two Cinema Audio Society nominations For Outstanding Achievement In Sound Mixing and three Golden Reel Award nominations. Cooney won the Golden Reel for best sound in 2000 and wrote a book entitled, Work in movies? Are you crazy? FILMOGRAPHY

2014 Something Wicked (sound mixer)[3]
2010 The Event (TV Series) (sound mixer )
2010 Secretariat (sound mixer) 
2009-2010 Community (production sound mixer) 
2009 Bring It On: Fight to the Finish (Video) (production sound mixer) 
2008 Sons of Anarchy (TV Series) (production sound mixer) 
2008 The Shield (TV Series) (production sound mixer) 
2007 Three Days to Vegas (production sound mixer) 
2007 Raines (TV Series) (sound mixer) 
2006 One Night with the King (sound mixer) 
2006 Glass House: The Good Mother (Video) (sound mixer) 
2005 Commander in Chief (production sound mixer - 2 episodes) 
2005 Beauty Shop (production sound mixer) 
2004 Paparazzi (sound mixer) 
2004 The Punisher (sound mixer) 
2003 Timeline (sound mixer) 
2003 Birds of Prey (TV Series) (sound mixer)
2002 We Were Soldiers (sound mixer) 
2002 The Salton Sea (production sound mixer) 
2001 Joy Ride (sound mixer) 
2001 Dinner with Friends (production sound mixer) 
2000 Noriega: God's Favorite (TV Movie) (production sound mixer) 
1999 The Strip (TV Series) (sound) 
1999 Deep Blue Sea (production sound mixer) 
1998 World Upon Her Shoulder (Short) (sound mixer) 
1998 The Last Days (Documentary) (production sound mixer) 
1998 Lethal Weapon 4 (production sound mixer) 
1997 Buffalo Soldiers (TV Movie) (sound - uncredited) 
1997 Conspiracy Theory (production sound mixer) 
1997 Gone Fishin' (sound mixer) 
1997 Hollywood Confidential (TV Movie) (sound mixer) 
1996 D3: The Mighty Ducks (sound mixer) 
1995 Bushwhacked (sound mixer) 
1994 Twilight Zone: Rod Serling's Lost Classics (TV Movie) (sound mixer) 
1993 South of Sunset (TV Series) (sound mixer ) 
1993 Demolition Man (sound mixer) 
1993 Cliffhanger (production sound mixer) 
1991 Session Man (Short) (sound mixer) 
1991 The Marrying Man (production sound mixer) 
1991 Hell Hath No Fury (TV Movie) (sound mixer) 
1990 The Adventures of Ford Fairlane (sound mixer) 
1990 Die Hard 2 (sound mixer) 
1989 Nick Knight (TV Movie) (sound mixer) 
1985-1989  Murder, She Wrote (production sound mixer) 
1988 I Saw What You Did (TV Movie) (sound mixer) 
1983 Blue Thunder (production sound mixer) 
1983 Sweet Sixteen (sound) 
1981 Whose Life Is It Anyway? (boom operator - uncredited) 
1981 Roar (boom operator) 
1979 Tourist Trap (boom operator)
