= Chris Carpenter (sound engineer) =

American sound engineer

- Occupation: Sound engineer
- Years active: 1979–present

Chris Carpenter is an American sound engineer. He has been nominated for 3 Academy Awards in the category Best Sound. He has worked on more than 130 films since 1979.

== Selected filmography ==
- Geronimo: An American Legend (1993)
- Independence Day (1996)
- The Mummy (1999)
