= Nelson Stoll =

American sound engineer

- Occupation: Sound engineer
- Years active: 1970-present

Nelson Stoll is an American sound engineer. He has been nominated for two Academy Awards in the category Best Sound. He has worked on over 60 films since 1970.

== Selected filmography ==
- Dune (1984)
- Total Recall (1990)
