= Scott R. Lewis =

American sound engineer

- Occupation: Re-Recording Mixer

Scott R. Lewis is an American sound engineer. He won a Primetime Emmy Award for his Sound Mixing work on the political thriller television series House of Cards in 2014. His win was shared with Lorenzo Millan and Nathan Nance. He has also been nominated for Emmy Awards on seven other occasions.
