= Tony Lamberti =

American sound engineer

- Occupation: Sound engineer
- Years active: 1991–present

Tony Lamberti is an American sound engineer. He was nominated for an Academy Award in the category Best Sound Mixing for the film Inglourious Basterds. He has worked on more than 140 films since 1991.

== Selected filmography ==
- Revolutionary Road (2008)
- Inglourious Basterds (2009)
- Eat Pray Love (2010)
- RED (2010)
- Django Unchained (2012)
- Spider-Man: Homecoming (2017)
- Green Book (2018)
- Spider-Man: Into the Spider-Verse (2018)
- Spider-Man: Far from Home (2019)
- Spider-Man: No Way Home (2021)
