= Leslie Shatz =

American sound engineer

- Occupation: Sound engineer
- Years active: 1971–present

Leslie Shatz is an American sound engineer. He was co-nominated for an Academy Award in the category Best Sound for the film The Mummy. He has worked on more than 180 films since 1971.

== Selected filmography ==
- Milk
- Twilight
- Wendy and Lucy
- The Assassination of Jesse James by the Coward Robert Ford (2007)
- I'm Not There (2007)
- Paranoid Park (2007)
- Sahara (2005)
- Around the World in 80 Days
- Hidalgo (2004)
- Van Helsing (2004)
- Elephant (2003)
- The Count of Monte Cristo (2002)
- Far from Heaven (2002)
- The Mummy Returns (2001)
- Finding Forrester (2000)
- In Dreams (1999)
- The Mummy (1999)
- Alien: Resurrection (1997)
- Good Will Hunting (1997)
- Scream (1996)
- Johnny Mnemonic (1995)
- Judge Dredd (1995)
- Bram Stoker's Dracula (1992)
- Rambling Rose (1991)
- Ghost (1990)
- Henry & June' (1990)
- The War of the Roses (1989)
- The Journey of Natty Gann (1985)
- Remo Williams: The Adventure Begins (1985)
