= David J. Hudson =

American sound engineer (1943–2011)

- Born: David James Hudson; December 16, 1943
- Died: May 21, 2011 (aged 67); Palo Verde, California, U.S.
- Occupation: Sound engineer
- Years active: 1980-1998

David James Hudson (December 16, 1943 – May 21, 2011) was an American sound engineer. He was nominated for three Academy Awards in the category Best Sound.

== Selected filmography ==
- Star Trek IV: The Voyage Home (1986)
- Beauty and the Beast (1991)
- Aladdin (1992)
