= Larry Stensvold =

American sound engineer

- Occupation: Sound engineer
- Years active: 1980 – present

Larry Stensvold is an American sound engineer. He won the Oscar for Best Sound for the film Out of Africa. He has worked on more than 150 films since 1980.

In addition to his Oscar, he has been nominated for three Emmy Awards as well for sound.

== Selected filmography ==
- Out of Africa (1985)
