= Lora Hirschberg =

American sound engineer (born 1963)

- Born: 1963 (age 62–63); Olmsted Falls, Ohio, U.S.
- Occupation: Sound engineer
- Years active: 1990–present

Lora Hirschberg (born 1963) is an American sound engineer. She won the Academy Award for Best Sound Mixing for the film Inception and was previously nominated for the same award for the film The Dark Knight. She has worked on more than 110 films since 1990.

== Biography ==
Hirschberg was born near Cleveland, Ohio, in the city of Olmsted Falls, and attended New York University's film school. She worked in film sound in New York after graduation, having been hired by the film production company American Zoetrope in 1989. She started her career in the company's central machine room and later relocated to San Francisco, California. She is lesbian.

== Selected filmography ==
Hirschberg has won an Academy Award and has been nominated for another:

Won

- Inception (2010)

Nominated

- The Dark Knight (2008)
