= Cinema Audio Society Awards =

Annual awards for sound mixing

The Cinema Audio Society Awards are an annual awards ceremony given by the Cinema Audio Society that honor outstanding achievements in sound mixing. These awards have been presented by the Cinema Audio Society since 1994.

The competition is open to feature films and television programs released or aired during the calendar year. The winners are revealed in a sealed envelope ceremony during the Cinema Audio Society awards banquet the following spring. Winners are selected entirely by a written balloting of the C.A.S. active members.

The awards also include a Filmmaker Award, Career Achievement Honoree, a Student Recognition Award and Technical Achievement Award.

== Category ==
=== Film ===
- Outstanding Achievement in Sound Mixing for a Motion Picture – Live Action
- Outstanding Achievement in Sound Mixing for a Motion Picture – Animated
- Outstanding Achievement in Sound Mixing for a Motion Picture – Documentary

=== Television ===
- Outstanding Achievement in Sound Mixing for Television Series – One Hour
- Outstanding Achievement in Sound Mixing for Television Series – Half Hour
- Outstanding Achievement in Sound Mixing for Television Movie or Limited Series
- Outstanding Achievement in Sound Mixing for Television Non Fiction, Variety or Music – Series or Specials
