= 28th Satellite Awards =

2024 awards ceremony for film and television

- Date: March 3, 2024
- Site: West Hollywood, California

Highlights
- Most wins: Film: The Holdovers / Oppenheimer (4); Television: Yellowjackets (2)
- Most nominations: Film: Oppenheimer (13); Television: Succession (6)
- Best Motion Picture – Drama: Oppenheimer
- Best Motion Picture – Comedy or Musical: The Holdovers
- Best Television Series – Drama: The Last of Us
- Best Television Series – Comedy or Musical: Only Murders in the Building
- Best Miniseries & Limited Series or Motion Picture Made for Television: Fargo

The 28th Satellite Awards is an award ceremony honoring the year's outstanding performers, films and television shows, presented by the International Press Academy.

The nominations were announced on December 18, 2023. The winners were announced on March 3, 2024. The awards presentation took place at West Hollywood, California in Hollywood Boulevard.

Oppenheimer led the film nominations with thirteen, followed by Killers of the Flower Moon and Barbie with twelve and eleven, respectively. Succession received the most nominations for television with six. The special achievement award recipients were announced on February 14, 2024.

== Special achievement awards ==
- Auteur Award (for singular vision and unique artistic control over the elements of production) – Yorgos Lanthimos
- Honorary Satellite Award – Brooklyn Sudano
- Humanitarian Award (for making a difference in the lives of those in the artistic community and beyond) – Dennis Quaid
- Mary Pickford Award (for outstanding artistic contribution to the entertainment industry) – Jon Landau
- Nikola Tesla Award (for visionary achievement in filmmaking technology) – Neil Corbould
- Make-Up Award – Donald Mowat
- Stunt Performance Award – Kimberly Shannon Murphy
- Ensemble: Motion Picture – Oppenheimer
- Ensemble: Television – Succession

== Motion picture winners and nominees ==
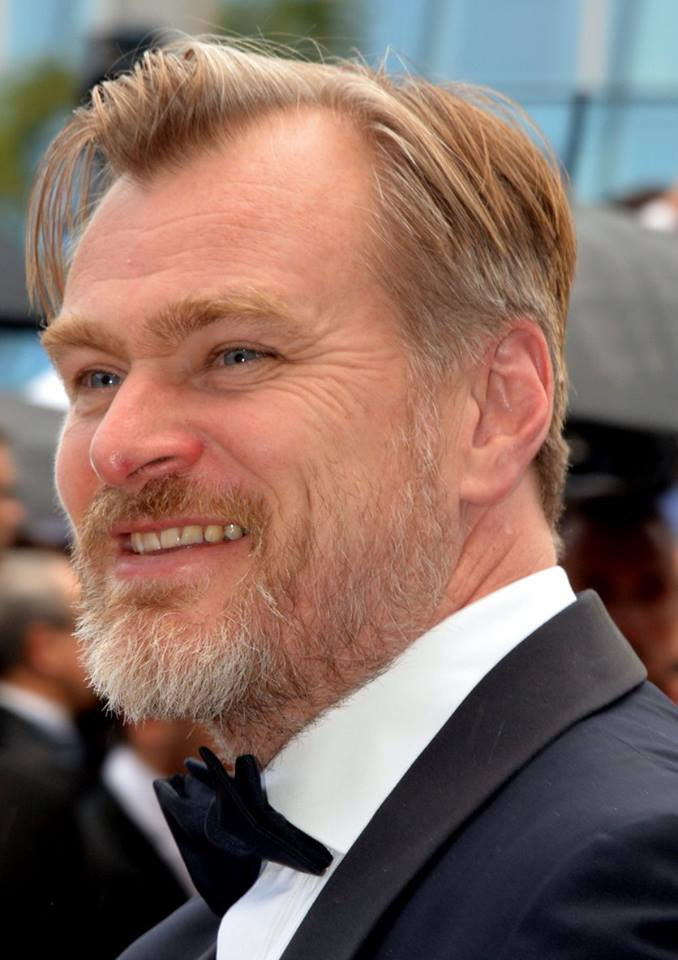
Christopher Nolan, Best Director winner

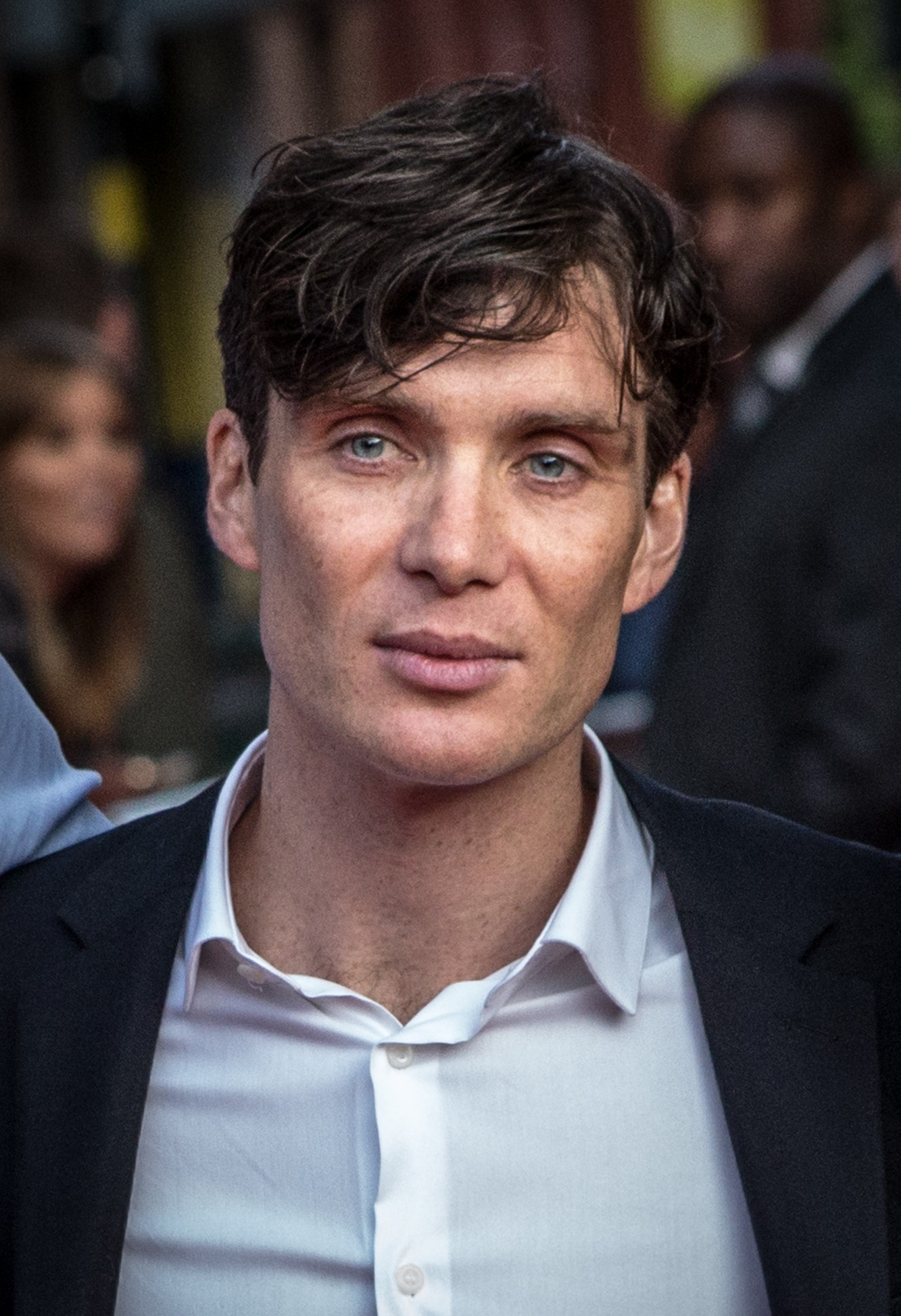
Cillian Murphy, Best Actor in a Motion Picture – Drama winner

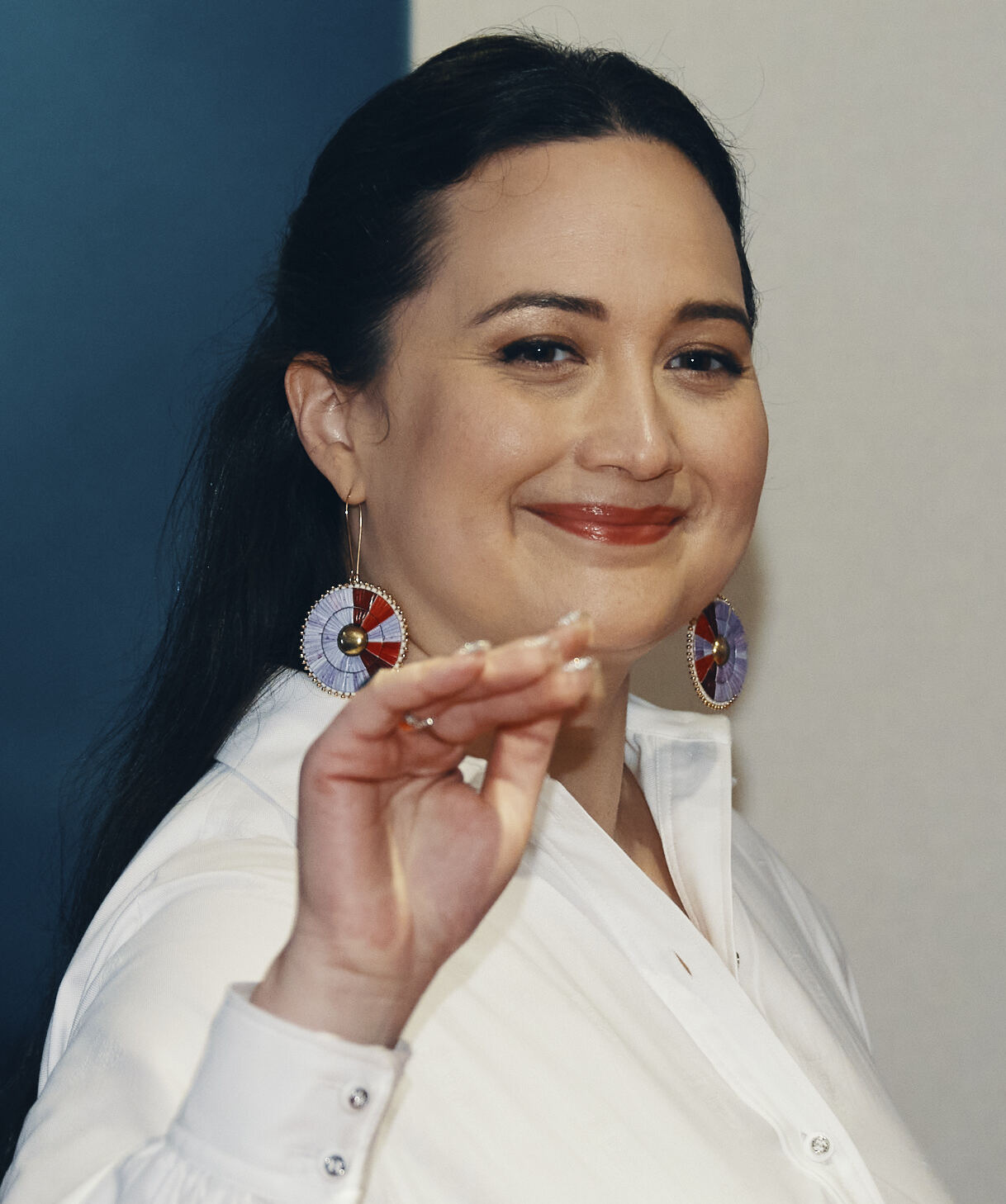
Lily Gladstone, Best Actress in a Motion Picture – Drama winner

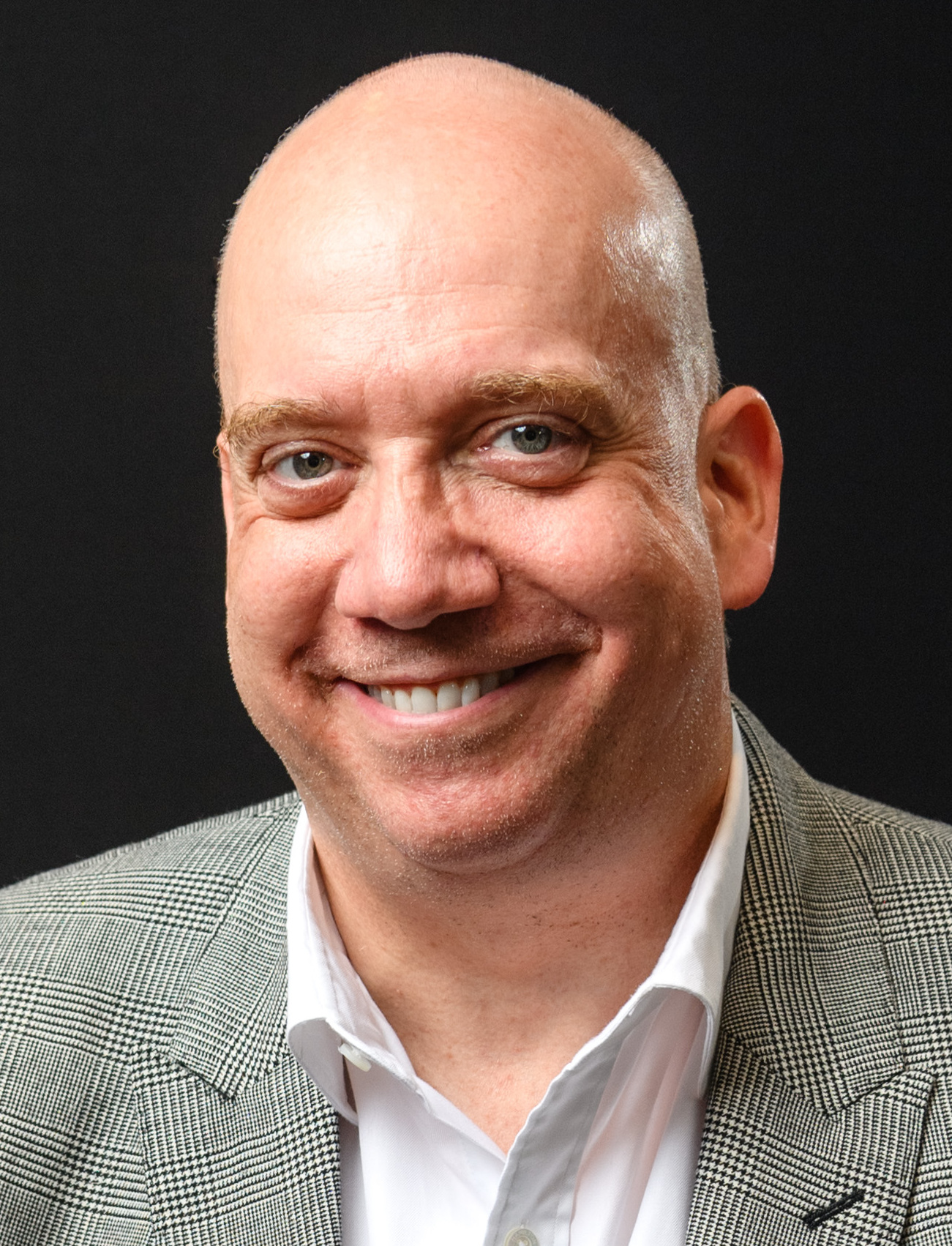
Paul Giamatti, Best Actor in a Motion Picture – Comedy or Musical winner

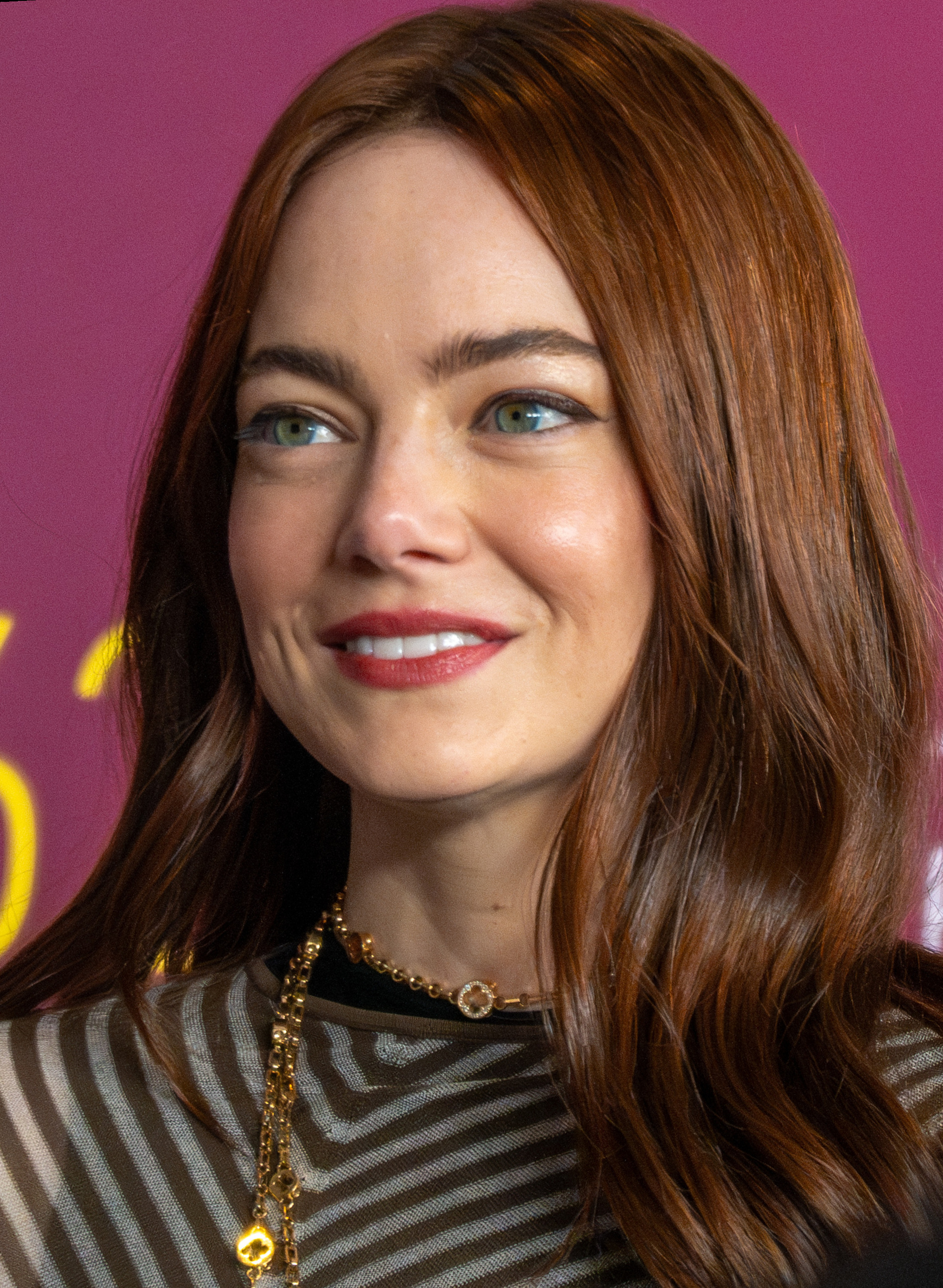
Emma Stone, Best Actress in a Motion Picture – Comedy or Musical winner

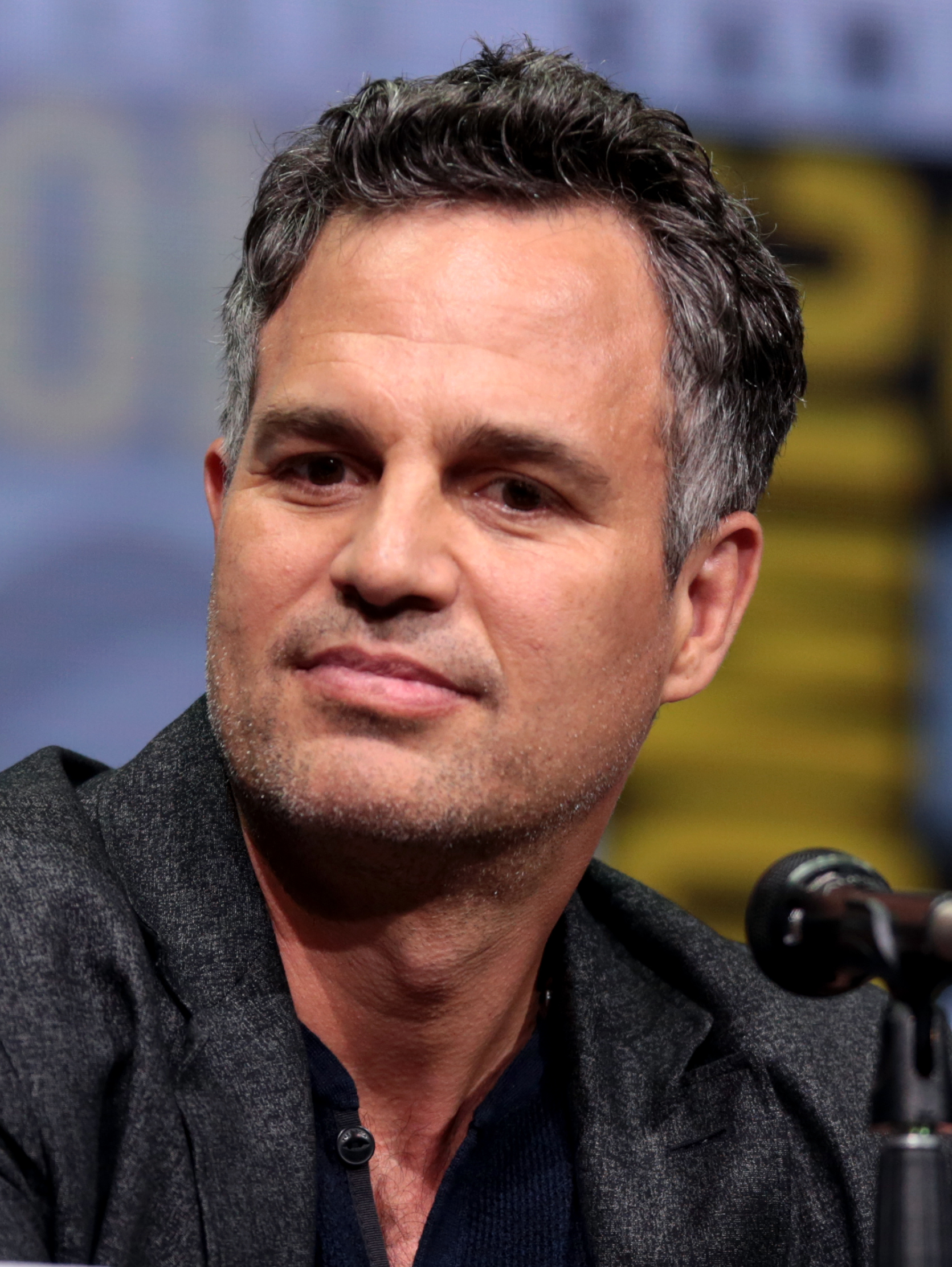
Mark Ruffalo, Best Actor in a Supporting Role winner

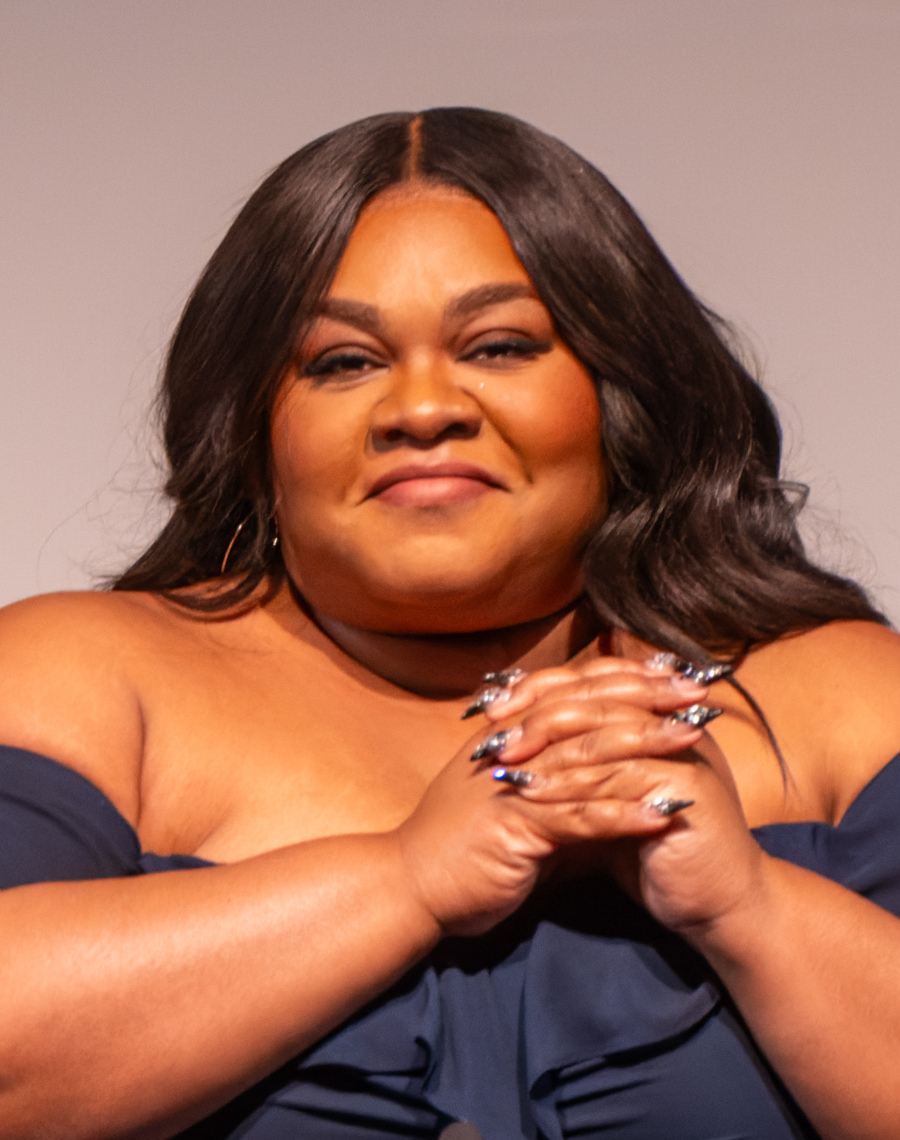
Da'Vine Joy Randolph, Best Actress in a Supporting Role winner

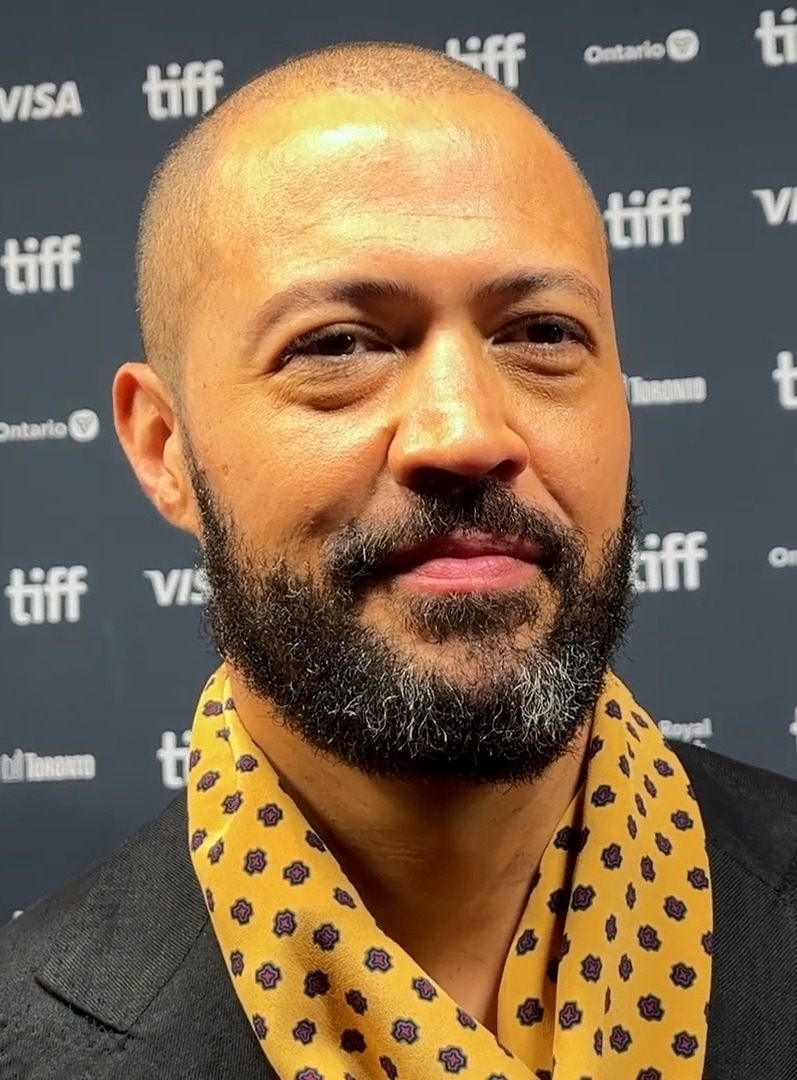
Cord Jefferson, Best Adapted Screenplay winner

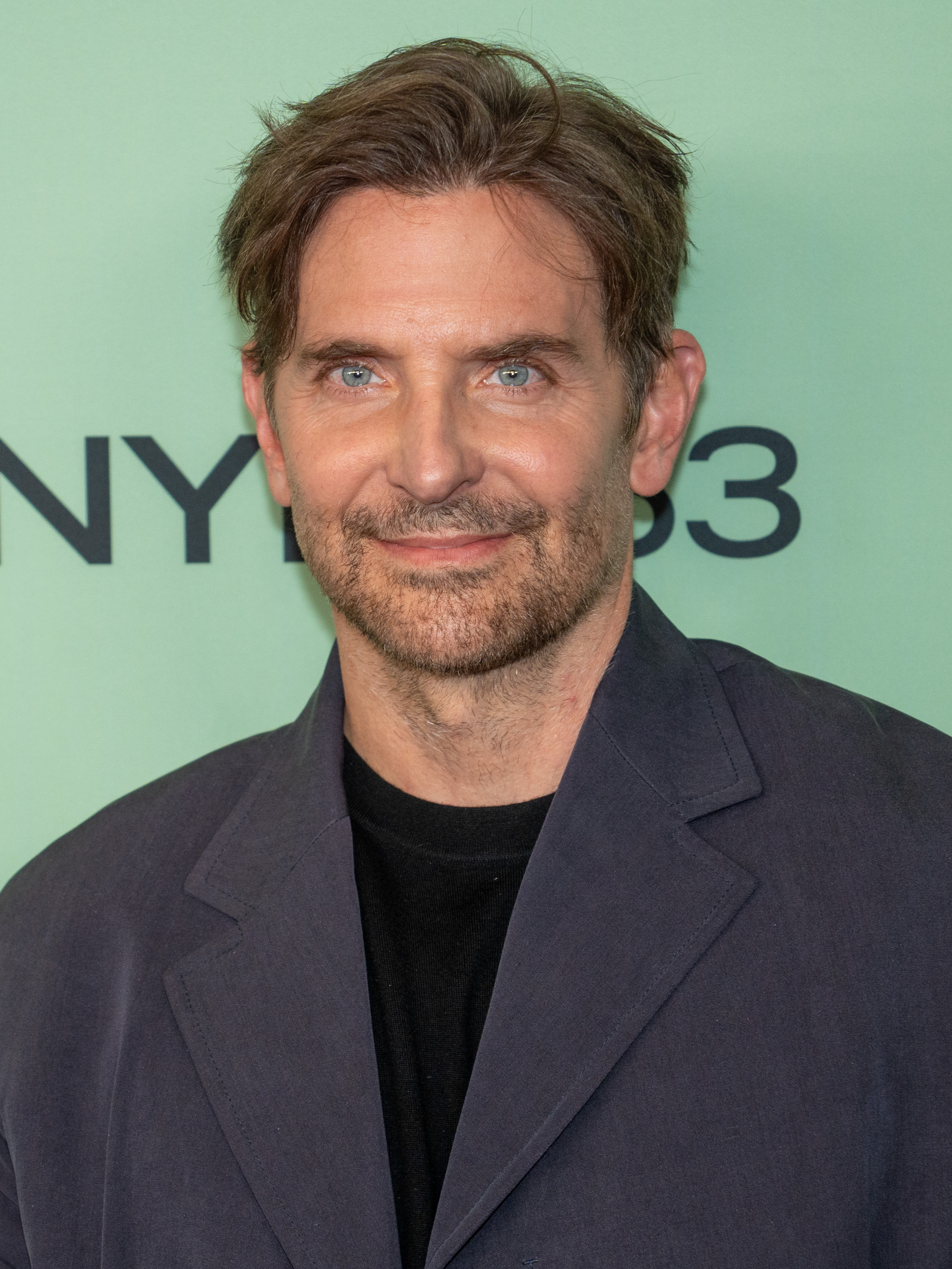
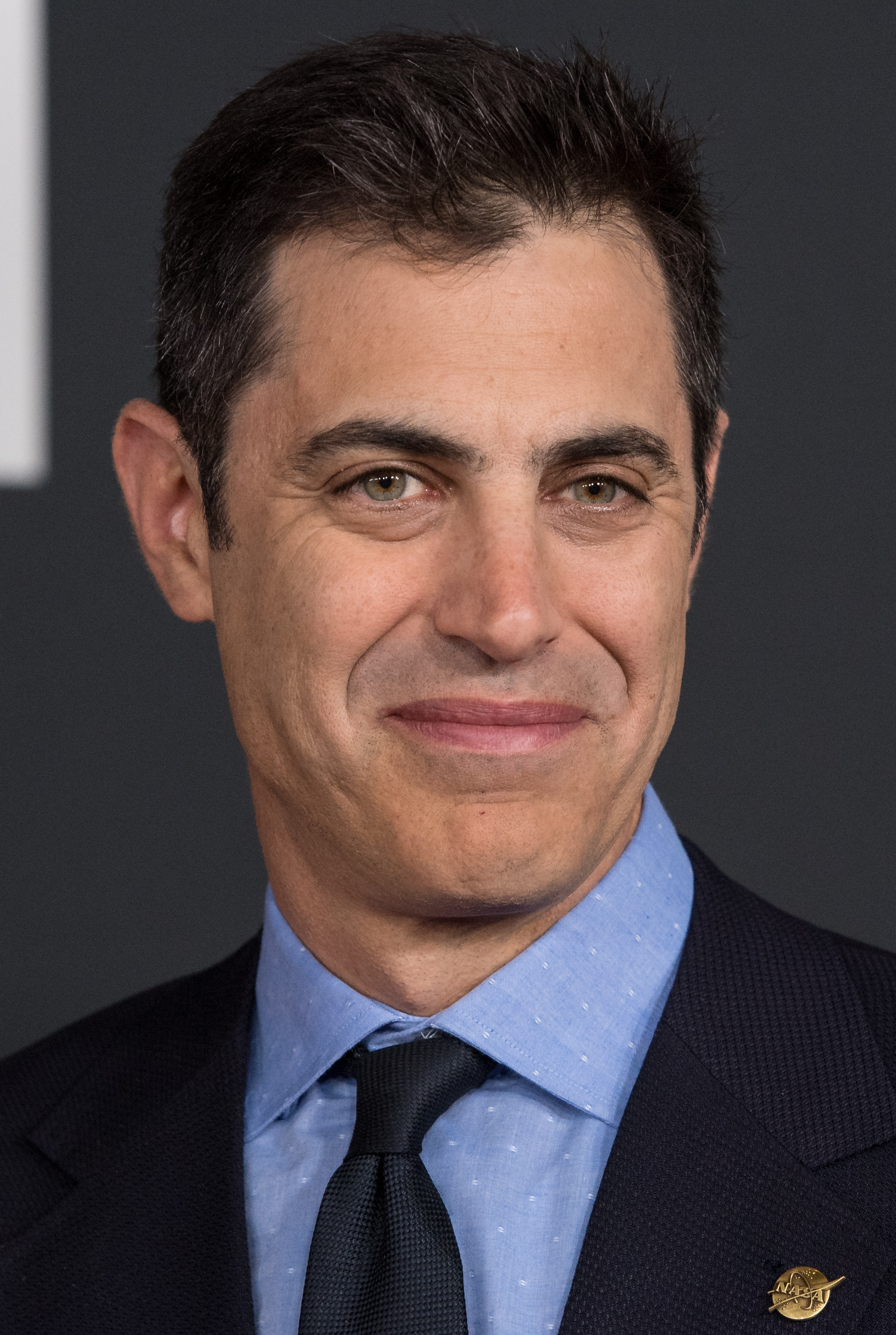
Bradley Cooper and Josh Singer, Best Original Screenplay winners
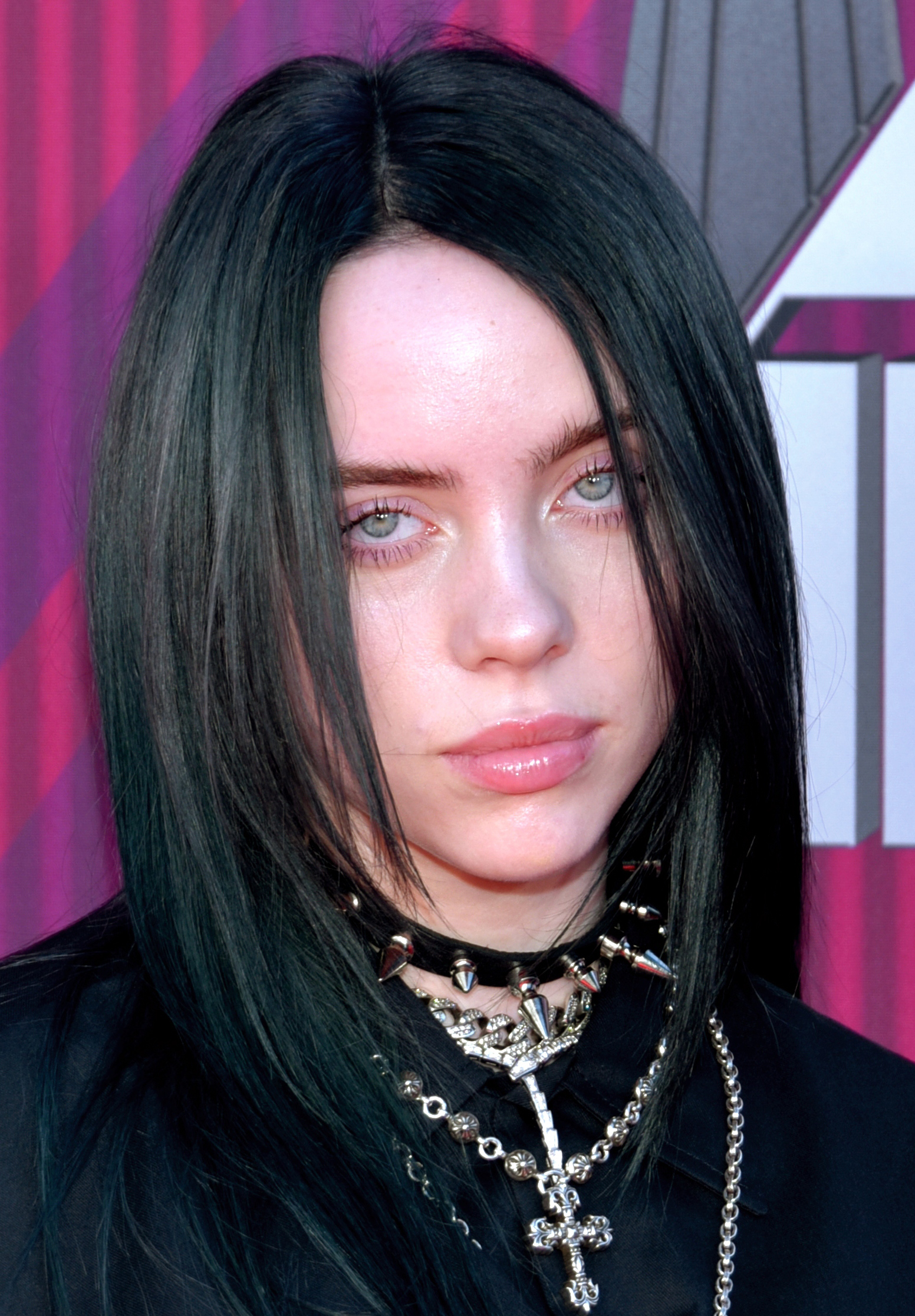
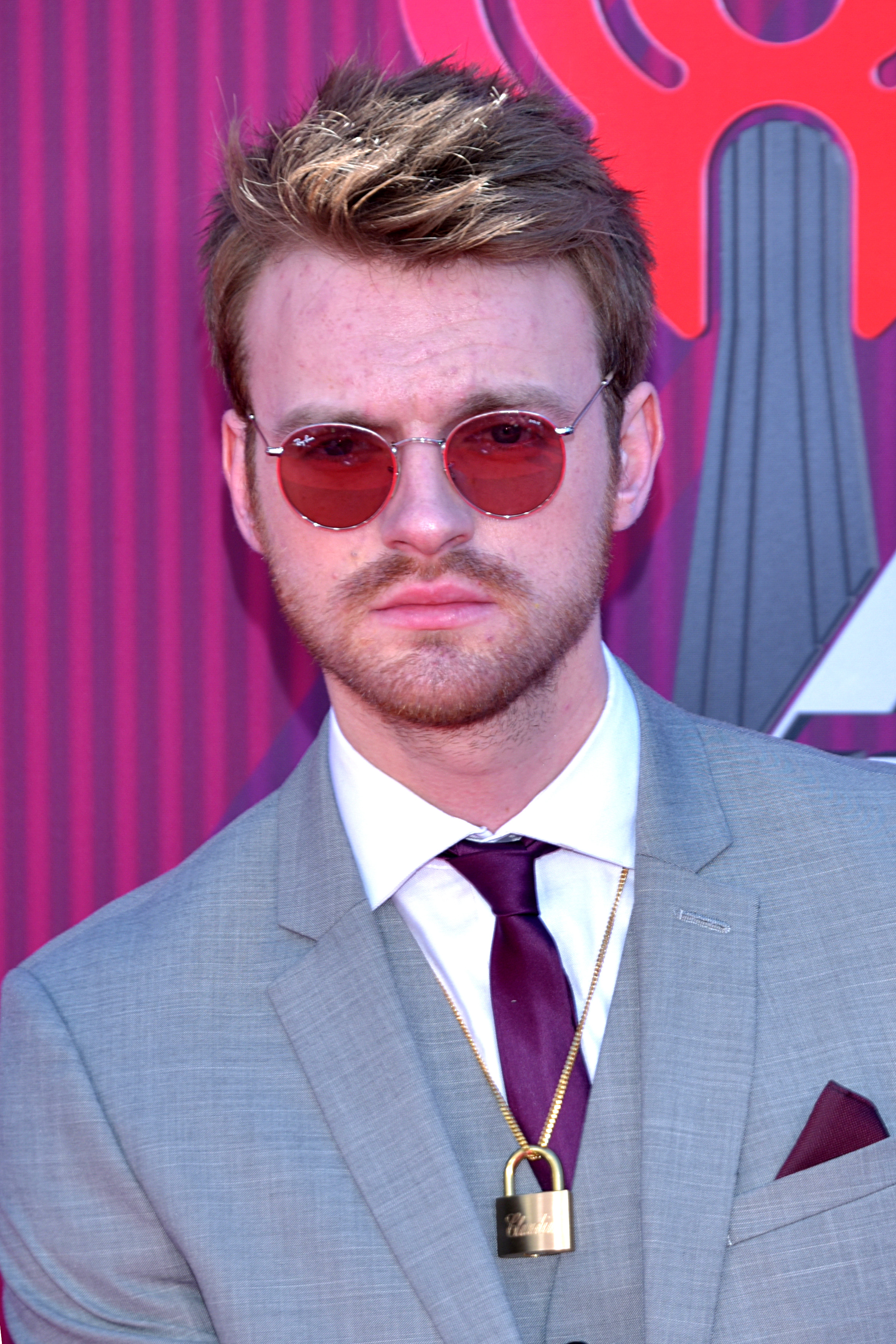
Billie Eilish and Finneas, Best Original Song winners

Winners are listed first and highlighted in bold.

Best Motion Picture – Drama	Best Motion Picture – Comedy or Musical
**Oppenheimer**; Ferrari; Killers of the Flower Moon; Maestro; May December; Past Lives	**The Holdovers**; American Fiction; Barbie; Dream Scenario; Poor Things; Scrapper
Best Motion Picture – Animated or Mixed Media	Best Director
**The Boy and the Heron**; Elemental; Robot Dreams; Spider-Man: Across the Spider-Verse; Suzume; Teenage Mutant Ninja Turtles: Mutant Mayhem	**Christopher Nolan – Oppenheimer**; Greta Gerwig – Barbie; Jonathan Glazer – The Zone of Interest; Yorgos Lanthimos – Poor Things; Alexander Payne – The Holdovers; Martin Scorsese – Killers of the Flower Moon
Best Actor in a Motion Picture – Drama	Best Actress in a Motion Picture – Drama
**Cillian Murphy – Oppenheimer as J. Robert Oppenheimer**; Bradley Cooper – Maestro as Leonard Bernstein; Leonardo DiCaprio – Killers of the Flower Moon as Ernest Burkhart; Colman Domingo – Rustin as Bayard Rustin; Franz Rogowski – Passages as Tomas Freiburg; Andrew Scott – All of Us Strangers as Adam	**Lily Gladstone – Killers of the Flower Moon as Mollie Burkhart**; Penélope Cruz – Ferrari as Laura Ferrari; Sandra Hüller – Anatomy of a Fall as Sandra Voyter; Greta Lee – Past Lives as Nora Moon; Carey Mulligan – Maestro as Felicia Montealegre; Natalie Portman – May December as Elizabeth Berry
Best Actor in a Motion Picture – Comedy or Musical	Best Actress in a Motion Picture – Comedy or Musical
**Paul Giamatti – The Holdovers as Paul Hunham**; Nicolas Cage – Dream Scenario as Paul Matthews; Barry Keoghan – Saltburn as Oliver Quick; Joaquin Phoenix – Beau Is Afraid as Beau Wassermann; Jeffrey Wright – American Fiction as Thelonious "Monk" Ellison	**Emma Stone – Poor Things as Bella Baxter**; Fantasia Barrino – The Color Purple as Celie Harris-Johnson; Alma Pöysti – Fallen Leaves as Ansa; Margot Robbie – Barbie as Barbie; Cailee Spaeny – Priscilla as Priscilla Presley
Best Actor in a Supporting Role	Best Actress in a Supporting Role
**Mark Ruffalo – Poor Things as Duncan Wedderburn**; Robert De Niro – Killers of the Flower Moon as William King Hale; Robert Downey Jr. – Oppenheimer as Lewis Strauss; Ryan Gosling – Barbie as Ken; Charles Melton – May December as Joe Yoo; Dominic Sessa – The Holdovers as Angus Tully	**Da'Vine Joy Randolph – The Holdovers as Mary Lamb**; Juliette Binoche – The Taste of Things as Eugénie; Emily Blunt – Oppenheimer as Kitty Oppenheimer; America Ferrera – Barbie as Gloria; Julianne Moore – May December as Gracie Atherton-Yoo; Rosamund Pike – Saltburn as Lady Elspeth Catton
Best Original Screenplay	Best Adapted Screenplay
**Maestro – Bradley Cooper and Josh Singer**; Anatomy of a Fall – Justine Triet and Arthur Harari; Barbie – Greta Gerwig and Noah Baumbach; The Holdovers – David Hemingson; May December – Samy Burch; Past Lives – Celine Song	**American Fiction – Cord Jefferson**; All of Us Strangers – Andrew Haigh; Killers of the Flower Moon – Eric Roth and Martin Scorsese; Oppenheimer – Christopher Nolan; Poor Things – Tony McNamara; The Zone of Interest – Jonathan Glazer
Best Motion Picture – Documentary	Best Motion Picture – International
**Bad Press**; 20 Days in Mariupol; American Symphony; Close to Vermeer; Lakota Nation vs. United States; Little Richard: I Am Everything; Love to Love You, Donna Summer; Stamped from the Beginning	**The Zone of Interest (United Kingdom)**; Anatomy of a Fall (France); Blaga's Lessons (Bulgaria); Fallen Leaves (Finland); Io capitano (Italy); Society of the Snow (Spain); The Teachers' Lounge (Germany)
Best Cinematography	Best Film Editing
**Maestro – Matthew Libatique**; Ferrari – Erik Messerschmidt; Killers of the Flower Moon – Rodrigo Prieto; Mission: Impossible – Dead Reckoning Part One – Fraser Taggart; Napoleon – Dariusz Wolski; Oppenheimer – Hoyte van Hoytema; Saltburn – Linus Sandgren	**The Holdovers – Kevin Tent**; Barbie – Nick Houy; Killers of the Flower Moon – Thelma Schoonmaker; Maestro – Michelle Tesoro; Oppenheimer – Jennifer Lame; Poor Things – Yorgos Mavropsaridis
Best Costume Design	Best Production Design
**Napoleon – David Crossman and Janty Yates**; Barbie – Jacqueline Durran; The Color Purple – Francine Jamison-Tanchuck; Killers of the Flower Moon – Jacqueline West; Oppenheimer – Ellen Mirojnick; Poor Things – Holly Waddington	**Barbie – Sarah Greenwood and Katie Spencer**; Ferrari – Maria Djurkovic and Sophie Phillips; Killers of the Flower Moon – Jack Fisk and Adam Willis; Maestro – Kevin Thompson and Rena DeAngelo; Napoleon – Arthur Max; Oppenheimer – Ruth De Jong and Claire Kaufman
Best Original Score	Best Original Song
**American Fiction – Laura Karpman**; Killers of the Flower Moon – Robbie Robertson (posthumous); Oppenheimer – Ludwig Göransson; Poor Things – Jerskin Fendrix; Society of the Snow – Michael Giacchino; Spider-Man: Across the Spider-Verse – Daniel Pemberton	**"What Was I Made For?" from Barbie – Billie Eilish and Finneas**; "The Fire Inside" from Flamin' Hot – Diane Warren; "I'm Just Ken" from Barbie – Mark Ronson and Andrew Wyatt; "It Never Went Away" from American Symphony – Jon Batiste and Dan Wilson; "Peaches" from The Super Mario Bros. Movie – Jack Black, Aaron Horvath, Michael Jelenic, Eric Osmond, and John Spiker; "Road to Freedom" from Rustin – Lenny Kravitz
Best Sound (Editing and Mixing)	Best Visual Effects
**Maestro – Richard King, Steven A. Morrow, Tom Ozanich, Jason Ruder, and Dean A. Zupancic**; American Symphony – Tristan Baylis, Ryan Collison, Tom Paul, Matt Snedecor, and William Tzouris; Ferrari – Tony Lamberti, Andy Nelson, Lee Orloff, and Bernard Weiser; Killers of the Flower Moon – Tod A. Maitland, John Pritchett, Philip Stockton, and Mark Ulano; Napoleon – James Harrison, Paul Massey, William Miller, Oliver Tarney, and Rachael Tate; Oppenheimer – Willie D. Burton, Richard King, Kevin O'Connell, and Gary A. Rizzo	**Mission: Impossible – Dead Reckoning Part One – Simone Coco, Neil Corbould, Jeff Sutherland, and Alex Wuttke**; The Creator – Jay Cooper, Ian Comley, Neil Corbould, and Andrew Roberts; Napoleon – Henry Badgett, Simone Coco, Neil Corbould, Charley Henley, and Luc-Ewen Martin-Fenouillet; Oppenheimer – Dave Drzewiecki, Scott R. Fisher, Andrew Jackson, and Giacomo Mineo; Spider-Man: Across the Spider-Verse – Bret St. Clair, Pav Grochola, Alan Hawkins, and Michael Lasker; Transformers: Rise of the Beasts – Matt Aitken, Gary Brozenich, Ilya Churinov, Richard Little, Guillaume Murray, and J. D. Schwalm

=== Films with multiple nominations ===
Nominations	Films
13	Oppenheimer
12	Killers of the Flower Moon
11	Barbie
8	Maestro
8	Poor Things
7	The Holdovers
5	Ferrari
5	May December
5	Napoleon
4	American Fiction
3	American Symphony
3	Anatomy of a Fall
3	Past Lives
3	Saltburn
3	Spider-Man: Across the Spider-Verse
3	The Zone of Interest
2	All of Us Strangers
2	The Color Purple
2	Dream Scenario
2	Fallen Leaves
2	Mission: Impossible – Dead Reckoning Part One
2	Rustin
2	Society of the Snow

=== Films with multiple wins ===
Wins	Films
4	The Holdovers
4	Oppenheimer
3	Maestro
2	American Fiction
2	Barbie
2	Poor Things

== Television winners and nominees ==
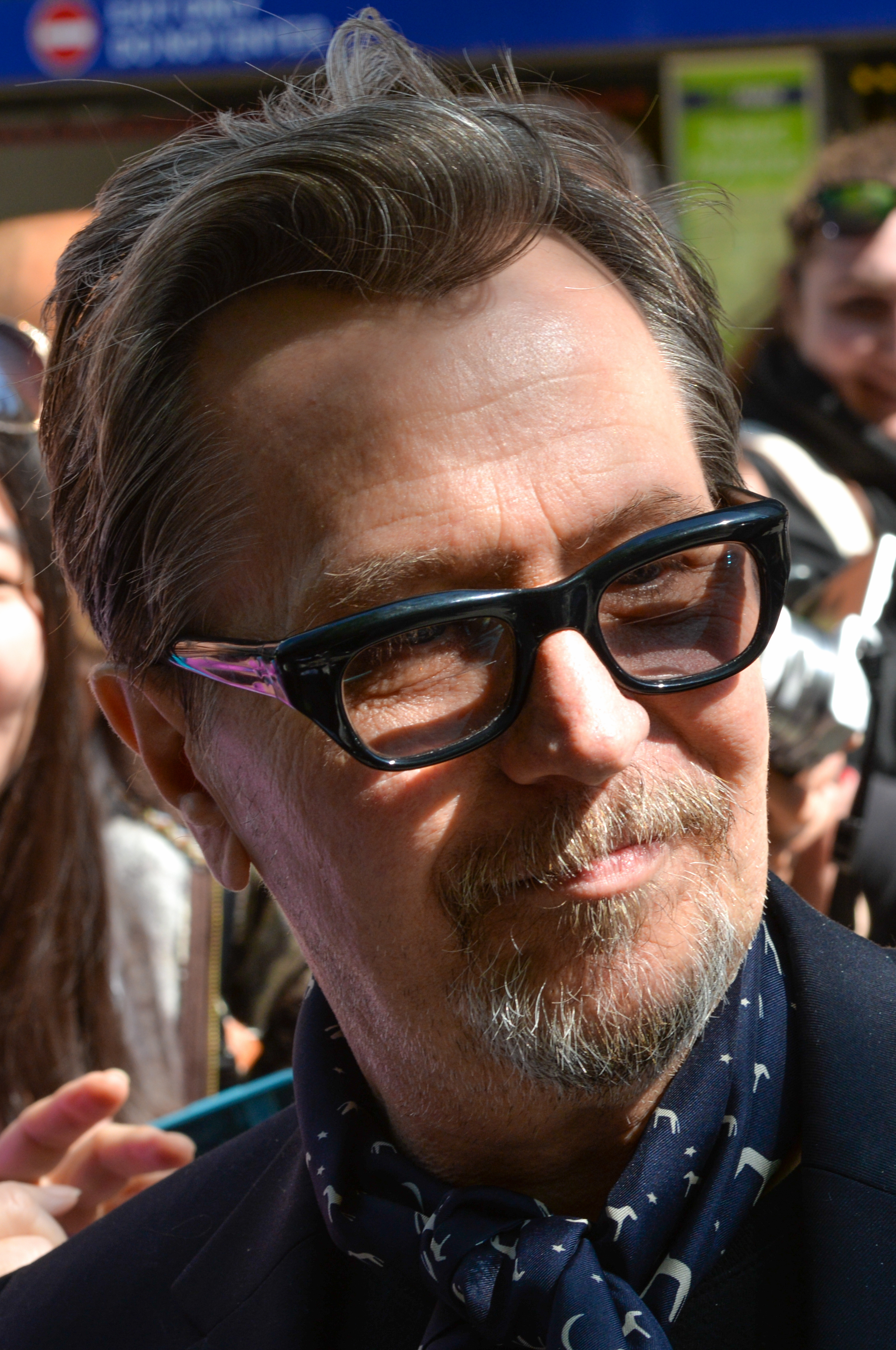
Gary Oldman, Best Actor in a Drama or Genre Series winner

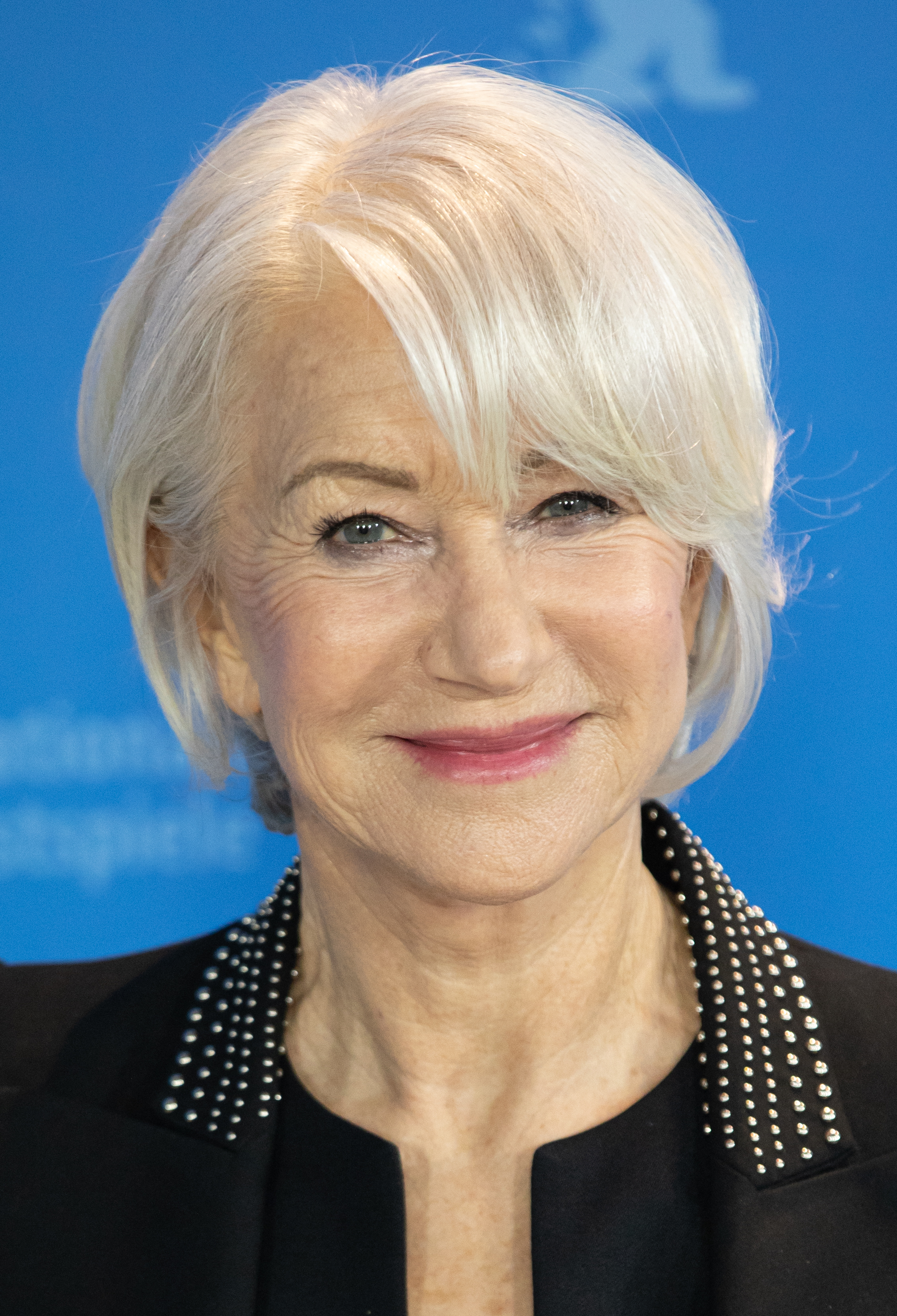
Helen Mirren, Best Actress in a Drama or Genre Series winner

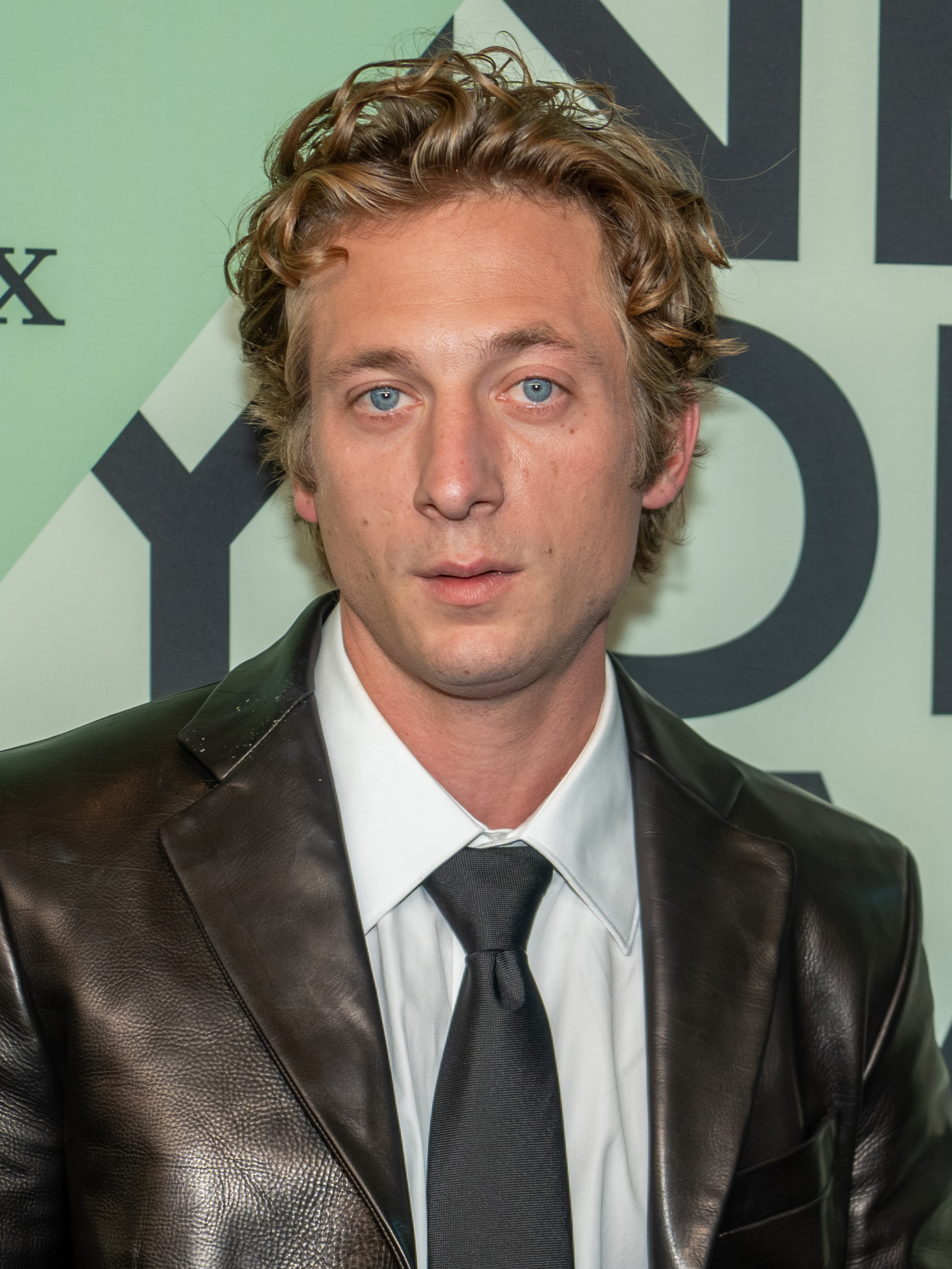
Jeremy Allen White, Best Actor in a Comedy or Musical Series winner

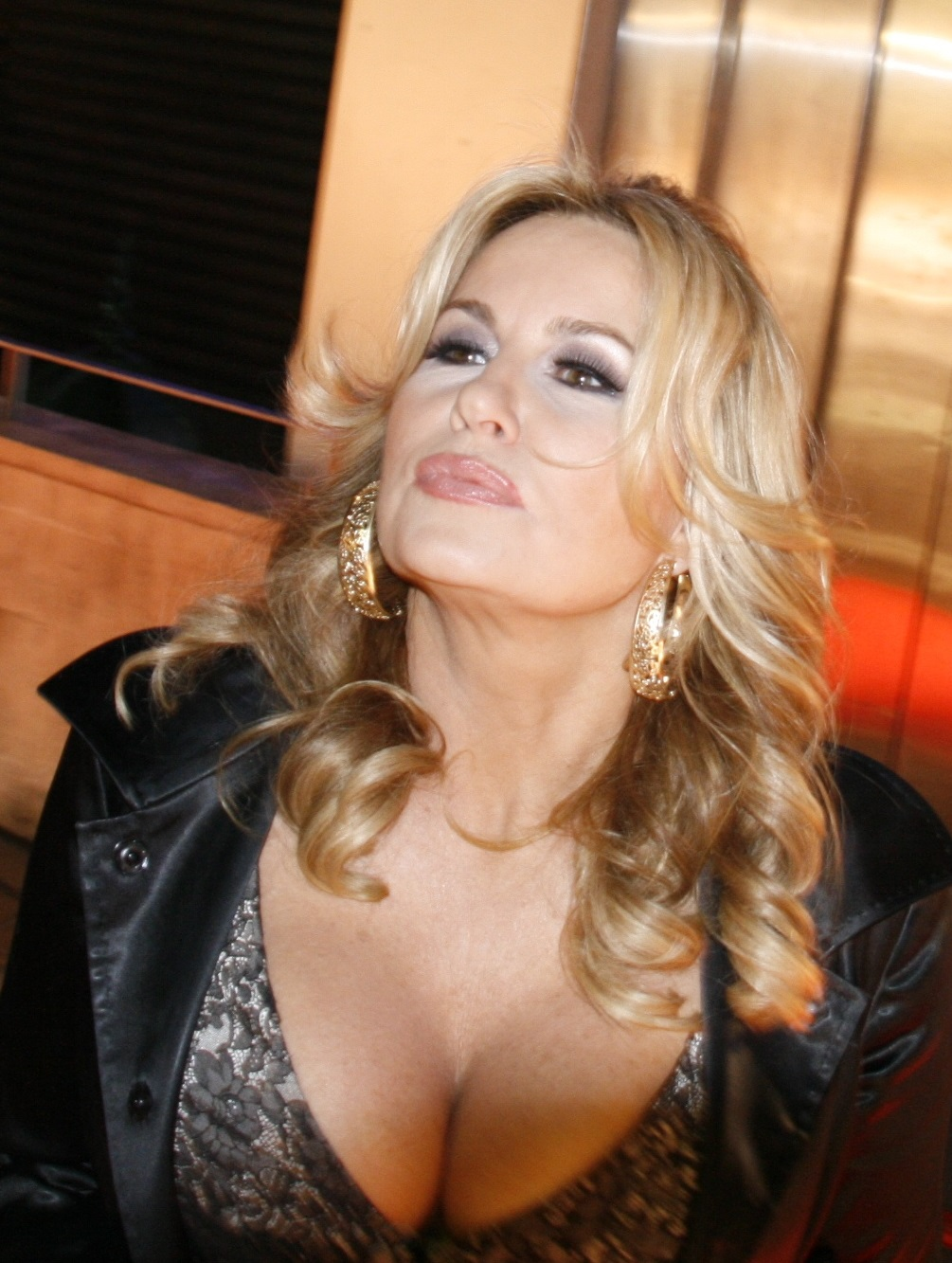
Jennifer Coolidge, Best Actress in a Comedy or Musical Series winner

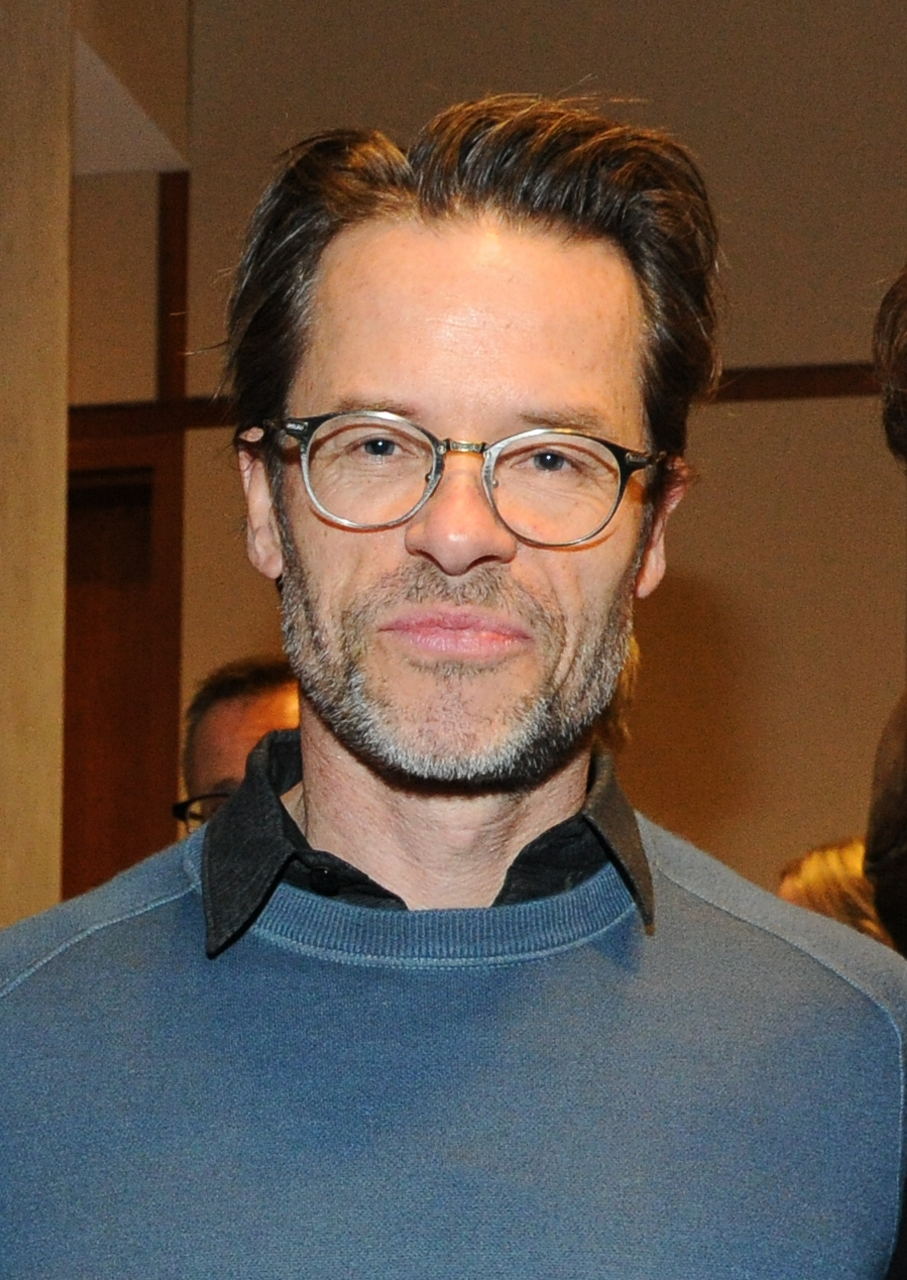
Guy Pearce, Best Actor in a Miniseries, Limited Series, or Motion Picture Made for Television winner

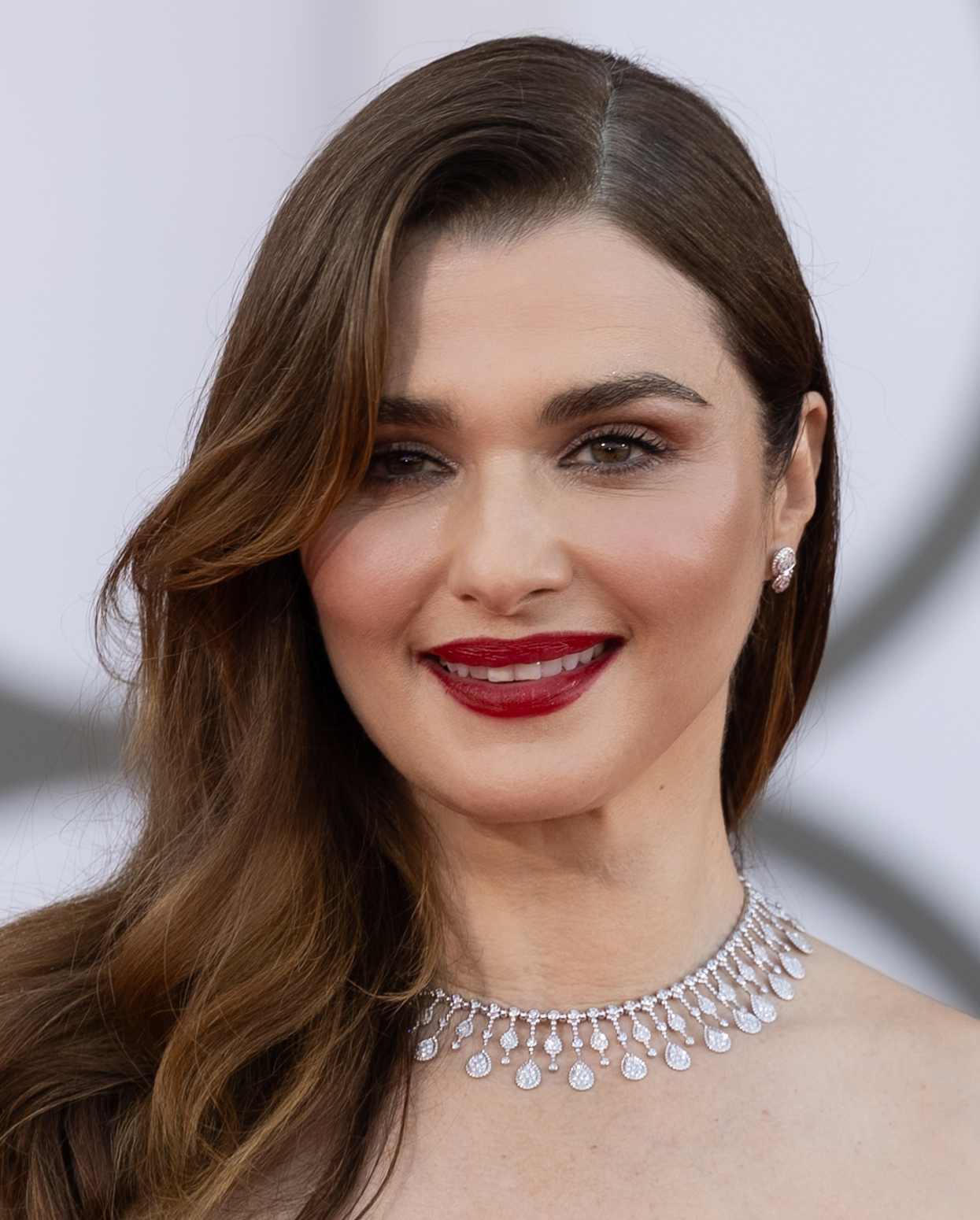
Rachel Weisz, Best Actress in a Miniseries, Limited Series, or Motion Picture Made for Television winner

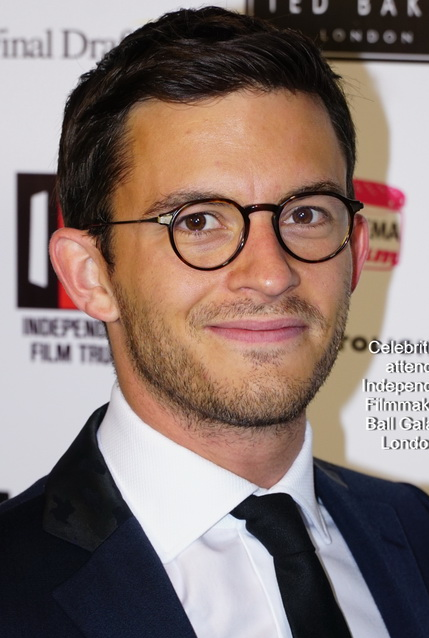
Jonathan Bailey, Best Actor in a Supporting Role in a Series, Miniseries & Limited Series, or Motion Picture Made for Television winner

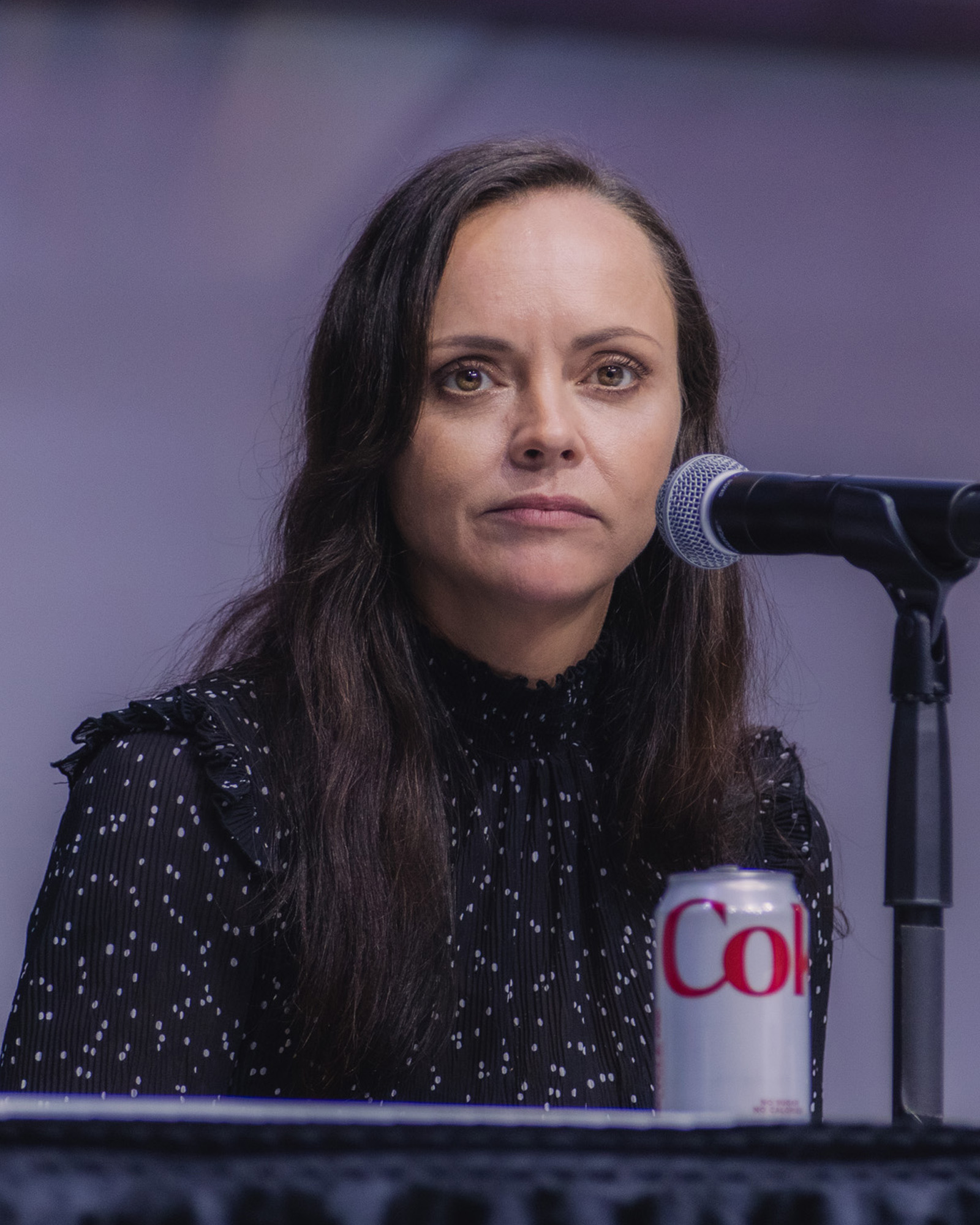
Christina Ricci, Best Actress in a Supporting Role in a Series, Miniseries & Limited Series, or Motion Picture Made for Television winner

Winners are listed first and highlighted in bold.

Best Drama Series	Best Comedy or Musical Series
**The Last of Us (HBO Max)**; 1923 (Paramount+); The Crown (Netflix); Godfather of Harlem (MGM+); Succession (HBO)	**Only Murders in the Building (Disney+)**; Abbott Elementary (ABC); Barry (HBO); The Bear (Hulu); Reservation Dogs (FX); Ted Lasso (Apple TV+)
Best Genre Series	Best Miniseries & Limited Series or Motion Picture Made for Television
**Yellowjackets (Showtime)**; From (MGM+); House of the Dragon (HBO Max); The Morning Show (Apple TV+); The Power (Prime Video); The White Lotus (HBO)	**Fargo (FX)**; All the Light We Cannot See (Netflix); Beef (Netflix); Fellow Travelers (Showtime); A Spy Among Friends (MGM+); Tiny Beautiful Things (Hulu)
Best Actor in a Drama or Genre Series	Best Actress in a Drama or Genre Series
**Gary Oldman – Slow Horses as Jackson Lamb (Apple TV+)**; Brian Cox – Succession as Logan Roy (HBO); Harrison Ford – 1923 as Jacob Dutton (Paramount+); Pedro Pascal – The Last of Us as Joel Miller (HBO Max); Jeremy Strong – Succession as Kendall Roy (HBO)	**Helen Mirren – 1923 as Cara Dutton (Paramount+)**; Rebecca Ferguson – Silo as Juliette Nichols (Apple TV+); Melanie Lynskey – Yellowjackets as Shauna Shipman (Showtime); Bella Ramsey – The Last of Us as Ellie (HBO Max); Sarah Snook – Succession as Siobhan "Shiv" Roy (HBO); Imelda Staunton – The Crown as Queen Elizabeth II (Netflix)
Best Actor in a Comedy or Musical Series	Best Actress in a Comedy or Musical Series
**Jeremy Allen White – The Bear as Carmen "Carmy" Berzatto (Hulu)**; Bill Hader – Barry as Barry Berkman (HBO); Steve Martin – Only Murders in the Building as Charles-Haden Savage (Disney+); Martin Short – Only Murders in the Building as Oliver Putnam (Disney+); Jason Sudeikis – Ted Lasso as Ted Lasso (Apple TV+)	**Jennifer Coolidge – The White Lotus as Tanya McQuoid-Hunt (HBO)**; Rachel Brosnahan – The Marvelous Mrs. Maisel as Miriam "Midge" Maisel (Prime Video); Ayo Edebiri – The Bear as Sydney Adamu (Hulu); Elle Fanning – The Great as Catherine the Great (Hulu); Selena Gomez – Only Murders in the Building as Mabel Mora (Disney+)
Best Actor in a Miniseries, Limited Series, or Motion Picture Made for Television	Best Actress in a Miniseries, Limited Series, or Motion Picture Made for Television
**Guy Pearce – A Spy Among Friends as Kim Philby (MGM+)**; Matt Bomer – Fellow Travelers as Hawkins "Hawk" Fuller (Showtime); Jon Hamm – Fargo as Sheriff Roy Tillman (FX); Damian Lewis – A Spy Among Friends as Nicholas Elliott (MGM+); Bill Pullman – Murdaugh Murders: The Movie as Alex Murdaugh (Lifetime); Steven Yeun – Beef as Danny Cho (Netflix)	**Rachel Weisz – Dead Ringers as Beverly Mantle / Elliot Mantle (Prime Video)**; Kathryn Hahn – Tiny Beautiful Things as Clare Pierce (Hulu); Brie Larson – Lessons in Chemistry as Elizabeth Zott (Apple TV+); Anna Maxwell Martin – A Spy Among Friends as Lily Thomas (MGM+); Juno Temple – Fargo as Dorothy "Dot" Lyon (FX); Ali Wong – Beef as Amy Lau (Netflix)
Best Actor in a Supporting Role in a Series, Miniseries & Limited Series, or Motion Picture Made for Television	Best Actress in a Supporting Role in a Series, Miniseries & Limited Series, or Motion Picture Made for Television
**Jonathan Bailey – Fellow Travelers as Tim Laughlin (Showtime)**; Khalid Abdalla – The Crown as Dodi Fayed (Netflix); Murray Bartlett – The Last of Us as Frank (HBO Max); James Cromwell – Succession as Ewan Roy (HBO); Jon Gries – The White Lotus as Greg Hunt (HBO); Lamar Johnson – The Last of Us as Henry Burrell (HBO Max)	**Christina Ricci – Yellowjackets as Misty Quigley (Showtime)**; Elizabeth Debicki – The Crown as Diana, Princess of Wales (Netflix); J. Smith-Cameron – Succession as Gerri Kellman (HBO); Meryl Streep – Only Murders in the Building as Loretta Durkin (Disney+); Hannah Waddingham – Ted Lasso as Rebecca Welton (Apple TV+); Merritt Wever – Tiny Beautiful Things as Frankie Pierce (Hulu)

=== Series with multiple nominations ===
Nominations	Series
6	Succession
5	The Last of Us
5	Only Murders in the Building
4	The Crown
4	A Spy Among Friends
3	1923
3	The Bear
3	Beef
3	Fargo
3	Fellow Travelers
3	Ted Lasso
3	Tiny Beautiful Things
3	The White Lotus
3	Yellowjackets
2	Barry

=== Series with multiple wins ===
Wins	Series
2	Yellowjackets
