= Pöysti =

Pöysti is a Finnish surname. Notable people with the surname include:

- Lasse Pöysti (1927–2019), Finnish actor, director, theatre manager and writer
- Toini Pöysti (born 1933), Finnish cross-country skier
- Erik Pöysti (born 1955), a Finnish film director and actor; son of Lasse Pöysti
- Alma Pöysti (born 1981), a Swedo-Finnish film director and actress; daughter of Erik Pöysti and granddaughter of Lasse Pöysti
- Eetu Pöysti (born 1989), Finnish professional ice hockey forward
