= Mac Ruth =

American sound mixer

- Occupation: Sound Mixer
- Years active: 1990–present

Mac Ruth is an American sound mixer. He has worked on numerous films, including Underworld (2003), The Cave (2005), Eragon (2006), Hansel & Gretel: Witch Hunters (2013). Hercules (2014), The Martian (2015), Spy (2015), among others.

He was nominated at the 88th Academy Awards in the category of Best Sound Mixing for The Martian. His nomination was shared with Paul Massey and Mark Taylor.

He was also nominated at the 89th Academy Awards and the 90th Academy Awards for his work on 13 Hours: The Secret Soldiers of Benghazi and Blade Runner 2049, respectively.

He won at the 94th Academy Awards for his work on Dune, sharing his award with Mark Mangini, Theo Green, Doug Hemphill and Ron Bartlett.

He's been living in Hungary since 1997, and speaks fluent Hungarian.
