= Katariina Kaitue =

Finnish actress (born 1967)

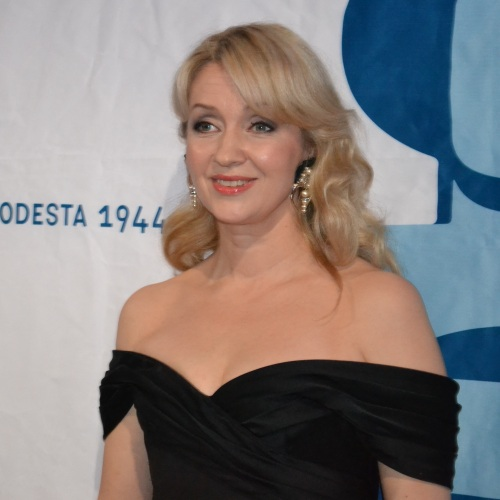
- Born: 21 January 1967 (age 59); Helsinki, Finland
- Spouse: Sakari Harima (1989–2003)
- Children: 2
- Parent(s): Liisamaija Laaksonen; Raimo Kaitue

Katariina Kaitue (born 21 January 1967 in Helsinki) is a Finnish actress. She has been a regular actress since 1991 at the Finnish National Theatre, where she has performed dozens of roles.

Kaitue studied at the Helsinki Theatre Academy from 1987 to 1991. Along with her theatre career, she has appeared in films and performed voice acting, among other things in Disney's cartoons.

Kaitue is the daughter of actress Liisamaija Laaksonen and sister of business manager Karri Kaitue. In 2007, Kaitue became engaged to Matti Vänskä. She has two children from her previous marriage with Sakari Harima.

== Filmography ==
- Kirkkaalta taivaalta
- Ihmiselon ihanuus ja kurjuus (1988)
- Vääpeli Körmy ja marsalkan sauva (1990)
- Siivotaan, siivotaan (1991–1992) viihdesarja
- Kaivo (1992)
- Romanovin kivet (1993)
- Onnen maa (1993)
- Isältä pojalle (1996)
- Viisi tytärtäni (1997) television series
- Rakkauden tanssi osa 1 (1998)
- Poika ja ilves (1998)
- Johtaja Uuno Turhapuro – pisnismies (1998)
- Häjyt (1999)
- Tunteen palo (1999)
- Mennyt heinäkuu (1999)
- Presidentti (2000)
- Parhaat vuodet (2000–2002)
- Kaverille ei jätetä (2001)
- Emmauksen tiellä (2001)
- Duetto Amoroso (2002)
- Juoksuhaudantie (2004)
- Game Over (2005)
- Suden vuosi (2007)
- Lacrimosa (2008) television series
- Helppo elämä (2009)
- Kotirauha (2011)
- Roskisprinssi (2011)
- Amazing Race Suomi (2023)
- 66th North Precinct (2023)
