= Flame Top =

1980 film

- Original Finnish film poster
- Directed by: Pirjo Honkasalo; Pekka Lehto
- Written by: Pirjo Honkasalo; Pekka Lehto; Algot Untola
- Produced by: Claes Olsson
- Starring: Asko Sarkola; Rea Mauranen; Kari Franck; Esko Salminen
- Cinematography: Kari Sohlberg
- Edited by: Irma Taina
- Release date: 17 February 1980
- Running time: 155 minutes
- Country: Finland
- Language: Finnish

Flame Top (Finnish: Tulipää) is a 1980 Finnish drama film directed by Pirjo Honkasalo and Pekka Lehto. It was entered into the 1981 Cannes Film Festival. The film depicts the life of the writer Algot Untola. The film was selected as the Finnish entry for the Best Foreign Language Film at the 53rd Academy Awards, but was not accepted as a nominee.

== Plot ==
The film depicts the life of Finnish writer, journalist, and revolutionary Algot Untola, who wrote under several pseudonyms, including Maiju Lassila and Irmari Rantamala. Its narrative moves between different periods of Untola's life. He works as a teacher in the Finnish countryside before moving to Saint Petersburg, where he becomes involved in business. He later adopts socialist politics and becomes a writer. The story culminates in Untola's death during the Finnish Civil War in 1918.

== Cast ==
- Asko Sarkola as Algot Untola
- Rea Mauranen as Olga Esempio
- Kari Franck as Gunnar Avanto
- Esko Salminen as Arwid
- Ritva Juhanto as Kurttuska
- Ari Suonsuu as Kalle
- Tuomas Railo as Sulo Esempio
- Heikki Alho as Pikku-Pouvali
- Yuri Rodionov as Rawitz
- Galina Galtseva as Magda
- Soli Labbart as Maria Lassila
- Pirkka Karskela as Young Algot
- Markku Blomqvist as Lundberg
- Esa Suvilehto as Pöntinen
- Matti Oravisto as Commandant Carl von Wendt

== See also ==
- List of submissions to the 53rd Academy Awards for Best Foreign Language Film
- List of Finnish submissions for the Academy Award for Best Foreign Language Film
