= Herr Puntila and His Servant Matti =

Herr Puntila and His Servant Matti may refer to:

- Herr Puntila and His Servant Matti (1960 film), an Austrian comedy film
- Herr Puntila and His Servant Matti (1979 film), a Finnish-Swedish drama film
