= Liisamaija Laaksonen =

Finnish actress (born 1938)

Liisamaija Laaskonen
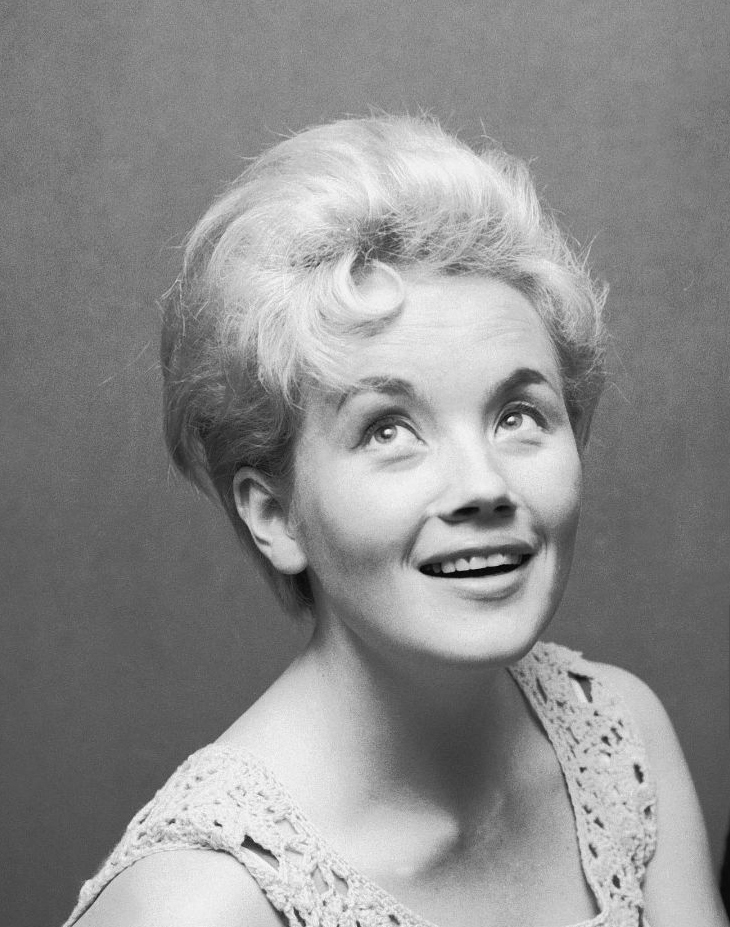
- in 1965
- Born: 6 May 1938 (age 88); Lahti, Finland
- Occupation: Actress
- Spouse: Raimo Kaitue (1963–1978)
- Children: 2, including Katariina Kaitue

Liisamaija Laaksonen-Kaitue (born 6 May 1938 in Lahti) is a Finnish actress, who has become famous for her roles in films and television series. She wrote several television shows in the 1990s and 2000s.

== Biography ==
Laaksonen attended the Helsinki Theatre Academy from 1960 to 1963 and worked as a regular actress of Yle 1963-1998 and since 1998 as a free artist. She has appeared at the Finnish National Theatre, Intimiteatter, Helsinki City Theatre, Finnish National Opera, and Savonlinna Opera Festival. In addition, she has been reading poetry throughout Finland, as well as in Sweden, Germany, the United States, and Canada.

Laaksonen sang at the end of the 1960s in a vocal band called Stidit, whose other members were also actresses Iris-Lilja Lassila and Tarja-Tuulikki Tarsala. Their greatest hits were the 1969 Pienenä tyttönä, a composition by Laaksonen.

Laaksonen has been awarded with three Jussi Awards for her performances in the films Black on White (1968), The Glory and Misery of Human Life (1989), and Kaivo (1992). Her role in the television series Solveigin laulu (1974) also gained widespread attention.

The Pro Finlandia Medal was awarded to Laaksonen in 1989. In 2012, she was awarded her lifetime achievement award at the Kultainen Venla.

She is the mother of Katariina Kaitue, who is also an actress.

== Filmography ==
=== Films ===
- Rakkaus alkaa aamuyöstä (1966)
- Black on White (1968)
- Vain neljä kertaa (1968)
- Sixtynine 69 (1969)
- Anna (1970)
- Marja pieni! (1972)
- Mona ja palavan rakkauden aika (1983)
- The Glory and Misery of Human Life (1988)
- Petoa (1988)
- Kaivo (1992)
- Äidin tyttö (1993)

=== Television ===
- Onnellinen mies (1979)
- Liian paksu perhoseksi (1998)
- Viisi tytärtäni (1996)
- Presidentti (2000)

=== Screenwriter ===
- Lumikit (1986)
- Irti maasta (1989)
- Kiinnisidottu (1994)
- Viisi tytärtäni (1996)
- Päätös (2000)
- Yhteinen huone (television series, 2002)
- Sänky (television series, 2002–2003)
- Varpuset (television series, 2005)
- Lacrimosa – kyynelten päivä (2008)
