= Ron Bartlett =

American sound engineer

- Occupation: Sound Mixer
- Years active: 1985-present

Ron Bartlett is a sound mixer who was nominated at the 85th Academy Awards for the film Life of Pi. He was nominated in the category of Best Sound Mixing, he shared his nomination with Doug Hemphill and Drew Kunin. He was nominated again in the same category at the 90th Academy Awards for his work in Blade Runner 2049, along with Doug Hemphill and Mac Ruth.

Bartlett won an Academy Award in the category Best Sound for the film Dune. He has produced sound on over 150 films since 1985.
