= Drew Kunin =

- Born: Andrew Paul Kunin
- Other name: Andrew Kunin
- Occupation: Production Sound Mixer
- Years active: 1984–present

Drew Kunin is a production sound mixer who was nominated at the 85th Academy Awards for the film Life of Pi. He was nominated in the category of Best Sound Mixing, he shared his nomination with Ron Bartlett and Doug Hemphill. He received his second nomination at the 88th Academy Awards for his work on the film Bridge of Spies.

He has recorded sound for over 70 films since 1984. He often works with director Ang Lee. He won an Emmy Award in 1993 for Outstanding Sound Mixing for a Drama Miniseries or a Special for his work on the television film Stalin.
