= Two Funny Guys =

- Directed by: Lasse Pöysti
- Written by: Kaarlo Nuorvala
- Produced by: Mauno Mäkelä
- Starring: Lasse Pöysti; Toini Vartiainen; Pentti Viljanen
- Cinematography: Esko Töyri
- Edited by: Nils Holm
- Music by: George de Godzinsky
- Production company: Fennada-Filmi
- Distributed by: Adams Filmi
- Release date: 30 April 1953
- Running time: 91 minutes
- Country: Finland
- Language: Finnish

Two Funny Guys (Finnish: 2 hauskaa vekkulia) is a 1953 Finnish comedy film directed by Lasse Pöysti and starring Pöysti, Toini Vartiainen and Pentti Viljanen.

The film's sets were designed by Kai Lappalainen.

== Cast ==
- Toini Vartiainen as Marja
- Lasse Pöysti as Säveltäjä Jussi Mäki
- Pentti Viljanen as Martti Teräs
- Reino Valkama as Alfonso
- Rauni Luoma as Neiti Jansson
- Aino Angerkoski as Rouva hopeaheimo
- Johnny Jansson as Soitto-oppilas
- Tapio Rautavaara as Laulaja Ville
- Annikki Tähti as Laulaja lavalla
- Jorma Ikävalko as Laulaja lavalla
- Kauko Kokkonen as Pianisti ja säveltäjä
- Anton Soini as Talonmies
- Hannes Veivo as Kanninen
- Hilly Lindqvist
- Elvi Saarnio as Laskun karhuaja
- Elli Ylimaa
- Assi Raine
- Runar Tuurno
- Pentti Irjala as Radioreportteri
- Ossi Korhonen
- Aarne Hemming as Kapellimestari fudzinsky
- Urho Lahti
- Eero Leväluoma
- Joel Asikainen
- Mauri Jaakkola
- Kauko Vuorensola
- Aarno Walli

== Bibliography ==
- Qvist, Per Olov & von Bagh, Peter. Guide to the Cinema of Sweden and Finland. Greenwood Publishing Group, 2000.
