= 66th North Precinct =

2023 Finnish television film

- Genre: Crime drama
- Created by: Olli Haikka; Olli Tola; Timo Varpio
- Screenplay by: Timo Varpio; Juha Karvanen; Tiina Tanskanen; Anna Meling; Fanni Mikkola
- Directed by: Teppo Airaksinen
- Starring: Saara Kotkaniemi; Iina Kuustonen; Karim Rapatti; Heikki Ranta; Eero Saarinen; Katariina Kaitue; Stella Leppikorpi; Mihku Köngäs; Sari Siikander
- Theme music composer: Ukko Heinonen
- Country of origin: Finland
- Original language: Finnish
- No. of series: 2
- No. of episodes: 16

Production
- Executive producers: Olli Haikka; Riku Riihilahti; Laura Teirikko; Lotta Westerberg
- Producer: Paula Pitkänen
- Cinematography: Aarne Tapola; Joonas Pulkkanen
- Editors: Toni Tikkanen; Antti Jääskeläinen; Jussi Rautaniemi; Teemu Pöllänen
- Production company: Yellow Film & TV

Original release
- Network: Yle TV1
- Release: March 7, 2023 – present

66th North Precinct (Finnish: Pohjoisen tähti) is a Finnish crime drama television series. The series is about a former female boxer who works as a police officer in Lapland.

The series was filmed in Helsinki and Rovaniemi. Some of the crimes featured in the series are based on real-life cases but have been fictionalized and adapted to fit the world of the series. Former professional boxer Eva Wahlström served as the series' boxing consultant and also appeared as an actor in the second season.

NBC plans to produce an American version based on the series, with Arika Mittman (The Irrational) serving as showrunner. In the upcoming American version, the events of the series take place in Colorado.

== See also ==
- List of Finnish television series
