= Birgitta Ulfsson =

Finnish actress and theater director

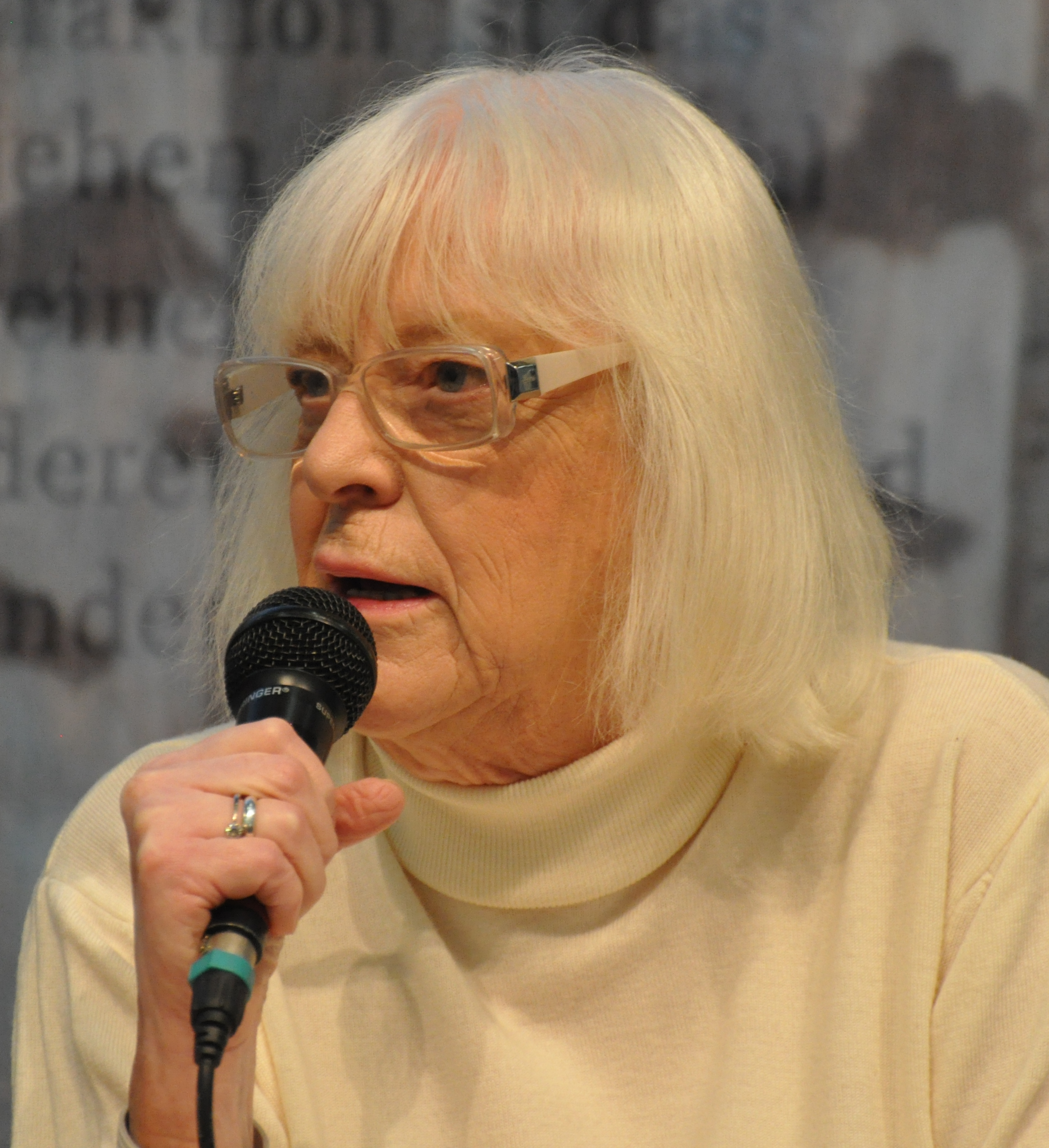
- Ulfsson in 2011
- Born: Birgitta Margaretha Ulfsson; 1 July 1928; Helsinki, Finland
- Died: 8 October 2017 (aged 89); Helsinki, Finland
- Occupations: Actress, stage director
- Spouses: Lasse Pöysti (m. 1952; div. 1984); Iwar Wiklander (m. 2007)
- Children: Tom Pöysti; Erik Pöysti
- Relatives: Alma Pöysti (granddaughter)

Birgitta Margaretha Ulfsson (1 July 1928, Helsinki – 8 October 2017, Helsinki) was a Finland-Swedish actress and theater director. She was a versatile actor and a recognized pioneer of avant-garde theater in Finland. Throughout her career, she performed in Finland and Sweden in two languages. In Sweden, she was best known as "Muminmamma" in the TV series about Mumintrollet and for her role in Rederiet.

== Biography ==
=== Upbringing and education ===
Birgitta Ulfsson was the daughter of colonel Erik Ulfsson and the bank clerk Saga Törnqvist. Birgitta Ulfsson grew up in an officer's family and spent her childhood in various garrison towns in Finland. The family moved to Helsinki in 1940, where she graduated from Lönnbeckska samskolan in 1946. The school circle included, among others, the future writers Christer Kihlman and Bo Carpelan.

She began her career at the Swedish Theatre in Helsinki after studying at the Swedish Theatre's stage school from 1948 to 1950. According to her husband Lasse Pöysti, the stage school gave her self-confidence a severe blow and she seriously considered leaving the theater career.

=== Lilla Teatern ===
In 1956, Ulfsson moved to Lilla Teatern, a theatre in Helsinki, where she quickly became a well-known profile. During her early years, she performed mostly as a comedian, but later also took on more dramatic roles.

An early breakthrough came with the role of the girl Jo in Shelagh Delaney's A Taste of Honey (1958, directed by the Finland-SwedishRalf Långbacka), which Bo Carpelan in the magazine Nya Argus called her "definitive breakthrough" as a character actress. In the same year, she played the theatre rat Emma in Tove Jansson's Moomin play Troll i kulisserna, whose guest performance in Stockholm was an unusual success and had great significance for Lilla Teatern's and Ulfsson's future contacts with Sweden.

Ulfsson and Pöysti worked as theatre managers of Lilla Teatern from 1967 to 1974. To manage the theater's finances, they mortgaged their private property. After the theater was sold in 1974, they moved to Tampere, but Ulfsson returned to Lilla Teatern as soon as 1978.

=== Career in Sweden ===
When Pöysti became director of the Royal Dramatic Theatre in Stockholm in 1981, Ulfsson also moved to Sweden. The marriage dissolved in 1984. In Sweden, Ulfsson first became known as a participant in the first TV series about Moomin, where she played Moominmamma – and thus played the mother of her own husband Lasse Pöysti, who played Moomintroll.

From 1983 to 1991, Ulfsson worked at the Folkteatern in Gothenburg, where her interpretation of the role of mother Aase in Peer Gynt received glowing reviews in Swedish newspapers. She has also made several guest appearances in Finland, including an important visit to the Lilla Teatern in Helsinki with the interpretation of the blind Hamm in Samuel Beckett's Slutspel (1992) – a role she herself highlighted as her best performance ever.

Birgitta Ulfsson appeared in over ten films. She was the voice of the ship Freja in the TV series Rederiet during the series' anniversary episode in 2001.

From the mid-1980s, Ulfsson also appeared as a performer in song and poetry programs. Together with musician Erna Tauro, she toured with the program På kensliga fotsulor, made up of Finnish and Finland-Swedish poetry, songs and her own comments. Through her work in Sweden, she came to act as an informal cultural ambassador between the two countries, something that was noted by, among others, the Swedish Academy and the Swedish Municipal Workers' Union.

== Personal life ==
From 1952 to 1984, she was married to actor Lasse Pöysti. From 2007 until her death in 2017, she was married to Iwar Wiklander. The couple resided in Gothenburg, Sweden. Her son Erik Pöysti and granddaughter Alma Pöysti are both actors in Helsinki.

== Awards ==
- 1973 – Pro Finlandia-medal
- 1979 – Karl Gerhards honor prize (together with Lasse Pöysti)
- 2010 – Society of Swedish Literature in Finland's anniversary award
- 2015 – Gösta Ekman-scholarship

== Selected filmography ==
- 1953 — Shamrock
- 1983 – A Hill on the Dark Side of the Moon
- 1986 – The Serpent's Way
- 1992 – Sunday's Children
