= Asko Sarkola =

Finnish actor and theatre manager

Lauri Asko Antero Sarkola (born September 3, 1945, in Helsinki) is a Finnish actor and theater manager.

== Education ==
He studied at the Svenska Teaterskolan from 1963 to 1966.

== Career ==
He had a long career at the Swedish-speaking Lilla Teatern, as an actor there 1967–1997, with a break 1982–1985 when he worked as a professor at the Helsinki Theatre Academy, and as a deputy director from 1972 to 1974. In 1974–1981 and 1984–1997, Sarkola was the director of Lilla Teatern. He directed the Helsinki City Theatre from 1998 to 2016.

Sarkola has played numerous roles in television, theater and movies. He starred in the lead, author Algot Untola, in the 1980 film Flame Top. Sarkola has acted in both Finnish and Swedish films and acted as a narrator in the Finnish version of radio drama The Men from the Ministry.

Sarkola has been the chairman of the Finlands Svenska Teaterförbundet 1978–1983, 1985–1986, the chairman of the Centralförbundet för Finlands svenska theater organizer 1983–1988, the Finnish representative of the Nordic Theater and Dance Committee 1988–2000 and the only member of the Norwegian Ministry of Culture's theater committee. In 2013, Sarkola selected the recipient of the Finlandia Prize for Literature. In the autumn of 2017, he played the role of Marshal Mannerheim in Juha Vakkuri's play Mannerheim ja saksalainen suudelma ("Mannerheim and the German Kiss").

== Personal life ==
Sarkolas parents were the author Riku Sarkola och Elsa Linnea Sjöblom.

Sarkola has been married twice and he has three children from his first marriage with Emelie Enckell 1978–1984. Since 1990, Sarkola has been married to actress Jonna Järnefelt and they have three children.

== Selected filmography ==
- Flame Top (Tulipää, 1980)
- Beyond the Front Line (Framom främsta linjen, 2004)
- 1944: The Final Defence (Tali-Ihantala 1944, 2007)
- Blackout (2008)
- Bad Family (Paha perhe, 2010)
- The Human Part (Ihmisen osa, 2018)
