= Pekka Lehto =

Finnish film director

- Born: 14 March 1948 (age 78); Valkeakoski, Finland
- Occupation: Film director
- Years active: 1976-present

Pekka Lehto (born 14 March 1948) is a Finnish film director. He has directed fifteen films since 1976. He co-directed Flame Top with Pirjo Honkasalo and the film was entered into the 1981 Cannes Film Festival. He also won the Jussi Award for Best Director for the film.

His 1992 film Kaivo was entered into the competition at the 49th Venice International Film Festival.

== Selected filmography ==
- Flame Top (1980)
- Da Capo (1985)
- The Well (1992)
- The Real McCoy (1998)
