= The Glory and Misery of Human Life =

- Original Finnish film poster.
- Directed by: Matti Kassila
- Written by: Matti Kassila
- Based on: Ihmiselon ihanuus ja kurjuus by F.E. Sillanpää
- Produced by: Päivi Hartzell
- Starring: Lasse Pöysti, Liisamaija Laaksonen, Tuula Nyman, Antti Litja
- Music by: Jukka Linkola
- Release date: 1988
- Running time: 96 minutes
- Country: Finland
- Language: Finnish

The Glory and Misery of Human Life (Finnish: Ihmiselon ihanuus ja kurjuus) is a 1988 Finnish drama film directed and written by Matti Kassila starring Lasse Pöysti, Liisamaija Laaksonen and Tuula Nyman. It is based on the novel by F.E. Sillanpää.

The film is Jasper Pääkkönen's debut role, when he was seven years old at the time. The film also features Samuli Edelmann in one of his first film roles.

== Plot ==
The film is starring writer Martti Hongisto (Lasse Pöysti), who goes out to meet Anna (Liisamaija Laaksonen) after loving her youth and reminiscing about his past youth. Meanwhile, Hongisto's wife Laimi (Tuula Nyman) is searching for her husband in restaurants.

== Cast ==
- Lasse Pöysti as Martti Hongisto
- Liisamaija Laaksonen as Anna Lepaa
- Tuula Nyman as Laimi Hongisto
- Antti Litja as Jalmari Roimala
- Johanna Kerttula as Hagar Hongisto
- Nina Sallinen as Asta Hongisto
- Jarmo Perälä as Junior Hongisto
- Antti Vierikko as Eero Hongisto
- Jasper Pääkkönen as Arvi Hongisto
- Nina Jääskeläinen as the maid of Hongisto

== Awards ==
Jussi 1989:

- Best Actress (Liisamaija Laaksonen)
- Best Supporting Actress (Tarja Keinänen)
- Best Production Design (Ensio Suominen)
- Best Original Score (Jukka Linkola)
