= Lasse Pöysti =

Finnish actor, director, theatre manager and writer

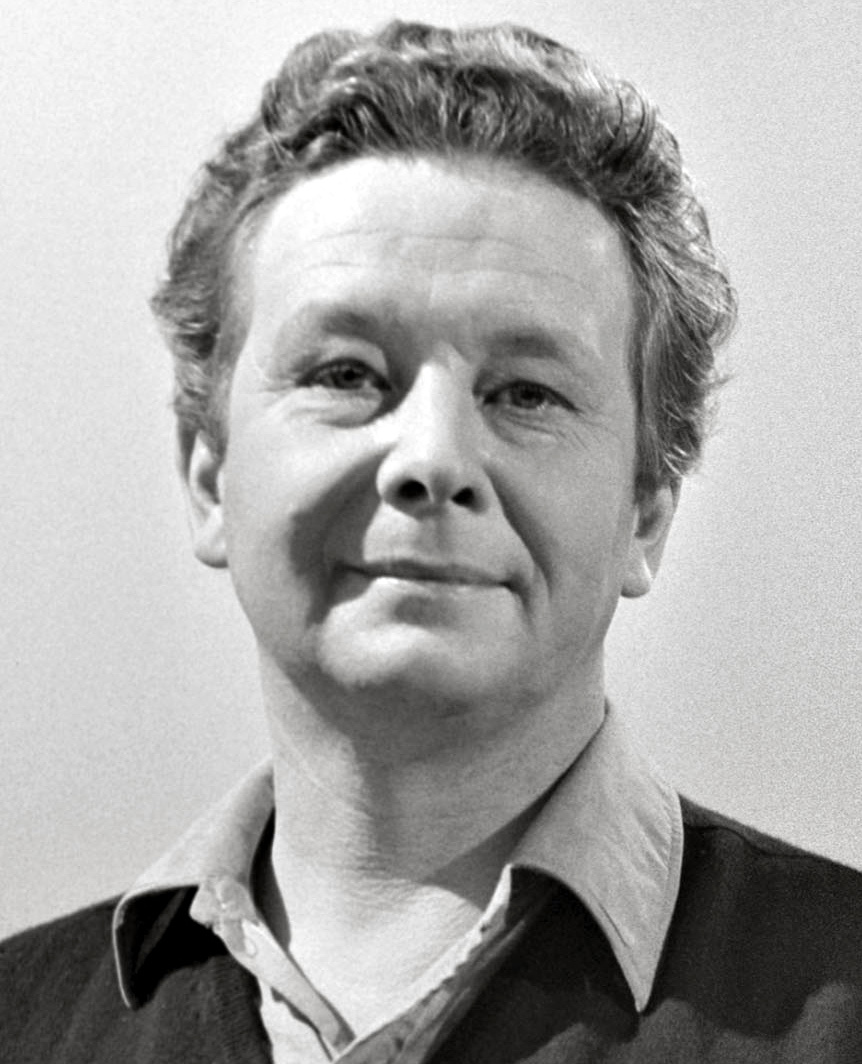
- Pöysti in 1966
- Born: 24 January 1927; Sortavala, Finland
- Died: 5 April 2019 (aged 92); Helsinki, Finland
- Occupations: Actor; director; theatre manager; writer
- Spouse: Birgitta Ulfsson (m. 1952; div. 1984)
- Children: Tom Pöysti; Erik Pöysti
- Relatives: Alma Pöysti (granddaughter)

Lasse Erik Pöysti (Finnish: [ˈlɑsːe ˈpøy̯sti]; 24 January 1927 – 5 April 2019) was a Finnish actor, director, theatre manager and writer. He is best known internationally for voicing Moomintroll in the 1969 television series based on Tove Jansson's Moomins, and in Finland as the child star Olli Suominen in the Suominen family film series of the 1940s. He served as manager of the Royal Dramatic Theatre in Stockholm from 1981 to 1985, and received the Finnish Jussi Award seven times, including a lifetime achievement award in 2010.

== Biography ==
=== Early life and career ===
Pöysti grew up in a bilingual family in Sortavala in Finnish Karelia, with a Finnish-speaking father, the department head Eino Tauno Pöysti, and a Swedish-speaking mother, Signe Maria Köhler. During the Winter War the family was evacuated and eventually settled in Helsinki.

As a child he was convinced he would one day become a famous film star. In the summer of 1940 he responded to a newspaper advertisement in which the film company Suomen Filmiteollisuus was looking for young actors. Receiving no reply, he went directly to the company's managing director Toivo Särkkä and performed his own version of Walt Disney's Snow White and the Seven Dwarfs. He was given an immediate screen test and was selected from among 250 applicants for the role of Olli Suominen in the Suominen family film series.

The first of the Suominen family films was Suomisen perhe (1941), when Pöysti was 14 years old. Pöysti matriculated in 1945 at the Helsinki Normal Lyceum. After matriculating, he studied at the University of Helsinki. He was an actor at the Finnish National Theatre from 1944 to 1952, where he received praise for his roles in Shakespeare's Twelfth Night (1949) and Max Frisch's The Chinese Wall (1949). In 1949 he also directed his first production, a Finnish-language version of Federico García Lorca's The Shoemaker's Prodigious Wife, which he had translated himself and which was well received by critics. He was an actor at the Intimiteatteri from 1952 to 1955.

=== Theatre career and breakthrough ===
In 1955 Pöysti joined the Lilla Teatern in Helsinki, where he performed in Swedish alongside actress Birgitta Ulfsson, whom he had married in 1952. The theatre's season was typically divided in two: the autumn programme challenged audiences with more demanding repertoire, while the spring season featured revues with political satire and topical material written by the theatre's resident author Benedict Zilliacus. Pöysti also had his own television programme, Lasse Pöysti Show.

Pöysti had already served as director and announcer for Finland's first public television broadcast in 1955, and in 1963 he joined the TV theatre as an actor. His most celebrated television role of this period was the title role in August Strindberg's Gustav III, a performance that has been highlighted as the defining element each time the recording has been rebroadcast. He also had the leading role in Strindberg's Erik XIV.

The international breakthrough came when Lilla Teatern staged Tove Jansson's Moomins in the early 1960s, with Pöysti as Moomintroll. The production toured to Stockholm, where it introduced Finnish-Swedish theatre to Swedish audiences. It has been said that Finnish-Swedish, which to Swedish ears could sound archaic and somewhat comic, began to be appreciated through the Moomins. In the late 1960s the theatre's actors also made a television series with the characters.

In 1967 Pöysti and Ulfsson took over the ownership and management of Lilla Teatern. Under their leadership the theatre developed a more openly political profile, staging works such as Peter Weiss's Song of the Lusitanian Bogey and holding post-performance discussions with audiences. From 1971 to 1974 Pöysti was also an Artist Professor. In 1974 the theatre was sold to Asko Sarkola, and Pöysti became manager of the Tampere Workers' Theatre, a post he held until 1981.

In 1981 Pöysti moved to Stockholm to lead the Royal Dramatic Theatre, one of the largest stages in the Nordic countries. His tenure was marked by recurring disputes over actors' leave of absence, the proportion of children's theatre in the repertoire, and the general direction of programming. His original plan for a sustained exploration of the Age of Enlightenment never gained traction. He was dismissed midway through his second term in 1985 due to deteriorating relations with the company.

=== Later years ===
After leaving the Royal Dramatic Theatre Pöysti returned to full-time acting after nearly twenty years in managerial roles. Throughout his career he had been known primarily as a comedian, particularly popular in military farce films during the 1950s. Among his most acclaimed later film roles were the title role in Ralf Långbacka's adaptation of Bertolt Brecht's Herr Puntila and His Servant Matti (1979) and the lead in Matti Kassila's adaptation of F. E. Sillanpää's The Glory and Misery of Human Life (1988), in which he played a self-portrait of a writer whose creativity has dried up. He also read bedtime stories in the Finnish children's television programme Pikku Kakkonen from 1977, becoming familiar to a whole generation of Finnish children.

In his later career Pöysti continued to appear regularly in film and television. He fulfilled an ambition by moving to Paris in the early 1990s, before eventually settling in Lauttasaari, Helsinki. In addition to his stage and screen career, Pöysti wrote several books including a memoir trilogy, and translated plays into Finnish by authors including Federico García Lorca, Georges Feydeau and Jacques Deval. He received the Finnish Jussi Award seven times, including a lifetime achievement award in 2010. He was awarded the Pro Finlandia Medal in 1969.

Pöysti died in Helsinki in April 2019, aged 92. His and Ulffson's son Erik Pöysti and their granddaughter Alma Pöysti are both actors in Helsinki.

== Selected filmography ==
- 1941: Suomisen perhe - Olli Suominen
- 1941: Täysosuma - Skier (uncredited)
- 1941: Onnellinen ministeri - Errand Boy (uncredited)
- 1942: Suomisen Ollin tempaus - Olli Suominen
- 1943: Suomisen taiteilijat - Olli Suominen
- 1944: Suomisen Olli rakastuu - Olli Suominen
- 1945: Suomisen Olli yllättää - Olli Suominen
- 1948: Haaviston Leeni - (uncredited)
- 1948: Kilroy sen teki - Pete
- 1948: Hormoonit valloillaan - Pena
- 1949: Ruma Elsa - Usko Aamunen
- 1949: Katupeilin takana - Arvid
- 1949: Sinut minä tahdon - Seppo Vesa
- 1949: Professori Masa - Pentti Simola
- 1950: Isäpappa ja keltanokka - Aimo Tammela
- 1950: Rakkaus on nopeampi Piiroisen pässiäkin - Heikki Piiparinen
- 1951: Vain laulajapoikia - Dr. Syrjä
- 1951: Radio tekee murron - Radio reporter
- 1951: The General's Fiancée - Korpraali Jukka Oksapää
- 1951: A Night in Rio - Lasse
- 1951: Tukkijoella - Pölhö-Kustaa
- 1951: Vihaan sinua - rakas - Tauno Karnala
- 1952: Kaikkien naisten monni - Alokas Nieminen
- 1953: Two Funny Guys - Säveltäjä Jussi Mäki
- 1953: The Millionaire Recruit - Vihuri
- 1954: Kovanaama - Reporter Esko Pekuri
- 1954: Laivaston monnit maissa - Maisteri Segerstråhle
- 1954: Putkinotko - Malakias
- 1955: Näkemiin Helena - Lennu
- 1955: Sankarialokas - Alokas Esko Sirola / legioonal. T. Smith / matr T. MacDonald
- 1955: Miss Eurooppaa metsästämässä - Antero W. Lintunen
- 1955: Villi Pohjola - Kapakkapianisti
- 1957: Vääpelin kauhu - Jaska
- 1957: Syntipukki - Frans Koikkalainen
- 1958: Asessorin naishuolet - Veikko Pajukivi
- 1958: Sotapojan heilat - Alokas Esko Puustinen
- 1959: Taas tapaamme Suomisen perheen - Olli Suominen
- 1960: Justus järjestää kaiken - Justus
- 1964: Bröllopsbesvär - Peddler
- 1966: Syskonbädd 1782 - Guest at the tavern
- 1968: Punahilkka - Matti - airline pilot
- 1969: Mumintrollet (TV Series) - Moomintroll
- 1976: Pyhä perhe - Paavo Mäkinen
- 1977: Pikku Kakkonen (TV Series) - Himself - the host
- 1978: The Adventures of Picasso - Sirkka's Father (uncredited)
- 1979: Linus eller Tegelhusets hemlighet - Antique Dealer
- 1979: Herr Puntila and His Servant Matti - Johannes Puntila
- 1980: Barna från Blåsjöfjället - Lasso-Lassi
- 1980: Det blir jul på Möllegården (TV Series) - Pixie
- 1982: Flight of the Eagle - Photographer
- 1984: The Clan – Tale of the Frogs - Siilipää
- 1984: Dirty Story - Private detective
- 1986: Flucht in den Norden
- 1986: Kuningas lähtee Ranskaan - The Stablemaster
- 1986: På liv och död - Sångare i tunnelbanan
- 1986: Näkemiin, hyvästi - Lauri Valve, Tuulan isä
- 1987: Lain ulkopuolella - Chairman of the Court
- 1988: The Glory and Misery of Human Life - Martti Hongisto
- 1989: Dårfinkar och dönickar (TV Mini-Series) - Morfar
- 1989: Tjurens år (TV Movie) - Onkel Jegor
- 1992: Mestari - Kalevi Suomalainen
- 1993: Macklean (TV Series) - Carl August Ehrensvärd
- 1993: Rosenbaum (TV Series) - Erik 'Lunkan' Lundkvist
- 1995: Vita lögner - Lindqvist
- 1995: Petri tårar - The Cripple
- 1999: Lapin kullan kimallus - Konrad Planting
- 2008: Thomas - Thomas
