= Jonna Järnefelt =

Finnish actress and singer

- Born: Irja Johanna Järnefelt; 3 October 1964 (age 61); Espoo, Finland
- Occupation: Actress
- Spouse: Asko Sarkola
- Children: 3

Irja Johanna "Jonna" Järnefelt (born 3 October 1964) is a Finnish actress and singer.

== Career ==
Järnefelt entered the Helsinki Theatre Academy right from high school in 1983. There, she began studying in the dance line. In her own words, a career as a professional dancer proved too demanding, both physically and mentally. She managed to switch to an acting career. She graduated from the HTA in 1988, after which she was attached to the Lilla Teatern.

In addition to theater, Järnefelt has starred in films and television series, including Jurism!, Formally Qualified, Easy Life, and Sincerely Yours in Cold Blood. She has portrayed several many well-known Finnish personalities, such as Ida Aalberg in the drama documentary If You Made Horses Jump in Her Stalls and Anneli Jäätteenmäki in The Prime Minister. In 2012, Järnefelt starred as a Lithuanian criminal in the Swedish crime film Johan Falk: Organizatsija Karayan.

== Personal life ==
Since 1990, Järnefelt has been married to actor Asko Sarkola. She has three daughters.
