= Jukka Linkola =

Finnish pianist and composer (born 1955)

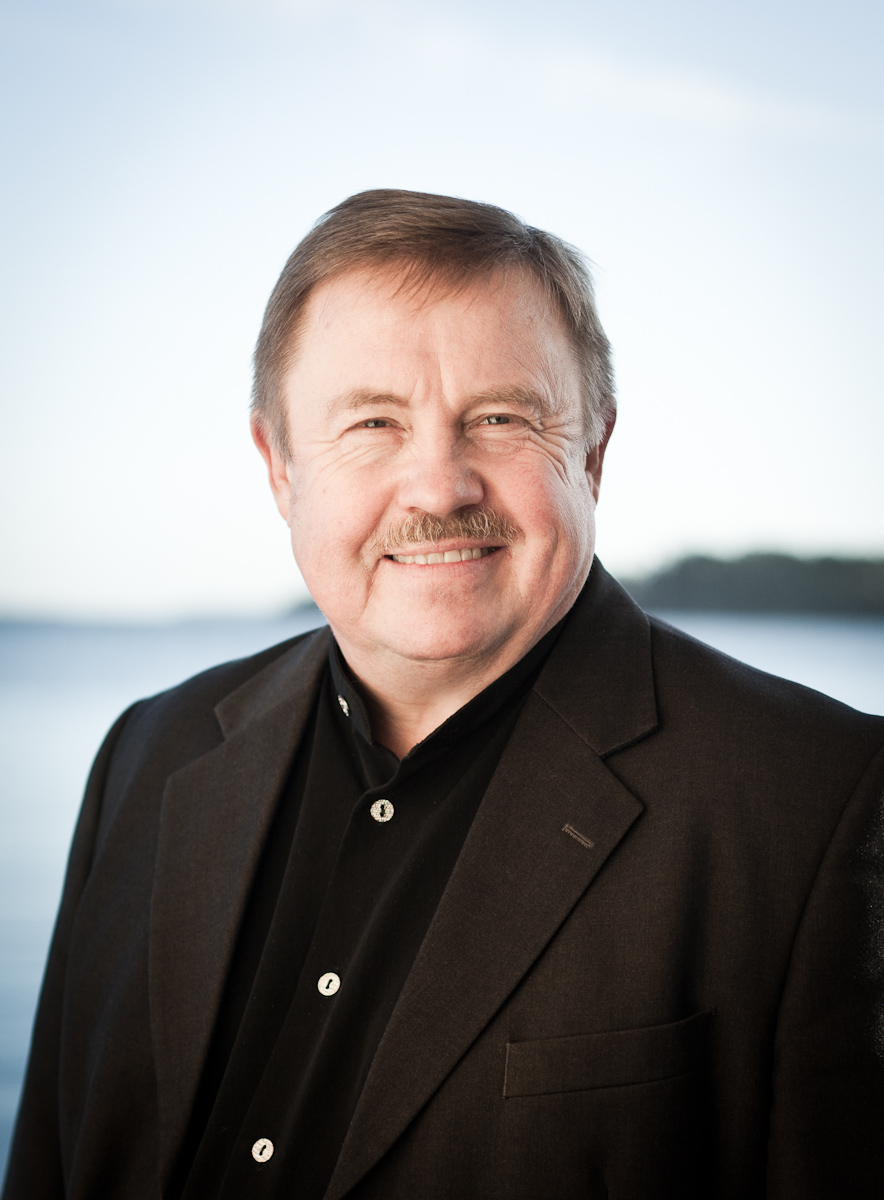
Jukka Linkola, 2015

Jukka Tapio Linkola (born 21 July 1955 in Espoo) is a Finnish jazz pianist, conductor and classical composer. He has composed music for the Finnish National Opera and led several jazz Big Bands. In addition he has won two Jussi awards for his film music, which another came from the 1988 film The Glory and Misery of Human Life. His euphonium concerto is considered a standard in the repertoire.

Linkola studied piano and music theory at the Sibelius Academy from 1972 to 1980. He later worked as a member of the music faculty at that institution, and has taught on the music faculty at the Metropolia University of Applied Sciences. From 1979 to 1992 he was employed as a conductor at the Helsinki City Theatre. His surrealist television opera Angelika (1990) won the 1993 Paris Opera Screen competition and the 1994 Cannes Midem Award. He has also written the scores to several musicals, and has written a variety of music; including orchestral works, choral music, chamber music, jazz music for big band, and songs.
