= William Miller (sound engineer) =

British sound engineer

- Occupation: Sound engineer

William Miller is a British sound engineer. He was nominated for an Academy Award in the category Best Sound for the film News of the World.

== Selected filmography ==
- News of the World (2020; co-nominated with Oliver Tarney, Mike Prestwood Smith and John Pritchett)
