= Mark Taylor (sound engineer) =

British sound effects mixer

- Born: 1 December 1966 (age 59); Farnborough, London, England
- Occupation: sound mixer
- Years active: 1994-present

Mark Taylor (born 1 December 1966) is a sound effects mixer and re-recording mixer.

Taylor has won two Primetime Emmy Awards. The first in 2000 for his work on RKO 281, and his second in 2002 for Band of Brothers: Carentan. In 2014, Taylor and his fellow sound mixers were nominated for an Academy Award for Best Sound Mixing for the 2013 film Captain Phillips. Taylor was nominated again at the 88th Academy Awards for the film The Martian. In 2020, he received his third Academy Award nomination and first win for Best Sound Mixing for the 2019 film, 1917, at the 92nd Academy Awards. He received further nominations, this time in the category of Best Sound, for his work on No Time to Die (2021) and Top Gun: Maverick (2022), winning his second Academy Award for the latter. He was nominated again for Best Sound for his work on Mission: Impossible – Dead Reckoning Part One (2023).

== Awards and nominations ==
=== Academy Awards ===
Year	Nominated work	Category	Result	Ref.
2014	Captain Phillips	Best Sound Mixing	Nominated	
2016	The Martian	Best Sound Mixing	Nominated	
2020	1917	Best Sound Mixing	Won	
2022	No Time to Die	Best Sound	Nominated	
2023	Top Gun: Maverick	Best Sound	Won	
2024	Mission: Impossible – Dead Reckoning Part One	Best Sound	Nominated	

=== British Academy Film Awards ===
Year	Nominated work	Category	Result	Ref.
2007	Casino Royale	Best Sound	Won	
2009	Quantum of Solace	Best Sound	Nominated	
2014	Captain Phillips	Best Sound	Nominated	
2016	The Martian	Best Sound	Nominated	
2020	1917	Best Sound	Won	
2022	No Time to Die	Best Sound	Nominated	
2023	Top Gun: Maverick	Best Sound	Nominated	
2024	Mission: Impossible – Dead Reckoning Part One	Best Sound	Nominated	

=== Satellite Awards ===
Year	Nominated work	Category	Result	Ref.
2007	The Golden Compass	Best Sound	Nominated	
2008	Quantum of Solace	Best Sound	Nominated	
2013	Captain Phillips	Best Sound	Nominated	
2015	The Martian	Best Sound	Won	
2019	1917	Best Sound	Nominated	
2022	Top Gun: Maverick	Best Sound	Won	
