= Herr Puntila and His Servant Matti (1979 film) =

1979 film

- Directed by: Ralf Långbacka
- Written by: Bertolt Brecht (play Mr Puntila and his Man Matti); Ralf Långbacka; Hella Wuolijoki
- Produced by: Anssi Mänttäri
- Starring: Lasse Pöysti
- Cinematography: Heikki Katajisto
- Release date: 21 December 1979
- Running time: 112 minutes
- Countries: Finland; Sweden
- Language: Swedish

Herr Puntila and His Servant Matti (Swedish: Herr Puntila och hans dräng Matti) is a 1979 Finnish-Swedish drama film directed by Ralf Långbacka. The film was selected as the Swedish entry for the Best Foreign Language Film at the 53rd Academy Awards, but was not accepted as a nominee. The film is based on the 1948 play Mr Puntila and His Man Matti by Bertolt Brecht which in turn is based on the 1940 Finnish play The Sawdust Princess by Hella Wuolijoki.

== Cast ==
- Lasse Pöysti as Johannes Puntila
- Pekka Laiho as Matti Aaltonen
- Arja Saijonmaa as Eeva Puntila
- Martin Kurtén as Attaché Eino Silakka
- May Pihlgren as Dean's wife
- Sven Ehrström as Fredrik
- Rolf Labbart as Dairy manager
- Tauno Lehtihalmes as Dean
- Ritva Valkama as Emma Takinainen
- Elina Salo as Chemistry clerk
- Pirkko Nurmi as Liisu

== See also ==
- List of submissions to the 53rd Academy Awards for Best Foreign Language Film
- List of Swedish submissions for the Academy Award for Best Foreign Language Film
