= Willie D. Burton =

American production sound mixer

- Burton in 2026
- Born: Tuscaloosa, Alabama, USA
- Occupation: Sound engineer
- Years active: 1975 – present

Willie D. Burton is an American production sound mixer. His career has spanned five decades and has included films such as The Shawshank Redemption, Se7en, and Indiana Jones and the Last Crusade. Burton has been nominated for the Academy Award for Best Sound or Best Achievement in Sound Mixing a total of eight times, winning twice; he has been nominated for two BAFTA Film Awards for Best Sound, winning once; and he was nominated for one Emmy Award for Outstanding Achievement in Film Sound Mixing for his work on Roots.

== Early life ==
Willie D. Burton was born in Tuscaloosa, Alabama. Burton grew up in Alabama, and became fascinated with broadcasting because he lived near a radio station. While attending high school, Burton entered a work-study program in a store that sold and repaired radios and TVs. He became experienced repairing radios, and began to experiment with improving and learning more about the electronics. His attention then moved to sound and sound mixing. His work at the electronic shop fed Burton's fascination with electronics and sound, but he was obstructed by the limited opportunities for African-Americans to work in the field, especially in the Deep South. In the midst of the Civil Rights Movement, Alabama was slow in its movement toward equality in job opportunities. As his motivation and interest grew, Burton made the decision to move to Long Beach, California after high school graduation. Burton attended a trade school and then Compton City College, where he studied electronics technology.

== Career ==
After graduating from Compton City College, Burton worked on sonar technology for the Department of the Navy, but his ultimate goal was to work in broadcasting. He was prevented from accomplishing this goal because he needed to be a union member to work in Hollywood. Finally, in 1969, he made it into the International Sound Technicians union. Burton was the first black man to be officially accepted into the union. This led to an entry-level job on the TV series Land of the Giants. Between TV jobs, which also included work as a boom operator on Medical Center and Gunsmoke, Burton worked as a custodian at a bank.

A friend from one of his TV jobs helped train Burton on sound-mixing equipment. Burton gained an immense amount of interest in sound mixing as he developed and polished his talents. Those who worked with him in Hollywood soon recognized his potential. Burton's big break into the sound-mixing world came in 1975, when he heard that Sidney Poitier was directing the film Let's Do It Again, with Bill Cosby. Poitier agreed to hire Burton. This decision launched him into a career that has spanned five decades. He also became part of the Cinema Audio Society. Burton's Academy Award win for Bird made him the first black person to win an Academy Award for Sound Mixing.

In October 2026, he received the honorary spike at the 71st Valladolid International Film Festival.

== Accolades ==
Burton holding his honorary spike at the 2026 Seminci

- Oppenheimer (2023)

Oscar – Nominated – Best Sound

- Dreamgirls (2006)

Oscar - Won - Best Sound Mixing
Cinema Audio Society - Won - Outstanding Sound Mixing for Motion Pictures
Satellite Award - Won - Best Sound (Editing & Mixing)

- The Green Mile (1999)

Oscar - Nominated - Best Sound Mixing

- The Shawshank Redemption (1994)

Oscar - Nominated - Best Sound Mixing

- In the Line of Fire (1993)

Cinema Audio Society - Nominated - Outstanding Sound Mixing for a Feature Film

- Bird (1988)

Oscar - Won - Best Sound Mixing
BAFTA Film Award - Nominated - Best Sound

- WarGames (1983)

Oscar - Nominated - Best Sound Mixing
BAFTA Film Award - Won - Best Sound

- Altered States (1980)

Oscar - Nominated - Best Sound Mixing

- The Buddy Holly Story (1978)

Oscar - Nominated - Best Sound Mixing

- Roots: Part 4 (1977)

Primetime Emmy - Nominated - Outstanding Film Sound Mixing
