= Erik Pöysti (director) =

Finnish director (born 1955)

- Born: 20 August 1955; Helsinki, Finland
- Occupation: Director
- Children: Alma; Oskar
- Parents: Lasse Pöysti; Birgitta Ulfsson

Erik Pöysti (Finnish: [ˈeːrik ˈpøy̯sti]; born 20 August 1955) is a Finnish film director and actor.

== Education and career ==
Pöysti studied at the University of Helsinki between 1975 and 1976. He worked at the Swedish Theatre during the early 1980s before moving onto the Lilla Teatern. In more recent years he has worked as a theatre teacher.

== Personal life ==
Pöysti is the son of Finnish actors Lasse Pöysti and Birgitta Ulfsson. He is a Swedish-speaking Finn, and he is of Finnish Karelian descent through his father. He currently lives in Ekenäs. His daughter Alma Pöysti is an actress and his son Oskar Pöysti is an actor.

== Filmography ==
- Breaking Out (1982)
- Kiertue (1982)
