= Algot Untola =

Finnish writer and journalist

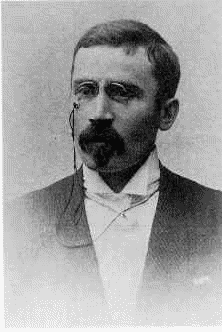
Algot Untola.

Algot Untola (28 November 1868 – 21 May 1918) was a Finnish writer and journalist.

Untola was born in Tohmajärvi, to the Tietäväinen family, and his real name was Algoth, but he changed the name to Algot Untola. Untola had many pen names including Irmari Rantamala, Maiju Lassila, Algoth Tietäväinen, Väinö Stenberg, J.I. Vatanen, Liisan-Antti and Jussi Porilainen. Untola's profession was teaching. He graduated in 1891 from Sortavala. Untola's most famous books were Harhama (1909) which he wrote under the name Irmari Rantamala, and Tulitikkuja lainaamassa (1910) under the name Maiju Lassila. Untola refused to accept the state literature prize which he had been awarded for the books.

Untola first supported the Finnish Party but he didn't agree with their views and he changed his party to Social Democratic Party of Finland. During the Finnish Civil War in 1918 he actively supported the Red side as a newspaper editor. He was arrested by White troops after the Battle of Helsinki and shot dead on 21 May 1918 in Helsinki on a transport of rebel prisoners to the Suomenlinna prison camp.
