= Kaivo =

- Directed by: Pekka Lehto
- Written by: Outi Nyytäjä
- Starring: Merja Larivaara
- Cinematography: Esa Vuorinen
- Edited by: Arturas Pozdniakovas
- Music by: Anssi Tikanmäki
- Release dates: 12 September 1992 (Venice); 29 September 1992 (Finland)
- Running time: 109 minutes
- Country: Finland
- Language: Finnish

Kaivo (The Well) is a 1992 Finnish drama film directed by Pekka Lehto and starring by Merja Larivaara. It was entered into the competition at the 49th Venice International Film Festival. As of 2010, Kaivo is the all-time twelfth most expensive Finnish film.

== Plot ==
Based on a true story, the film is about a young farm hostess (Merja Larivaara), who, due to her depression and mental illness, ends up drowning her two children in a well.
