= John Pritchett (sound engineer) =

American sound engineer

John Patrick Pritchett, C.A.S.
- Born: March 29, 1947 (age 79); Santa Monica, California, United States
- Occupation: Sound engineer
- Years active: 1981–present
- Spouse: Laura Derrick (m. 1989)

John Pritchett (born March 29, 1947) is an American sound engineer for film. He has been nominated for two Academy Awards in the category Best Sound for the films Road to Perdition and Memoirs of a Geisha. He was nominated for two Cinema Audio Society Awards, winning best sound on The Road to Perdition. He was also nominated for a BAFTA Award for his work on There Will Be Blood. He has worked on over 100 films and television series since 1981, and is known for his work on such films as Dirty Dancing, Magnolia, There Will Be Blood and The Amazing Spider-Man.

== Notable filmography ==
- Wyatt Earp (1994) -Production Sound Mixer
- Born to Be Wild (1995)
- Road to Perdition (2002) -Production Sound Mixer
- Sin City (2005) -Production Sound Mixer
- Memoirs of a Geisha (2005) -Production Mixer
- World Trade Center (2006) -Sound Mixer
- Dan in Real Life (2007) -Production Sound Mixer
- There Will Be Blood (2007) -Sound Mixer
- The Green Hornet (2011) -Production (Sound) Mixer
- The Amazing Spiderman (2012) -Production (Sound) Mixer
- Avengers: Endgame (2019) - Sound Mixer

== Personal life ==
Prior to his work in the film and television sound industry, Pritchett played drums, but eventually opened a recording studio with a friend. This work allowed him to transition to freelance sound engineering. His place in the field of film sound was best solidified by his early collaborations with director Robert Altman. Pritchett worked on a total of seven projects with Altman, prior to the latter's death in 2006.
