= Alma Pöysti =

Finnish actress (born 1981)

- Born: Alma Ilona Pöysti; 16 March 1981 (age 45); Helsinki, Finland
- Occupation: Actress
- Father: Erik Pöysti
- Relatives: Lasse Pöysti (grandfather); Birgitta Ulfsson (grandmother)

Alma Ilona Pöysti (Finnish: [ˈɑlmɑ ˈpøy̯sti]; born 16 March 1981) is a Finnish actress. She is the daughter of director Erik Pöysti and granddaughter of Finnish actors Lasse Pöysti and Birgitta Ulfsson. Pöysti is a Swedish-speaking Finn, and she has also lived and worked in Sweden.

In 2023, she was nominated for the Golden Globe Award for Best Actress – Motion Picture Comedy or Musical for Fallen Leaves.

== Biography ==
Pöysti studied at the University of the Arts Helsinki from 2003 to 2007, then worked at the Swedish Theatre and the Finnish National Theatre.

In 2020, she played the bisexual painter and author of the Moomin books Tove Jansson in a biopic titled Tove, directed by Zaida Bergroth.

== Filmography ==
=== Film ===
Year	Title	Role	Notes
2011	Where Once We Walked	Aina Gadolin	Cut-down film version of the TV series
2012	Naked Harbour	Marika	
2012	Animal Day	Singer	Short
2014	Moomins on the Riviera	Snorkmaiden (voice)	Finnish version
2015	Tsamo	Alisa	
2015	Det går att operera	Tina	Short
2016	Flowers of Evil	Laura	
2020	Explosionen av en badring	Linda	Short
2020	Tove	Tove Jansson	
2023	Four Little Adults	Juulia	
2023	Fallen Leaves	Ansa	
2023	A Day and a Half	Louise	
2023	Comet in Moominland	Snorkmaiden (voice)	2020 remaster
2024	Deck 5B (Däck 5B)	Mia	Short
2025	Rörelser	Lisa	

=== Television ===
Year	Title	Role	Notes
2004	Fling	Alva	Episode: "Soffan"
2011	Where Once We Walked	Aina Gadolin	
2013	Dagmamman	Inka	TV movie
2014	Kristuksen morsian	Laura	TV movie
2014	Luolasto		TV movie
2018	Liberty	Tita	Miniseries
2020	Tre berättelser om längtan		TV Movie segment: "Shukran habibi"
2022	Helsinki Crimes	Hietanen	8 episodes
2023	Blackwater	Ylja Happolati (1973)	Miniseries

== Accolades ==
Awards and nominations for Alma Pöysti
Award	Date of ceremony	Category	Film	Result	Ref.
Astra Film Awards	6 January 2024	Best International Actress	Fallen Leaves	Nominated	
European Film Awards	9 December 2023	Best Actress	Fallen Leaves	Nominated	
Golden Globe Awards	7 January 2024	Best Actress in a Motion Picture – Comedy or Musical	Fallen Leaves	Nominated	
Gothenburg Film Festival	5 February 2023	Dragon Award for Best Acting	Four Little Adults	Won	
Jussi Awards	15 September 2021	Best Actress	Tove	Won	
