= Doug Hemphill =

American sound engineer

- Occupation: Sound engineer
- Years active: 1979–present

Doug Hemphill is an American sound engineer. He won three Academy Awards for Academy Award for Best Sound and was nominated for eight more in the same category. He has worked on more than 190 films since 1979.

== Selected filmography ==
Hemphill has won three Academy Award for Best Sound and has been nominated for another nine:

Won

- The Last of the Mohicans (1992)
- Dune (2021)
- Dune: Part Two (2024)

Nominated

- Dick Tracy (1990)
- Geronimo: An American Legend (1993)
- Air Force One (1997)
- The Insider (1999)
- Master and Commander: The Far Side of the World (2003)
- Walk the Line (2005)
- Life of Pi (2012)
- Blade Runner 2049 (2017)
