= Primetime Emmy Award for Outstanding Sound Mixing for a Comedy or Drama Series (One-Hour) =

Television award category

Primetime Emmy Award for Sound Mixing for a Comedy or Drama Series (One-Hour)
- Awarded for: Outstanding Sound Mixing for a Comedy or Drama Series (One-Hour)
- Country: United States
- Presented by: Academy of Television Arts & Sciences
- Currently held by: Pluribus (2026)
- Website: emmys.com

The Primetime Emmy Award for Outstanding Sound Mixing for a Comedy or Drama Series (One-Hour) is an award handed out annually at the Creative Arts Emmy Awards. Prior to 1983, regular series competed alongside limited series and movies for Outstanding Achievement in Film Sound Mixing.

In the following list, the first titles listed in gold are the winners; those not in gold are nominees, which are listed in alphabetical order. The years given are those in which the ceremonies took place:

== Winners and nominations ==
=== 1970s ===
Outstanding Achievement in Film Sound Mixing

Year	Program	Episode	Nominees	Network
1970 (22nd)
1970 (22nd)	Mission: Impossible		Gordon L. Day, Dominick Gaffey	CBS
1970 (22nd)	First Tuesday		Roger Gary Andrews	NBC
1970 (22nd)	My Sweet Charlie		Roger Heman Jr., Melvin M. Metcalfe Sr., Clarence Self, John Stransky Jr.	NBC
1971 (23rd)
1971 (23rd)	Tribes		Theodore Soderberg	ABC
1971 (23rd)	Mannix		Joel Moss, Don Rush	CBS
1971 (23rd)	San Francisco International Airport		Robert Hoyt, Roger Parish	NBC
1971 (23rd)	Vanished		James Z. Flaster, Ronald Pierce	NBC
1972 (24th)
1972 (24th)	Fireball Forward		Richard Overton, Theodore Soderberg	ABC
1972 (24th)	Brian's Song		William J. Montague, Alfred E. Overton	ABC
1972 (24th)	The Undersea World of Jacques Cousteau		Roy Granville, Eddie J. Nelson, George E. Porter	ABC
1973 (25th)
1973 (25th)	Surrender at Appomattox: Appointment with Destiny		Fred Leroy Granville, Eddie J. Nelson, George E. Porter, Richard J. Wagner	CBS
1973 (25th)	That Certain Summer		Melvin M. Metcalfe Sr., Thom K. Piper	ABC
1973 (25th)	The Undersea World of Jacques Cousteau		Hoppy Mehterian, Eddie J. Nelson, George E. Porter	ABC

Outstanding Achievement in Film or Tape Sound Mixing

Year	Program	Episode	Nominees	Network
1974 (26th)
1974 (26th)	Pueblo		Albert A. Gramaglia, Michael Shindler	ABC
1974 (26th)	The Autobiography of Miss Jane Pittman		Charles T. Knight, Don Minkler	CBS
1974 (26th)	The Execution of Private Slovik		John K. Kean, Thom K. Piper	ABC
1975 (27th)
1975 (27th)	The American Film Institute Salute to James Cagney		Marshall King	CBS
1975 (27th)	The Missiles of October		Doug Nelson	ABC
1975 (27th)	Wide World in Concert		Doug Nelson, Norm Schwartz	ABC

Outstanding Achievement in Film Sound Mixing

Year	Program	Episode	Nominees	Network
1976 (28th)
1976 (28th)	Eleanor and Franklin		Don Bassman, Donald F. Johnson	ABC
1976 (28th)	Sanburg's Lincoln		Robert L. Harman, Charles Lewis, Eddie J. Nelson, George E. Porter	NBC
1977 (29th)
1977 (29th)	The Savage Bees		Alan Bernard, Robert L. Harman, Eddie J. Nelson, George E. Porter	NBC
1977 (29th)	Eleanor and Franklin: The White House Years		Don MacDougall, Richard Portman, David M. Ronne, Curly Thirlwell	ABC
1977 (29th)	Roots	"Part 1"	Richard Portman, David M. Ronne, Don MacDougall, Curly Thirlwell	ABC
1977 (29th)	Roots	"Part 4"	Willie D. Burton, George E. Porter, Eddie J. Nelson, Robert L. Harman	ABC
1977 (29th)	Roots	"Part 7"	Hoppy Mehterian, George E. Porter, Eddie J. Nelson, Arnold Braun	ABC
1977 (29th)	Roots	"Part 8"	George E. Porter, Eddie J. Nelson, Robert L. Harman, Arnold Braun	ABC
1978 (30th)
1978 (30th)	Young Joe, the Forgotten Kennedy		Robert L. Harman, Eddie J. Nelson, George E. Porter, William Teague	ABC
1978 (30th)	Having Babies II		Alan Bernard, Hoppy Mehterian, Eddie J. Nelson, George E. Porter	ABC
1978 (30th)	In the Matter of Karen Ann Quinlan		Hoppy Mehterian, Eddie J. Nelson, George E. Porter, Tommy Thompson	NBC
1978 (30th)	See How She Runs		Eddie J. Nelson, J. Robert Pettis, George E. Porter, Cabell Smith	CBS
1978 (30th)	A Sensitive, Passionate Man		Dean Hodges, Hoppy Mehterian, Eddie J. Nelson, George E. Porter	NBC
1978 (30th)	Tarantulas: The Deadly Cargo		Eddie Knowles, Eddie J. Nelson, J. Robert Pettis, George E. Porter	CBS
1979 (31st)
1979 (31st)	The Winds of Kitty Hawk		Eddie J. Nelson, George E. Porter, Bill Teague, Ray West	NBC
1979 (31st)	A Christmas to Remember		Stanley P. Gordon, Hoppy Mehterian, Eddie J. Nelson, George E. Porter	CBS
1979 (31st)	Ike	"Part 2"	Hoppy Mehterian, Eddie J. Nelson, George E. Porter, Bill Teague	ABC
1979 (31st)	The Triangle Factory Fire Scandal		Maury Harris, Eddie J. Nelson, George E. Porter, Ray West	NBC

=== 1980s ===
Year	Program	Episode	Nominees	Network
1980 (32nd)
1980 (32nd)	The Ordeal of Dr. Mudd		Ray Barons, David E. Campbell, Bob Pettis, John T. Reitz	CBS
1980 (32nd)	Amber Waves		Christopher Large, Eddie J. Nelson, George E. Porter, Terry Porter	ABC
1980 (32nd)	The Golden Moment: An Olympic Love Story		Robert W. Glass Jr., Patrick Mitchell, Robert Thirlwell, John Wilkenson	NBC
1980 (32nd)	Guyana Tragedy: The Story of Jim Jones		David E. Campbell, Jacque Nosco, Bob Pettis, John T. Reitz	CBS
1980 (32nd)	Skag	"Pilot"	David E. Dockendorf, Robert L. Harman, William L. McCaughey, Jack Solomon	NBC
1981 (33rd)
1981 (33rd)	Evita Peron	"Part 1"	Robert L. Harman, William McCaughey, William R. Teague, Howard Wollman	NBC
1981 (33rd)	Baby Comes Home		Alan Bernard, Robert L. Harman, William McCaughey, Howard Wollman	CBS
1981 (33rd)	The Bunker		Robert L. Harman, Rene Magnol, William McCaughey, Howard Wollman	CBS
1981 (33rd)	Dial "M" for Murder		Stanley P. Gordon, Robert L. Harman, William McCaughey, Lee Minkler	NBC
1981 (33rd)	Hart to Hart	"'Tis the Season to Be Murdered"	Robert L. Harman, William L. McCaughey, Blake Wilcox, Howard Wollman	ABC
1981 (33rd)	The Killing of Randy Webster		Robert L. Harman, William L. McCaughey, Richard Raguse, Howard Wollman	CBS
1981 (33rd)	Nero Wolfe	"Gambit"	Gary Bourgeois, Nick Gaffey, Lee Minkler, Terry Porter	NBC
1981 (33rd)	A Rumor of War		Harry Alphin, Manuel Topete Blake, Robert L. Harman, William McCaughey	CBS
1981 (33rd)	A Time for Miracles		Joel Fein, George E. Porter, William R. Teague, Howard Wollman	ABC
1981 (33rd)	Word of Honor		Robert L. Harman, John MacLeod, William L. McCaughey, Terry Porter	CBS
1982 (34th)
1982 (34th)	Hill Street Blues	"Personal Foul"	Bill Marky, Robert W. Glass Jr., Bill Nicholson, Howard Wilmarth	NBC
1982 (34th)	Fire on the Mountain		Thomas Causey, David J. Hudson, Mel Metcalfe, Ray West	NBC
1982 (34th)	Hill Street Blues	"The Second Oldest Profession"	Bill Marky, Don Cahn, Jim Cook, Robert L. Harman	NBC
1982 (34th)	A Woman Called Golda		Eli Yarkoni, Don Cahn, Jim Cook, Robert L. Harman	Syndicated
1982 (34th)	World War III		Jacques Nosco, Don Cahn, Jim Cook, Robert L. Harman	NBC

Outstanding Film Sound Mixing for a Series

Year	Program	Episode	Nominees	Network
1983 (35th)
1983 (35th)	Hill Street Blues	"Trial by Fury"	Bill Marky, John Asman, Bill Nicholson, Ken S. Polk	NBC
1983 (35th)	The A-Team	"Pilot"	Jim Cook, Robert L. Harman, John Norman, 'Fast' Eddie Mahler	NBC
1983 (35th)	Cagney & Lacey	"Recreational Use"	Maury Harris, John Asman, Bill Nicholson, Ken S. Polk	CBS
1983 (35th)	Magnum, P.I.	"Did You See the Sunrise?"	James F. Rogers, T.A. Moore Jr., Earl Madery, B. Tennyson Sebastian II	CBS
1983 (35th)	St. Elsewhere	"The Count"	Dean Vernon, John Asman, Bill Nicholson, Ken S. Polk	NBC
1983 (35th)	Tales of the Gold Monkey	"Pilot"	Jim Cook, Robert L. Harman, John Norman, 'Fast' Eddie Mahler	ABC
1984 (36th)
1984 (36th)	Hill Street Blues	"Parting Is Such Sweep Sorrow"	David Schneiderman, John Asman, Bill Nicholson, Ken S. Polk	NBC
1984 (36th)	The A-Team	"Welcome Back Range Rider"	'Fast' Eddie Mahler, Jim Cook, Robert L. Harman, John Norman	NBC
1984 (36th)	Cagney & Lacey	"Bounty Hunter"	Maury Harris, John Asman, Bill Nicholson, Ken S. Polk	CBS
1984 (36th)	Falcon Crest	"The Avenger"	Eddie Knowles, John L. Anderson, Doug Davey, Chris Haire	CBS
1984 (36th)	Hill Street Blues	"Praise Dilaudid"	Bill Marky, John Asman, Bill Nicholson, Ken S. Polk	NBC
1985 (37th)
1985 (37th)	Cagney & Lacey	"Heat"	Maury Harris, John Asman, Bill Nicholson, Ken S. Polk	CBS
1985 (37th)	Hill Street Blues	"Queen for a Day"	James Pilcher, John Asman, Bill Nicholson, Ken S. Polk	NBC
1985 (37th)	Hill Street Blues	"The Rise and Fall of Paul the Wall"	Sunny Meyer, John Asman, Bill Nicholson, Ken S. Polk	NBC
1985 (37th)	St. Elsewhere	"Sweet Dreams"	Dean Vernon, John Asman, Bill Nicholson, Ken S. Polk	NBC

Outstanding Sound Mixing for a Drama Series

Year	Program	Episode	Nominees	Network
1986 (38th)
1986 (38th)	St. Elsewhere	"Time Heals, Part 2"	William Gazecki, Andy MacDonald, Bill Nicholson, Blake Wilcox	NBC
1986 (38th)	Falcon Crest	"The Cataclysm"	John Asman, Eddie Knowles, Andy MacDonald, Ken S. Polk	CBS
1986 (38th)	Hill Street Blues	"Iced Coffey"	John 'Pee Wee' Carter, William Gazecki, Andy MacDonald, Bill Nicholson	NBC
1986 (38th)	Miami Vice	"Florence Italy"	Rick Alexander, Anthony Constantini, Daniel J. Leahy, Michael R. Tromer	NBC
1986 (38th)	Murder, She Wrote	"A Lady in the Lake"	James L. Aicholtz, Tim Cooney, Doc Kane, Rocky Moriana Jr.	CBS
1986 (38th)	Our Family Honor	"Cat and Mouse"	John Asman, Tim Philben, Ken S. Polk, John Speak	ABC
1987 (39th)
1987 (39th)	Max Headroom	"Blipverts"	Gary Alexander, Joe Kenworthy, Tim Philben, Bill Thiederman	ABC
1987 (39th)	Crime Story	"Pilot"	Alan Bernard, Randy McDonald, Bill Nicholson, Dean Okrand	NBC
1987 (39th)	Hill Street Blues	"It Ain't Over Till It's Over"	William Gazecki, Bill Nicholson, Peter Reale, Dean Vernon	NBC
1987 (39th)	L.A. Law	"Pilot"	Dan Dillon, John Norman, David Schneiderman, Theodore Soderberg	NBC
1987 (39th)	Moonlighting	"Atomic Shakespeare"	Martin Raymond Bolger, David J. Hudson, Mel Metcalfe, Terry Porter	ABC
1988 (40th)
1988 (40th)	Tour of Duty	"Under Siege"	Susan Moore-Chong, Thomas J. Huth, Tim Philben, Sam Black	CBS
1988 (40th)	L.A. Law	"Leapin' Lizards"	David Schneiderman, Sergio Reyes, Robert Appere, David Dockendorf	NBC
1988 (40th)	Magnum, P.I.	"Resolution"	William L. McCaughey, Doug Botnick, Paul Wells, Stan Gordon	CBS
1988 (40th)	Miami Vice	"Like a Hurricane"	Ray West, Joseph D. Citarella, Grover B. Helsley, Joe Foglia	NBC
1988 (40th)	Star Trek: The Next Generation	"Where No One Has Gone Before"	Chris Haire, Doug Davey, Jerry Clemans, Alan Bernard	Syndicated
1989 (41st)
1989 (41st)	Star Trek: The Next Generation	"Q Who"	Chris Haire, Doug Davey, Richard L. Morrison, Alan Bernard	Syndicated
1989 (41st)	China Beach	"Vets"	Tim Cooney, Don Cahn, Artie Torgersen, James G. Williams	ABC
1989 (41st)	Mission: Impossible	"Spy"	Tim Philben, Scott Millan, Clark Conrad, Paul Clark	ABC
1989 (41st)	Thirtysomething	"Michael Writes a Story"	Tim Philben, Scott Millan, Clark Conrad, Will Yarbrough	ABC
1989 (41st)	Tour of Duty	"I Wish It Would Rain"	Thomas J. Huth, Anthony Constantini, Sam Black, Susan Moore-Chong	CBS

=== 1990s ===
Year	Program	Episode	Nominees	Network
1990 (42nd)
1990 (42nd)	China Beach	"F.N.G."	Lowell Harris, Don Cahn, Artie Torgersen, Jim Cook	ABC
1990 (42nd)	L.A. Law	"The Mouse That Soared"	David Schneiderman, Sergio Reyes, Robert Appere, Kevin E. Carpenter	NBC
1990 (42nd)	Star Trek: The Next Generation	"Yesterday's Enterprise"	Alan Bernard, Doug Davey, Chris Haire, Richard L. Morrison	Syndicated
1990 (42nd)	Tour of Duty	"And Make Death Proud to Take Us"	Bud Maffett, Thomas J. Huth, Anthony Constantini, Sam Black	CBS
1991 (43rd)
1991 (43rd)	Star Trek: The Next Generation	"The Best of Both Worlds, Part 2"	Alan Bernard, Doug Davey, Chris Haire, Richard L. Morrison	Syndicated
1991 (43rd)	Cop Rock	"Oil of Ol'Lay"	Mark Server, Robert Appere, Ron Estes, Gary D. Rogers	ABC
1991 (43rd)	L.A. Law	"God Rest Ye Murray Gentleman"	David Schneiderman, Robert Appere, Ron Estes, Gary D. Rogers	NBC
1991 (43rd)	Northern Exposure	"Aurora Borealis: A Fairy Tale for Big People"	Glenn Micallef, Dean Okrand, Bill Thiederman, Mike Getlin	CBS
1991 (43rd)	Twin Peaks	"On the Wings of Love"	Don Summer, Gary Alexander, Adam Jenkins	ABC

Outstanding Individual Achievement in Sound Mixing for a Drama Series

Year	Program	Episode	Nominees	Network
1992 (44th)
1992 (44th)	The Young Indiana Jones Chronicles	"Verdun, 1916"	David Stephenson, Gary Summers	ABC
1992 (44th)	China Beach	"Hello-Goodbye"	Lowell Harris, Don Cahn, Artie Torgersen, Jim Cook	ABC
1992 (44th)	Northern Exposure	"Three Amigos"	Robert Marts, Gary Gegan, Anthony D'Amico, Peter Cole	CBS
1992 (44th)	Star Trek: The Next Generation	"The Next Phase"	Alan Bernard, Chris Haire, Richard L. Morrison, Doug Davey	Syndicated
1993 (45th)
1993 (45th)	Star Trek: The Next Generation	"A Fistful of Datas"	Alan Bernard, Doug Davey, Richard L. Morrison, Chris Haire	Syndicated
1993 (45th)	Dr. Quinn, Medicine Woman	"Pilot"	David M. Ronne, Dean Okrand, Bill Thiederman, Mike Getlin	CBS
1993 (45th)	Northern Exposure	"Kaddish for Uncle Manny"	Robert Marts, Glenn Micallef, Anthony D'Amico, Greg Orloff, R. Russell Smith	CBS
1993 (45th)	Star Trek: Deep Space Nine	"Emissary, Part 2"	William Gocke, Chris Haire, Richard L. Morrison, Doug Davey	Syndicated
1993 (45th)	The Young Indiana Jones Chronicles	"Young Indiana Jones and the Mystery of the Blues"	Carl Rudisill, Gary Summers	ABC
1994 (46th)
1994 (46th)	Star Trek: The Next Generation	"Genesis"	Alan Bernard, Chris Haire, Richard L. Morrison, Doug Davey	Syndicated
1994 (46th)	Northern Exposure	"Fish Story"	Robert Marts, Glenn Micallef, R. Russell Smith, Greg Orloff, Anthony D'Amico	CBS
1994 (46th)	NYPD Blue	"Guns & Rosaries"	Robert Appere, Kenneth R. Burton, Mark Server	ABC
1994 (46th)	NYPD Blue	"Pilot"	Mark Server, Dan Hiland, Robert Appere, Gary D. Rogers	ABC
1994 (46th)	The Young Indiana Jones Chronicles	"Young Indiana Jones and the Phantom Train of Doom"	Bruce White, Bob Edwards	ABC
1995 (47th)
1995 (47th)	ER	"Love's Labor Lost"	Russell C. Fager, Michael Jiron, Allen L. Stone, Franklin Jones Jr.	NBC
1995 (47th)	Chicago Hope	"Internal Affairs"	David Kirschner, Robert Appere, Kenneth R. Burton	CBS
1995 (47th)	Lois & Clark: The New Adventures of Superman	"Wall of Sound"	Kenn Fuller, Dan Hiland, Joseph D. Citarella	ABC
1995 (47th)	NYPD Blue	"Vishy Vashy Vinnie"	Joe Kenworthy, Robert Appere, Kenneth R. Burton	ABC
1995 (47th)	The Watcher	"The Human Condition"	David E. Fluhr, Sam Black, John Asman, Will Yarbrough	UPN

Outstanding Sound Mixing for a Drama Series

Year	Program	Episode	Nominees	Network
1996 (48th)
1996 (48th)	The X-Files	"Nisei"	Michael T. Williamson, David John West, Nello Torri, Doug E. Turner	Fox
1996 (48th)	American Gothic	"Damned If You Don't"	Richard Van Dyke, John Asman, David E. Fluhr, Sam Black	CBS
1996 (48th)	Chicago Hope	"Quiet Riot"	Russell C. Fager, R. Russell Smith, Greg Orloff	CBS
1996 (48th)	ER	"Hell and High Water"	Will Yarbrough, Allen L. Stone, Franklin Jones Jr., Michael Jiron	NBC
1996 (48th)	Lois & Clark: The New Adventures of Superman	"Don't Tug on Superman's Cape"	Kenn Fuller, Joseph D. Citarella, Dan Hiland	ABC
1996 (48th)	NYPD Blue	"Heavin' Can Wait"	Joe Kenworthy, Robert Appere, Kenneth R. Burton	ABC
1997 (49th)
1997 (49th)	ER	"Fear of Flying"	Lowell Harris, Allen L. Stone, Franklin Jones Jr., Michael Jiron	NBC
1997 (49th)	Law & Order	"D-Girl"	Bill Nicholson, Thomas Meloeny, David Platt	NBC
1997 (49th)	NYPD Blue	"Unembraceable You"	Joe Kenworthy, Robert Appere, Kenneth R. Burton	ABC
1997 (49th)	Star Trek: Voyager	"Future's End, Part 1"	Chris Haire, Richard L. Morrison, Doug Davey, Alan Bernard	UPN
1997 (49th)	The X-Files	"Tempus Fugit"	David John West, Nello Torri, Harry Andronis, Michael T. Williamson	Fox
1998 (50th)
1998 (50th)	Chicago Hope	"Brain Salad Surgery"	Russell C. Fager, R. Russell Smith, William Freesh	CBS
1998 (50th)	ER	"Ambush"	Lowell Harris, Ed Greene, Peter Baird, John Cevetello	NBC
1998 (50th)	ER	"Exodus"	Lowell Harris, Michael Jiron, Dave Concors, Allen L. Stone	NBC
1998 (50th)	NYPD Blue	"A Box of Wendy"	Joe Kenworthy, Robert Appere, Kenneth R. Burton	ABC
1998 (50th)	The X-Files	"The Red and the Black"	Michael T. Williamson, David John West, Harry Andronis, Kurt Kassulke	Fox
1999 (51st)
1999 (51st)	ER	"The Storm, Part 2"	Marc A. Gilmartin, Dave Concors, Michael Jiron, Allen L. Stone	NBC
1999 (51st)	Law & Order	"Empire"	David Platt, Thomas Meloeny, Bill Nicholson	NBC
1999 (51st)	NYPD Blue	"Raging Bulls"	Joe Kenworthy, J. Stanley Johnston, Elmo Ponsdomenech	ABC
1999 (51st)	The Practice	"Happily Ever After"	Clark King, Harry Andronis, David John West, Kurt Kassulke	ABC
1999 (51st)	The Sopranos	"A Hit Is a Hit"	Mathew Price, Todd Orr, Ron Evans, Adam Sawelson	HBO

=== 2000s ===
Year	Program	Episode	Nominees	Network
2000 (52nd)
2000 (52nd)	The X-Files	"First Person Shooter"	Steve Cantamessa, David John West, Harry Andronis, Ray O'Reilly	Fox
2000 (52nd)	ER	"All in the Family"	Marc A. Gilmartin, Michael Jiron, Dave Concors, Allen L. Stone	NBC
2000 (52nd)	Law & Order	"Gunshow"	David Platt, Bill Nicholson, Thomas Meloeny	NBC
2000 (52nd)	NYPD Blue	"Along Came Jones"	Joe Kenworthy, Elmo Ponsdomenech, J. Stanley Johnston	ABC
2000 (52nd)	The Sopranos	"D-Girl"	Mathew Price, Kevin Patrick Burns, Todd Orr, Tom Perry	HBO
2000 (52nd)	The West Wing	"In Excelsis Deo"	Kenneth B. Ross, Dan Hiland, Gary D. Rogers, Len Schmitz	NBC

Outstanding Single-Camera Sound Mixing for a Series

Year	Program	Episode	Nominees	Network
2001 (53rd)
2001 (53rd)	The West Wing	"In the Shadow of Two Gunmen, Part 2"	Mark Weingarten, Gary D. Rogers, Dan Hiland	NBC
2001 (53rd)	ER	"The Crossing"	James Clark, Michael Jiron, Dave Concors, Allen L. Stone	NBC
2001 (53rd)	Law & Order	"School Daze"	James Clark, Michael Jiron, Dave Concors, Allen L. Stone	NBC
2001 (53rd)	The Practice	"The Day After"	Clark King, David John West, Eric Clopein, David Dondorf	ABC
2001 (53rd)	The Sopranos	"Another Toothpick"	Mathew Price, Kevin Patrick Burns, Todd Orr, Fred Tator	HBO
2002 (54th)
2002 (54th)	ER	"Partly Cloudy, Chance of Rain"	James Clark, Michael Jiron, Dave Concors, Mike Brooks	NBC
2002 (54th)	CSI: Crime Scene Investigation	"Primum Non Nocere"	Yuri Reese, William Smith, Michael Fowler	CBS
2002 (54th)	NYPD Blue	"Johnny Got His Gold"	Joe Kenworthy, Pete Elia, J. Stanley Johnston	ABC
2002 (54th)	Six Feet Under	"Pilot"	Richard Van Dyke, Peter Reale, Roberta Doheny	HBO
2002 (54th)	24	"11:00 p.m. – 12:00 a.m."	Mike Olman, Ken Kobett, William Gocke	Fox
2003 (55th)
2003 (55th)	ER	"Chaos Theory"	Doug Davey, Adam Sawelson, Dave Concors, James Clark	NBC
2003 (55th)	CSI: Crime Scene Investigation	"Revenge Is Best Served Cold"	Yuri Reese, William Smith, Michael Fowler	CBS
2003 (55th)	The Sopranos	"Whoever Did This"	Kevin Patrick Burns, Todd Orr, Mathew Price	HBO
2003 (55th)	24	"10:00 p.m. – 11:00 p.m."	Mike Olman, Ken Kobett, William Gocke	Fox
2003 (55th)	The West Wing	"Twenty Five"	Gary D. Rogers, Dan Hiland, Patrick Hanson	NBC
2004 (56th)
2004 (56th)	24	"5:00 p.m. – 6:00 p.m."	Mike Olman, Ken Kobett, William Gocke	Fox
2004 (56th)	Alias	"Hourglass"	Robert Appere, Ed Carr, Douglas Axtell	ABC
2004 (56th)	CSI: Crime Scene Investigation	"Grissom vs. The Volcano"	Yuri Reese, William Smith, Michael Fowler	CBS
2004 (56th)	The Sopranos	"Irregular Around the Margins"	Kevin Patrick Burns, Todd Orr, Mathew Price	HBO
2004 (56th)	The West Wing	"Gaza"	Gary D. Rogers, Dan Hiland, Patrick Hanson	NBC
2005 (57th)
2005 (57th)	24	"6:00 a.m. – 7:00 a.m."	William Gocke, Mike Olman, Ken Kobett	Fox
2005 (57th)	CSI: Crime Scene Investigation	"Down the Drain"	Michael Fowler, Yuri Reese, William Smith	CBS
2005 (57th)	Deadwood	"A Lie Agreed Upon, Part 1"	Geoffrey Patterson, R. Russell Smith, William Freesh	HBO
2005 (57th)	Lost	"Outlaws"	Michael C. Moore, Scott Weber, Frank Morrone	ABC
2005 (57th)	The West Wing	"2162 Votes"	Patrick Hanson, Gary D. Rogers, Dan Hiland	NBC
2006 (58th)
2006 (58th)	Boston Legal	"Finding Nimmo"	Craig Hunter, Peter Kelsey, Clark King, William Butler	ABC
2006 (58th)	Battlestar Galactica	"Scattered"	Ken Kobett, Mike Olman, Rick Bal	Sci Fi
2006 (58th)	CSI: Crime Scene Investigation	"A Bullet Runs Through It"	Yuri Reese, William Smith, Michael Fowler	CBS
2006 (58th)	House	"Euphoria, Part 1"	Gerry Lentz, Rich Weingart, Russell C. Fager	Fox
2006 (58th)	Lost	"Live Together, Die Alone, Part 2"	David Yaffe, Sean Rush, Frank Morrone, Scott Weber	ABC
2006 (58th)	24	"7:00 a.m. – 8:00 a.m."	Mike Olman, Ken Kobett, William Gocke	Fox

Outstanding Sound Mixing for a Comedy or Drama Series (One-Hour)

Year	Program	Episode	Nominees	Network
2007 (59th)
2007 (59th)	CSI: Crime Scene Investigation	"Living Doll"	Michael Fowler, Yuri Reese, William Smith	CBS
2007 (59th)	Boston Legal	"Lincoln"	Clark King, David Rawlinson, Peter Kelsey	ABC
2007 (59th)	Deadwood	"A Two-Headed Beast"	Geoffrey Patterson, R. Russell Smith, William Freesh	HBO
2007 (59th)	Heroes	"Genesis"	Kenn Fuller, Gerry Lentz, Rich Weingart	NBC
2007 (59th)	The Sopranos	"Stage 5"	Mathew Price, Kevin Patrick Burns, Todd Orr	HBO
2007 (59th)	24	"10:00 p.m. – 11:00 p.m."	William Gocke, Ken Kobett, Mike Olman, Jeff Gomillion	Fox
2008 (60th)
2008 (60th)	Lost	"Meet Kevin Johnson"	Robert J. Anderson Jr., Frank Morrone, Scott Weber	ABC
2008 (60th)	Battlestar Galactica	"Razor"	Rick Bal, Mike Olman, Ken Kobett	Sci Fi
2008 (60th)	Boston Legal	"Beauty and the Beast"	Clark King, Peter Kelsey, David Rawlinson	ABC
2008 (60th)	Burn Notice	"Dead Drop"	Scott Clements, Sherry Klein, David Raines	USA
2008 (60th)	Dexter	"It's Alive!"	Patrick Hanson, Elmo Ponsdomenech, Joe Earle	Showtime
2009 (61st)
2009 (61st)	House	"House Divided"	Von Varga, Juan Cisneros, Gerry Lentz, Rich Weingart	Fox
2009 (61st)	Battlestar Galactica	"Daybreak, Part 2"	Rick Bal, Mike Olman, Ken Kobett	Syfy
2009 (61st)	Boston Legal	"Last Call"	Clark King, Peter Kelsey, David Rawlinson	ABC
2009 (61st)	Lost	"The Incident"	Robert J. Anderson Jr., Ken King, Scott Weber, Frank Morrone	ABC
2009 (61st)	24	"10:00 p.m. – 11:00 p.m."	William Gocke, Mike Olman, Ken Kobett	Fox

=== 2010s ===
Year	Program	Episode	Nominees	Network
2010 (62nd)
2010 (62nd)	Glee	"The Power of Madonna"	Phillip W. Palmer, Doug Andham, Joe Earle	Fox
2010 (62nd)	Dexter	"Hello, Dexter Morgan"	James Clark, Elmo Ponsdomenech, Kevin Roache, Jeremy Balko	Showtime
2010 (62nd)	House	"Epic Fail"	Von Varga, Juan Cisneros, Rich Weingart, Gerry Lentz	Fox
2010 (62nd)	Lost	"The End"	Robert J. Anderson Jr., Ken King, Frank Morrone, Scott Weber	ABC
2010 (62nd)	24	"3:00 p.m. – 4:00 p.m."	William Gocke, Mike Olman, Ken Kobett, Larold Rebhun	Fox
2011 (63rd)
2011 (63rd)	House	"Bombshells"	Von Varga, Joe DeAngelis, Brad North, Juan Cisneros	Fox
2011 (63rd)	Boardwalk Empire	"Boardwalk Empire"	Frank Stettner, Jeff Pullman, Tom Fleischman	HBO
2011 (63rd)	Burn Notice	"Last Stand"	Scott Clements, David Raines, Sherry Klein	USA
2011 (63rd)	Dexter	"Take It!"	Greg Agalsoff, Pete Elia, Kevin Roache, Jeremy Balko	Showtime
2011 (63rd)	Glee	"The Substitute"	Phillip W. Palmer, Joe Earle, Doug Andham	Fox
2011 (63rd)	Mad Men	"The Suitcase"	Peter Bentley, Ken Teaney, Todd Orr	AMC
2012 (64th)
2012 (64th)	Game of Thrones	"Blackwater"	Mathew Waters, Onnalee Blank, Ronan Hill, Mervyn Moore	HBO
2012 (64th)	Breaking Bad	"Face Off"	Darryl L. Frank, Jeffrey Perkins, Eric Justen	AMC
2012 (64th)	Downton Abbey	"Episode One"	Chris Ashworth, Nigel Heath, Alex Fielding, Oliver Brierley, Keith Partridge	PBS
2012 (64th)	Homeland	"Marine One"	Larry Long, Nello Torri, Alan Decker, Larold Rebhun	Showtime
2012 (64th)	Person of Interest	"Pilot"	Frank Morrone, Scott Weber, Keith Rogers, Noah Timan	CBS
2013 (65th)
2013 (65th)	Boardwalk Empire	"The Milkmaid's Lot"	Frank Stettner, Tom Fleischman, George A. Lara, Mark DeSimone	HBO
2013 (65th)	Breaking Bad	"Dead Freight"	Darryl L. Frank, Jeffrey Perkins, Eric Justen	AMC
2013 (65th)	Game of Thrones	"And Now His Watch Is Ended"	Ronan Hill, Richard Dyer, Onnalee Blank, Mathew Waters	HBO
2013 (65th)	Homeland	"Beirut Is Back"	Larry Long, Nello Torri, Alan Decker, Larold Rebhun	Showtime
2013 (65th)	Mad Men	"The Flood"	Peter Bentley, Ken Teaney, Alec St. John	AMC
2014 (66th)
2014 (66th)	House of Cards	"Chapter 14"	Lorenzo Millan, Nathan Nance, Scott R. Lewis	Netflix
2014 (66th)	Breaking Bad	"Felina"	Darryl L. Frank, Jeffrey Perkins, Eric Justen	AMC
2014 (66th)	Downton Abbey	"Episode Eight"	Alistair Crocker, Nigel Heath, Alex Fielding	PBS
2014 (66th)	Game of Thrones	"The Watchers on the Wall"	Ronan Hill, Richard Dyer, Onnalee Blank, Mathew Waters	HBO
2014 (66th)	Homeland	"Good Night"	Larry Long, Nello Torri, Alan Decker, Larold Rebhun	Showtime
2015 (67th)
2015 (67th)	Game of Thrones	"Hardhome"	Ronan Hill, Richard Dyer, Onnalee Blank, Mathew Waters	HBO
2015 (67th)	Better Call Saul	"Marco"	Phillip W. Palmer, Larry Benjamin, Kevin Valentine	AMC
2015 (67th)	Downton Abbey	"A Moorland Holiday"	David Lascelles, Nigel Heath, Kiran Marshall	PBS
2015 (67th)	Homeland	"Redux"	Diethard Keck, Nello Torri, Alan Decker, Larold Rebhun	Showtime
2015 (67th)	House of Cards	"Chapter 27"	Lorenzo Millan, Nathan Nance, Scott R. Lewis	Netflix
2016 (68th)
2016 (68th)	Game of Thrones	"Battle of the Bastards"	Ronan Hill, Richard Dyer, Onnalee Blank, Mathew Waters	HBO
2016 (68th)	Better Call Saul	"Klick"	Phillip W. Palmer, Larry Benjamin, Kevin Valentine	AMC
2016 (68th)	Downton Abbey	"Episode Nine"	David Lascelles, Nigel Heath	PBS
2016 (68th)	House of Cards	"Chapter 52"	Lorenzo Millan, Nathan Nance, Scott R. Lewis	Netflix
2016 (68th)	Mr. Robot	"eps1.5_br4ve-trave1er.asf"	Timothia Sellers, John W. Cook II, Bill Freesh, Andrew Morgado	USA
2016 (68th)	Ray Donovan	"Exsuscito"	Harrison Marsh, Robert Edmondson, R. Russell Smith	Showtime
2017 (69th)
2017 (69th)	Westworld	"The Bicameral Mind"	Keith Rogers, Scott Weber, Roger Stevenson, Kyle O'Neal	HBO
2017 (69th)	Better Call Saul	"Witness"	Larry Benjamin, Kevin Valentine, Phillip W. Palmer	AMC
2017 (69th)	House of Cards	"Chapter 53"	Nathan Nance, Scott R. Lewis, Lorenzo Millan	Netflix
2017 (69th)	Mr. Robot	"eps2.8_h1dden-pr0cess.axx"	John W. Cook II, Bill Freesh, William Sarokin, Paul Drenning	USA
2017 (69th)	Stranger Things	"Chapter Eight: The Upside Down"	Joe Barnett, Adam Jenkins, Chris Durfy, Bill Higley	Netflix
2018 (70th)
2018 (70th)	Game of Thrones	"Beyond the Wall"	Onnalee Blank, Mathew Waters, Richard Dyer, Ronan Hill	HBO
2018 (70th)	The Handmaid's Tale	"June"	Joe Morrow, Lou Solakofski, Sylvain Arseneault	Hulu
2018 (70th)	Mr. Robot	"eps3.4_runtime-error.r00"	John W. Cook II, Bill Freesh, Joe White, Paul Drenning	USA
2018 (70th)	Stranger Things	"Chapter Eight: The Mind Flayer"	Joe Barnett, Adam Jenkins, Michael P. Clark, Bill Higley	Netflix
2018 (70th)	Westworld	"Akane No Mai"	Andy King, Keith Rogers, Geoffrey Patterson	HBO
2019 (71st)
2019 (71st)	Game of Thrones	"The Long Night"	Onnalee Blank, Mathew Waters, Simon Kerr, Danny Crowley, Ronan Hill	HBO
2019 (71st)	Better Call Saul	"Talk"	Larry Benjamin, Kevin Valentine, Phillip W. Palmer	AMC
2019 (71st)	The Handmaid's Tale	"Holly"	Lou Solakofski, Joe Morrow, Sylvain Arseneault	Hulu
2019 (71st)	The Marvelous Mrs. Maisel	"Vote for Kennedy, Vote for Kennedy"	Ron Bochar, Mathew Price, David Bolton, George A. Lara	Prime Video
2019 (71st)	Ozark	"The Badger"	Larry Benjamin, Kevin Valentine, Felipe 'Flip' Borrero, Dave Torres	Netflix

=== 2020s ===
Year	Program	Episode	Nominees	Network
2020 (72nd)
2020 (72nd)	The Marvelous Mrs. Maisel	"A Jewish Girl Walks Into the Apollo..."	Ron Bochar, Mathew Price, David Bolton, George A. Lara	Prime Video
2020 (72nd)	Better Call Saul	"Bagman"	Larry Benjamin, Kevin Valentine, Phillip W. Palmer	AMC
2020 (72nd)	Ozark	"All In"	Larry Benjamin, Kevin Valentine, Felipe 'Flip' Borrero, Phil McGowan	Netflix
2020 (72nd)	Star Trek: Picard	"Et in Arcadia Ego, Part 2"	Peter J. Devlin, Todd M. Grace, CAS, Edward C. Carr III, Michael Perfitt	CBS All Access
2020 (72nd)	Stranger Things	"Chapter Eight: The Battle of Starcourt"	Michael Rayle, Mark Patterson, Will Files, Craig Henighan	Netflix
2020 (72nd)	Westworld	"Parce Domine"	Keith Rogers, Benjamin L. Cook, Geoffrey Patterson	HBO
2021 (73rd)
2021 (73rd)	The Mandalorian	"Chapter 13: The Jedi"	Bonnie Wild, Stephen Urata, Shawn Holden, Chris Fogel	Disney+
2021 (73rd)	The Boys	"What I Know"	Alexandra Fehrman, Rich Weingart, Thomas Hayek	Prime Video
2021 (73rd)	The Crown	"Fairytale"	Lee Walpole, Stuart Hilliker, Martin Jensen, Chris Ashworth	Netflix
2021 (73rd)	The Handmaid's Tale	"Chicago"	Lou Solakofski, Joe Morrow, Sylvain Arseneault	Hulu
2021 (73rd)	Lovecraft Country	"Sundown"	Marc Fishman, Mathew Waters, Amanda Beggs	HBO
2022 (74th)
2022 (74th)	Stranger Things	"Chapter Seven: The Massacre at Hawkins Lab"	Will Files, Mark Paterson, Craig Henighan, Michael P. Clark	Netflix
2022 (74th)	Better Call Saul	"Carrot and Stick"	Larry Benjamin, Kevin Valentine, Phillip W. Palmer	AMC
2022 (74th)	Euphoria	"Stand Still Like the Hummingbird"	Anne Jimkes-Root, Chris David, Austin Roth, Sean O'Malley	HBO
2022 (74th)	The Marvelous Mrs. Maisel	"How Do You Get to Carnegie Hall?"	Ron Bochar, Mathew Price, George A. Lara, Stewart Lerman	Prime Video
2022 (74th)	Ozark	"Sanctified"	Larry Benjamin, Kevin Valentine, Akira Fukasawa, Amy Barber	Netflix
2022 (74th)	Succession	"Too Much Birthday"	Nicholas Renbeck, Andy Kris, Ken Ishii	HBO
2023 (75th)
2023 (75th)	The Last of Us	"When You're Lost in the Darkness"	Marc Fishman, Kevin Roache, Michael Playfair	HBO
2023 (75th)	Better Call Saul	"Saul Gone"	Larry Benjamin, Kevin Valentine, Phillip W. Palmer	AMC
2023 (75th)	The Marvelous Mrs. Maisel	"The Testi-Roastial"	Ron Bochar, Mathew Price, Stewart Lerman, George A. Lara	Prime Video
2023 (75th)	Stranger Things	"Chapter Nine: The Piggyback"	Craig Henighan, William Files, Mark Paterson, Michael P. Clark	Netflix
2023 (75th)	Succession	"Connor's Wedding"	Andy Kris, Nicholas Renbeck, Ken Ishii, Tommy Vicari	HBO
2023 (75th)	The White Lotus	"Arrivederci"	Christian Minkler, Ryan Collins, Vincenzo Urselli, Angelo Bonanni	HBO
2024 (76th)
2024 (76th)	Shōgun	"Broken to the Fist"	Steve Pederson, Greg P. Russell, Michael Williamson, Takashi Akaku, Arno Stephanian	FX
2024 (76th)	The Crown	"Sleep, Dearie Sleep"	Lee Walpole, Martin Jensen, Stuart Hilliker, Chris Ashworth	Netflix
2024 (76th)	Fallout	"The Target"	Keith Rogers, Steve Bucino, Tod A. Maitland	Prime Video
2024 (76th)	Loki	"Glorious Purpose"	Karol Urban, Paul Munro	Disney+
2024 (76th)	3 Body Problem	"Judgment Day"	Marc Fishman, Danielle Dupre, Richard Dyer	Netflix
2025 (77th)
2025 (77th)	Severance	"Cold Harbor"	Bob Chefalas, Jacob Ribicoff, David Schwartz, George Lara	Apple TV+
2025 (77th)	Andor	"Who Are You?"	David Acord, Danny Hambrook, Geoff Foster, Richard Duarte	Disney+
2025 (77th)	The Last of Us	"Through the Valley"	Marc Fishman, Samuel Ejnes, Chris Duesterdiek, Jeffrey Roy, Tami Treadwell	HBO
2025 (77th)	The Pitt	"6:00 P.M."	Todd M. Grace, Ed C. Carr III, Von Varga, Tami Treadwell	HBO Max
2025 (77th)	The White Lotus	"Amor Fati"	Christian Minkler, Ryan Collins, Bea O'Sullivan, Jamison Rabbe, Michael Head	HBO
2026 (78th)
2026 (78th)	Pluribus	"We Is Us"	Larry Benjamin, Tim Hoogenakker, Phillip W. Palmer, Dave Porter, Ron Mellegers, Judah Getz	Apple TV
2026 (78th)	Fallout	"The Strip"	Keith Rogers, Steve Bucino, Ed Novick, Mike Marino	Prime Video
2026 (78th)	The Pitt	"8:00 P.M."	Todd Grace, Edward C. Carr III, Von Varga, Tami Treadwell, Alex Jongbloed	HBO Max
2026 (78th)	Spider-Noir	"Step Into My Office"	Nick Offord, Ryan Collins, Matthew Sanchez, Jordan McClain, Scott Michael Smith, Aaron Hasson	MGM+ / Prime Video
2026 (78th)	Stranger Things	"Chapter Eight: The Rightside Up"	Mark Paterson, William Files, Steve Neal, Michael P. Clark, Hector Carlos Ramirez, Peter Persaud	Netflix

== Programs with multiple awards ==
5 awards

- ER
- Game of Thrones

4 awards

- Star Trek: The Next Generation

3 awards

- Hill Street Blues

2 awards

- House
- The Mandalorian (Note: Total includes The Mandalorian’s win for Outstanding Sound Mixing for a Comedy or Drama Series (Half-Hour) and Animation.)
- 24
- The X-Files

== Mixers with multiple awards ==
5 awards

- Alan Bernard
- Onnalee Blank
- Doug Davey
- Ronan Hill
- Bill Nicholson
- Mathew Waters

4 awards

- Chris Haire
- Michael Jiron
- Richard L. Morrison
- Eddie J. Nelson
- George E. Porter

3 awards

- John Asman
- David Concors
- Richard Dye
- Robert L. Harman
- Ken S. Polk
- Allan L. Stone
- Bill Teague

2 awards

- Juan Cisneros
- James Clark
- Russell C. Fager
- Chris Fogel
- William Gocke
- Lowell Harris
- Shawn Holden
- Franklin Jones Jr.
- Ken Kobett
- George A. Lara
- Bill Marky
- Mike Olman
- Tim Philbin
- Theodore Soderberg
- Von Varga
- Scott Weber
- David John West
- Bonnie Wild

== Programs with multiple nominations ==
10 nominations

- ER

9 nominations

- Hill Street Blues
- NYPD Blue

8 nominations

- 24

7 nominations

- Better Call Saul
- Game of Thrones
- Star Trek: The Next Generation

6 nominations

- CSI: Crime Scene Investigation
- The Sopranos
- Stranger Things

5 nominations

- Lost
- The West Wing

4 nominations

- Boston Legal
- Downton Abbey
- Homeland
- House
- House of Cards
- L.A. Law
- Law & Order
- The Marvelous Mrs. Maisel
- Northern Exposure
- The X-Files

3 nominations

- Battlestar Galactica
- Breaking Bad
- Chicago Hope
- China Beach
- Dexter
- The Handmaid's Tale
- The Mandalorian (Note: Total includes The Mandalorian’s nominations for Outstanding Sound Mixing for a Comedy or Drama Series (Half-Hour) and Animation.)
- Mr. Robot
- Ozark
- St. Elsewhere
- Tour of Duty
- Westworld
- The White Lotus (Note: Total includes The White Lotus’s nomination for Outstanding Sound Mixing for a Limited or Anthology Series or Movie.)
- The Young Indiana Jones Chronicles

2 nominations

- The A-Team
- Boardwalk Empire
- Burn Notice
- Cagney & Lacey
- The Crown
- Deadwood
- Falcon Crest
- Fallout
- Glee
- The Last of Us
- Lois & Clark: The New Adventures of Superman
- Mad Men
- Magnum, P.I.
- Miami Vice
- The Pitt
- The Practice
- Succession
