= Roots (1977 miniseries) =

1977 American TV miniseries

- Promotional poster
- Genre: Historical drama
- Based on: Roots: The Saga of an American Family by Alex Haley
- Written by: Alex Haley
- Screenplay by: Alex Haley; James Lee
- Directed by: Marvin J. Chomsky; John Erman; David Greene; Gilbert Moses
- Starring: John Amos; Ben Vereen; LeVar Burton; Louis Gossett Jr.; Leslie Uggams; Georg Stanford Brown
- Theme music composer: Gerald Fried; Quincy Jones (episode 1)
- Country of origin: United States
- Original language: English
- No. of episodes: 8 (re-edited to 6 for video)

Production
- Executive producer: David L. Wolper
- Producer: Stan Margulies
- Cinematography: Stevan Larner, ASC
- Running time: 45–90 minutes per episode
- Production companies: Wolper Productions; Warner Bros. Television
- Budget: US$6.6 million

Original release
- Network: ABC
- Release: January 23 – January 30, 1977

Related
- Roots: The Next Generations

Roots is a 1977 American television miniseries based on Alex Haley's 1976 novel Roots: The Saga of an American Family, set during and after the era of enslavement in the United States. The series first aired on ABC in January 1977 over eight consecutive nights.

A critical and ratings success over the course of its run, Roots received 37 Primetime Emmy Award nominations and won nine. It also won a Golden Globe and a Peabody Award. It received unprecedented Nielsen ratings for the finale, which holds the record as the third-highest-rated episode for any type of television series, and the third-most-watched overall series finale in American television history.

A sequel, Roots: The Next Generations, first aired in 1979, and a second sequel, Roots: The Gift, a Christmas television film, starring LeVar Burton and Louis Gossett Jr., first aired in 1988. A related film, Alex Haley's Queen, is based on the life of Queen Jackson Haley, who was Alex Haley's paternal grandmother.

In 2016, a remake of the original miniseries, of the same title, was commissioned by the History Channel and screened by the channel on Memorial Day.

== Plot ==
=== Colonial times ===
In The Gambia, West Africa, in 1750, Kunta Kinte is born to Omoro Kinte, a Mandinka warrior, and his wife Binta. He is raised in a Muslim family. When Kunta reaches the age of 15, he and other boys undergo a semi-secretive tribal rite of passage, under the Kintango, which includes wrestling, circumcision, philosophy, war-craft, and hunting skills.

Meanwhile, Captain Thomas Davies meets Vilars, the owner of a cargo ship named Lord Ligonier, and is given command of the vessel in order to trade goods between England, Africa and America. Only at the last minute is he informed that part of his cargo will consist of enslaved African people, to his dismay.

During the early voyage, Mr. Slater, First Deck Officer of the ship, pontificates to Davies about slavery. After learning that Slater is an expert in the field, having undertaken many similar voyages previously, Davies eventually grants him total authority and control over all procedures for ensuring their safe and secure passage to America.

When the ship docks in Africa, Slater introduces Davies to the trader and negotiator, Gardner, who is tasked with the capture or purchase of 170 Africans.

Back in Juffureh, while still in training, Kunta is instructed to catch a bird unharmed. The bird escapes from the safety of the training area, and during the chase, Kunta crosses paths with Gardner's small party of European slave hunters and their captives.

Shortly after his ceremonial return, while fetching wood outside his village to make a drum for his younger brother Lamin, Kunta is captured by Gardner and four black collaborators. He is then sold to a slave trader and placed aboard the slave ship for a three-month journey to Colonial America. The ship eventually leaves Africa with 140 Africans.

During the voyage, Kunta bonds with a Yoruba wrestler who was part of his manhood training, as well as a Mandinka girl named Fanta whom he met shortly before his kidnapping. An insurrection among the enslaved Africans fails to take over the ship, but results in the death of Mr. Slater, several crew members and several Africans, including the wrestler.

The ship eventually arrives in Annapolis, Maryland, in 1767, with 98 Africans still living. The captured Africans are sold at auction as slaves. John Reynolds, a plantation owner from Spotsylvania County, Virginia, near Fredericksburg, buys Kunta and gives him the Christian name Toby. Reynolds assigns an older slave, Fiddler, to teach Kunta English and train him in the ways of servitude. Although Kunta gradually warms up to Fiddler, he wants to preserve his Mandinka (and Islamic) heritage, and he defiantly refuses to eat pork or accept his Christian name.

Kunta makes several unsuccessful attempts to escape, first breaking his ankle chain with a broken tool blade he finds half buried in a field. After this attempt the overseer, Ames, gathers the slaves in the barn, and directs another slave, James, to whip Kunta until he acknowledges his new name "Toby." Fiddler comforts the bloody-backed Kunta and uses his Mandinka name for the first time, assuring him "there will be another day."

=== Late 18th century ===
In 1776, the adult Kunta Kinte, still haunted by his Mandinka roots and desire for freedom, tries again to escape. He makes it to a nearby plantation where his boyhood friend Fanta is a slave, although he discovers after spending the night with her that she has turned away from her African name and heritage in the name of survival. A pair of slave-catchers track him there and hobble him by chopping off almost half his right foot with a hatchet. Exasperated, John Reynolds decides to sell Kunta, which will also settle a debt with his brother Dr. William Reynolds, the local physician. John also transfers several of his other slaves, including Fiddler, to William as well.

Bell, the cook for William's family, successfully treats both Kunta's mangled foot and wounded spirit. A trusted member of the Reynolds household, she arranges for Kunta to become Dr. Reynolds' driver. Eventually Kunta submits to a life of servitude, although he never entirely renounces Africa, his faith in Islam, nor his hope of returning home. He marries Bell, in a ceremony which includes jumping across a broom, although his talk of Africa frustrates her. Bell bears a daughter in 1790, to whom Kunta gives the name Kizzy, which means "stay put" in the Mandinka language (in hopes of ensuring that she will never be sold away). Fiddler continues to mentor Kunta, and dies an old man shortly after Kizzy's birth.

=== Turn of the 19th century ===
An adulterous relationship between Dr. William Reynolds and John Reynolds' wife produces a daughter, Missy Anne, who John believes is his own. Missy Anne and Kizzy become playmates and best friends despite the social confines of Southern plantation culture. Missy Anne secretly teaches Kizzy to read and write, a skill forbidden to slaves. In 1806, Kizzy falls in love with Noah, a spirited slave who attempts to flee North with a "traveling pass" forged by Kizzy from a pass given to her by Missy Anne.

Dr. Reynolds, although amiable and compassionate toward his slaves, regards the pass and escape to be such an egregious breach of trust that he separately sells both Noah and Kizzy, much to the horror of Bell and Kunta. Missy Anne, who had offered Kizzy a place as her companion and maid, watches dispassionately as Kizzy is dragged away. Tom Moore, a planter in Caswell County, North Carolina, with a sexual appetite for young female slaves, becomes Kizzy's new owner, and rapes her the night of her arrival and for many years thereafter. From these experiences, Kizzy becomes pregnant and gives birth to their biracial son George nine months after her arrival.

=== Early 19th century ===
In 1824, the cheerful and confident George, under the tutelage of an older slave named Mingo, learns much about cockfighting. By direction of Moore, George takes over as the chief trainer, the "cock of the walk." George befriends Marcellus, a free black man, and fellow cockfighter, who informs him about the possibility of buying his own freedom. At the same time, he believes Moore to be a close friend.

Meanwhile, the adult Kizzy is wooed by Sam Bennett, a fancy carriage driver whose master is visiting the Moores. Seeking to impress Kizzy, he takes her for a short visit to her former home on Dr. Reynolds's plantation, in the hope that she can see her parents. Kizzy learns that Bell has been sold away and that Kunta died two years earlier. Kizzy sees her father's grave and his wooden marker; using a small stone, she scratches over the name Toby and writes below it "Kunta Kinte," and promises him that his descendants will be free one day.

In 1831, George realizes his master's true feelings when he and his family are threatened at gunpoint by Moore and his wife, as a result of Nat Turner's Rebellion. Although none of Moore's slaves are personally involved in the rebellion, they become victims of the paranoid suspicions of their master, so they start planning to buy their freedom, although Moore tells George he will never allow it. Kizzy finally tells George that Moore is his biological father.

George, having become an expert in cockfighting, earns for himself the moniker "Chicken George." Squire James, Moore's main adversary in the pit, arranges for a British owner, Sir Eric Russell, and twenty of his cocks to visit and to participate in the local fights. Moore eventually bets a huge sum on his best bird, which George has trained, but he loses and cannot pay.

Under the terms of a settlement between Moore and Russell, George goes to England to train cocks for Russell and to train more trainers and is forced to leave behind Kizzy, his wife Tildy, and his sons, Tom and Lewis. Moore promises to set George free on the latter's return and to keep the family together in his absence. However, a now-broke Moore then sells all of his remaining slaves except Kizzy.

Later in life, Kizzy and Missy Anne Reynolds meet by chance one last time. Missy Anne denies that she "recollects" a "darkie by the name of Kizzy." Kizzy then spits into Missy Anne's cup of water without Missy Anne realizing it.

=== The Civil War ===
George returns in 1861, shortly before the start of the Civil War. He proudly announces that Moore, after some reluctance on Moore's part and some persuasion on George's part, has kept his word by granting George his freedom. He learns that Kizzy has died two months before, and that Tildy, Tom and Lewis now belong to Sam Harvey. Tom has become a blacksmith on the Harvey plantation and has a wife, Irene, and two sons.

George is welcomed warmly and learns that his relatives have spoken well of him during his absence. He further learns that according to a law in North Carolina, if he stays 60 days in that state as a freed slave, he will lose his freedom, so he heads northward, seeking the next stage in his career as a cockfighter and awaiting the end of the war, the emancipation of the slaves, and another reunion of his family. Meanwhile, Tom meets harassment at the hands of two brothers, Evan and Jemmy Brent.

While the war continues to its inevitable end, a hungry and destitute young white couple from South Carolina, George and Martha Johnson, arrive and ask for help, and the slave family take them in. George Johnson is given a job as overseer of the plantation but has no experience with slaves and balks at the expectation that he mistreats them. Martha soon gives birth, but the child is stillborn. The couple stays on with Tom and his wife, becoming a part of their community.

Eventually, a month before the surrender by the South, Jemmy deserts the Confederate Army, and he shows up at Tom's blacksmith shop. Tom reluctantly runs an errand for him but, on returning, he finds Jemmy trying to rape Irene, and in the resulting fight Tom drowns him in the quenching tub. Later Evan, now an officer in the Confederate cavalry, arrives at the shop, demands to know about Jemmy, gets no answer, and angrily tells Tom that he has not yet finished with him.

=== Postwar ===
After the war, the former owner of the farm Tom works on, Sam Harvey, is forced to surrender all of his property to Senator Arthur Justin, a local politician intent on acquiring as much land as possible. Under the terms of the surrender, his former slaves are allowed to stay on as sharecroppers, with eventual rights to own a part of the land. However, because no written deed has been filed, the senator deems the agreement void and imposes heavy debts on the black farmers as a legal pretext to keep them from leaving the county. He later gives oversight of the farm to Evan Brent, who reinstates George Johnson as overseer, believing whites should not farm alongside blacks.

One night, several local white men, led by Evan and wearing white hoods (made from fabric sacks from Evan's store) begin to harass and terrorize Tom, his family, and other members of his community. Tom emerges as the leader among his group, while tensions arise between the white Johnsons and Tom's brother Lewis. As the local blacksmith, Tom devises a horseshoeing method to identify the horses involved in the raids by the hooded men. But when Tom reports his suspicions and his evidence to the sheriff, who sympathizes with Evan and knows every member of the white mob, the sheriff tips off Evan.

Evan's mob leads another raid against Tom, during which Tom is whipped. George Johnson intervenes and reluctantly volunteers to whip Tom, in order to save his friend's life. Lewis emotionally reconciles with the Johnsons as the family treats Tom's injuries, unsure of their future. Chicken George then unexpectedly returns, raising the spirits of his relatives and friends, and begins to plot their next step. He reports that he has bought some land in Tennessee.

Using some cunning and deception of their own, the black farmers make preparations for their move away. The group eventually lures Evan and his gang to the farm and overpowers them, jubilantly departing for Tennessee. Chicken George and his group arrive on his land in Henning, Lauderdale County, Tennessee, to start their new life. Once there, George and Tom retell part of the story of Kunta Kinte in Africa to his (George's) grandchildren in Tennessee.

== Cast ==
Number in parentheses indicates how many episodes in which the actor/character appears.

Main cast

- John Amos – Older Kunta Kinte (3)
- Maya Angelou – Nyo Boto (1)
- Ed Asner – Capt. Davies (2)
- Lloyd Bridges – Evan Brent (2)
- Georg Stanford Brown – Tom Harvey (2)
- LeVar Burton – Young Kunta Kinte (2)
- Macdonald Carey – Squire James (1)
- Olivia Cole – Matilda (3)
- Chuck Connors – Tom Moore (2)
- Scatman Crothers – Mingo (1)
- Ji-Tu Cumbuka – Wrestler (2)
- Brad Davis – Ol' George Johnson (2)
- Sandy Duncan – Missy Anne Reynolds (2)
- Lynda Day George – Mrs. Reynolds (3)
- Louis Gossett Jr. – Fiddler (3)
- Lorne Greene – John Reynolds (2)
- Moses Gunn – Kintango (1)
- George Hamilton – Stephen Bennett (1)
- Hilly Hicks – Lewis (2)
- Burl Ives – Sen. Arthur Justin (1)
- Lawrence Hilton-Jacobs – Noah (1)
- Carolyn Jones – Mrs. Moore (2)
- Doug McClure – Jemmy Brent (1)
- Ian McShane – Sir Eric Russell (1)
- Lynne Moody – Irene Harvey (2)
- Vic Morrow – Ames (2)
- Thalmus Rasulala – Omoro (1)
- Robert Reed – Dr. William Reynolds (4)
- Harry Rhodes – Brima Cesay (1)
- Richard Roundtree – Sam Bennett (1)
- John Schuck – Ordell (1)
- Paul Shenar – John Carrington (1)
- O. J. Simpson – Kadi Touray (1)
- Madge Sinclair – Bell Reynolds (3)
- Cicely Tyson – Binta (1)
- Leslie Uggams – Kizzy Reynolds (2)
- Ben Vereen – Chicken George Moore (3)
- Ralph Waite – Third mate Slater (2)
- William Watson – Gardner (1)
- Ren Woods – Fanta (2)

Also appearing

- Lane Binkley – Martha Johnson (2)
- Tanya Boyd – Genelva (2)
- Todd Bridges – Bud (1)
- Grand L. Bush – Captured runaway slave (1)
- Gary Collins – Grill (1)
- Fred Covington - auctioneer (1)
- Charles Cyphers – Drake (1)
- Thayer David – Harlan (2)
- Richard Farnsworth – Trumbull (1)
- Tracey Gold – Young Missy Reynolds (1)
- Brion James – Slaver (1)
- Rachel Longaker - Caroline (1)
- Macon McCalman – Poston (1)
- Richard McKenzie – Sam Harvey (2)
- John Quade – Sheriff Biggs (1)
- Roxie Roker – Malizy (1)
- Lillian Randolph – Sister Sara (1)
- Raymond St. Jacques – Drummer (1)
- Austin Stoker – Virgil (2)
- Ernest Lee Thomas – Kailuba (1)
- Beverly Todd – Older Fanta (1)
- Zack Fisher – Abraham Lincoln

== Production ==
The miniseries was directed by Marvin J. Chomsky, John Erman, David Greene, and Gilbert Moses. It was produced by Stan Margulies. David L. Wolper was executive producer. The score was composed by Gerald Fried, and Quincy Jones for only the first episode. Many familiar white TV actors, such as Ed Asner (from The Mary Tyler Moore Show), Chuck Connors (The Rifleman), Lorne Greene (Bonanza and later Battlestar Galactica), Robert Reed (The Brady Bunch), and Ralph Waite (The Waltons) were cast against type as slave holders and traders. ABC television executives "got cold feet" after seeing the brutality depicted in the series and attempted to cut the network's predicted losses by airing the series over eight consecutive nights in January in one fell swoop. The Museum of Broadcast Communications recounts the apprehensions that Roots would flop, and how this made ABC prepare the format:

Familiar television actors like Lorne Greene were chosen for the white, secondary roles, to reassure audiences. The white actors were featured disproportionately in network previews. For the first episode, the writers created a conscience-stricken slave captain (Ed Asner), a figure who did not appear in Haley's novel but was intended to make white audiences feel better about their historical role in the slave trade. Even the show's consecutive-night format allegedly resulted from network apprehensions. ABC programming chief Fred Silverman hoped that the unusual schedule would cut his network's imminent losses—and get Roots off the air before sweeps week.

— Encyclopedia of Television, Museum of Broadcast Communications

== Musical score and soundtrack ==
Roots: The Saga of an American Family

Soundtrack album by Quincy Jones
- Released: February 1977
- Recorded: 1977
- Genre: Film score
- Length: 27:41
- Labels: A&M; SP-4626
- Producer: Quincy Jones

Quincy Jones chronology
I Heard That!! (1976)	Roots: The Saga of an American Family (1977)	Sounds...and Stuff Like That!! (1978)

The majority of the miniseries' score, including the main "Mural" theme heard during the opening credits, was by veteran composer Gerald Fried. Quincy Jones contributed music for the first episode, however, and he and Fried each earned an Emmy for their work on that installment.

An album titled Roots: The Saga of an American Family, featuring music from and inspired by the program and re-arranged and conducted by Jones, became a hit for A&M in 1977. The original soundtrack was released the following year.

Professional ratings
Review scores
Source	Rating
AllMusic	2.5/5 stars

In explaining the impetus for Jones' version, AllMusic critic Richard S. Ginell noted that the composer "has been threatening to write a long tone poem sketching the history of black music for decades now, and he has yet to do it. This project, rushed out in the wake of the 1977 TV miniseries Roots, is about as close as he has come. A brief (28 minutes) immaculately produced and segued suite, Roots quickly traces a timeline from Africa to the Civil War, incorporating ancient and modern African influences (with Letta Mbulu as the featured vocalist), a sea shanty, field hollers and fiddle tunes, snippets of dialogue from Roots actor Lou Gossett, and some Hollywood-style movie cues. ... Though some prominent jazzers turn up in the orchestra, there is not a trace of jazz to be heard. This is a timely souvenir of a cultural phenomenon, but merely a curiosity for jazz fans".

=== Track listing ===
All compositions by Quincy Jones except where noted.

1. "Motherland" − 0:29
2. "Roots Mural Theme" (Gerald Fried) − 2:12
3. "Main Title: Mama Aifambeni" (Quincy Jones, Caiphus Semenya) − 0:59
4. "Behold the Only Thing Greater Than Yourself (Birth)" (Jones, Semenya) − 1:30
5. "Oluwa (Many Rains Ago)" (Jones, Semenya) − 2:28
6. "Boyhood to Manhood" (Jones, Zak Diouf, Bill Summers) − 0:55
7. "The Toubob Is Here! (The Capture)" − 1:01
8. "Middle Passage (Slaveship Crossing)" − 1:15
9. "You in Americuh Now, African" − 0:33
10. "Roots Mural Theme Intro (Slave Auction)" (Fried) − 0:16
11. "Ole Fiddler" (Lou Gossett Jr.) − 1:12
12. "Jumpin' de Broom (Marriage Ceremony)" (Jones, Bobby Bruce) − 0:42
13. "What Can I Do? (Hush, Hush, Somebody's Calling My Name)" (Jones, James Cleveland) − 2:16
14. "Roots Mural Theme Bridge (Plantation Life)" (Fried) − 1:00
15. "Oh Lord, Come By Here" (Jones, Cleveland) − 3:36
16. "Ole Fiddler/Free at Last? (The Civil War)" (Gosset/Jones) − 2:24
17. "Many Rains Ago (Oluwa) [African Theme/English Version]" (Jones, Semenya) − 4:53

=== Personnel ===
- Conceived, produced, arranged and conducted by Quincy Jones
- Bobby Bryant, Buddy Childers, John Audino − trumpet
- Bill Watrous, Dick Nash, Maurice Spear − trombone
- Alan Robinson, David Duke, James Decker − French horn
- Tommy Johnson − tuba
- Ernie Watts, Jerome Richardson, Ted Nash, Terry Harrington, Bill Green − woodwinds
- Dave Grusin, Ian Underwood, Mike Boddicker, Pete Jolly, Richard Tee − keyboards
- David T. Walker, Lee Ritenour − guitar
- Catherine Gotthoffer, Dorothy Remsen − harp
- Al Hendrickson − banjo
- Chuck Rainey, Ed Reddick − electric bass
- Arni Egillson, Milt Kestenbaum − bass
- Bill Summers, Bobbye Hall, Caiphus Semenya, Emil Richards, King Errison, Milt Holland, Paul Bryant, Shelly Manne, Tommy Vig, Victor Feldman, Zak Diouf − percussion
- Bobby Bruce − fiddle (track 12)
- Bobby Bruce, Erno Neufeld, Gerald Vinci, Harry Bluestone, Irv Katz, Janice Gower, John Santulis, Joseph Livoti, Joe Stepansky, Ralph Shaeffer, Bob Sushell, Sheldon Sanov, Bill Nuttycomb − violin
- Alex Nieman, Marilyn Baker, Bob Ostrowsky, Rollis Dale − viola
- Jeff Solow, Jesse Erlich, Paul Bergstrom, Ronnie Cooper − cello
- The Wattsline Choir conducted by Reverend James Cleveland – vocals (tracks 3, 5, 8, 13, 15 & 17)
  - Charles May, David Pridgen, Mortonette Jenkins, Rodney Armstrong, Sherwood Sledge
- Letta Mbulu − vocals (tracks 3–5 & 17)
- Lou Gossett − vocals, dialogue (tracks 9, 11, & 16)
- Stan Haze − dialogue (track 10)
- Zak Diouf − vocals (track 6)
- Alex Hassilev − vocals (track 8)
- Alexandra Brown, Caiphus Semenya, Deborah Tibbs, Jim Gilstrap, John Lehman, Linda Evans, Paulette McWilliams, Reverend James Cleveland, Stephanie Spruill – vocals
- Bill Summers, Caiphus Semenya, Dave Grusin, Herb Spencer, John Mandel, Reverend James Cleveland, Dick Hazard, Tommy Bahler – arrangers
- Tommy Bahler − choir arranger and conductor (tracks 5 & 17)

=== Charts and certifications ===
Chart (1977)	Peak position
Australia (Kent Music Report)	68

Region	Certification	Certified units/sales
United States (RIAA)	Gold	500,000^{^}
^{^} Shipments figures based on certification alone.

== Reception ==
The series received positive reviews. Review aggregator website, Rotten Tomatoes later rated it 76% "fresh" based on 32 reviews, with the critic's consensus stating "Roots may shave off the nuances of Alex Haley's landmark book for the sake of slicker storytelling, but excellent performances and the intrinsic power of this generational tale make for revelatory television." Variety reviewed it positively, summarizing, "The production and performances are strong, with newcomer LeVar Burton effective as the African youngster trapped into slavery. Edward Asner, as he did in Rich Man, Poor Man a year ago, dominates the screen in his opening scenes." In 2023, Variety ranked Roots as the No. 10 greatest TV show of all time.

== Broadcast history ==
=== Episode lists ===
Roots originally aired on ABC for eight consecutive nights from January 23 to 30, 1977. In the United Kingdom, BBC One aired the series in six parts, starting with parts 1 to 3 over the weekend of April 8 to 11, 1977. The concluding three parts were broadcast on Sunday nights, from April 15 to May 1. The six-part version screened by the BBC was the version released on home video until the 2016 Blu-ray release.

Original run #	Re-edited version #	Approximate time period	Featured Kinte descendant(s)			
Original run #	Re-edited version #	Approximate time period	Kunta Kinte	Kizzy	Chicken George	Tom Harvey
Part I (96m)		1750–1767	Yes			
Part II (96m)		1767–1768	Yes			
Part III (50m)	Part III (90m)	1776	Yes			
Part IV (50m)	Part III (90m)	1780–1790	Yes	Yes		
Part V (50m)	Part IV (90m)	1806	Yes	Yes		
Part VI (99m)	Part IV (90m)	1824		Yes	Yes	
Part VI (99m)	Part V (90m)	1841–1847		Yes	Yes	Yes
Part VII (50m)	Part V (90m)	1861–1865			Yes	Yes
Part VIII (95m)	Part VI (90m)	1865–1870			Yes	Yes

No.	Title	Directed by	Written by	Original runtime	Original release date
1	"Part I"	David Greene	William Blinn and Ernest Kinoy	2 h	January 23, 1977
2	"Part II"	David Greene (First Hour); John Erman (Second Hour)	Ernest Kinoy and William Blinn	2 h	January 24, 1977
3	"Part III"	Marvin J. Chomsky	James Lee and William Blinn	1 h	January 25, 1977
4	"Part IV"	Marvin J. Chomsky	James Lee and William Blinn	1 h	January 26, 1977
5	"Part V"	Marvin J. Chomsky	James Lee	1 h	January 27, 1977
6	"Part VI"	Marvin J. Chomsky (First Hour); Gilbert Moses (Second Hour)	M. Charles Cohen (First Hour); James Lee and William Blinn (Second Hour)	2 h	January 28, 1977
7	"Part VII"	Gilbert Moses	M. Charles Cohen	1 h	January 29, 1977
8	"Part VIII"	Marvin J. Chomsky	M. Charles Cohen	2 h	January 30, 1977

=== U.S. television ratings ===
The miniseries was watched by an estimated 130 million and 140 million viewers total (more than half of the U.S. 1977 population of 221 million—the largest viewership ever attracted by any type of television series in US history as tallied by Nielsen Media Research) and averaged a 44.9 rating and 66% to 80% viewer share of the audience. The final episode was watched by 100 million viewers and an average of 80 million viewers watched each of the last seven episodes. Eighty-five percent of all television homes saw all or part of the miniseries. All episodes rank within the top-100-rated TV shows of all time.

Episode		Nielsen Ratings				Date
Episode		All-time ranking	Households (millions)	Rating	Share	Date
1	Roots Part I	#82	28.84	40.5	61%	January 23, 1977
2	Roots Part II	#32	31.40	44.1	62%	January 24, 1977
3	Roots Part III	#27	31.90	44.8	68%	January 25, 1977
4	Roots Part IV	#35	31.19	43.8	66%	January 26, 1977
5	Roots Part V	#21	32.54	45.7	71%	January 27, 1977
6	Roots Part VI	#18	32.68	45.9	66%	January 28, 1977
7	Roots Part VII	#50	30.12	42.3	65%	January 29, 1977
8	Roots Part VIII	#3	36.38	51.1	71%	January 30, 1977

On February 16–18, 2013, in honor of Black History Month and the 36th anniversary of Roots, cable network BET aired both Roots and its sequel miniseries, Roots: The Next Generations. Celebrating the 35th anniversary of Roots, BET premiered the miniseries on a three-day-weekend showing in December 2012, which resulted in its being seen by a total of 10.8 million viewers, according to Nielsen ratings, and became the number-one Roots telecast in cable-television history. As for the BET network, its 35th-anniversary airing of Roots became its best "non-tentpole" weekend in the network's history. On Sunday, October 18, 2015, TV One rebroadcast Roots in high definition.

== Home media ==
Warner Home Video, which released a three-disc 25th-anniversary DVD edition of the series in 2002, released a four-disc (three double-sided, one single-sided) 30th-anniversary set on May 22, 2007. Bonus features include a new audio commentary by LeVar Burton, Cicely Tyson and Ed Asner, among other key cast members, "Remembering Roots" behind-the-scenes documentary, "Crossing Over: How Roots Captivated an Entire Nation" featurette, new interviews with key cast members and the DVD-ROM "Roots Family Tree" feature.

In 2016, Warner released a 40th anniversary Blu-ray, restoring the eight-episode format, completely remastered from the original elements.

The miniseries has also been released in the digital format for streaming, although in the edited six-episode format.

Roots is not available on Warner Bros. Discovery's streaming service, Max.

== Awards and nominations ==
=== Accolades ===
Year	Award	Category	Nominee(s)	Result	Ref.
1977	Golden Globe Awards	Best Series – Drama	Roots	Won	
1977	Golden Globe Awards	Best Actress – Drama Series	Leslie Uggams	Nominated	
1977	Primetime Emmy Awards	Outstanding Limited Series	Roots	Won	
1977	Primetime Emmy Awards	Outstanding Directing for a Drama Series	David Greene (for "Part I")	Won	
1977	Primetime Emmy Awards	Outstanding Directing for a Drama Series	Marvin J. Chomsky (for "Part III")	Nominated	
1977	Primetime Emmy Awards	Outstanding Directing for a Drama Series	John Erman (for "Part II")	Nominated	
1977	Primetime Emmy Awards	Outstanding Directing for a Drama Series	Gilbert Moses (for "Part VI")	Nominated	
1977	Primetime Emmy Awards	Outstanding Writing for a Drama Series	Ernest Kinoy and William Blinn (for "Part II")	Won	
1977	Primetime Emmy Awards	Outstanding Writing for a Drama Series	M. Charles Cohen (for "Part VIII")	Nominated	
1977	Primetime Emmy Awards	Outstanding Writing for a Drama Series	James Lee (for "Part V")	Nominated	
1977	Primetime Emmy Awards	Outstanding Lead Actor for a Single Appearance in a Drama or Comedy Series	Louis Gossett Jr. (for "Part IV")	Won	
1977	Primetime Emmy Awards	Outstanding Lead Actor for a Single Appearance in a Drama or Comedy Series	John Amos (for "Part V")	Nominated	
1977	Primetime Emmy Awards	Outstanding Lead Actor for a Single Appearance in a Drama or Comedy Series	LeVar Burton (for "Part I")	Nominated	
1977	Primetime Emmy Awards	Outstanding Lead Actor for a Single Appearance in a Drama or Comedy Series	Ben Vereen (for "Part VI")	Nominated	
1977	Primetime Emmy Awards	Outstanding Lead Actress for a Single Appearance in a Drama or Comedy Series	Madge Sinclair (for "Part IV")	Nominated	
1977	Primetime Emmy Awards	Outstanding Lead Actress for a Single Appearance in a Drama or Comedy Series	Leslie Uggams (for "Part VI")	Nominated	
1977	Primetime Emmy Awards	Outstanding Single Performance by a Supporting Actor in a Comedy or Drama Series	Ed Asner (for "Part I")	Won	
1977	Primetime Emmy Awards	Outstanding Single Performance by a Supporting Actor in a Comedy or Drama Series	Moses Gunn (for "Part I")	Nominated	
1977	Primetime Emmy Awards	Outstanding Single Performance by a Supporting Actor in a Comedy or Drama Series	Robert Reed (for "Part V")	Nominated	
1977	Primetime Emmy Awards	Outstanding Single Performance by a Supporting Actor in a Comedy or Drama Series	Ralph Waite (for "Part I")	Nominated	
1977	Primetime Emmy Awards	Outstanding Single Performance by a Supporting Actress in a Comedy or Drama Series	Olivia Cole (for "Part VIII")	Won	
1977	Primetime Emmy Awards	Outstanding Single Performance by a Supporting Actress in a Comedy or Drama Series	Sandy Duncan (for "Part V")	Nominated	
1977	Primetime Emmy Awards	Outstanding Single Performance by a Supporting Actress in a Comedy or Drama Series	Cicely Tyson (for "Part I")	Nominated	
1977	Primetime Emmy Awards	Outstanding Art Direction or Scenic Design for a Drama Series	Solomon Brewer and Joseph R. Jennings	Nominated	
1977	Primetime Emmy Awards	Outstanding Art Direction or Scenic Design for a Drama Series	Charles C. Bennett and Jan Scott	Nominated	
1977	Primetime Emmy Awards	Outstanding Cinematography for a Series	Stevan Larner (for "Part II")	Nominated	
1977	Primetime Emmy Awards	Outstanding Cinematography for a Series	Joseph M. Wilcots (for "Part VII")	Nominated	
1977	Primetime Emmy Awards	Outstanding Achievement in Costume Design for a Drama or Comedy Series	Jack Martell (for "Part I")	Nominated	
1977	Primetime Emmy Awards	Outstanding Achievement in Music Composition for a Series (Dramatic Underscore)	Quincy Jones and Gerald Fried (for "Part I")	Won	
1977	Primetime Emmy Awards	Outstanding Achievement in Music Composition for a Series (Dramatic Underscore)	Gerald Fried (for "Part VIII")	Nominated	
1977	Primetime Emmy Awards	Outstanding Film Editing for a Drama Series	Neil Travis (for "Part I")	Won	
1977	Primetime Emmy Awards	Outstanding Film Editing for a Drama Series	James T. Heckert (for "Part II")	Nominated	
1977	Primetime Emmy Awards	Outstanding Film Editing for a Drama Series	Peter Kirby (for "Part III")	Nominated	
1977	Primetime Emmy Awards	Outstanding Film Editing for a Drama Series	Neil Travis and James T. Heckert (for "Part VIII")	Nominated	
1977	Primetime Emmy Awards	Outstanding Achievement in Film Sound Editing	Larry Carow, George Fredrick, Colin Mouat, Larry Neiman, Dave Pettijohn, Paul Bruce Richardson, Don Warner (for "Part II")	Won	
1977	Primetime Emmy Awards	Outstanding Achievement in Film Sound Mixing	Willie D. Burton, Robert Litt, Leonard Peterson, Bill Varney (for "Part I")	Nominated	
1977	Primetime Emmy Awards	Outstanding Achievement in Film Sound Mixing	Willie D. Burton, George E. Porter, Eddie J. Nelson, Robert L. Harman (for "Part IV")	Nominated	
1977	Primetime Emmy Awards	Outstanding Achievement in Film Sound Mixing	Hoppy Mehterian, George E. Porter, Eddie J. Nelson, Arnold Braun (for "Part VII")	Nominated	
1977	Primetime Emmy Awards	Outstanding Achievement in Film Sound Mixing	George E. Porter, Eddie J. Nelson, Robert L. Harman, Arnold Braun (for "Part VIII")	Nominated	

== Remake ==
The History channel produced a remake of the miniseries after acquiring rights from David L. Wolper's son, Mark Wolper, and Haley's estate. The new eight-hour miniseries, with Mark Wolper as executive producer, drew on Haley's novel and the original miniseries albeit from a contemporary perspective. It was additionally simulcast on Lifetime and A&E. Will Packer, Marc Toberoff, Lawrence Konner and Mark Rosenthal also serve as executive producers, with LeVar Burton and Korin Huggins as co-executive producers.

The four-night event series premiered on Memorial Day, May 30, 2016. The ensemble cast includes Forest Whitaker as Fiddler, Anna Paquin as Nancy Holt, Jonathan Rhys Meyers as Tom Lea, Anika Noni Rose as Kizzy, Tip "T.I." Harris as Cyrus, Emayatzy Corinealdi as Bell, Matthew Goode as Dr. William Waller, Mekhi Phifer as Jerusalem, James Purefoy as John Waller, introduces Regé-Jean Page as Chicken George and Malachi Kirby as Kunta Kinte, with Laurence Fishburne as Alex Haley.

== See also ==
- For events that occur in 1775, see Roots: The Gift
- For events that occur from the late 19th century into the 20th century, see Roots: The Next Generations
- List of films featuring slavery
- Behold, 1990 statue
