= Primetime Emmy Award for Outstanding Sound Mixing for a Nonfiction Program =

Television award category

- Awarded for: Outstanding Sound Mixing for a Nonfiction Program
- Country: United States
- Presented by: Academy of Television Arts & Sciences
- Currently held by: Billy Joel: And So It Goes (2026)
- Website: emmys.com

The Primetime Emmy Award for Outstanding Sound Mixing for a Nonfiction Program is awarded to one television documentary or nonfiction series each year. From 2019 until 2022, nominations were divided between documentary/nonfiction programs and reality programs, proportional to the number of submissions of each. They were split in 2023 with Outstanding Sound Mixing for a Reality Program becoming its own category.

== Winners and nominations ==
=== 1980s ===
Year	Program	Episode	Nominees	Network
1980	Outstanding Individual Achievement - Informational Programming (Note: As a juried award, nominees had to garner 50% approval to win the award.)			
1980	Dive to the Edge of Creation (National Geographic Special)		David Clark, Joel Fein, Robert L. Harman, George E. Porter	PBS
1981	Outstanding Individual Achievement - Informational Programming (Note: As a juried award, nominees had to garner 50% approval to win the award.)			
1981	Cosmos	"Blues for a Red Planet"	Kent Gibson, Gerald Zelinger	PBS
1981	Gorilla (National Geographic Special)		Gary Bourgeois, Dave Dockendorf, John L. Mack, Dick Rector	PBS
1981	Etosha: Place of Dry Water (National Geographic Special)		Dave Dockendorf, David Hughes, Hoppy Mehterian, George E. Porter	PBS
1981	Living Treasures of Japan (National Geographic Special)		Gary Bourgeois, Kenneth Love, Hoppy Mehterian, Howard Wollman	PBS
1981	National Parks: Playground or Paradise (National Geographic Special)		Gary Bourgeois, George E. Porter, Terry Porter, Chuck White	PBS
1982	Outstanding Individual Achievement - Informational Programming (Note: As a juried award, nominees had to garner 50% approval to win the award. The nominees did not meet the benchmark and no award was given.)			
1982	Great Movie Stunts: Raiders of the Lost Ark		Gary Bourgeois, Hoppy Mehterian, David Wisnievitz, Howard Wollman	CBS

=== 1990s ===
Year	Program	Episode	Nominees	Network
1993	Outstanding Individual Achievement - Informational Programming (Note: As a juried award, nominees had to garner 50% approval to win the award. The nominees did not meet the benchmark and no award was given.)			
1993	Mysteries Underground (National Geographic)		Michael Becker, Ken King, Mark Linden, Paul Schremp	PBS
1994	Outstanding Individual Achievement - Informational Programming (Note: As a juried award, nominees had to garner 50% approval to win the award.)			
1994	Reflections on Elephants		Beverly Joubert	PBS
1995	Outstanding Individual Achievement - Informational Programming (Note: As a juried award, nominees had to garner 50% approval to win the award. The nominees did not meet the benchmark and no award was given.)			
1995	One Survivor Remembers		Piotr Domaradzki, Richard Fiocca, Ken Hahn, David Jaunai, Robert Silverthorne, Merce Williams	HBO
1996	Outstanding Individual Achievement - Informational Programming (Note: As a juried award, nominees had to garner 50% approval to win the award. The nominees did not meet the benchmark and no award was given.)			
1996	The Celluloid Closet		Gauthem Choudherry, Bob Gravenor, Lora Hirschberg, Lauretta Molitor, Peggy Names, J.T. Takagi	HBO
1999	Avalanche: The White Death (National Geographic Specials)		Dennis Towns, Scot Charles, Al Decker, Tara A. Paul	NBC
1999	Biography	"The Rat Pack"	Chris Drozdowski	A&E

=== 2000s ===
Year	Program	Episode	Nominees	Network
2000 (Note: As a juried award, nominees had to garner 50% approval to win the award. The nominees did not meet the benchmark and no award was given.)	Raising the Mammoth		Paul Schremp, Troy Tatzko	Discovery
2000	Walking with Dinosaurs		Bob Jackson	Discovery
2001	Survivor	"Episode 1"	Terrance Dwyer	CBS
2001	The Beatles Revolution		Ken Hahn, David Jaunai, Ashley Howe	ABC
2001	Behind the Music	"John Lennon: The Last Years"	Earl Martin, Richard Gray	VH1
2001	Jazz	"Dedicated to Chaos"	Dominick Tavella	PBS
2001	Living Dolls: The Making of a Child Beauty Queen		John McCormick, Mitch Dorf	HBO
2002	9/11		Grant Maxwell, Ken Hahn, Danny Caccavo	CBS
2002	The Blue Planet	"The Deep"	Graham Wild	Discovery
2002	In Memoriam: New York City		Larry Rock, Ken Hahn	HBO
2002	Recording 'The Producers': A Musical Romp with Mel Brooks (Great Performances)		Peter Miller, Roger Phenix, Lee Dichter	PBS
2002	The True Story of Black Hawk Down		Marcus Pardo	History
2003	American Masters	"Joni Mitchell: Woman of Heart and Mind"	Peter Waggoner	PBS
2003	American Idol	"Finale"	Klaus Landsberg, Brian Riordan	Fox
2003	The Day the Towers Fell		Sammy Jackson, Scott Delaney	History
2003	Expedition: Bismarck		Ben Zarai, Ken Skoglund, Eric Reuveni, Aaron F. Quirk, Buck Robinson	Discovery
2003	Journeys with George		Coll Anderson	HBO
2004	Dinosaur Planet	"Pod's Travels" / "Alpha's Egg"	Mike Olman, Ken Kobett	Discovery
2004	The Amazing Race	"I Could Never Have Been Prepared for What I'm Looking at Right Now"	Troy Smith	CBS
2004	American Masters	"Judy Garland: By Myself"	Ed Campbell	PBS
2004	Failure Is Not an Option		Greg McCleary	History
2004	Survivor	"They're Back"	Terrance Dwyer, Jeremy Ireland, Heron Alencar, Roger Arguello, Rick Armstrong, Jerry Masanky Chabane, Christina Chin, Dan Foster, Richard Hill, Matthias Hoffman, Tony Jensen, Chris Kelly, Drew Levinson, Terry Meehan, Robert MacKay, Mike Ormsby, Rob Rosales, Bram Tulloch, Jim Ursulak	CBS
2005	Broadway: The American Musical	"Oh, What a Beautiful Mornin'"	Ed Campbell	PBS
2005	The Amazing Race	"We're Moving Up the Food Chain"	Troy Smith, Jim Ursulak, Heron Alencar, Gary Azzinaro, Tyler Bender, Stephen Crawley, Dean Gaveau, Brian Johnson, Peter Jones, William Minchin, Gustavo Gama Rodrigues, Kris Bagley, Barry Weissman	CBS
2005	American Idol	"Episode 401/402"	Brian Riordan	Fox
2005	America's Deadliest Season: Alaskan Crab Fishing	"The Clock's Ticking"	Bob Bronow	Discovery
2005	Survivor	"Love Is in the Air, Rats Are Everywhere"	Terrance Dwyer, Jeremy Ireland, Christina Chin, Tony Jensen, Robert MacKay, Terry Meehan, Chris Kelly, Molefi J. Chabane, Dan Foster, Mike Ormsby, Steve Guercio, Scott Hanlon, Michael St. Hilaire, Colette Stewart, Jonathan Andrews, Drew Levinson	CBS
2006	American Masters	"No Direction Home: Bob Dylan"	Tom Fleischman	PBS
2006	The Amazing Race	"Here Comes the Bedouin!"	Troy Smith, Jim Ursulak, Jerry Masanky Chabane, Peter Jones	CBS
2006	Baghdad ER		Jon Alpert, Matthew O'Neill, Paul Hsu	HBO
2006	Deadliest Catch	"The Clock's Ticking"	Bob Bronow	Discovery
2006	Survivor	"Big Trek, Big Trouble, Big Surprise"	Terrance Dwyer, Jeremy Ireland, Matthias Hoffman, Tony Jensen	CBS
2007	American Masters	"Atlantic Records: The House That Ahmet Built"	Ed Campbell	PBS
2007	The Amazing Race	"I Know Phil, Little Ol' Gorgeous Thing"	Jim Ursulak, Jerry Masanky Chabane, Dean Gaveau, Barry Weissman, Peter Wong, Troy Smith	CBS
2007	Deadliest Catch	"The Unforgiving Sea"	Bob Bronow	Discovery
2007	Planet Earth	"Pole to Pole"	Graham Wild	Discovery
2007	When the Levees Broke: A Requiem in Four Acts		Ken Ishii, Stuart Deutsch, Charles R. Hunt, Bo Walker, Bob Chefalas, Douglas Murray	HBO
2008	American Masters	"Tony Bennett: The Music Never Ends"	Jason King	PBS
2008	The Amazing Race	"Honestly, They Have Witch Powers or Something"	Jim Ursulak, Jerry Masanky Chabane, Dean Gaveau, Troy Smith	CBS
2008	Deadliest Catch	"No Mercy"	Bob Bronow	Discovery
2008	The War	"When Things Get Tough"	Dominick Tavella	PBS
2009	102 Minutes That Changed America		Damon Trotta	History
2009	The Amazing Race	"Don't Let a Cheese Hit Me"	Jim Ursulak, Jerry Masanky Chabane, Dean Gaveau, Troy Smith	CBS
2009	American Idol	"Episode 801/802"	Brian Riordan, Adrian Ordonez	Fox
2009	Deadliest Catch	"Stay Focused or Die"	Bob Bronow	Discovery
2009	Survivor	"The Poison Apple Needs to Go"	Robert Mackay, Terry Meehan, Christopher Kelly, Terrance Dwyer	CBS

=== 2010s ===
Year	Program	Episode	Nominees	Network
2010	Deadliest Catch	"No Second Chances"	Bob Bronow	Discovery
2010	The Amazing Race	"I Think We're Fighting the Germans, Right?"	Jim Ursulak, Dean Gaveau, Jerry Masanky Chabane, Troy Smith	CBS
2010	Life	"Challenges of Life"	Graham Wild, John Rigatuso	Discovery
2010	The National Parks: America's Best Idea	"The Scripture of Nature"	Dominick Tavella	PBS
2010	Spectacle: Elvis Costello with...	"Bruce Springsteen"	Neil Cedar	Sundance Channel
2011	Deadliest Catch	"Redemption Day"	Bob Bronow	Discovery
2011	The Amazing Race	"You Don't Get Paid Unless You Win"	Jim Ursulak, Dean Gaveau, Jerry Masanky Chabane, Troy Smith	CBS
2011	American Idol	"Auditions No. 2: New Orleans"	Brian Riordan, Kamal Humphrey, Phil Valdivia, Chris Tront	Fox
2011	American Masters	"LENNONYC"	Ed Campbell	PBS
2011	Gettysburg		Dieter Keck	History
2012	Paul Simon's Graceland Journey: Under African Skies		Tom Paul	A&E
2012	The Amazing Race	"Let Them Drink Their Haterade"	Jim Ursulak, Dean Gaveau, Jerry Masanky Chabane, Troy Smith	CBS
2012	Deadliest Catch	"I Don't Wanna Die"	Bob Bronow	Discovery
2012	Frozen Planet	"Ends of the Earth"	Graham Wild, Archie Moore	Discovery
2012	George Harrison: Living in the Material World		Tom Fleischman and Bob Chefalas	HBO
2013	History of the Eagles		Tom Fleischman, Bret Johnson, Richard F.W. Davis, Elliot Scheiner, Mike Harlow	Showtime
2013	The Amazing Race	"Be Safe and Don't Hit a Cow"	Jim Ursulak, Dean Gaveau, Jerry Masanky Chabane, Troy Smith	CBS
2013	Anthony Bourdain: Parts Unknown	"Myanmar"	Benny Mouthon	CNN
2013	Crossfire Hurricane		Jason W. Jennings, Steve Pederson	HBO
2013	Deadliest Catch	"Mutiny on the Bering Sea"	Bob Bronow	Discovery
2013	Survivor	"Create a Little Chaos"	Terrance Dwyer	CBS
2014	American Masters	"Jimi Hendrix: Hear My Train A Comin'"	Eddie Kramer, Steve Crook	PBS
2014	The Amazing Race	"Part Like the Red Sea"	Jim Ursulak, Dean Gaveau, Jerry Masanky Chabane, Troy Smith	CBS
2014	Anthony Bourdain: Parts Unknown	"Tokyo"	Brian Bracken	CNN
2014	Cosmos: A Spacetime Odyssey	"Standing Up in the Milky Way"	Mark Hensley, Joel D. Catalan, Paul Aronoff, David Torres	Fox
2014	Deadliest Catch	"Careful What You Wish For"	Bob Bronow	Discovery
2015	Foo Fighters: Sonic Highways	"Seattle"	Fred Stuben, Jeffrey Fuller, Eddie Kim	HBO
2015	Anthony Bourdain: Parts Unknown	"Jamaica"	Brian Bracken	CNN
2015	Deadliest Catch	"Lost at Sea"	Bob Bronow	Discovery
2015	Going Clear: Scientology and the Prison of Belief		David Mitlyng, Tony Volante	HBO
2015	The Jinx: The Life and Deaths of Robert Durst	"Chapter 2: Poor Little Rich Boy"	Tim Hays, Paul Vik Marshall, Coll Anderson	HBO
2015	Kurt Cobain: Montage of Heck		Steve Pederson	HBO
2016	Vice	"Fighting ISIS"	Erik Schuiten	HBO
2016	Anthony Bourdain: Parts Unknown	"Ethiopia"	Benny Mouthon	CNN
2016	Deadliest Catch	"Carpe Diem"	Bob Bronow	Discovery
2016	Making a Murderer	"Lack of Humanity"	Leslie Shatz	Netflix
2016	What Happened, Miss Simone?		Tony Volante, Tammy Douglas	Netflix
2017	The Beatles: Eight Days a Week — The Touring Years		Chris Jenkins, Cameron Frankley, Nathan Evans, Sam O'Kell	Hulu
2017	Anthony Bourdain: Parts Unknown	"Rome"	Brian Bracken	CNN
2017	O.J.: Made in America	"Part 2"	Keith Hodne, Eric Di Stefano	ESPN
2017	Planet Earth II	"Cities"	Graham Wild	BBC America
2017	13th		Jeffrey Perkins	Netflix
2018
2018	Anthony Bourdain: Parts Unknown	"Lagos"	Benny Mouthon	CNN
2018	The Defiant Ones	"Episode 1"	Christopher Jenkins, Gabriel Andy Giner	HBO
2018	Jane		David E. Fluhr, Marc Fishman, Lee Smith, Derek Lee	Nat Geo
2018	The Vietnam War	"Episode 6: Things Fall Apart (January 1968-July 1968)"	Dominick Tavella	PBS
2018	Wild Wild Country	"Part 1"	Chapman Way	Netflix
2019
2019	Free Solo		Tom Fleischman, Ric Schnupp, Tyson Lozensky, Jim Hurst	Nat Geo
2019	Anthony Bourdain: Parts Unknown	"Kenya"	Brian Bracken	CNN
2019	Fyre: The Greatest Party That Never Happened		Tom Paul	Netflix
2019	Leaving Neverland		Matt Skilton, Marguerite Gaudin	HBO
2019	Our Planet	"One Planet"	Graham Wild	Netflix

=== 2020s ===
Year	Program	Episode	Nominees	Network
Primetime Emmy Award for Outstanding Sound Mixing for a Nonfiction or Reality Program (Single or Multi-Camera)
2020
2020	Apollo 11		Eric Milano	CNN
2020	Beastie Boys Story		William Tzouris, Jacob Feinberg and Martyn Zub	Apple TV+
2020	Cheer	"Daytona"	Ryan David Adams	Netflix
2020	Laurel Canyon: A Place in Time		Gary A. Rizzo, Stephen Urata, Danielle Dupre and Tony Villaflor	Epix
2020	RuPaul's Drag Race	"I'm That Bitch"	Glenn Gaines, Ryan Brady, Erik Valenzuela and Sal Ojeda	VH1
2020	Tiger King: Murder, Mayhem and Madness	"The Noble Thing to Do"	Jose Araujo, Royce Sharp, Jack Neu and Ian Cymore	Netflix
2021
2021	David Attenborough: A Life on Our Planet		Graham Wild	Netflix
2021	The Bee Gees: How Can You Mend a Broken Heart		Gary A. Rizzo, Jeff King and John Rampey	HBO
2021	Billie Eilish: The World's a Little Blurry		Elmo Ponsdomenech, Jason "Frenchie" Gaya, Aron Forbes and Jae Kim	Apple TV+
2021	Life Below Zero	"The Other Side"	Tony Crowe	Nat Geo
2021	Stanley Tucci: Searching for Italy	"Naples and the Amalfi Coast"	Tom O'Pray and Chris Gibbions	CNN
2021	Tina		Lawrence Everson and Phil McGowan	HBO
2022
2022	The Beatles: Get Back	"Part 3: Days 17-22"	Michael Hedges, Brent Burge, Alexis Feodoroff and Giles Martin	Disney+
2022	George Carlin's American Dream		Earl Martin, Jason Gaya, Brad Bergbom and Kevin Rosen Quan	HBO Max
2022	Lizzo's Watch Out for the Big Grrrls	"Becoming 100% That Bitch"	Erik Brena, Ross D'Alessandro, Julianne Kane and Deanna Decenario	Prime Video
2022	McCartney 3,2,1	"These Things Bring You Together"	Gary A. Rizzo and Laura Cunningham	Hulu
2022	RuPaul's Drag Race	"Big Opening #1"	Erik Valenzuela, David Nolte and Glenn Gaines	VH1
2022	Stanley Tucci: Searching for Italy	"Venice"	Tom O'Pray and Renato Ferrari	CNN
Primetime Emmy Award for Outstanding Sound Mixing for a Nonfiction Program (Single or Multi-Camera)
2023
2023	Moonage Daydream		Paul Massey and David Giammarco	HBO
2023	100 Foot Wave	"Chapter V: Lost at Sea"	Keith Hodne	HBO
2023	Stanley Tucci: Searching for Italy	"Calabria"	Matt Skilton and Christopher Syner	CNN
2023	The Sound of 007		Richard Davey, Jonny Horne, Simon Norman and Francesco Corazzi	Prime Video
2023	Still: A Michael J. Fox Movie		Skip Lievsay, Benjamin Berger, Martin Kittappa and Lily van Leeuwen	Apple TV+
Primetime Emmy Award for Outstanding Sound Mixing for a Nonfiction Program
2024
2024	The Beach Boys		Gary A. Rizzo, John Rampey, Sabi Tulok and Dennis Hamlin	Disney+
2024	Jim Henson Idea Man		Tony Volante and Michael Jones	Disney+
2024	Planet Earth III	"Deserts and Grasslands"	Graham Wild, Oliver Baldwin and Olga Reed	BBC America
2024	Stax: Soulsville U.S.A.	"Chapter Two: Soul Man"	Tony Volante and Andre Artis	HBO
2024	Steve! (Martin) A Documentary in 2 Pieces		Pete Horner, Dennis Hamlin, Barry London and Emily Strong	Apple TV+
2025
2025	Beatles '64		Josh Berger and Giles Martin	Disney+
2025	Music by John Williams		Roy Waldspurger, Christopher Barnett and Noah Alexander	Disney+
2025	100 Foot Wave	"Chapter III: Cortes Bank"	Keith Hodne	HBO
2025	Pee-wee as Himself		Johnny Mathie	HBO
2025	Yacht Rock: A Dockumentary (Music Box)		Tony Solis, Paul Stula and Barry London	HBO
2026
2026	Billy Joel: And So It Goes		Bob Chefalas, Mark Mandler, David Mitlyng, Michael Stewart, Bradshaw Leigh, Brian Ruggles and Jay Vicari	HBO
2026	John Candy: I Like Me		Gary A. Rizzo, Brad Dawe, Michael Kool, Mark Leone, Thomas Nino Orozco and Donny Tam	Prime Video
2026	Mel Brooks: The 99 Year Old Man!		Brad Bergbom, Dave McJunkin, Alenka Pavlin, Kevin Rosen-Quan, Earl Martin and Brian Tarlecki	HBO Max
2026	Ocean with David Attenborough		Graham Wild and Oliver Baldwin	Nat Geo
2026	Tucci in Italy	"Naples & Campania"	Ben Newth and Christopher Syner	Nat Geo

== Programs with multiple awards ==
4 awards

- American Masters

2 awards

- Deadliest Catch

== Individuals with multiple awards ==
3 awards

- Tom Fleischman

2 awards

- Giles Martin

== Programs with multiple nominations ==
11 nominations

- The Amazing Race

10 nominations

- Deadliest Catch

7 nominations

- Anthony Bourdain: Parts Unknown

6 nominations

- American Masters
- Survivor

3 nominations

- Stanley Tucci: Searching for Italy

2 nominations

- 100 Foot Wave
- RuPaul's Drag Race
