= Alan Bernard (disambiguation) =

Alan Bernard (1934–2011) was an American audio engineer.

Alan Bernard may also refer to:

- Alan Bernard, a character in Village of the Damned (1960 film)
- Alan Bernard, a character in Homeland (TV series)

== See also ==
- Alain Bernard (born 1983), French swimmer
