= 1985 in German television =

This is a list of German television related events from 1985.

== Events ==
- 21 March - Wind are selected to represent Germany at the 1985 Eurovision Song Contest with their song "Für alle". They are selected to be the thirtieth German Eurovision entry during Ein Lied für Göteborg held at the German Theatre in Munich.

== Debuts ==
=== ARD ===
- 7 January – Der Sonne entgegen (1985)
- 14 January – Gespenstergeschichten (1985)
- 31 January – Känguru (1985–1986)
- 22 March – ...Erbin sein - dagegen sehr (1985)
- 3 April – Schöne Ferien (1985)
- 25 April – Zentrale Bangkok (1985)
- 27 June – Ein Mann macht klar Schiff (1985–1986)
- July – War was, Rickie? (1985)
- 18 September – Levin und Gutman (1985)
- 11 October –
  - Ich, Christian Hahn (1985–1986)
  - Das Rätsel der Sandbank (1985)
- 15 November – Fritz Golgowsky (1985–1986)
- 8 December – Lindenstraße (1985–2020)

=== ZDF ===
- 23 January – Ein Heim für Tiere (1985–1992)
- 19 February – Der eiserne Weg (1985)
- 28 April – Glücklich geschieden (1985)
- 30 August – Alte Gauner (1985)
- 1 September – Via Mala (1985)
- 12 September – Die Nervensäge (1985–1986)
- 22 October – The Black Forest Clinic (1985–1989)
- 5 December – Oliver Maass (1985)

=== DFF ===
- 4 January – Die Leute von Züderow (1985)
- 27 January – Bei Hausers zu Hause (1985)
- 8 March – Johann Sebastian Bach (1985)
- 17 May – Zahn um Zahn (1985–1988)
- 10 November – Der Sohn des Schützen (1985)

=== International ===
- 2 January - (United States) The Love Boat (1977–1986) (Sat.1)
- 29 May - (United States) Hill Street Blues (1981–1987) (ZDF)
- 27 August - (United Kingdom) Danger Mouse (1981–1992) (ZDF)

=== BFBS ===
- 19 May - (United Kingdom) Bertha (1985–1986)
- (United Kingdom) T-Bag (1985–1992)
- (United Kingdom) Who Sir? Me Sir? (1985)
- (Spain) / (Japan) Dogtanian and the Three Muskehounds (1981–1982)
- (United Kingdom) Dodger, Bonzo and the Rest (1985–1986)
- (United Kingdom) Puddle Lane (1985–1989)
- (United Kingdom) Mop and Smiff (1985)
- (United Kingdom) Tales from Fat Tulip's Garden (1985)
- (United Kingdom) Dempsey and Makepeace (1985–1986)
- (United Kingdom) Gems (1985–1988)
- (United Kingdom) EastEnders (1985–present)

== Television shows ==
=== 1950s ===
- Tagesschau (1952–present)

=== 1960s ===
- heute (1963-present)

=== 1970s ===
- heute-journal (1978-present)
- Tagesthemen (1978-present)

=== 1980s ===
- Wetten, dass..? (1981-2014)

== Networks and services ==
=== Launches ===
Network	Type	Launch date	Notes	Source
Europa TV	Cable television	5 October		
