= 1985 in Scotland =

- Centuries: 18th; 19th; 20th; 21st
- Decades: 1960s; 1970s; 1980s; 1990s; 2000s
- See also: List of years in Scotland; Timeline of Scottish history 1985 in: The UK • England • Wales • Elsewhere; Scottish football: 1984–85 • 1985–86; 1985 in Scottish television

Events from the year 1985 in Scotland.

== Incumbents ==
- Secretary of State for Scotland and Keeper of the Great Seal – George Younger

=== Law officers ===
- Lord Advocate – Lord Cameron of Lochbroom
- Solicitor General for Scotland – Peter Fraser

=== Judiciary ===
- Lord President of the Court of Session and Lord Justice General – Lord Emslie
- Lord Justice Clerk – Lord Wheatley, then Lord Ross
- Chairman of the Scottish Land Court – Lord Elliott

== Events ==
- 1 June – Scottish Bus Group reorganised into new regional companies.
- 6 September – the Scottish Exhibition and Conference Centre opens in Glasgow.
- 10 September – Scotland national football team manager Jock Stein, 62, collapses and dies from a heart attack at the end of his team's 1–1 draw with Wales at Ninian Park, Cardiff, which secures Scotland's place in the World Cup qualification playoff.
- 20 November – the Scotland national football team, managed on an interim basis by Aberdeen boss Alex Ferguson, beats Australia 2–0 in the World Cup qualifying play-off first leg at Hampden Park with goals from Davie Cooper (who scored in the game against Wales two months ago) and the debutant Frank McAvennie.
- Mossmorran NGL (natural gas liquids) fractionation plant at Cowdenbeath opens.

== Births ==
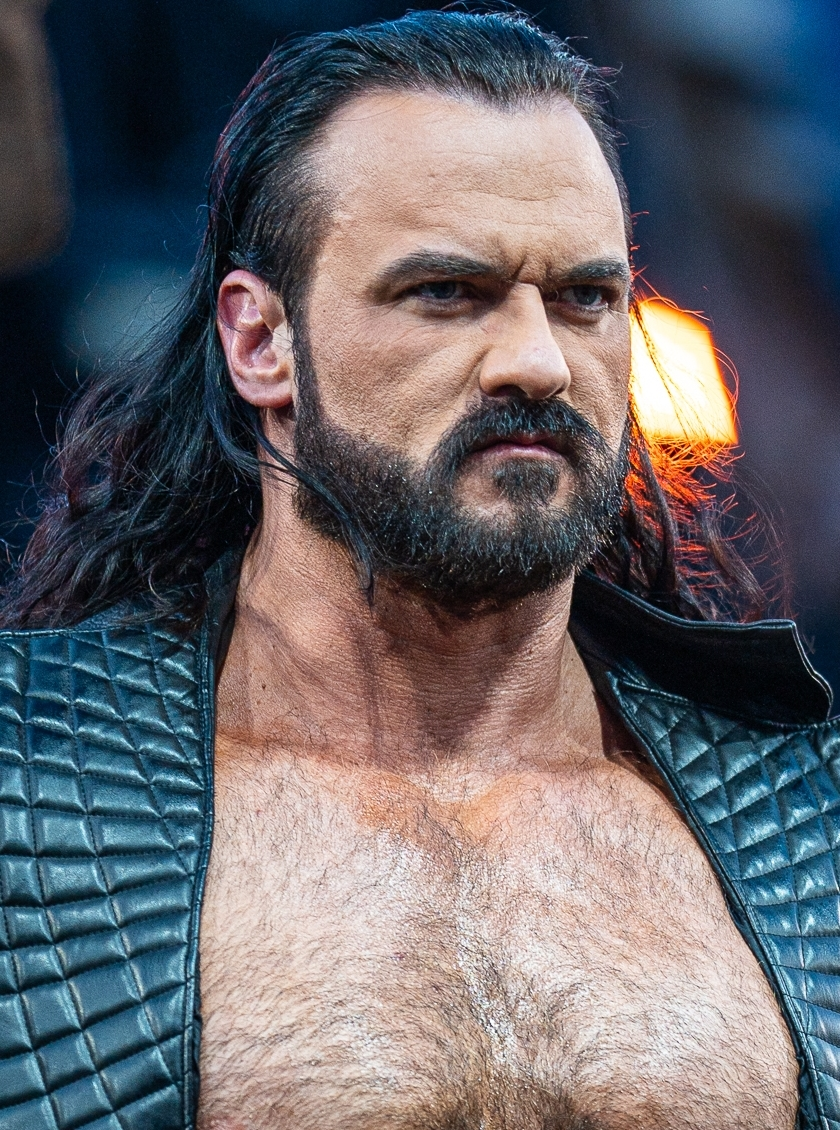
Drew McIntyre

- 16 January – Amy Manson, television actress
- 10 February – Cath Rae, field hockey goalkeeper
- 2 April – Thom Evans, Zimbabwean-Scottish rugby player
- 7 April – Humza Yousaf, Scottish National Party leader
- 6 June – Drew McIntyre, pro wrestler
- 23 November – Scott Brash, showjumper

== Deaths ==
- 27 January – Robert McLellan, playwright (born 1907)
- 29 January – Chic Murray, comedian (born 1919)
- 7 April – Willie McRae, Scottish National Party politician and lawyer (born 1923)
- 2 July – Hector Nicol, entertainer (born 1920)
- 10 September – Jock Stein, football player and manager (born 1922)
- 7 November – Alexander Thom, aerodynamicist and archaeoastronomer (born 1894)
- 24 December – Erich Schaedler, football player, by suicide (born 1949)

== The arts ==
- 10 May – first performance of Peter Maxwell Davies' orchestral piece An Orkney Wedding, with Sunrise.
- 11 August – a memorial to Hugh MacDiarmid is unveiled near his home at Langholm.
- The Scots Language Society publishes a set of consensus guidelines for spelling Modern Scots, Recommendations for Writers in Scots.
- Deacon Blue form in Glasgow.

== See also ==
- 1985 in Northern Ireland
