= O.J.: Made in America (soundtrack) =

O.J.: Made in America (Original Motion Picture Soundtrack)

Film score by Gary Lionelli
- Released: June 6, 2016
- Recorded: 2015–2016
- Genre: Film score
- Length: 70:09
- Label: Lakeshore
- Producer: Gary Lionelli

Gary Lionelli chronology
Kareem: Minority of One (2016)	O.J.: Made in America (2016)	Hate Rising (2016)

O.J.: Made in America (Original Motion Picture Soundtrack) is the score album to the 2016 documentary film of the same name directed by Ezra Edelman for ESPN Films and their 30 for 30 series, that documents the life of O. J. Simpson. It featured music composed by Gary Lionelli. The album consisting of 40 tracks of his score was released by Lakeshore Records on June 6, 2016. It received critical acclaim and a nomination for Outstanding Music Composition for a Limited Series, Movie, or Special at the 69th Primetime Emmy Awards.

== Development ==
Gary Lionelli felt it challenging to "score an epic real-life saga" revolving O. J. Simpson's life progressing through emerging football career, popularity and downfall as he do not want to "sensationalize it or trivialize it in any way" but to focus on the overall tragedy on the circumstances and let that direct the course of the music. Edelman did not want the score to subtext the character or the scene but to comment musically on what is happening in the scene, which is "scoring what is going on in the mind of the character rather than what he or she is doing, or scoring the impact or consequence of an event rather simply the action of the event".

Every score I create has its own personality that is hard to recognize at the beginning that emerges throughout the process. This score has a certain tragic heaviness to it that other films I have scored did not have to that level. It was such a far-reaching national event dealing with some of the biggest issues of our time like race relations, so it was a heavy film. I think the score ended up being a tragic commentary.

— Gary Lionelli on the score for O.J.:Made In America

Lionelli had recalled the Edelman had wanted solo trumpet and oboe in the score, specifically. Jeff Bunnell played the trumpet in specific cues that consisted strings and piano, set in "a lyrical, introspective, and detached style" that it had an "effect of a forewarning about O.J.’s ultimate fall from his once great heights". He wanted a jazzy sense without creating specifically a jazz score, as the trumpet cues signify some sadness and loneliness in its cues, which was very "eclectic". A collection of acoustic instruments, such as bass marimba, vibraphone, bass steel drum, toy piano, hang drum, guitar-viol has been integrated into the score instead of playing samples, and also manipulated those sounds using effects and plug-ins for time consumption to conjure up cues because of trial-and-error methods that involved in creating new sounds, but give the film an identity beyond orchestral music. He further used a 40-piece string section along with various soloists for oboe, clarinet, cello, and trumpet, thereby blending introspective jazz, electronic and orchestra and all of them in the same cue. The score was recorded at the Eastwood Scoring Stage in Warner Bros. Studios, Los Angeles.

Lionelli found it difficult to score the film due to its lengthy runtime, and also had to be completed within three months. Since the film's runtime is around 467 minutes (nearly 7 hours and 47 minutes) long, he had to write nearly six hours of music. Most documentaries require 80 percent of the film to have music and he had to fight for time. Hence, he managed to get the deadline extended to over five months, set within ten days of the theatrical debut. He wrote 15 hours of music for the film in a single day and also worked for all-seven days in a week, and also had to set time for the orchestra, which he called it as "an extremely tight schedule". In the time frame, over 173 cues were written for the film. When Lionelli asked the debate on whether the film is either miniseries or television film and how it impacted on his process, he said that "When I was working on it, I didn’t have a cut that had breaks for commercial. It was one very long film, and that’s how it played in theatres but with an intermission. To me conceptually, it was just one film, and that is how it was envisioned. So my creative process never wavered or changed."

Keith Hodne re-recorded and mixed those cues in the film. Since, Lionelli was working on the film's music when the film was played at film festivals, he then mixed the music for the film thrice. One featured temp music, the second that had Gary's score with sampled strings, and the final mixing happened when the actual strings were recorded, and acknowledged its impact on the film.

== Track listing ==
No.	Title	Length
1.	"Made in America"	2:19
2.	"Family"	1:51
3.	"Verdict"	1:13
4.	"Infamous"	1:52
5.	"Land of Milk and Honey"	0:42
6.	"Epic Fall"	2:33
7.	"Control"	1:03
8.	"Buffalo Baryshnikov"	1:59
9.	"Rockingham"	3:32
10.	"Two Worlds"	2:19
11.	"Vegas"	0:53
12.	"Stone-Faced"	1:16
13.	"He Got a Motorcade"	1:57
14.	"Viewing"	1:59
15.	"Talking Him Down"	2:40
16.	"When They First Met"	2:00
17.	"Gun Under His Chin"	1:44
18.	"Surrender in the Night"	1:37
19.	"Nothing Tops This"	0:40
20.	"Trial"	1:11
21.	"Infidelity"	2:19
22.	"Black Protests"	1:45
23.	"Room 1203"	2:22
24.	"Finish It One Way or Another"	1:14
25.	"Spying"	1:52
26.	"Burn Baby Burn"	1:29
27.	"Watts Riots"	1:39
28.	"Beyond Football"	2:02
29.	"Merely a Tool"	1:31
30.	"The Closer"	1:31
31.	"Last Place"	1:49
32.	"Waiting for Surrender"	1:39
33.	"Excessive Force"	1:51
34.	"Operation Hammer"	1:48
35.	"Never Saw a Gun"	0:58
36.	"Detective Fuhrman"	1:28
37.	"The n Word"	1:41
38.	"Subtext"	1:22
39.	"White Justice"	1:51
40.	"Please Remember Me as a Good Guy"	2:38
Total length:		70:09

== Accolades ==
Lionelli's score was one of the 145 contenders for the Best Original Score category at the 89th Academy Awards, but ultimately could not get selected.

Award	Date of ceremony	Category	Recipient(s)	Result	Ref.
Cinema Eye Honors	January 11, 2017	Outstanding Achievement in Original Music Score	Gary Lionelli	Nominated	
Primetime Emmy Awards	September 17, 2017	Outstanding Music Composition for a Limited Series, Movie, or Special	Gary Lionelli	Nominated	
Primetime Emmy Awards	September 17, 2017	Outstanding Sound Mixing for a Nonfiction Program	Keith Hodne and Eric Di Stefano	Nominated	
