= The Savage Bees =

1976 television film by Bruce Geller

- Film poster
- Written by: Guerdon Trueblood
- Directed by: Bruce Geller
- Starring: Ben Johnson; Michael Parks; Paul Hecht; Gretchen Corbett; Horst Buchholz
- Composer: Walter Murphy
- Country of origin: United States
- Original language: English

Production
- Executive producers: Alan Landsburg; Don Kirshner; Merrill Grant
- Producer: Bruce Geller
- Cinematography: Richard C. Glouner
- Editors: George Hively; Bud Friedgen
- Running time: 90 minutes
- Production companies: Alan Landsburg Productions; Don Kirshner Productions

Original release
- Network: NBC
- Release: November 22, 1976

Related
- Terror Out of the Sky

The Savage Bees is a 1976 American natural horror television film directed and produced by Bruce Geller and written by Guerdon Trueblood. The film stars Ben Johnson, Michael Parks, Paul Hecht, Gretchen Corbett, and Horst Buchholz. It follows a swarm of killer bees threatening people during Mardi Gras in New Orleans.

== Plot ==
The Carlina Rios, a Brazilian trawler, drifts into the Mississippi River Delta near New Orleans, where it is accidentally rammed and sunk by a freighter, the Eastern Hornet. The Coast Guard investigates the wreck, but finds no surviving crew members, and the first mate and quartermaster of the Eastern Hornet mysteriously disappear during the incident. Shortly afterwards, people and animals, including local Sheriff McKew's dog, are found dead, their bodies riddled with insect sting wounds. McKew brings his dog to coroner Jeff DuRand, who discovers a massive amount of bees inside the animal's stomach.

DuRand calls Jeannie Devereaux, an entomologist and former girlfriend, to have her assist him in his investigation. He also warns the police, but the sceptical lieutenant in charge refuses to warn the population because the Mardi Gras festival is already in full swing in the city. McKew and DuRand decide to conduct their own search, assisted by Devereaux and her colleague Rufus Carter, who discover that these insects are results of an aborted experiment at crossbreeding and importing this new strain to Brazil for increased honey production about ten years ago. However, these Africanized bees underwent unchecked crossbreeding with local bees, producing an extremely aggressive subspecies which are agitated by loud noise. However, Carter cautions DuRand to refrain from warning the populace for fear of overreactive killing of even harmless bees, which would result in a nationwide decline of pollination and, therefore, food production.

With this alarming fact in hand, DuRand and Devereaux inform Deputy Mayor Pelligrino of the danger, but he refuses to help, so they summon Dr. Jorge Meuller, one of the scientists responsible for the creation of the bees. Meuller plans to introduce a new queen to the swarm after it is located, initiating a new crossbreeding to eliminate the swarm's natural aggressiveness; simply killing the current queen would result in the swarm dispersing all over the country, leading to a wider spread and the eventual return of the danger. As they contemplate what to do next, DuRand and Devereaux end up rekindling their relationship.

McKew organizes his deputies into search parties to find the killer bees, which are eventually located in a snack stand outside the city. Meuller enters the hive, but then two overenthusiastic Mardi Gras visitors barrel through the roadblocks and enter the stand, agitating the bees. In the ensuing mayhem, one of the panicked tourists compromises Meuller's protective suit, resulting in all three of them getting stung to death. Forced to watch helplessly, Devereaux accidentally hits the horn of her car, luring the bees to her and making them cover the vehicle. With the entire swarm concentrated on the car, Carter suggests driving it to a location where they can drastically lower the ambient temperature, thus freezing the bees into lethargy.

Using walkie-talkies, DuRand directs Deveraux into driving to the Caesars Superdome while he and McKew clear the streets of pedestrians. Just in sight of the stadium, the bees end up stalling the engine, forcing DuRand to use a police cruiser to carefully push her forward. Once inside the playing field, the cooling system is turned up, freezing the swarm. As the relieved DuRand and Deveraux prepare to exit the stadium, a single bee is shown having escaped the freezing trap.

== Cast ==
- Michael Parks as Dr. Jeff DuRand
- Gretchen Corbett as Jeannie Devereaux
- Ben Johnson as Sheriff Donald McKew
- Paul Hecht as Dr. Rufus Carter
- Horst Buchholz as Dr. Jorge Meuller
- Bruce French as Police Lieutenant
- James Best as Deputy Mayor Pelligrino
- David L. Gray as Coast Guard Lieutenant
- Richard Charles Boyle as Coast Guard Chief
- Eliott Keener as Freighter Boatswain
- Boardman O'Connor as Freighter Captain
- Danny Barker as Taxicab Driver
- Don Hood as Deputy Churn
- Bill Holliday as Deputy Stilt
- Carol Sutton as Mrs. Compher
- Tiffany Gautier Chase as Julie Compher
- Shirl Cieutat as Mrs. Bryant

== Release ==
The Savage Bees premiered on NBC in the United States on November 22, 1976, as part of Monday Night at the Movies. The film was theatrically released in the United Kingdom by Columbia-Warner Distributors on April 23, 1978.

== Awards and nominations ==
Year	Award	Category	Recipients	Result	Ref.
1977	29th Primetime Creative Arts Emmy Awards	Outstanding Achievement in Film Sound Mixing	Alan Bernard; Robert L. Harman; Eddie J. Nelson; George E. Porter	Won	

== Sequel ==
A sequel, titled Terror Out of the Sky, was directed by Lee H. Katzin and written by Guerdon Trueblood and Doris Silverton. It premiered on CBS in the United States on December 26, 1978.

=== Cast ===
- Efrem Zimbalist Jr. as David Martin
- Dan Haggerty as Nick Willis
- Tovah Feldshuh as Jeannie Devereux
- Lonny Chapman as Earl Logan
- Ike Eisenmann as Eric Mangus
- Joe E. Tata as Groves
- Richard Herd as Col. Mangus
- Charles Hallahan as Tibbles Sr.
- Bruce French as Eli Nathanson
- Steve Franken as Paul Gladstone
