= 1985 in Philippine television =

The following is a list of events affecting Philippine television in 1985. Events listed include television show debuts, finales, cancellations, and channel launches, closures and rebrandings, as well as information about controversies and carriage disputes.

== Premieres ==
| Date | Show | Refs |
|---|---|---|
| June 16 | 3 O'Clock Habit (broadcast syndication aired on some Radio and Television stations) | |
| July 1 | Ang Bagong Kampeon on RPN 9 | |
| August 5 | Amorsola on GMA 7 | |
| September 16 | Mirasol del Cielo on GMA 7 | |
| October 6 | Goin' Bananas on BBC 2 | |

=== Unknown date ===
- February: Batibot on MBS 4 and RPN 9

=== Unknown ===
- Andrea Amor on BBC 2
- Banana Sundae on BBC 2
- I Am What I Am on BBC 2
- Lotlot & Friends on RPN 9
- Dr. Potpot and the Satellite Kid on RPN 9
- Cooking It Up With Nora Daza on RPN 9
- Lutong Bahay on RPN 9
- The Chaplet of the Divine Mercy on RPN 9
- Jesus I Trust In You on RPN 9
- Sunday Mass on RPN 9
- Pointblank on IBC 13
- Don Kamote de la Mantsa on IBC 13
- True or False on IBC 13
- Gabi ng Lagim on GMA 7
- Kumander Toothpick on GMA 7
- Regal Shockers on GMA 7
- Late Night with June & Johnny on GMA 7
- Not So Late Night with Edu on GMA 7
- Pass the Mike with JQ and Willie on GMA 7
- Ecotrends on GMA 7
- Movies to Watch on GMA 7
- Highway to Heaven on GMA 7
- 227 on GMA 7
- Manila Envelope on MBS 4
- Palarong Pintakasi on MBS 4

== Returning or renamed programs ==
| Show | Last aired | Retitled as/Season/Notes | Channel | Return date | Refs |
|---|---|---|---|---|---|
| Sesame! | 1984 | Batibot | MBS / RPN | February | |
| Philippine Basketball Association | 1984 (season 10: "Invitational") | Same (season 11: "Open Conference") | MBS | March 3 | |
| Major League Baseball | 1984 (City2) | Same (1985 season) | MBS | April 7 | |
| Philippine Basketball Association | 1985 (season 11: "Open Conference") | Same (season 11: "All-Filipino Conference") | MBS | June 23 | |
| Philippine Basketball Association | 1985 (season 11: "All-Filipino Conference") | Same (season 11: "Reinforced Conference") | MBS | September 8 | |
| Banana Sundae | 1985 | Goin' Bananas | BBC | October 6 | |

== Finales ==
- August 2: Yagit on GMA 7
- August 29: Champoy on RPN 9
- September 13: Anna Liza on GMA 7
- September 29: Banana Sundae on BBC 2

=== Unknown ===
- Andrea Amor on BBC 2
- Gulong ng Palad on BBC 2
- Spin-A-Win on RPN 9
- NewsWatch Pilipino Edition on RPN 9
- Paglipas ng Panahon on RPN 9
- Talambuhay on RPN 9
- Nora Cinderella on RPN 9
- Dr. Potpot and the Satellite Kid on RPN 9
- Isyu on RPN 9
- Church of God on RPN 9
- Don Kamote de la Mantsa on IBC 13
- True or False on IBC 13
- Jimmy Swaggart on IBC 13
- Study In The Word on IBC 13
- True Confessions ng mga Bituin on GMA 7
- Mga Alagad ni Kalantiao on GMA 7
- Kumander Toothpick on GMA 7
- Real People on GMA 7
- Saturday Matinee on GMA 7
- Sining Siete on GMA 7
- Little House on the Prairie on GMA 7
- Three's Company on GMA 7
- NFL on GMA on GMA 7
- Ang Batasan on MBS 4
- Love, Lea on MBS 4
- She on MBS 4
- Ito-Iyon: Ang Galing! on MBS 4
- MBS Sports on MBS 4

== Births ==
- January 14 – Jason Abalos, television actor
- January 16 – Stefano Mori Filipino actor and singer
- January 20 – Roxanne Barcelo, Filipino-American singer and actress
- February 14 – Heart Evangelista, Chinese-Filipino singer, actress and TV show host
- February 17 – Anne Curtis, actress, singer, model and TV show host
- March 10 – Christian Esteban, broadcaster, TV personality
- April 7 – KC Concepcion, singer and actress; currently the Philippines Goodwill Ambassador against hunger of the UN's World Food Programme
- April 16 – JC Tiuseco, Chinese Filipino actor, basketball player, TV show host and model
- April 23 – Angel Locsin, actress and commercial model
- May 17 - Wej Cudiamat, news anchor and broadcaster
- June 6 – Victor Basa, actor
- June 20 – Camille Prats, actress
- June 23 – Laarni Lozada, singer
- June 25 – Ehra Madrigal, actress
- July 12 – Marco Alcaraz, actor, model, basketball player
- July 15 – Chris Tiu, professional basketball player, TV show host and commercial model
- August 15 – Cogie Domingo, actor
- September 3 – Carlo Aquino, actor and singer
- September 5 – John Medina, actor
- September 7 – Neri Naig, actress
- September 21 – Michelle Ayalde, singer and TV Host
- October 21 – Rainier Castillo, actor and dancer
- November 5 – Patricia Fernandez, actress

== Deaths ==
- May 6 – Julie Vega, child actress and singer (b. 1968)

== See also ==
- 1985 in television
