= 1985 in Scottish television =

This is a list of events in Scottish television from 1985.

== Events ==
=== January ===
- 4 January – The last 405-line transmissions take place in Scotland. The switch-off sees the ending of television signals being radiated from the Kirk o' Shotts transmitting station.

=== February ===
- 18 February – BBC One Scotland changes its name back to BBC 1 Scotland.

=== April ===
- April – Grampian Television introduces a new computerised logo.

=== August ===
- 31 August – Scottish Television changes its "STV" logo to the computerised "thistle" design.

=== October ===
- October – Increased funding for programmes in Gaelic results in the introduction of a weekday 20-minute morning slot of Gaelic children's programmes on BBC One Scotland. The programmes are generally shown in term-time before Play School, starting at 10:10 am.

=== November ===
- 2 November – Scottish Television announce that Gus Macdonald will take up the post of director of programmes

== Television series ==
- Scotsport (1957–2008)
- Reporting Scotland (1968–1983; 1984–present)
- Top Club (1971–1998)
- Scotland Today (1972–2009)
- Sportscene (1975–present)
- The Beechgrove Garden (1978–present)
- Grampian Today (1980–2009)
- Take the High Road (1980–2003)
- Now You See It (1981–1986)
- Taggart (1983–2010)
- Crossfire on Grampian (1984–2004)
- City Lights (1984–1991)

== Births ==
- 20 March – Phil MacHugh, television presenter

== Deaths ==
- 26 January – Chic Murray, 65, comedian and actor

== See also ==
- 1985 in Scotland
