= Phil MacHugh =

Scottish television presenter (born 1987)

Phil MacHugh (born 20 March 1983 in Glasgow, Scotland) is a Scottish television presenter, and media consultant.

== Early life ==
MacHugh's uncle is Mick MacNeil of Simple Minds. From the aged of 15 he appeared on local on Gaelic television. Later he was involved with Smash Hits TV, BBC Scotland's @Ire and Dè a-nis?, and BBC Choice's Beyond 2000. He also had presenting jobs on Splaoid and Nochd Gun Chadal.

== Career ==
After a career break to study journalism at Edinburgh's Napier University, MacHugh had a brief seasonal stint for E4 Edinburgh Festival coverage and contributed to entertainment news at Channel 5. He worked on strands for short-lived Scottish TV magazine show You have to do this..., and appeared in the VisitScotland Tartan Week in New York City for NBC, presenting live segments from Grand Central Station. He once presented a segment for the BBC One countryside show Landward, while it was at the Royal Highland Show in Edinburgh.

In 2022 Martin Compston was commissioned by BBC for a new travel series Martin Compston's Scottish Fling where he travelled the country with longterm friend MacHugh. They have filmed two series to far, in Scotland and in Norway.

MacHugh played a lead in CBBC Scotland's children's programme SNAS, based around a Scottish rock band. He also had a role as "James in the BBC Drama Consider the Lilies.

As a Highland dancer McHugh has been involved in VisitScotland and Glasgow City Council promotions at International Celtic festivals, and in November 2007 worked for the Lithuanian Television Network LNK and businessman Vladimir Romanov on the Baltic version of the popular TV show Strictly Come Dancing as a "creative director". Romanov won the Celebrity Dance competition.

In 2013 MacHugh joined the Yes Campaign as a PR and Events Manager for the Independence campaign. In 2016 he set up SKAPA, specialising in brand PR with clients including Pentahotels Group, Living Ventures, Principal Hotels, Barbour and Toni & Guy.

== Personal life ==
In 2009 MacHugh was the 50th on The Scotsman's 50 Most Eligible Bachelors. One of the local Torch Bearers for the 2012 Summer Olympics, he ran in Edinburgh as part of the UK torchbearing celebrations.
