= Cath Rae =

Scottish field hockey player

Catherine Rae (born 10 February 1985 in Aberdeen) is a female field hockey goalkeeper from Scotland.

She played club hockey for Grange Edinburgh Ladies then Kelburne Hockey Club.

She made her debut for the Women's National Team in 2006. Rae was awarded Goalkeeper of the Tournament at both the 2004 U21 European Championships and the 2001 U16 European Championships.
