= John Asman =

American sound engineer

- Occupation: Sound engineer
- Relatives: Bub Asman (brother)

John Asman is an American sound engineer. He won four Primetime Emmy Awards and was nominated for seventeen more in the category Outstanding Sound Mixing.

In 1994, Asman was awarded the Academy Award for Technical Achievement.
