= Hoppy Mehterian =

American sound engineer

- Occupation: Sound engineer
- Years active: 1965–1988

Hoppy Mehterian is an American sound engineer. He was nominated for ten Primetime Emmy Awards in the category Outstanding Sound Mixing.

== Filmography ==
- The Evictors (1979)
- Up from the Depths (1979)
- Swap Meet (1979)
- The Jerk (1979)
- Losin' It (1982)
- Wavelength (1983)
- Dreamscape (1984)
- Body Rock (1984)
- Girls Just Want to Have Fun (1985)
- Medium Rare (1988)
