= 1985 in Norwegian television =

This is a list of Norwegian television related events from 1985.

== Events ==
- 4 May – Norway wins the 30th Eurovision Song Contest in Gothenburg, Sweden. The winning song is "La det swinge", performed by Bobbysocks!.

== See also ==
- 1985 in Norway
