= Bill Marky =

American sound engineer (1938–2001)

- Born: William B. Marky; July 9, 1938
- Died: August 5, 2001 (aged 63); Reseda, California, U.S.
- Occupation: Sound engineer
- Children: 1

William B. Marky (July 9, 1938 – August 5, 2001) was an American sound engineer. He won two Primetime Emmy Awards and was nominated for two more in the category Outstanding Sound Mixing for his work on the television program Hill Street Blues. Marky died in August 2001, after being shot at his family's home in Reseda, California, at the age of 63. His son was later convicted of murder for the shooting.
