= Der Sonne entgegen =

- Country of origin: Germany

Der Sonne entgegen is a German television series.

== See also ==
- List of German television series
