= Zentrale Bangkok =

- Country of origin: Germany

Zentrale Bangkok was a German television series that starred Sabine Thiesler.

== Cast ==
- Michael Kausch as Friedemann Weber
- Wolfgang Bathke as Charly
- Holger Mahlich as Harald Bauer
- Micaela Kreißler as Uschi
- Ulrich von Dobschütz as Klaus Köhler
- Piero von Arnim as David Shaw
- Sabine Thiesler as Birgit Mahler
- Chaiwat Thirapantu as Narong
