= Eddie J. Nelson =

American sound engineer

- Occupation: Sound engineer
- Years active: 1944–1980

Eddie J. Nelson is an American sound engineer. He won four Primetime Emmy Awards and was nominated for thirteen more in the category Outstanding Sound Mixing.

== Filmography ==
- Guest in the House (1944)
- Captain Kidd (1945)
- White Pongo (1945)
- Apology for Murder (1945)
- The Story of G.I. Joe (1945)
- Guest Wife (1945)
- Paris Underground (1945)
- The Bachelor's Daughters (1946)
- The Red House (1947)
- California Dreaming (1979)
- The Evictors (1979)
- The Jerk (1979)
- Amber Waves (1980)
