= George E. Porter =

American sound engineer

- Occupation: Sound engineer
- Years active: 1965–1980

George E. Porter is an American sound engineer. He won four Primetime Emmy Awards and was nominated for eighteen more in the category Outstanding Sound Mixing.

== Filmography ==
- Summer Children (1965)
- Lions Love (1969)
- Angels Die Hard (1970)
- The Thing with Two Heads (1972)
- Dirty Little Billy (1972)
- Jennifer (1978)
- California Dreaming (1979)
- The Evictors (1979)
- Amber Waves (1980)
