= Alan Bernard =

Canadian-born American sound engineer

- Born: January 30, 1934; Windsor, Ontario, Canada
- Died: December 11, 2011 (aged 77); Los Angeles, California, U.S.
- Occupation: Sound engineer
- Children: 1

Alan Bernard (January 30, 1934 – December 11, 2011) was a Canadian-born American sound engineer. He won five Primetime Emmy Awards and was nominated for eight more in the category Outstanding Sound Mixing for his work on the television programs The Winds of War, Crime Story, Star Trek: The Next Generation, Star Trek: Voyager and also the television films The Savage Bees, Having Babies II, Baby Comes Home and The Jesse Owens Story.

Bernard died in December 2011 in Los Angeles, California, at the age of 77.
