= Robert L. Harman =

American sound engineer

- Born: February 10, 1939; Los Angeles, California, U.S.
- Died: January 9, 2006 (aged 66); Burbank, California, U.S.
- Occupation: Sound engineer
- Years active: 1973–2006
- Spouse: Carol Harman
- Children: 2

Robert L. Harman (February 10, 1939 – January 9, 2006) was an American sound engineer. He was nominated for Primetime Emmy Awards for sound mixing 23 times, winning on three occasions. Harman died in January 2006 in Burbank, California, at the age of 66.
