= The Evictors =

- Directed by: Charles B. Pierce
- Written by: Charles B. Pierce; Garry Rusoff; Paul Fisk
- Produced by: Charles B. Pierce
- Starring: Vic Morrow; Michael Parks; Jessica Harper; Sue Ane Langdon
- Cinematography: Charles B. Pierce
- Music by: Jaime Mendoza-Nava
- Distributed by: American International Pictures
- Release date: March 30, 1979
- Running time: 92 minutes
- Country: United States
- Language: English

The Evictors is a 1979 American Southern Gothic horror film written and directed by Charles B. Pierce, and starring Vic Morrow, Michael Parks, and Jessica Harper. A period piece set in 1942, it follows a couple who are terrorized by a mysterious man on the property of their new home in rural Louisiana, which is the site of various unsolved homicides from years prior.

Released in March 1979, it was among the last films distributed by American International Pictures before it was acquired by Filmways.

== Plot ==
In 1928 in rural Louisiana, the Monroe family face foreclosure on their farmhouse, leading to a violent shootout with police on the property.

In 1942, real estate agent Jake Rudd sells the home to young couple Ben and Ruth Watkins. Shortly after moving in, Ruth finds a threatening note in the mailbox reading: "I want you to move." Ruth soon witnesses a strange man prowling on the property, and is alarmed upon learning that the home's previous owners were murdered in 1934. While Ben is traveling to Arkansas on business, Ruth visits next-door neighbor Olie Gibson, an infirm elderly widow. Olie recounts the 1934 murders to Ruth, as well as the mysterious deaths of the subsequent owners, Frank and Ethel Reinhart, during Christmas 1939: Frank was mysteriously electrocuted, while Ethel was burned alive in a shed.

The following day, Ruth hears footsteps coming from the second floor of the house before seeing a strange man standing at the top of the staircase landing. Terrified, Ruth flees to Olie's house and awaits Ben's return that night. Olie offers the couple a rifle for protection, and upon inspecting the house, Ben finds no signs of the prowler. To assure Ruth's safety, Ben purchases her a revolver and teaches her how to shoot.

While Ben is working late one night, leaving Ruth alone, the prowler returns, armed with a machete. Ben returns to the house during the prowler's intrusion, and is inadvertently shot by Ruth. The prowler chases Ruth upstairs, where he corners her in the bedroom and begins to cut off her blouse, but he is stopped when a dying Ben shoots him, causing him to fall through a window. The prowler survives the fall and flees, while Ben subsequently dies at the hospital.

After Ben's funeral, Olie returns home to the injured prowler, who is in fact Dwayne Monroe. It is revealed that Olie is Anna Monroe, disguised as a spinster, and Dwayne, her husband. Having survived the 1928 shootout, Dwayne and Anna, along with Dwayne's brother, Todd—posing as Jake the real estate agent—have been running a real estate scam for decades. Todd sells the old Monroe house to unsuspecting young couples, while Anna befriends the new tenants to learn more about them, and Dwayne terrorizes, harasses, and eventually murders the new owners, enabling Todd to buy back the house and live off the sale proceeds which he splits with Anna and Dwayne. During a scuffle, Dwayne murders Anna and then goes after Ruth, only for Todd to shoot and kill him in self-defense.

Five years later, Ruth has remarried to "Jake", unaware of his true identity. One day, Mr. and Mrs. Bumford arrive at the real estate office to pay cash for the Monroe house. The following year, Mrs. Bumford is found dead in a well behind the house, and Mr. Bumford dies three months later in an apparent suicide. The house remains vacant.

== Cast ==
- Vic Morrow as Jake Rudd / Todd Monroe
- Michael Parks as Ben Watkins
- Jessica Harper as Ruth Watkins
- Sue Ane Langdon as Olie Gibson / Anna Monroe
- Dennis Fimple as Wilbur Bamford
- Bill Thurman as Preacher Higgins
- Glen Roberts as Dwayne Monroe
- Roxanne Harter as Ethel Reinhart
- John Milam as Frank Reinhart
- Ron White as G-Man

== Production ==
Principal photography of The Evictors took place in December 1978 in Waskom, Texas, under the working title The Eviction.

== Release ==
The Evictors screened in the United States beginning March 30, 1979 in Florida and New Mexico. It had its Los Angeles premiere on September 21, 1979. It later screened in Nanaimo, British Columbia in October 1979, paired as a double bill with The Amityville Horror (1979).

=== Home media ===
Scream Factory has released the film on DVD as a bonus film in the Blu-ray combination pack of The Town That Dreaded Sundown in 2013. Scream Factory released a standalone Blu-ray edition on June 27, 2017. This disc went out of print on May 7, 2021.

== Reception ==
=== Critical response ===
Bill von Maurer of The Miami News wrote: "The Evictors turns out to be a tidy little thriller movie that avoids cliches about haunted houses," but conceded that it "isn't a white-knuckle kind of thriller and it has its weak points you could punch holes in, but on the whole you get a generous helping of scares and surprises for a B-grade film." Daniel Ruth of The Tampa Tribune expressly disliked the film, writing that director Pierce "fails to convey any real sense of terror throughout this film, only an occasional titillating bit of violence." Jeff DeBell of The Roanoke Times panned the film, faulting its screenplay and cinematography, describing it as "shoddily filmed" and "edited, evidently, with a Boy Scout ax. It doesn't frighten, and, most aggravating of all, it leaves the viewer wholly confused as to who's on whose side and why."

Joe Leydon, writing for The Times, offered a favorable assessment of the film, praising the cinematography and lead performances by Parks and Harper, though he conceded that Pierce still "has not been able to transcend his B-movie plotting and come up with a Class-A product." Bill Cosford of the Miami Herald found the film frightening, summarizing: "Eventually, it all sags—this is a B-movie, after all–but not before Pierce has set the theater screaming. He gets better all the time, and bears watching."

In a review published in the Time Out film guide, it is noted: "Pierce toiled unspectacularly in the low-budget mills for several years, but scored a bullseye with this energetically ghoulish exploiter which relocates the Old Dark House on Bonnie and Clyde terrain. The plot (city couple buy a lonely farm whose massacred former owners refuse to stay dead) may be perfunctory, but there are likeable performances, nice period details, and terrific set pieces, as well as a final twist incredible enough to be mildly surprising." TV Guide's published review, however, deemed the film "worthless exploitation junk," and "just awful."

Film critic and historian John Kenneth Muir called The Evictors a "back-to-the-basics horror film," adding that it "manages to impress, both in terms of its production values (and period detail), and visceral impact."

== Bibliography ==
- Albright, Brian (2012). Regional Horror Films, 1958–1990: A State-by-State Guide with Interviews. Jefferson, North Carolina: McFarland & Company. ISBN 9781476600420.
