= 32nd Academy Awards =

- Official poster
- Date: April 4, 1960
- Site: RKO Pantages Theatre, (Hollywood, California)
- Hosted by: Bob Hope
- Produced by: Arthur Freed
- Directed by: Alan Handley

Highlights
- Best Picture: Ben-Hur
- Most awards: Ben-Hur (11)
- Most nominations: Ben-Hur (12)

TV in the United States
- Network: NBC

The 32nd Academy Awards ceremony was held on April 4, 1960, at the RKO Pantages Theatre, to honor the films of 1959.

William Wyler's Bible epic Ben-Hur won 11 Oscars, breaking the record of nine set the previous year by Gigi. This total was later tied by Titanic in 1997 and The Lord of the Rings: The Return of the King in 2003. Wyler became the third (and most recent) person to win more than two Best Director awards (following Frank Capra and John Ford), as well as the only person to date to direct three Best Picture winners (following Mrs. Miniver in 1942 and The Best Years of Our Lives in 1946).

Most of the stars were absent as a result of an incident involving Jerry Lewis' staging of the closing number at the previous year's Oscars and of a four-week actors' strike. The studios had their final pullout of support for the Academy during the year, in a sentiment echoed by Paramount Pictures, which remarked, "why should Paramount sponsor a show that sponsors only MGM's Ben-Hur?"

A highlight of the ceremony came during the presentation of the award for Best Story and Screenplay Written Directly for the Screen: absent winner Stanley Shapiro (for Pillow Talk) had his co-winner, Maurice Richlin, ask presenter Tony Curtis to read his acceptance speech, which read, "I'm trapped downstairs in the gentleman's lounge. It seems I rented a faulty tuxedo. I'd like to thank you upstairs for this great honor." The audience roared in laughter.

== Awards ==
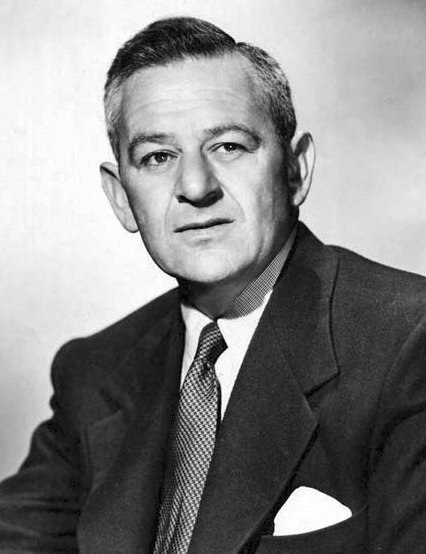
William Wyler, Best Director winner

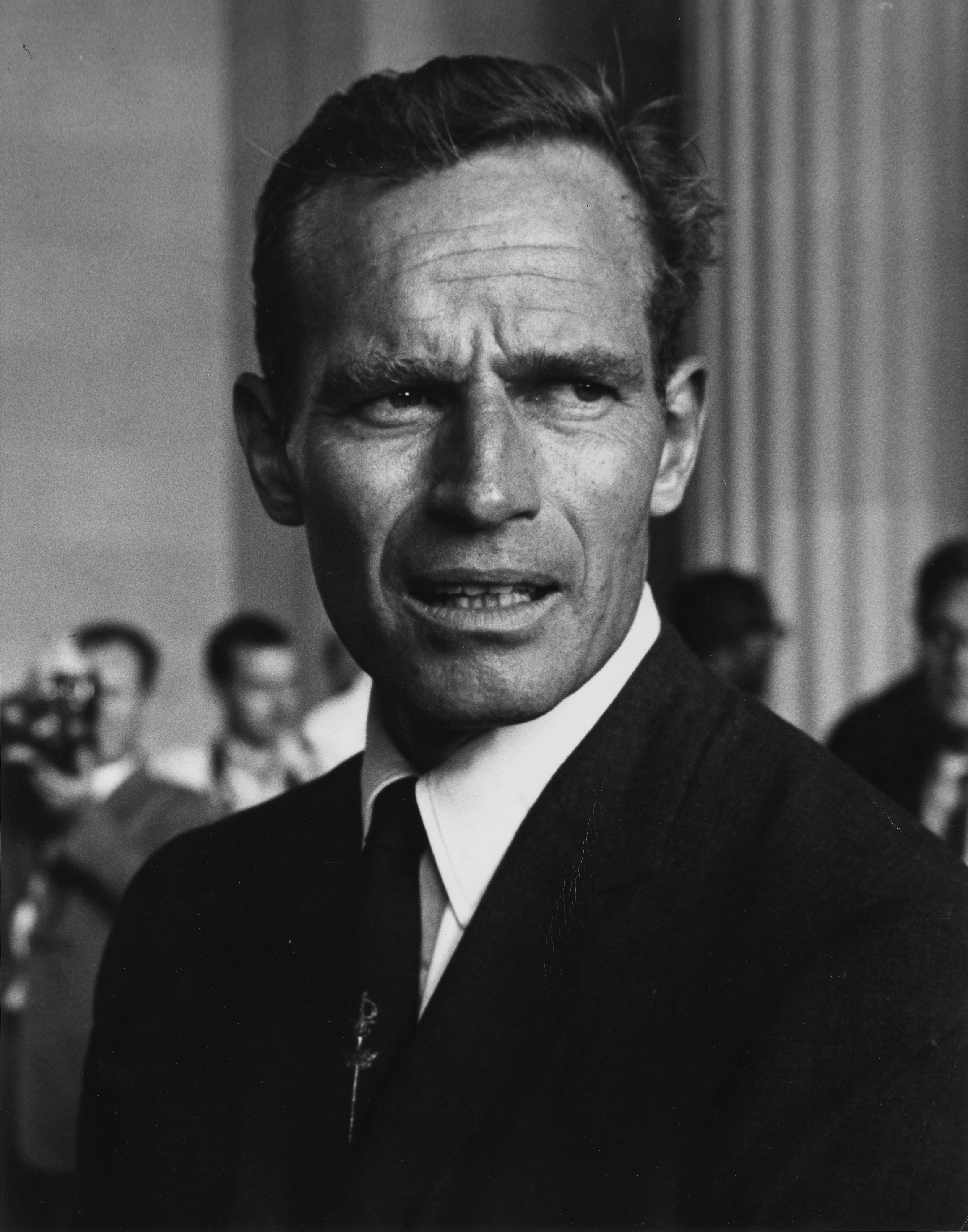
Charlton Heston, Best Actor winner

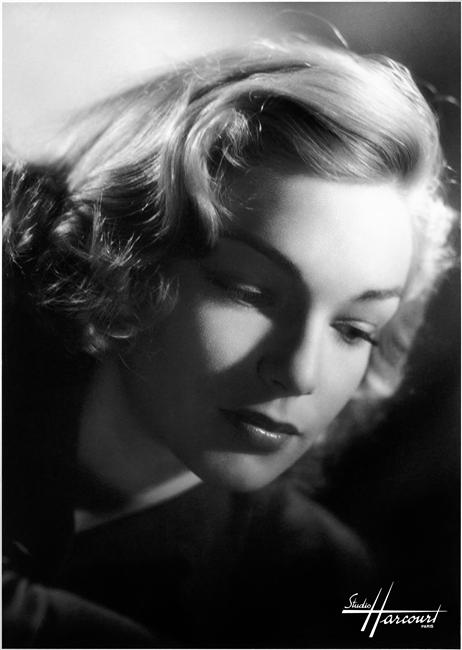
Simone Signoret, Best Actress winner

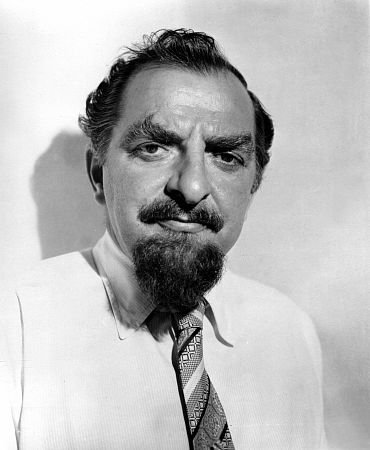
Hugh Griffith, Best Supporting Actor winner

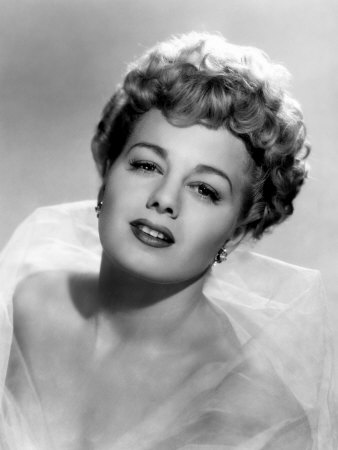
Shelley Winters, Best Supporting Actress winner

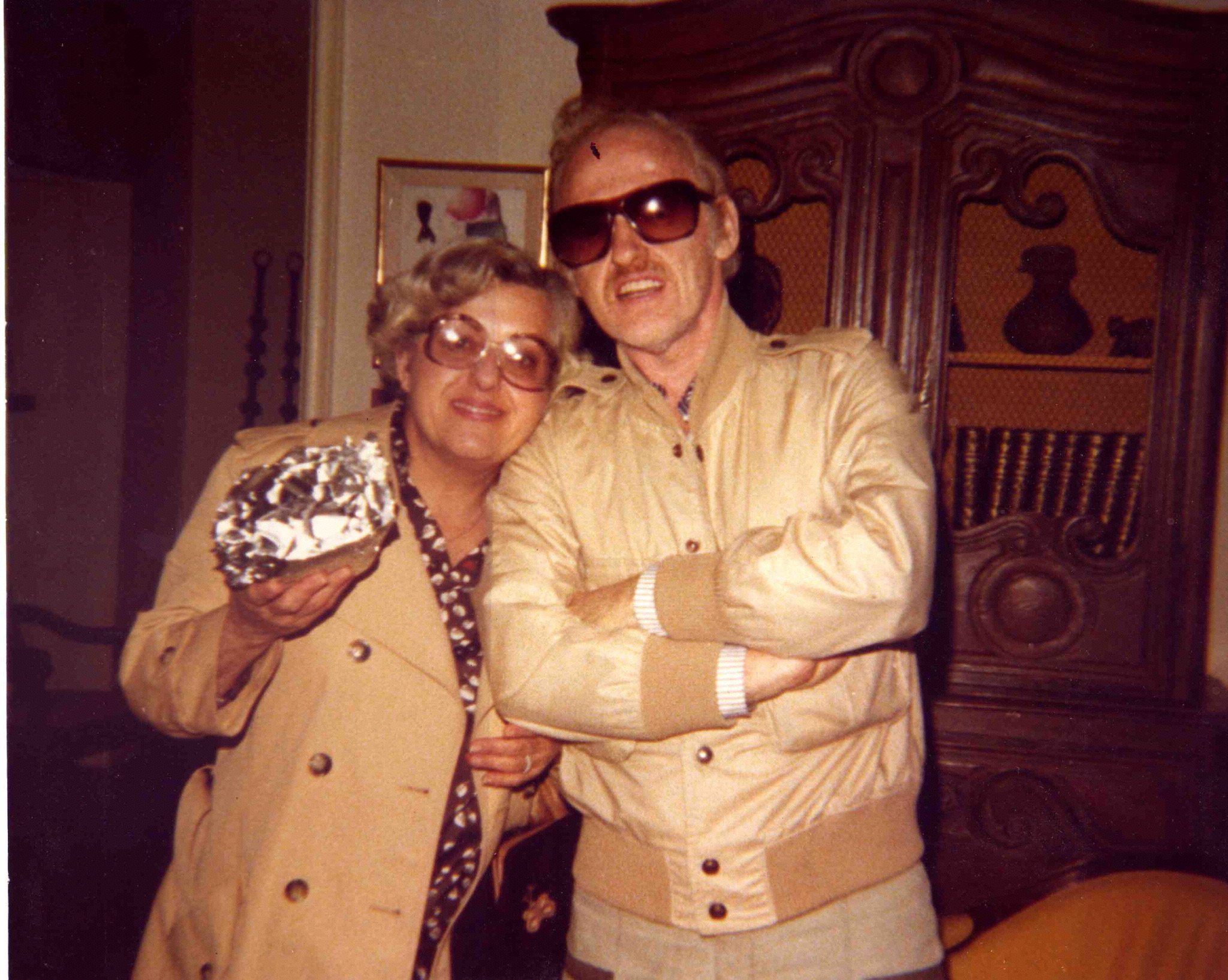
Stanley Shapiro, Best Story and Screenplay Written Directly for the Screen co-winner

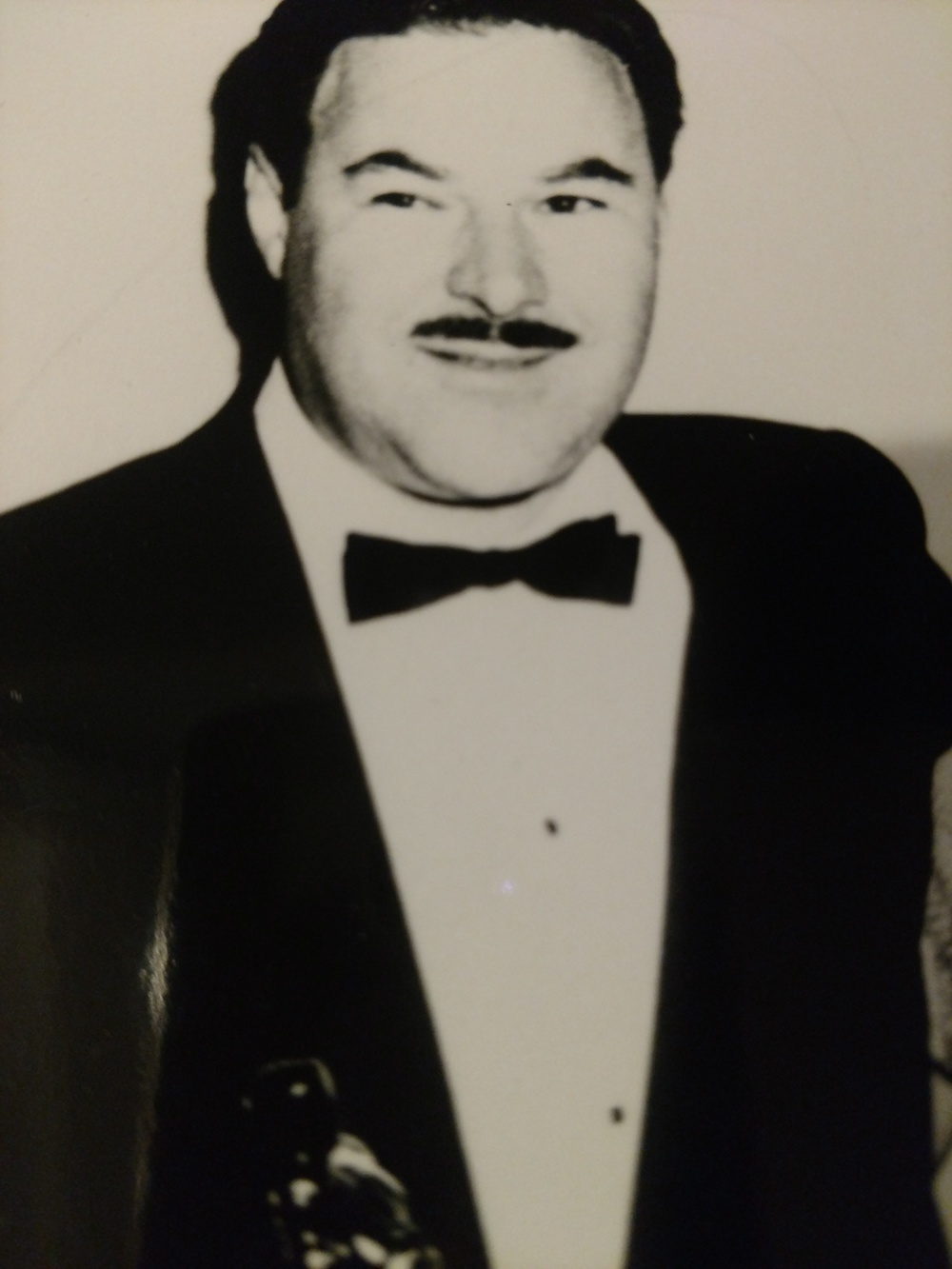
Maurice Richlin, Best Story and Screenplay Written Directly for the Screen co-winner

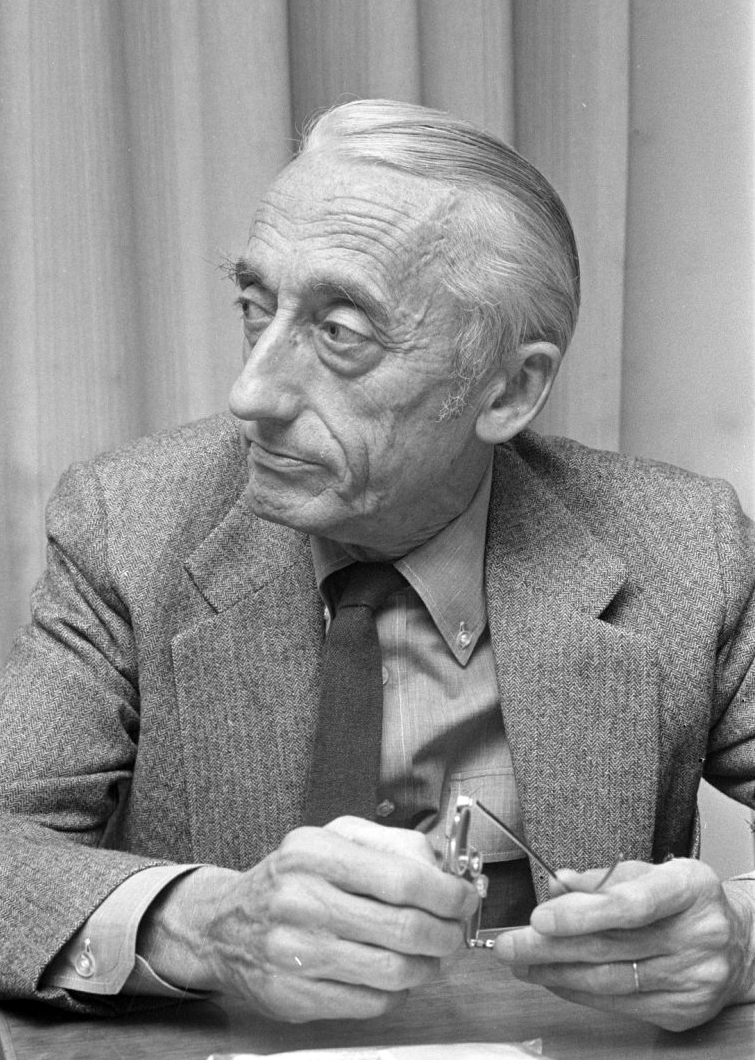
Jacques Cousteau, Best Live Action Short Film winner

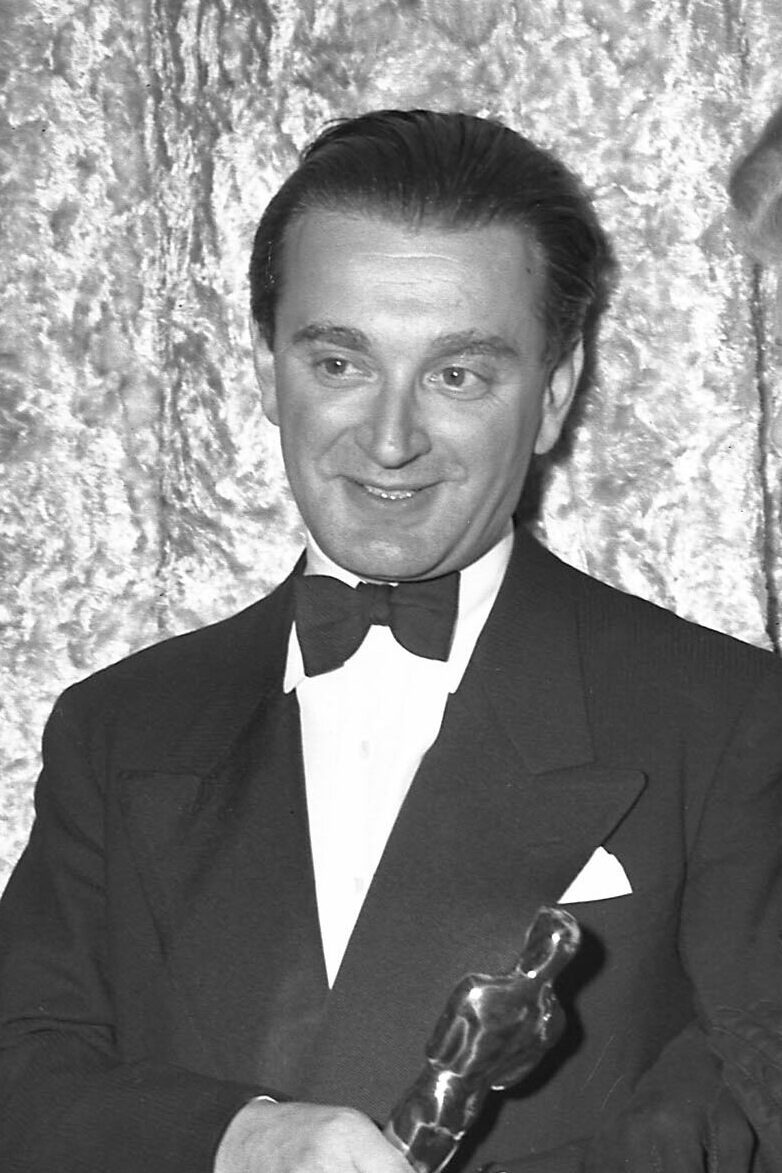
Miklós Rózsa, Best Scoring of a Dramatic or Comedy Picture winner

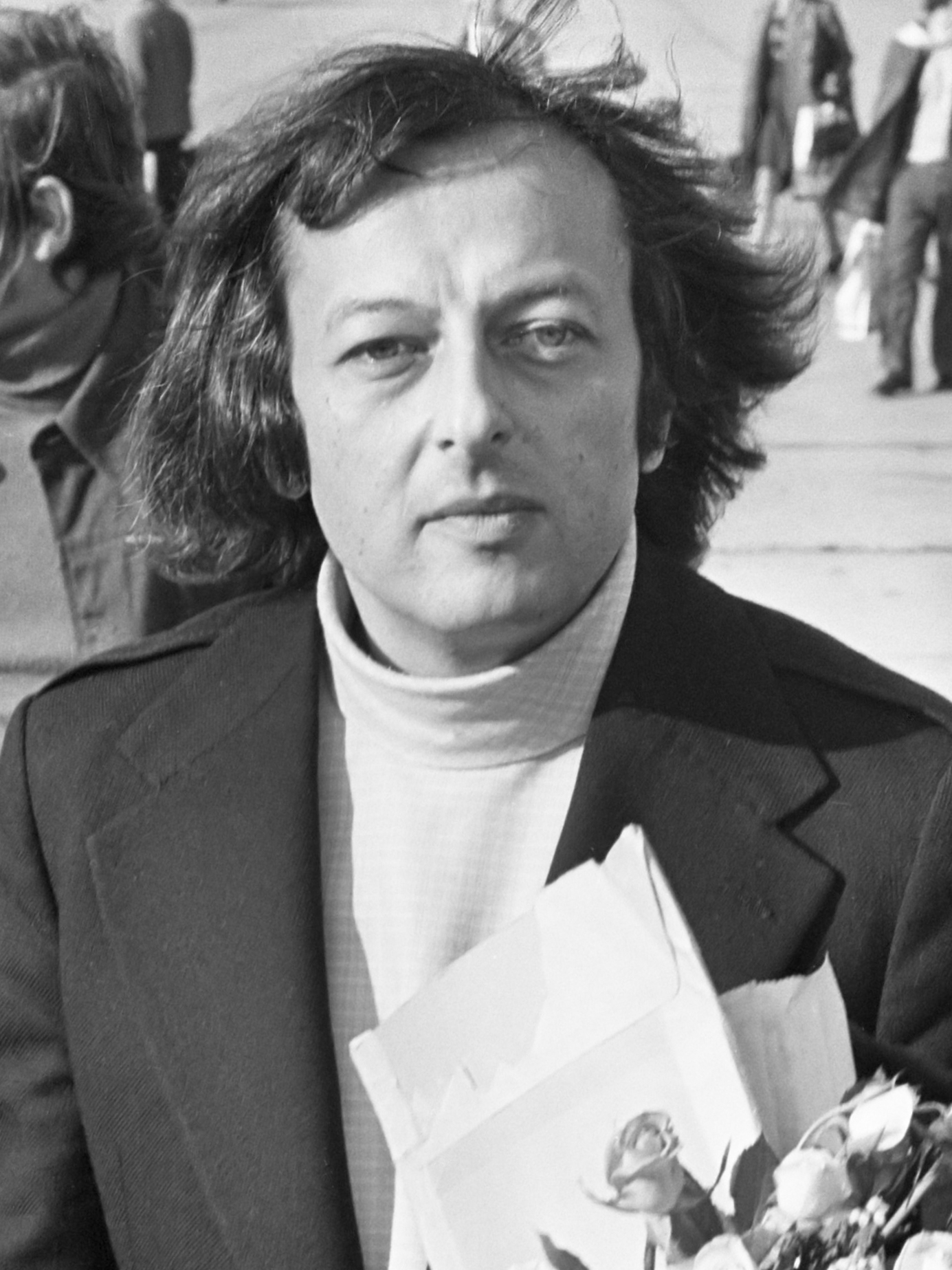
André Previn, Best Scoring of a Musical Picture co-winner

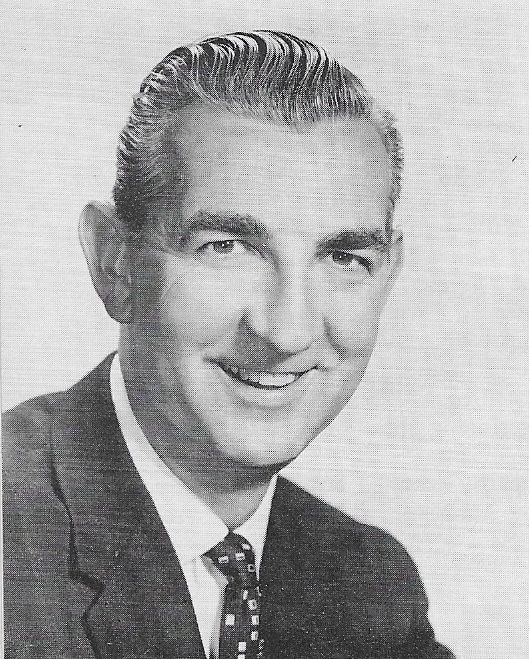
Ken Darby, Best Scoring of a Musical Picture co-winner

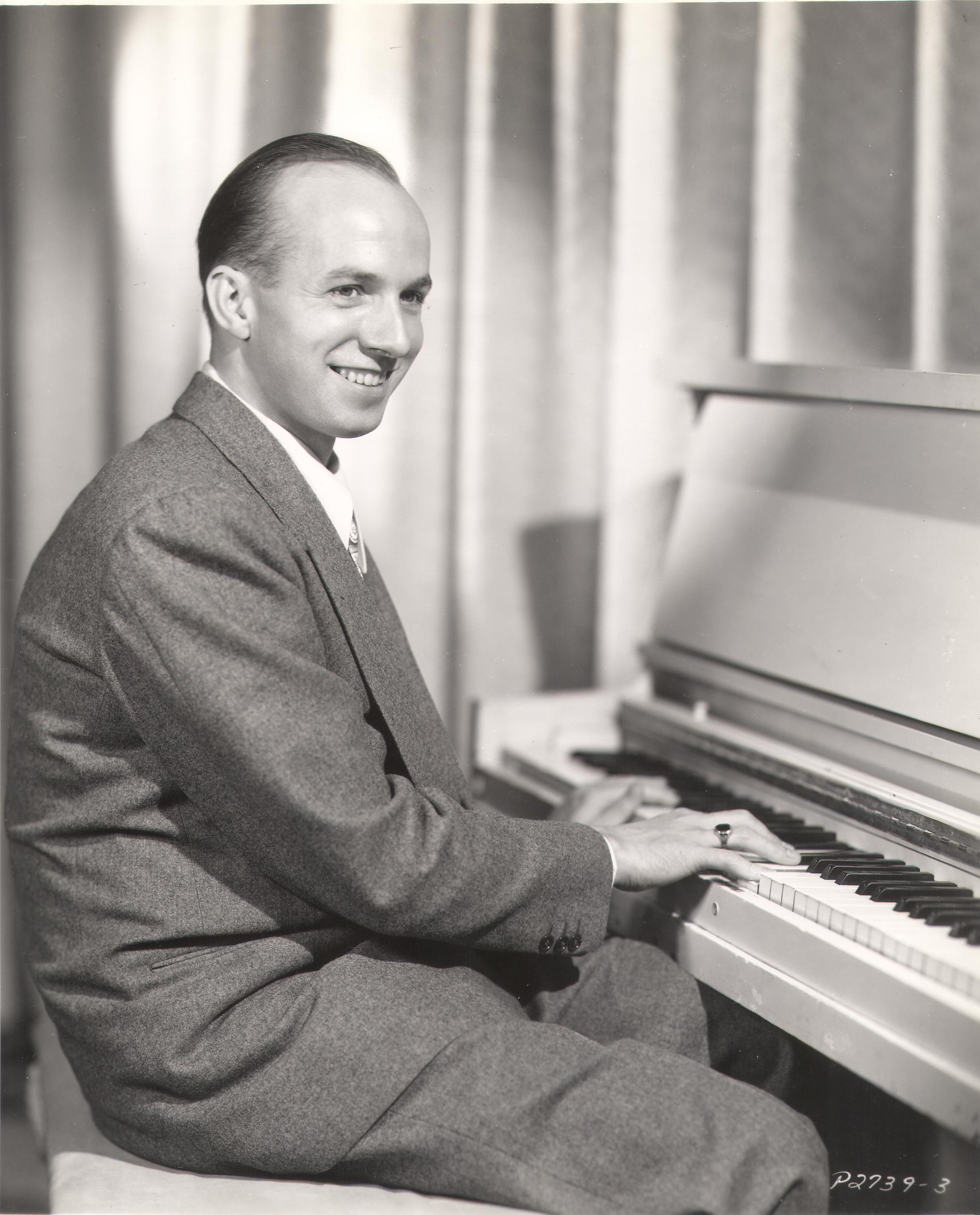
Jimmy Van Heusen, Best Song co-winner

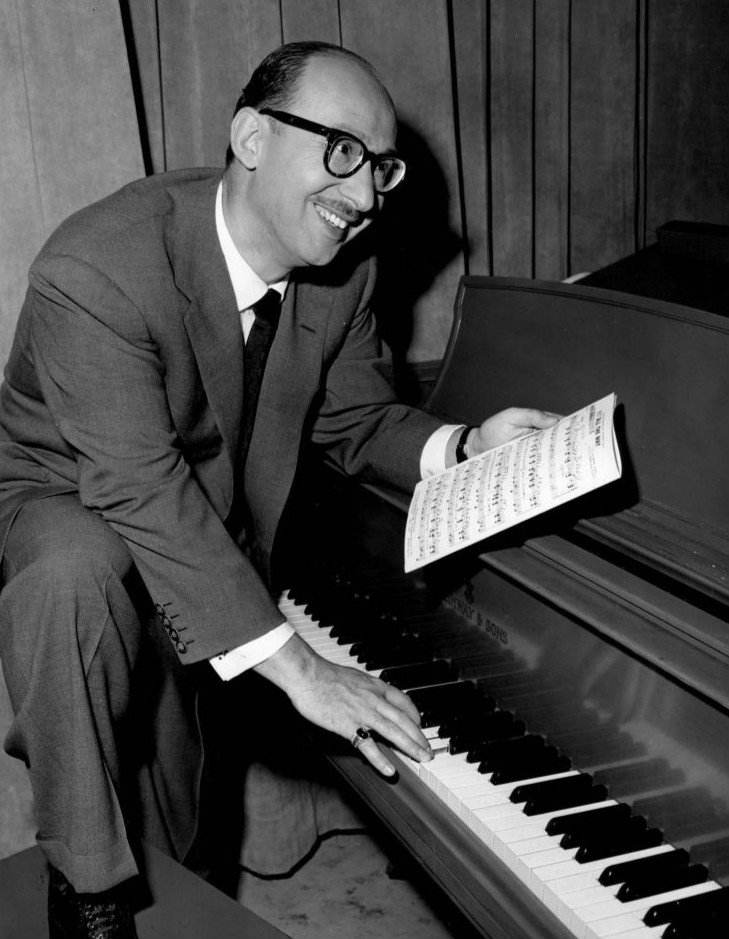
Sammy Cahn, Best Song co-winner

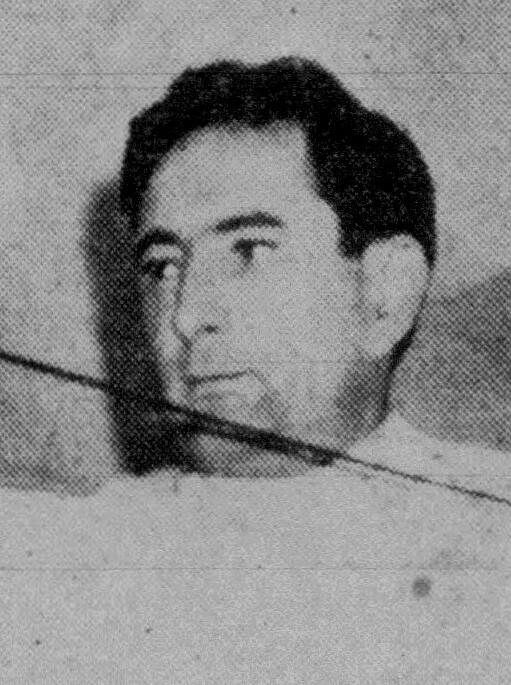
Edward Carfagno, Best Art Direction, Color co-winner

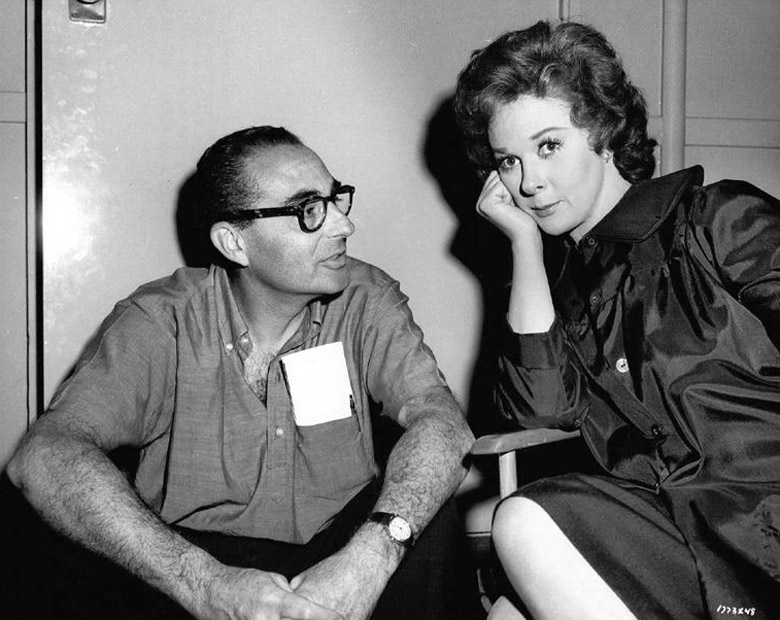
Ralph E. Winters, Best Film Editing co-winner

Nominations announced on February 22, 1960. Winners are listed first and highlighted in boldface.

| **Best Motion Picture**: **Ben-Hur – Sam Zimbalist, producer (posthumous award)**; Anatomy of a Murder – Otto Preminger, producer; The Diary of Anne Frank – George Stevens, producer; The Nun's Story – Henry Blanke, producer; Room at the Top – John Woolf and James Woolf, producers | **Best Directing**: **William Wyler – Ben-Hur**; George Stevens – The Diary of Anne Frank; Fred Zinnemann – The Nun's Story; Jack Clayton – Room at the Top; Billy Wilder – Some Like It Hot |
| **Best Actor**: **Charlton Heston – Ben-Hur as Judah Ben-Hur**; Laurence Harvey – Room at the Top as Joe Lampton; Jack Lemmon – Some Like It Hot as Jerry/"Daphne"; Paul Muni – The Last Angry Man as Dr. Sam Abelman; James Stewart – Anatomy of a Murder as Paul Biegler | **Best Actress**: **Simone Signoret – Room at the Top as Alice Aisgill**; Doris Day – Pillow Talk as Jan Morrow; Audrey Hepburn – The Nun's Story as Sister Luke; Katharine Hepburn – Suddenly, Last Summer as Violet Venable; Elizabeth Taylor – Suddenly, Last Summer as Catherine Holly |
| **Best Actor in a Supporting Role**: **Hugh Griffith – Ben-Hur as Sheik Ilderim**; Arthur O'Connell – Anatomy of a Murder as Parnell McCarthy; George C. Scott – Anatomy of a Murder as Claude Dancer; Robert Vaughn – The Young Philadelphians as Chester A. "Chet" Gwynn; Ed Wynn – The Diary of Anne Frank as Albert Dussell | **Best Actress in a Supporting Role**: **Shelley Winters – The Diary of Anne Frank as Petronella van Daan**; Hermione Baddeley – Room at the Top as Elspeth; Susan Kohner – Imitation of Life as Sarah Jane; Juanita Moore – Imitation of Life as Annie Johnson; Thelma Ritter – Pillow Talk as Alma |
| **Best Writing (Story and Screenplay -- Written Directly for the Screen)**: **Pillow Talk – Story by Russell Rouse and Clarence Greene; Screenplay by Stanley Shapiro and Maurice Richlin**; The 400 Blows – François Truffaut and Marcel Moussy; North by Northwest – Ernest Lehman; Operation Petticoat – Story by Paul King, Joseph J. Stone; Screenplay by Stanley Shapiro and Maurice Richlin; Wild Strawberries – Ingmar Bergman (Refused Nomination) | **Best Writing (Screenplay -- Based on Material from Another Medium)**: **Room at the Top – Neil Paterson based on the novel by John Braine**; Anatomy of a Murder – Wendell Mayes based on the novel by Robert Traver; Ben-Hur – Karl Tunberg based on the novel by Lew Wallace; The Nun's Story – Robert Anderson based on the novel by Kathryn Hulme; Some Like It Hot – Billy Wilder and I. A. L. Diamond based on a story by Robert Thoeren and M. Logan |
| **Best Foreign Language Film**: **Black Orpheus (France)**; The Bridge (West Germany); The Great War (Italy); Paw (Denmark); The Village on the River (Netherlands) | **Best Documentary (Feature)**: **Serengeti Shall Not Die – Bernhard Grzimek**; The Race for Space – David L. Wolper |
| **Best Documentary (Short Subject)**: **Glass – Bert Haanstra**; Donald in Mathmagic Land – Walt Disney; From Generation to Generation – Edward F. Cullen | **Best Short Subject (Live Action)**: **The Golden Fish – Jacques Cousteau**; Between the Tides – Ian Ferguson; Mysteries of the Deep – Walt Disney; The Running Jumping & Standing Still Film – Peter Sellers; Skyscraper – Shirley Clarke and Willard Van Dyke |
| **Best Short Subject (Cartoon)**: **Moonbird – John Hubley**; Mexicali Shmoes – John W. Burton; Noah's Ark – Walt Disney; The Violinist – Ernest Pintoff | **Best Music (Music Score of a Dramatic or Comedy Picture)**: **Ben-Hur – Miklós Rózsa**; The Diary of Anne Frank – Alfred Newman; The Nun's Story – Franz Waxman; On the Beach – Ernest Gold; Pillow Talk – Frank De Vol |
| **Best Music (Scoring of a Musical Picture)**: **Porgy and Bess – André Previn and Ken Darby**; The Five Pennies – Leith Stevens; Li'l Abner – Nelson Riddle and Joseph J. Lilley; Say One for Me – Lionel Newman; Sleeping Beauty – George Bruns | **Best Music (Song)**: **"High Hopes" from A Hole in the Head – Music by Jimmy Van Heusen; Lyrics by Sammy Cahn**; "The Best of Everything" from The Best of Everything – Music by Alfred Newman; Lyrics by Sammy Cahn; "The Five Pennies" from The Five Pennies – Music and Lyrics by Sylvia Fine; "The Hanging Tree" from The Hanging Tree – Music by Jerry Livingston; Lyrics by Mack David; "Strange Are The Ways of Love" from The Young Land – Music by Dimitri Tiomkin; Lyrics by Ned Washington |
| **Best Sound**: **Ben-Hur – Franklin Milton**; Journey to the Center of the Earth – Carlton W. Faulkner; Libel – A. W. Watkins; The Nun's Story – George Groves; Porgy and Bess – Gordon E. Sawyer and Fred Hynes | **Best Art Direction (Black-and-White)**: **The Diary of Anne Frank – Art Direction: Lyle R. Wheeler and George W. Davis; Set Decoration: Walter M. Scott and Stuart A. Reiss**; Career – Art Direction: Hal Pereira and Walter Tyler; Set Decoration: Samuel M. Comer and Arthur Krams; The Last Angry Man – Art Direction: Carl Anderson; Set Decoration: William Kiernan; Some Like It Hot – Art Direction: Ted Haworth; Set Decoration: Edward G. Boyle; Suddenly, Last Summer – Art Direction: Oliver Messel and William Kellner; Set Decoration: Scott Slimon |
| **Best Art Direction (Color)**: **Ben-Hur – Art Direction: William A. Horning (posthumous award) and Edward Carfagno; Set Decoration: Hugh Hunt**; The Big Fisherman – Art Direction: John DeCuir; Set Decoration: Julia Heron; Journey to the Center of the Earth – Art Direction: Lyle R. Wheeler, Franz Bachelin and Herman A. Blumenthal; Set Decoration: Walter M. Scott and Joseph Kish; North by Northwest – Art Direction: William A. Horning (posthumous nomination), Robert F. Boyle, and Merrill Pye; Set Decoration: Henry Grace and Frank R. McKelvy; Pillow Talk – Art Direction: Richard H. Riedel (posthumous nomination); Set Decoration: Russell A. Gausman and Ruby R. Levitt | **Best Cinematography (Black-and-White)**: **The Diary of Anne Frank – William C. Mellor**; Anatomy of a Murder – Sam Leavitt; Career – Joseph LaShelle; Some Like It Hot – Charles Lang; The Young Philadelphians – Harry Stradling, Sr. |
| **Best Cinematography (Color)**: **Ben-Hur – Robert Surtees**; The Big Fisherman – Lee Garmes; The Five Pennies – Daniel L. Fapp; The Nun's Story – Franz Planer; Porgy and Bess – Leon Shamroy | **Best Costume Design (Black-and-White)**: **Some Like It Hot – Orry-Kelly**; Career – Edith Head; The Diary of Anne Frank – Charles LeMaire and Mary Wills; The Gazebo – Helen Rose; The Young Philadelphians – Howard Shoup |
| **Best Costume Design (Color)**: **Ben-Hur – Elizabeth Haffenden**; The Best of Everything – Adele Palmer; The Big Fisherman – Renié; The Five Pennies – Edith Head; Porgy and Bess – Irene Sharaff | **Best Film Editing**: **Ben-Hur – Ralph E. Winters and John D. Dunning**; Anatomy of a Murder – Louis R. Loeffler; North by Northwest – George Tomasini; The Nun's Story – Walter Thompson; On the Beach – Frederic Knudtson |
**Best Special Effects**: **Ben-Hur – Visual Effects by A. Arnold Gillespie and Robert MacDonald; Audible Effects by Milo B. Lory**; Journey to the Center of the Earth – Visual Effects by L. B. Abbott and James B. Gordon; Audible Effects by Carl Faulkner

=== Honorary Awards ===
- To Lee De Forest for his pioneering inventions which brought sound to the motion picture. (Statuette)
- To Buster Keaton for his unique talents which brought immortal comedies to the screen. (Statuette)

=== Jean Hersholt Humanitarian Award ===
- Bob Hope

== Presenters and performers ==
=== Presenters ===
- Richard Conte and Angie Dickinson (Presenters: Art Direction Awards)
- Gary Cooper (Presenter: Best Motion Picture)
- Tony Curtis and Janet Leigh (Presenters: Writing Awards)
- Edward Curtiss (Presenter: Cinematography Awards)
- Arlene Dahl and Fernando Lamas (Presenters: Costume Design Awards)
- Doris Day (Presenter: Best Original Song)
- Olivia de Havilland (Presenters: Best Supporting Actor)
- Edmond O'Brien (Presenters: Best Supporting Actress)
- Mitzi Gaynor (Presenter: Documentary Awards)
- Haya Harareet (Presenter: Best Special Effects)
- Susan Hayward (Presenter: Best Actor)
- Rock Hudson (Presenter: Best Actress)
- Eric Johnston (Presenter: Best Foreign Language Film)
- B. B. Kahane (Presenter: Jean Hersholt Humanitarian Award)
- Gene Kelly (Presenter: Music Awards)
- Hope Lange and Carl Reiner (Presenters: Short Subjects Awards)
- Barbara Rush (Presenter: Best Film Editing)
- Robert Wagner and Natalie Wood (Presenters: Best Sound Recording)
- John Wayne (Presenter: Best Director)

=== Performers ===
- André Previn, conductor the Academy Awards orchestra
- Sammy Davis Jr. ("High Hopes" from A Hole in the Head)
- Gogi Grant ("Strange Are the Ways of Love" from The Young Land)
- Joni James ("The Five Pennies" from The Five Pennies)
- Frankie Laine ("The Hanging Tree" from The Hanging Tree)
- Frankie Vaughan ("The Best of Everything" from The Best of Everything)

== Multiple nominations and awards ==
Films with multiple nominations
| Nominations | Film |
|---|---|
| 12 | Ben-Hur |
| 8 | The Diary of Anne Frank |
| 8 | The Nun's Story |
| 7 | Anatomy of a Murder |
| 6 | Room at the Top |
| 6 | Some Like It Hot |
| 5 | Pillow Talk |
| 4 | The Five Pennies |
| 4 | Porgy and Bess |
| 3 | The Big Fisherman |
| 3 | Career |
| 3 | Journey to the Center of the Earth |
| 3 | North by Northwest |
| 3 | Suddenly, Last Summer |
| 3 | The Young Philadelphians |
| 2 | The Best of Everything |
| 2 | Imitation of Life |
| 2 | The Last Angry Man |
| 2 | On the Beach |

Films with multiple awards
| Awards | Film |
|---|---|
| 11 | Ben-Hur |
| 3 | The Diary of Anne Frank |
| 2 | Room at the Top |

== See also ==
- 17th Golden Globe Awards
- 1959 in film
- 2nd Grammy Awards
- 11th Primetime Emmy Awards
- 12th Primetime Emmy Awards
- 13th British Academy Film Awards
- 14th Tony Awards
