= William A. Horning =

American art director

- Born: November 9, 1904; Missouri
- Died: March 2, 1959 (aged 54); Los Angeles, California
- Occupation: Art director
- Years active: 1931-1959
- Employer: Metro-Goldwyn-Mayer (1931–1959)

William Allen Horning (November 9, 1904 – March 2, 1959) was an American art director and two-time Academy Award winner.

== Career ==
He joined Metro-Goldwyn-Mayer in 1931 as a draftsman and became an assistant to the studio's supervising art director Cedric Gibbons in 1936.

Together with Gibbons, he received his first Academy Award nomination in 1937 for Best Art Direction for Conquest. Two years later, he received another nomination for The Wizard of Oz. He waited 12 years for his next nomination for Quo Vadis.

Following Gibbons' retirement in 1956, he became the studio's supervising art director. His first Academy Award nominations without Gibbons was for Les Girls and Raintree Country in 1957.

The week before he died, Horning received another nomination for Best Art Direction for Gigi and at the 31st Academy Awards ceremony in April, he received a posthumous Academy Award.

The following year, he received two additional posthumous Oscar nominations (bringing his nominations total to eight), one for Alfred Hitchcock's North by Northwest and another for the 1959 epic film Ben-Hur. At the 32nd Academy Awards ceremony, Horning won the Academy Award for Best Art Direction for Ben-Hur, that year's Best Picture winner. Like producer Sam Zimbalist, Horning was awarded his second Oscar posthumously, as both he and Zimbalist had died while the movie was still being filmed. To date, Horning is the only person ever to win posthumous Academy Awards in consecutive ceremonies.

== Personal life ==
He was married to Esther Montgomery until his death. Together they had three sons.

== See also ==
- List of posthumous Academy Award winners and nominees
