= List of posthumous Academy Award winners and nominees =

Throughout the history of the Academy Awards, several individuals have died prior to the ceremony and were posthumously nominated or have won the award following their deaths. As of 2026, 65 individuals have received posthumous nominations with 80 nominations total, in competitive categories (with three people being nominated posthumously three times and nine people twice), 31 individuals have won posthumously (with William A. Horning winning twice, in 1959 and 1960), including 15 individuals in honorary categories. This list includes posthumous winners and nominees of the Academy's competitive awards, as well as posthumous recipients of its honorary awards.

== Competitive awards ==
Name	Date of death	Ceremony	Film year	Academy Award	Film	Result	Notes
Marit Allen	November 26, 2007	80th	2007	Best Costume Design	La Vie en Rose	Nominated	
Howard Ashman	March 14, 1991	64th	1991	Best Music (Song)	Beauty and the Beast	Won	(Note: Ashman's partner, Bill Lauch, accepted the award on his behalf. Ashman had a total of three nominations in this category in 1991, for "Belle", "Be Our Guest", and "Beauty and the Beast", which he won the award for.)
Howard Ashman	March 14, 1991	64th	1991	Best Music (Song)	Beauty and the Beast	Nominated	(Note: Ashman's partner, Bill Lauch, accepted the award on his behalf. Ashman had a total of three nominations in this category in 1991, for "Belle", "Be Our Guest", and "Beauty and the Beast", which he won the award for.)
Howard Ashman	March 14, 1991	64th	1991	Best Music (Song)	Beauty and the Beast	Nominated	(Note: Ashman's partner, Bill Lauch, accepted the award on his behalf. Ashman had a total of three nominations in this category in 1991, for "Belle", "Be Our Guest", and "Beauty and the Beast", which he won the award for.)
Howard Ashman	March 14, 1991	65th	1992	Best Music (Song)	Aladdin	Nominated	
Joseph H. August	September 25, 1947	21st	1948	Best Cinematography	Portrait of Jennie	Nominated	
Robert Alan Aurthur	November 20, 1978	52nd	1979	Best Picture	All That Jazz	Nominated	
Robert Alan Aurthur	November 20, 1978	52nd	1979	Best Original Screenplay	All That Jazz	Nominated	
Chadwick Boseman	August 28, 2020	93rd	2020	Best Actor	Ma Rainey's Black Bottom	Nominated	(Note: Boseman is the first black actor to posthumously receive a nomination.)
Mario Cecchi Gori	November 5, 1993	68th	1995	Best Picture	Il Postino	Nominated	
Frank Churchill	May 14, 1942	15th	1942	Best Music (Scoring)	Bambi	Nominated	
Frank Churchill	May 14, 1942	15th	1942	Best Music (Song)	Bambi	Nominated	
Allen Davey	March 5, 1946	18th	1945	Best Cinematography	A Song to Remember	Nominated	
James Dean	September 30, 1955	28th	1955	Best Actor	East of Eden	Nominated	
James Dean	September 30, 1955	29th	1956	Best Actor	Giant	Nominated	
Walt Disney	December 15, 1966	41st	1968	Best Short Film (Animated)	Winnie the Pooh and the Blustery Day	Won	
Gail Dolgin	October 7, 2010	84th	2011	Best Documentary (Short Subject)	The Barber of Birmingham: Foot Soldier of the Civil Rights Movement	Nominated	
Gerald Duffy	June 25, 1928	1st	1927 / 1928	Best Title Writing	The Private Life of Helen of Troy	Nominated	
Jeanne Eagels	October 3, 1929	2nd	1928 / 1929	Best Actress	The Letter	Nominated	
William Ferrari	September 10, 1962	36th	1963	Best Art Direction	How the West Was Won	Nominated	
Peter Finch	January 14, 1977	49th	1976	Best Actor	Network	Won	(Note: Finch became the first posthumous winner in an acting category. His widow Eletha and screenwriter Paddy Chayefsky accepted the award on his behalf.)
Gil Friesen	December 13, 2012	86th	2013	Best Documentary Feature	20 Feet from Stardom	Won	(Note: With Morgan Neville and Caitrin Rogers)
George Gershwin	July 11, 1937	10th	1937	Best Music (Song)	Shall We Dance	Nominated	
Stuart Gilmore	November 19, 1971	44th	1971	Best Film Editing	The Andromeda Strain	Nominated	
Thomas C. Goodwin	December 11, 1992	65th	1992	Best Documentary (Short Subject)	Educating Peter	Won	
Conrad Hall	January 4, 2003	75th	2002	Best Cinematography	Road to Perdition	Won	(Note: Conrad Hall's son Conrad W. Hall accepted the award on his behalf.)
David Hall	July 23, 1964	38th	1965	Best Art Direction	The Greatest Story Ever Told	Nominated	
Dale Hennesy	July 20, 1981	55th	1982	Best Art Direction	Annie	Nominated	
Bernard Herrmann	December 24, 1975	49th	1976	Best Music (Scoring)	Obsession	Nominated	
Bernard Herrmann	December 24, 1975	49th	1976	Best Music (Scoring)	Taxi Driver	Nominated	
Gordon Hollingshead	July 8, 1952	25th	1952	Best Short Subject (One-Reel)	Desert Killer	Nominated	
Gordon Hollingshead	July 8, 1952	25th	1952	Best Short Subject (Two-Reel)	Thar She Blows!	Nominated	
William A. Horning	March 2, 1959	31st	1958	Best Art Direction	Gigi	Won	
William A. Horning	March 2, 1959	32nd	1959	Best Art Direction	Ben-Hur	Won	
William A. Horning	March 2, 1959	32nd	1959	Best Art Direction	North by Northwest	Nominated	
Sidney Howard	August 23, 1939	12th	1939	Best Adapted Screenplay	Gone with the Wind	Won	
John Hubley	February 21, 1977	50th	1977	Best Short Film (Animated)	A Doonesbury Special	Nominated	
Eiko Ishioka	January 21, 2012	85th	2012	Best Costume Design	Mirror Mirror	Nominated	
Bert Kalmar	September 18, 1947	24th	1951	Best Music (Song)	The Strip	Nominated	
Jerome Kern	November 11, 1945	18th	1945	Best Music (Scoring)	Can't Help Singing	Nominated	
Jerome Kern	November 11, 1945	19th	1946	Best Music (Song)	Centennial Summer	Nominated	
William Kiernan	November 19, 1973	46th	1973	Best Art Direction	The Way We Were	Nominated	
Frederic Knudtson	February 14, 1964	36th	1963	Best Film Editing	It's a Mad, Mad, Mad, Mad World	Nominated	
Albert Lamorisse	June 2, 1970	51st	1978	Best Documentary (Feature)	The Lovers' Wind	Nominated	
Heath Ledger	January 22, 2008	81st	2008	Best Supporting Actor	The Dark Knight	Won	(Note: Ledger died after completing his scenes in The Dark Knight but before the film had been completed, and a year before the nominations were announced. His father, mother and sister accepted the award on his behalf.)
Boris Leven	October 11, 1986	59th	1986	Best Art Direction	The Color of Money	Nominated	
Walt Martin	July 24, 2014	87th	2014	Best Sound Mixing	American Sniper	Nominated	
William C. Mellor	April 30, 1963	38th	1965	Best Cinematography	The Greatest Story Ever Told	Nominated	
Anthony Minghella	March 18, 2008	81st	2008	Best Picture	The Reader	Nominated	
James V. Monaco	October 16, 1945	19th	1946	Best Music (Song)	The Dolly Sisters	Nominated	
Alfred Newman	February 17, 1970	43rd	1970	Best Music (Scoring)	Airport	Nominated	
Joseph O'Brien	March 30, 1945	18th	1945	Best Short Film (Live Action)	Your National Gallery	Nominated	
Bridget O'Connor	September 22, 2010	84th	2011	Best Adapted Screenplay	Tinker Tailor Soldier Spy	Nominated	
Eric Orbom	May 23, 1959	33rd	1960	Best Art Direction	Spartacus	Won	
Arnold Perl	December 11, 1971	45th	1972	Best Documentary (Feature)	Malcolm X	Nominated	
Sydney Pollack	May 26, 2008	81st	2008	Best Picture	The Reader	Nominated	
Raymond Rasch	December 23, 1964	45th	1972	Best Music (Scoring)	Limelight	Won	(Note: Limelight, a 1952 film, won its award in 1972, because the blacklisting of Charlie Chaplin prevented it from being shown in Los Angeles until then. (The Academy subsequently changed its rules to prevent films more than two years old from receiving awards.))
Gretchen Rau	March 29, 2006	79th	2006	Best Art Direction	The Good Shepherd	Nominated	
Ralph Richardson	October 10, 1983	57th	1984	Best Supporting Actor	Greystoke: The Legend of Tarzan, Lord of the Apes	Nominated	
Richard H. Riedel	March 18, 1960	32nd	1959	Best Art Direction	Pillow Talk	Nominated	
Robbie Robertson	August 9, 2023	96th	2023	Best Original Score	Killers of the Flower Moon	Nominated	
Larry Russell	February 14, 1954	45th	1972	Best Music (Scoring)	Limelight	Won	
Tess Slesinger	February 21, 1945	18th	1945	Best Adapted Screenplay	A Tree Grows in Brooklyn	Nominated	
Carol Sobieski	November 4, 1990	64th	1991	Best Adapted Screenplay	Fried Green Tomatoes	Nominated	
Adam Somner	November 27, 2024	98th	2025	Best Picture	One Battle After Another	Won	(Note: With Sara Murphy and Paul Thomas Anderson)
Gile Steele	January 16, 1952	24th	1951	Best Costume Design	Kind Lady	Nominated	
Gile Steele	January 16, 1952	24th	1951	Best Costume Design	The Great Caruso	Nominated	
Gile Steele	January 16, 1952	25th	1952	Best Costume Design	The Merry Widow	Nominated	
Harry Stradling	February 14, 1970	42nd	1969	Best Cinematography	Hello, Dolly!	Nominated	
Harry W. Tetrick	March 17, 1977	49th	1976	Best Sound	King Kong	Nominated	
Harry W. Tetrick	March 17, 1977	49th	1976	Best Sound	Rocky	Nominated	
Spencer Tracy	June 10, 1967	40th	1967	Best Actor	Guess Who's Coming to Dinner	Nominated	
Massimo Troisi	June 4, 1994	68th	1995	Best Actor	Il Postino	Nominated	
Massimo Troisi	June 4, 1994	68th	1995	Best Adapted Screenplay	Il Postino	Nominated	
Lamar Trotti	August 28, 1952	27th	1954	Best Writing	There's No Business Like Show Business	Nominated	
Geoffrey Unsworth	October 28, 1978	53rd	1980	Best Cinematography	Tess	Won	(Note: Unsworth died during the filming of Tess, and the cinematography was completed by Ghislain Cloquet. Unsworth and Cloquet were jointly nominated, successfully, for Best Cinematography.)
August Wilson	October 2, 2005	89th	2016	Best Adapted Screenplay	Fences	Nominated	
Robert L. Wolfe	February 28, 1981	54th	1981	Best Film Editing	On Golden Pond	Nominated	
Victor Young	November 10, 1956	29th	1956	Best Music (Scoring)	Around the World in 80 Days	Won	
Victor Young	November 10, 1956	29th	1956	Best Music (Song)	Written on the Wind	Nominated	
Sam Zimbalist	November 4, 1958	32nd	1959	Best Picture	Ben-Hur	Won	(Note: Zimbalist died during the filming of Ben-Hur. His widow Mary Zimbalist accepted the award on his behalf.)

== Honorary awards ==
Name	Date of death	Ceremony	Film year	Academy Award	Notes
Robert Benjamin	October 22, 1979	52nd	1979	Jean Hersholt Humanitarian Award	
Les Bowie	January 27, 1979	51st	1978	Special Achievement Award (Visual Effects) for Superman	
Theo Brown	April 30, 2002	82nd	2009	Scientific and Technical Award (Scientific and Engineering Award)	
Douglas Fairbanks	December 12, 1939	12th	1939	Academy Honorary Award	
Chuck Gaspar	January 15, 2009	86th	2013	Scientific or Technical Award (Technical Achievement Award)	
Audrey Hepburn	January 20, 1993	65th	1992	Jean Hersholt Humanitarian Award	(Note: Hepburn died eight days after the Academy voted to confer this award, but two months before the 65th Academy Awards ceremony. Her son Sean Hepburn Ferrer accepted the award on her behalf.)
Werner Hopf	November 28, 1953	32nd	1959	Scientific and Technical Award (Class II)	
Quincy Jones	November 3, 2024	97th	2024	Academy Honorary Award	(Note: Jones died four months after the Academy voted to confer this award, but two weeks before the Governors Awards ceremony on November 17.)
George Kraemer	January 18, 1993	65th	1992	Scientific and Technical Award (Scientific and Engineering Award)	
John D. Lowry	January 21, 2012	84th	2011	Scientific and Technical Award (Scientific and Engineering Award)	
Charles Miller	N/A	13th	1940	Scientific or Technical Award (Class I)	
Jürgen Noffke	November 7, 2011	84th	2011	Scientific and Technical Award (Scientific and Engineering Award)	
Edward G. Robinson	January 26, 1973	45th	1972	Academy Honorary Award	(Note: Robinson died after the Academy voted to confer this award, but two months before the 45th Academy Awards ceremony. His widow Jane accepted the award on his behalf.)
Louis Stankiewicz	N/A	54th	1981	Scientific or Technical Award (Technical Achievement Award)	
Geoffrey H. Williamson	January 20, 1993	65th	1992	Scientific and Technical Award (Scientific and Engineering Award)	

== Excluded: retrospective awards ==
The list does not include people who were retrospectively honored with an Academy Award and were dead at the time the Academy made the decision to make the retrospective award. For example: in 1993, seventeen years after his death, Dalton Trumbo was retrospectively awarded the 1953 Oscar for Academy Award for Best Story for Roman Holiday. It had been previously awarded to Ian McLellan Hunter. However, Hunter was nominated in place of Trumbo, because Trumbo was on the Hollywood blacklist at the time and it was impossible for his name to appear in either the film's credits or the Academy Award nomination (though it was not generally known that he was the real screenwriter). Trumbo did not die until 1976, and under normal circumstances he would have received this award in person in 1953; therefore the Academy does not consider this a posthumous award but a correction of the record.

Similarly, the Oscar for Best Screenplay (Adaptation) for The Bridge on the River Kwai was originally awarded to Pierre Boulle, but only in 1984, was corrected to honor the actual screenwriters, Carl Foreman and Michael Wilson, who were blacklisted at the time and could only work on the film in secret. By the time this correction was made, both Foreman and Wilson had died, but the award does not qualify for an entry in the above list.
