= Claude Heater =

American opera singer (1927–2020)

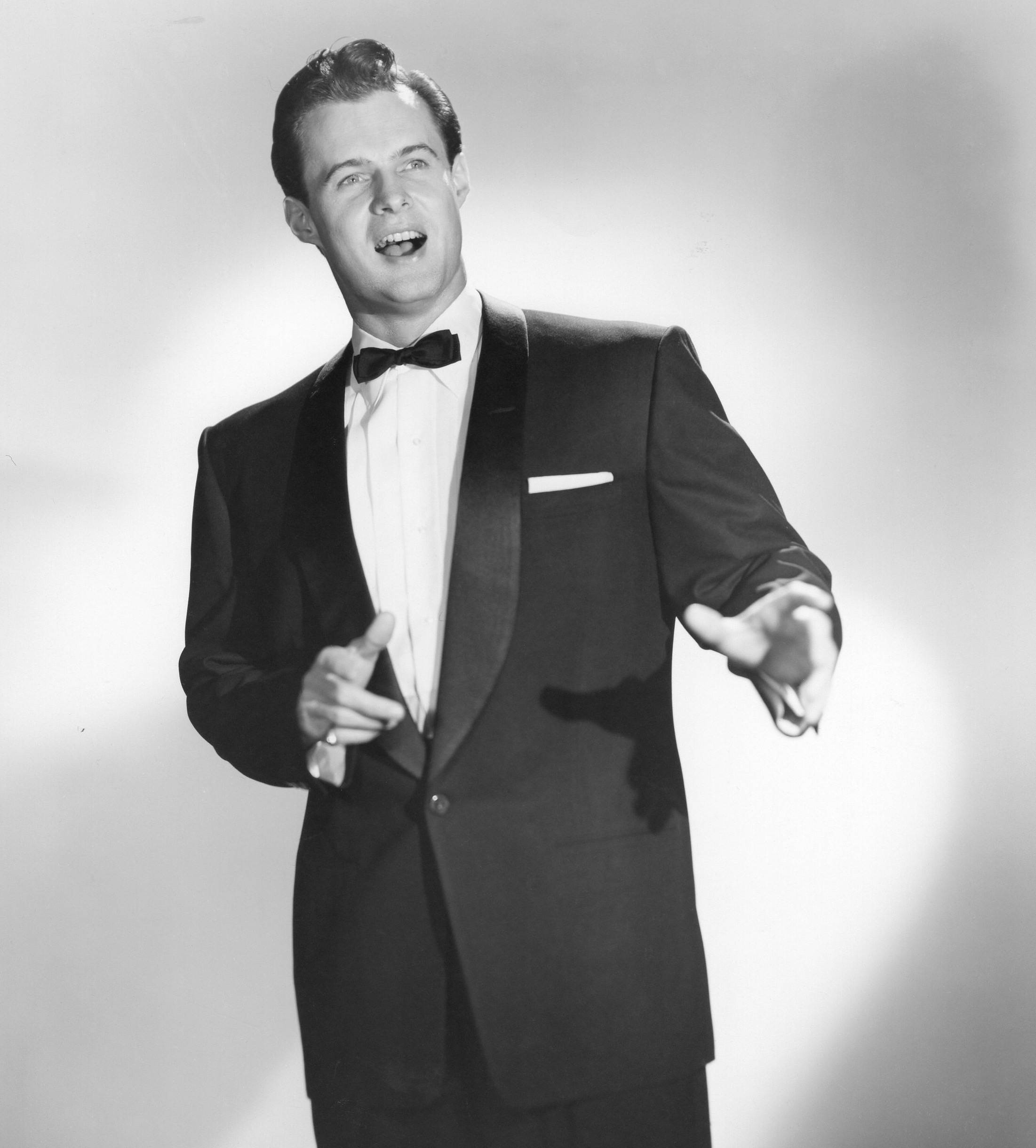
- Born: October 25, 1927; Oakland, California, US
- Died: May 28, 2020 (aged 92); San Francisco, California, US
- Occupation: Opera singer
- Known for: Role of Jesus in Ben-Hur

Claude Heater (October 25, 1927 – May 28, 2020) was an American opera singer. He is also known for portraying the role of Jesus Christ (uncredited in the titles) in the 1959 classic film Ben-Hur in which he is primarily shown from the back.

== Biography ==
Born in Oakland, California, Heater grew up in a family who were members of the Church of Jesus Christ of Latter-day Saints (LDS Church). When Heater was nineteen years old, he served as a missionary of the LDS Church in the Eastern United States. He began his career on Broadway as a baritone in New York City in 1950. In 1952, he decided to focus on opera and left to study as a baritone in Italy. This led to a tour of Spain with an Italian opera company and eventually with opera houses in Europe ending his baritone career after three years at the Vienna State Opera and the San Francisco Opera in California from 1953 to 1961. He returned to Europe in 1956 to sing in Basel, Switzerland, with Montserrat Caballé in Tosca, Pagliacci and Tiefland, along with Un ballo in maschera, La bohème, and Lohengrin. He went from Basel to Berlin to alternate with Dietrich Fischer-Dieskau in Un ballo in maschera and Don Carlos and with Hermann Prey in other roles. His debut was as Escamillo in Carmen.

Heater retrained his voice as a tenor, and from 1963 had great success in the Dramatic/Wagnerian tenor repertoire at major theatres internationally. After retiring from the stage in the 1970s, he devoted his time to develop dramatic voices.

Heater as Scarpia with Montserrat Caballé as Tosca in Basel in 1956.

Heater died on May 28, 2020, in San Francisco, California, aged 92 due to cardiovascular disease.

== Filmography ==
- Ben Hur (1959) - Jesus Christ (film debut, uncredited)
- Tristan und Isolde (1970) - Tristan (final film)
