= Ben-Hur (1959 film) =

1959 film by William Wyler

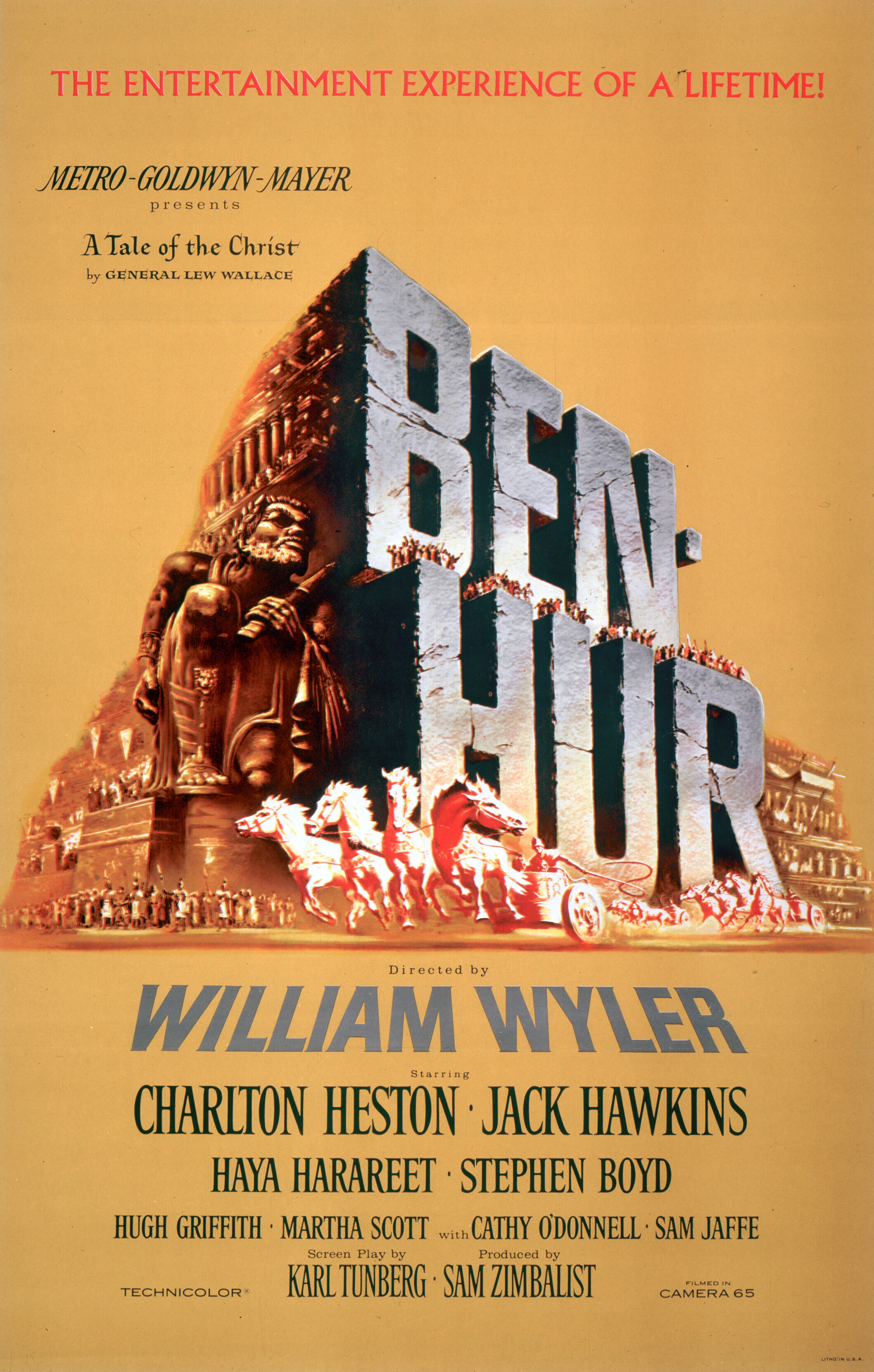
- Theatrical release poster by Reynold Brown
- Directed by: William Wyler
- Screenplay by: Karl Tunberg (Note: Although Tunberg received sole credit for the screenplay, Maxwell Anderson, S. N. Behrman, Gore Vidal and Christopher Fry worked on the script in the course of development. See the Writing section for more details.)
- Based on: Ben-Hur: A Tale of the Christ by Lew Wallace
- Produced by: Sam Zimbalist
- Starring: Charlton Heston; Jack Hawkins; Haya Harareet; Stephen Boyd; Hugh Griffith; Martha Scott; Cathy O'Donnell; Sam Jaffe
- Cinematography: Robert L. Surtees
- Edited by: John D. Dunning; Ralph E. Winters
- Music by: Miklós Rózsa
- Production company: Metro-Goldwyn-Mayer
- Distributed by: Loew's, Inc.
- Release date: November 18, 1959
- Running time: 212 minutes (excluding overture, intermission, and entr'acte)
- Country: United States
- Language: English
- Budget: $15.2 million
- Box office: $146.9 million (initial release)

Ben-Hur (/bɛnˈhɜːr/) is a 1959 American religious epic film directed by William Wyler, produced by Sam Zimbalist, and starring Charlton Heston as the title character. A remake of the 1925 silent film with a similar title, it was adapted from Lew Wallace's 1880 novel Ben-Hur: A Tale of the Christ. The screenplay is credited to Karl Tunberg, but includes contributions from Maxwell Anderson, S. N. Behrman, Gore Vidal, and Christopher Fry. The cast also features Stephen Boyd, Jack Hawkins, Haya Harareet, Hugh Griffith, Martha Scott, Cathy O'Donnell and Sam Jaffe.

Ben-Hur had the largest budget ($15.175 million), as well as the largest sets built, of any film produced at the time. Costume designer Elizabeth Haffenden oversaw a staff of 100 wardrobe fabricators to make the costumes, and a workshop employing 200 artists and workmen provided the hundreds of friezes and statues needed in the film. Filming commenced on May 18, 1958, and wrapped on January 7, 1959, with shooting lasting for 12 to 14 hours a day and six days a week. Pre-production began in Italy at Cinecittà around October 1957, and post-production took six months. Under cinematographer Robert L. Surtees, executives at Metro-Goldwyn-Mayer made the decision to produce the film in a widescreen format. Over 200 camels and 2,500 horses were used in the shooting of the film, with some 10,000 extras. The sea battle was filmed using miniatures in a huge tank on the back lot at the Metro-Goldwyn-Mayer Studios in Culver City, California. The nine-minute chariot race has become one of cinema's most famous action sequences, and the score, composed and conducted by Miklós Rózsa, was at the time the longest ever composed for a film, and was highly influential on cinema for over 15 years.

Following a $14.7 million marketing effort, Ben-Hur premiered at Loew's State Theatre in New York City on November 18, 1959. It was the fastest-grossing as well as the highest-grossing film of 1959, becoming the second highest-grossing film in history at the time, after Gone with the Wind. It won a record eleven Academy Awards, including Best Picture, Best Director (Wyler), Best Actor in a Leading Role (Heston), Best Actor in a Supporting Role (Griffith), and Best Cinematography – Color (Surtees); it also won Golden Globe Awards for Best Motion Picture – Drama, Best Director, and Best Supporting Actor – Motion Picture for Stephen Boyd. In 1998, the American Film Institute named it the 72nd best American film and the second best American epic film in the AFI's 10 Top 10. In 2004, the National Film Preservation Board selected Ben-Hur for preservation in the National Film Registry of the Library of Congress for being "culturally, historically, or aesthetically significant".

== Plot ==
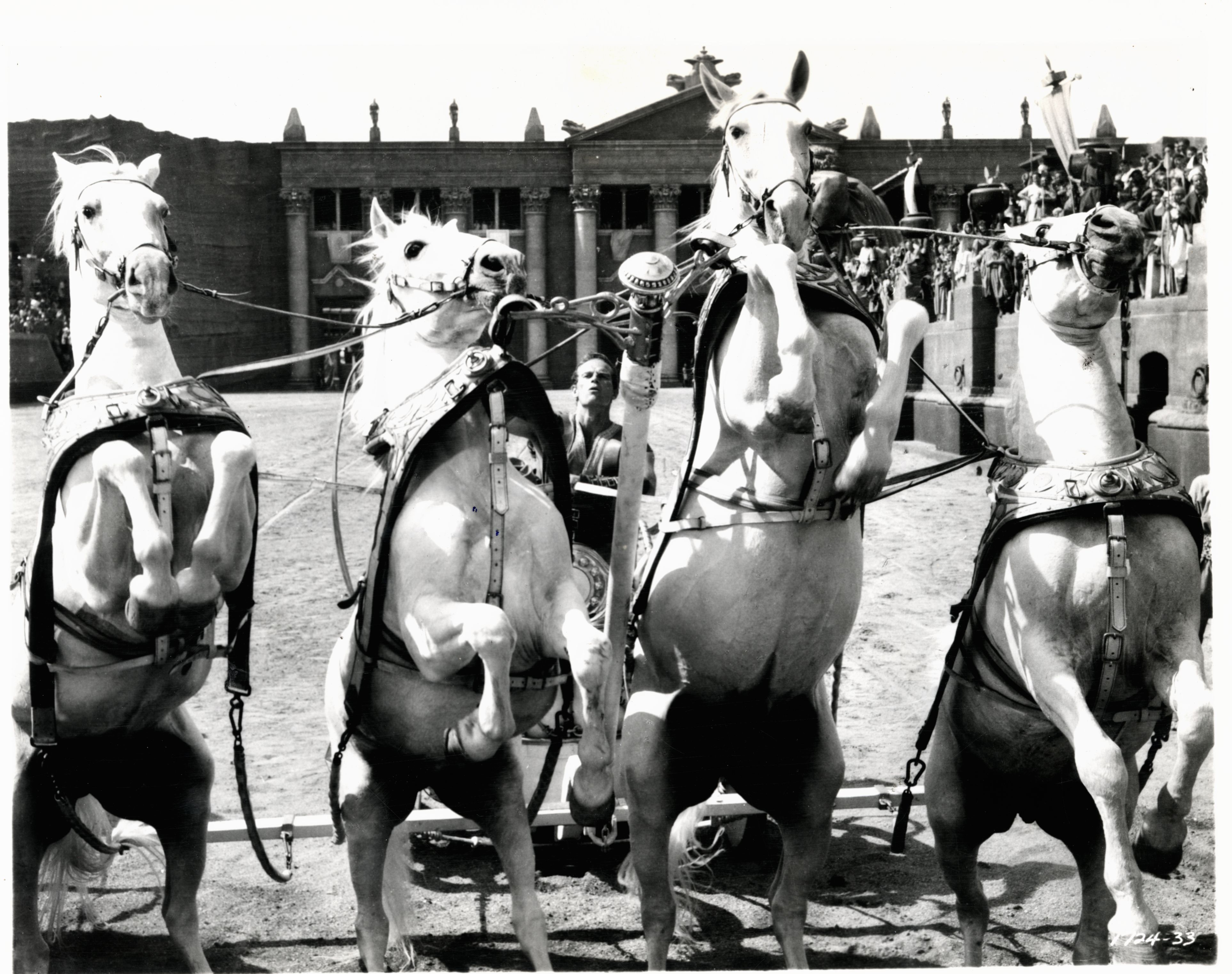
A scene from the film.

The Three Wise Men, including Balthasar, visit Bethlehem to worship the infant Jesus. Years later, in AD 26 (Note: The film opens in 1 BC, with a significant prologue recounting the Nativity of Jesus, before its main title card, emphasizing the "A Tale of the Christ" subtext.) Jerusalem, Judah Ben-Hur, a wealthy Jewish prince, lives with his mother Miriam and younger sister Tirzah. The family's steward, Simonides, has a daughter named Esther who was born a slave and whom Judah has not seen since they were children. As their master, Judah (who shows affection for Esther) allows her to marry a freeman and emancipates her as a wedding gift.

Judah's Roman childhood friend, Messala, returns to Jerusalem as tribune and second-in-command to the new Roman governor of Judea, Valerius Gratus. He fully embraces Rome's glory and imperial power while Judah remains devoted to his faith and to the Jewish people's freedom. Messala demands that Judah denounce potential Jewish rebels to him. Judah refuses, and they part as enemies. Later, Gratus's horse is spooked by loose roof tiles tumbling off Judah's house; Messala uses this innocuous incident to condemn Judah to the galleys, imprison Miriam and Tirzah, and arrest Simonides. Judah, marched with other prisoners through Nazareth, has a brief chance encounter with Jesus Christ, who gives him water.

Imprisoned, Judah rows on Roman Consul Quintus Arrius's flagship. During a battle, Arrius's ship sinks, and Judah rescues Arrius. Despite the sinking, Arrius is victorious; in Rome, Emperor Tiberius gives Judah to Arrius as his slave. Judah becomes a champion charioteer and Arrius adopts him as his son.

Judah travels home. En route, he meets the chariot-loving Arab Sheik Ilderim. In Jerusalem, Judah finds Esther (who never married) living in Judah's abandoned house. Wielding his status as Arrius's adopted son, Judah confronts Messala and demands Miriam and Tirzah's freedom. They are located in a jail, alive but as lepers, and are thus swiftly expelled from the city. Before departing, Miriam and Tirzah seek out Esther and beg her to never tell Judah their true fate. Esther tells Judah they are dead, enraging Judah.

Judah partners with Sheik Ilderim in a chariot race, hoping to defeat Messala. Messala, in a long race setpiece, drives a "Greek" chariot that wrecks several rivals' chariots; when he attempts to wreck Judah's chariot, Messala falls from his chariot and is gruesomely trampled. Judah wins the race. Before dying, Messala spitefully tells Judah his mother and sister are alive and are in the Valley of the Lepers.

After refusing to accompany Esther to hear Jesus Christ speak on a hillside, Judah meets with the new governor, Pontius Pilate, who tells him he has been made a citizen of Rome. Judah rejects Roman citizenship and renounces the Arrius name. Pilate, fearing Judah's influence, pressures Judah to leave Judea.

Judah and Esther remove Miriam and a dying Tirzah from the Valley of the Lepers and seek out Jesus Christ just as the trial of Jesus has begun. While carrying his cross through the streets, Jesus collapses. Judah, realizing Jesus is the man who gave him water in Nazareth, tries to approach but is stopped by a Roman soldier.

Judah and Balthasar witness Jesus's crucifixion. Miriam and Tirzah hide in a cave with Esther as a violent storm descends; when it lifts, their leprosy vanishes. Realizing from Jesus's example that forgiveness is better than revenge, Judah returns to his house and finds them there. Embracing, the four rejoice at the miracle.

== Cast ==
- Charlton Heston as Judah Ben-Hur
- Jack Hawkins as Quintus Arrius
- Haya Harareet as Esther
- Stephen Boyd as Messala
- Hugh Griffith as Sheik Ilderim
- Martha Scott as Miriam
- Cathy O'Donnell as Tirzah
- Sam Jaffe as Simonides
- Finlay Currie as Balthasar
- Frank Thring as Pontius Pilate
- Terence Longdon as Drusus
- George Relph as Tiberius Caesar
- André Morell as Sextus
- All the above appear in the opening credits, the rest are uncredited.
- Laurence Payne as Joseph
- Marina Berti as Flavia
- Richard Hale as Gaspar
- David Davies as Quaestor
- Ady Berber as Malluch
- Mino Doro as Valerius Gratus
- Duncan Lamont as Marius
- Howard Lang as Hortator
- Robert Brown as Galley Overseer
- Lando Buzzanca as Prisoner
- Giuliano Gemma as Centurion
- John Le Mesurier as Physician
- Claude Heater as Jesus Christ
- José Greci as Mary, mother of Jesus

== Production ==
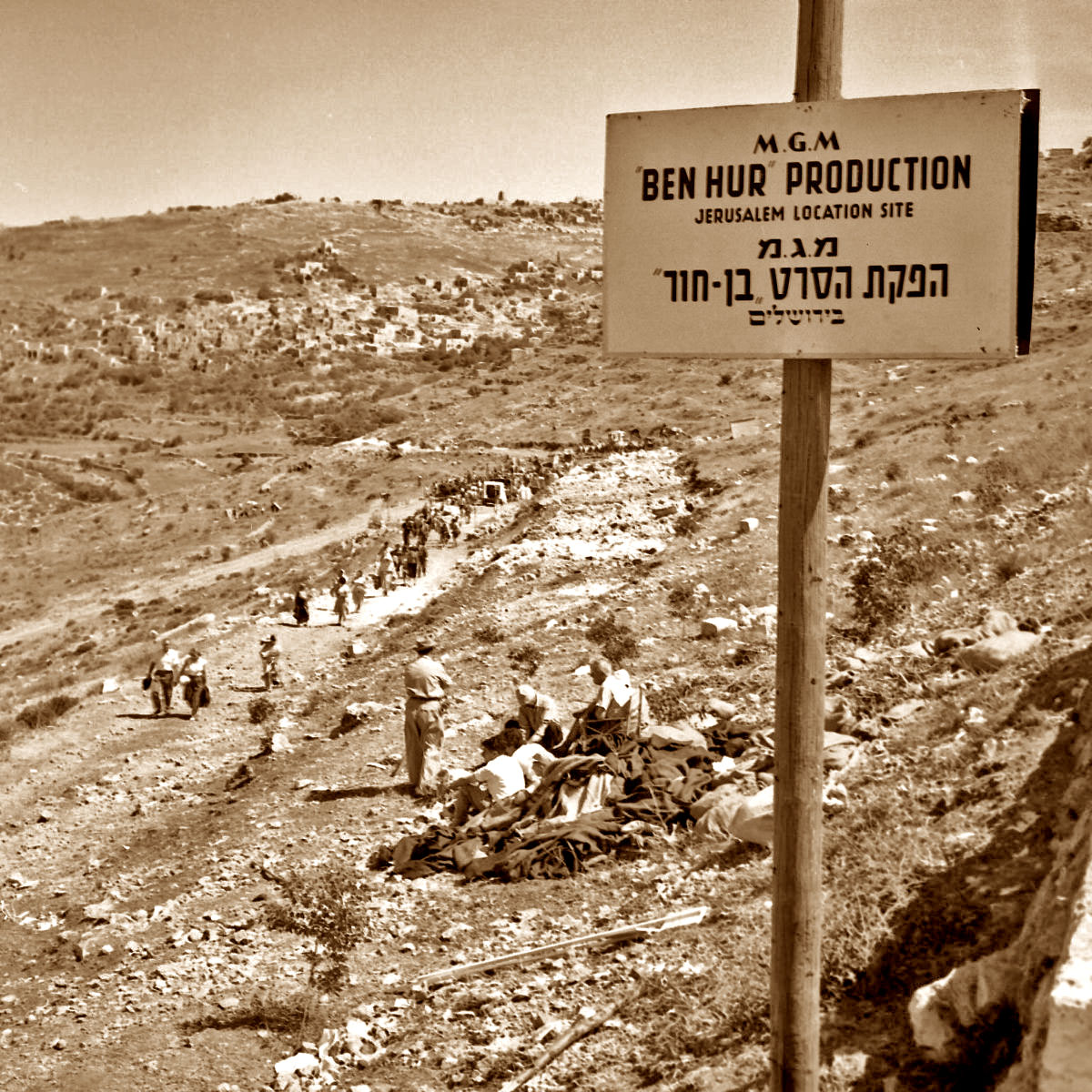
Ben-Hur filming site near Lifta, intended to represent Jerusalem

Metro-Goldwyn-Mayer (MGM) originally announced a remake of the 1925 silent film Ben-Hur in December 1952, ostensibly as a way to spend its Italian assets. (Note: MGM had extensive amounts of income in Italian lira. In the wake of World War II the Italian government banned the movement of lira out of Italy as a means of stabilizing the inflation-plagued Italian economy. Finding a way to spend this money in Italy would free up resources elsewhere for the studio.) Stewart Granger and Robert Taylor were reported to be in the running for the lead. Nine months later, MGM announced it would make the film in CinemaScope, with shooting beginning in 1954. In November 1953, MGM announced it had assigned producer Sam Zimbalist to the picture and hired screenwriter Karl Tunberg to write it. Sidney Franklin was scheduled to direct, with Marlon Brando intended for the lead. In September 1955, Zimbalist, who continued to claim that Tunberg's script was complete, announced that a $7 million, six- to seven-month production would begin in April 1956 in either Israel or Egypt in MGM's new 65mm widescreen process, MGM Camera 65. MGM, however, suspended production in early 1956, following Franklin's resignation.

By the late 1950s, the consent decree of 1948 forcing film studios to divest themselves of theater chains and the competitive pressure of television had caused significant financial distress at MGM. In a gamble to save the studio, and inspired by the success of Paramount Pictures' 1956 Biblical epic The Ten Commandments, studio head Joseph Vogel announced in 1957 that MGM would again move forward on a remake of Ben-Hur. Filming started in May 1958 and wrapped in January 1959, and post-production took six months. Although the budget for Ben-Hur was initially $7 million, it was reported to be $10 million by February 1958, reaching $15.175 million by the time shooting began—making it the costliest film ever produced up to that time. When adjusted for inflation, the budget of Ben Hur was approximately $168 million in constant dollars.

One notable change in the film involved the opening titles. Concerned that a roaring Leo the Lion (the MGM mascot) would create the wrong mood for the sensitive and sacred nativity scene, Wyler received permission to replace the traditional logo with one in which Leo the Lion is quiet.

=== Development ===
Lew Wallace's 1880 novel, Ben-Hur: A Tale of the Christ, ran to about 550 pages. Zimbalist hired a number of screenwriters to cut the story down and turn the novel into a script. According to Gore Vidal, more than 12 versions of the script had been written by various writers by the spring of 1958. Vidal himself had been asked to write a version of the script in 1957, refused, and been placed on suspension for his decision. According to Vidal, Karl Tunberg was one of the last writers to work on the script. Other sources place Tunberg's initial involvement much earlier. Tunberg cut out everything in the book after the crucifixion of Jesus, omitted the sub-plot in which Ben-Hur fakes his death and raises a Jewish army to overthrow the Romans, and altered the manner in which the leperous women are healed. (Note: Instead of being healed as Christ carries His cross, the women are healed after accidentally soaking in rainwater stained by the blood of Jesus after the crucifixion.) According to Wyler, Vidal, their biographers (see bibliography below) and the sources that follow them, Zimbalist was unhappy with Tunberg's script, considering it to be "pedestrian" and "unshootable".

The writing effort changed direction when director Sidney Franklin fell ill and was removed from the production. Zimbalist offered the project to William Wyler, who had been one of 30 assistant directors on the 1925 film, in early 1957. Wyler initially rejected it, considering the quality of the script to be "very primitive, elementary" and no better than hack work. Zimbalist showed Wyler some preliminary storyboards for the chariot race and informed him that MGM would be willing to spend up to $10 million, and as a result, Wyler began to express an interest in the picture. MGM permitted Wyler to start casting, and in April 1957, mainstream media outlets reported that Wyler was giving screen tests to Italian leading men, such as Cesare Danova.

Wyler did not formally agree to direct the film until September 1957, and MGM did not announce his hiring until January 3, 1958. Even though he still lacked a leading man, Wyler took the assignment for many reasons: He was promised a base salary of $350,000 as well as 8 percent of the gross box office (or 3 percent of the net profits, whichever was greater), and he wanted to work in Rome again (in Hollywood on the Tiber, where he had filmed Roman Holiday). His base salary was, at the time, the largest ever paid to a director for a single film. Professional competitive reasons also played a role in his decision to direct, and Wyler later admitted that he wished to outdo Cecil B. DeMille, and make a "thinking man's" Biblical epic. In later years, William Wyler would joke that it took a Jew to make a good film about Christ.

=== Writing ===
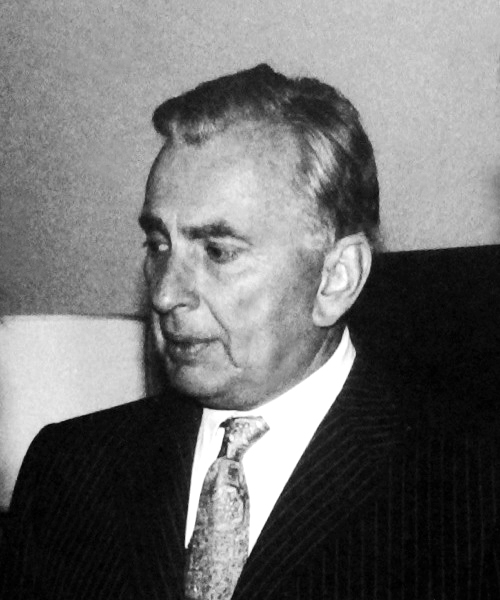
Gore Vidal

Wyler felt Tunberg's draft was too much of a morality play overlaid with current Western political overtones, and that the dialogue was too modern-sounding. Zimbalist brought in playwright S. N. Behrman (who also wrote the script for Quo Vadis) and then playwright Maxwell Anderson to write drafts. Gore Vidal biographer Fred Kaplan states that British poet and playwright Christopher Fry was hired simultaneously with Vidal, although most sources (including Vidal himself) state that Vidal followed Anderson, and that Fry did not come aboard until Vidal was close to leaving the picture. Vidal arrived in Rome in early March 1958 to meet with Wyler. (Note: Vidal says he worked on the script for three months. Fry did not arrive in Rome until May 1958 and Vidal says he did not leave Rome until mid or late June, so Vidal's arrival in Rome can be deduced with some accuracy. See: Vidal, p. 73; Herman, pp. 400–01.) Vidal claimed that Wyler had not read the script, and that when he did so (at Vidal's urging) on his flight from the U.S. to Italy, he was upset with the modernist dialogue. Vidal agreed to work on the script for three months so that he would come off suspension and fulfill his contract with MGM, although Zimbalist pushed him to stay throughout the entire production. Vidal was researching a book on the 4th century Roman emperor Julian and knew a great deal about ancient Rome. That book was eventually published in 1964 under the title Julian.

Vidal's working style was to finish a scene and review it with Zimbalist. Once Vidal and Zimbalist had come to agreement, the scene would be passed to Wyler. Vidal said he kept the structure of the Tunberg/Behrman/Anderson script, but rewrote nearly all the dialogue. Vidal admitted to William Morris in March 1959 that Fry rewrote as much as a third of the dialogue which Vidal had added to the first half of the script. Vidal made one structural change which was not revised, however. The Tunberg script had Ben-Hur and Messala reuniting and falling out in a single scene. Vidal broke the scene in two, so that the men first reunite at the Castle Antonia and then later argue and end their friendship at Ben-Hur's home. Vidal also added small character touches to the script, such as Messala's purchase of a brooch for Tirzah and Ben-Hur's purchase of a horse for Messala. Vidal claimed that he worked on the first half of the script (everything up to the chariot race), and scripted 10 versions of the scene where Ben-Hur confronts Messala and begs for his family's freedom.

Vidal's claim about a homoerotic subtext is hotly debated. Vidal first made the claim in an interview in the 1995 documentary film The Celluloid Closet, and asserted that he persuaded Wyler to direct Stephen Boyd to play the role as if he were a spurned homosexual lover. Vidal said that he believed that Messala's vindictiveness could only be motivated by the feeling of rejection that a lover would feel, and claimed to have suggested to Wyler that Stephen Boyd should play the role that way, and that Heston be kept in the dark about the Messala character's motivations. Whether Vidal wrote the scene in question or had the acting conversation with Wyler, and whether Wyler shot what Vidal wrote, remain issues of debate. Wyler himself said that he did not remember any conversation about this part of the script or Boyd's acting with Gore Vidal, and that he discarded Vidal's draft in favor of Fry's. Morgan Hudgens, publicity director for the film, however, wrote to Vidal in late May 1958 about the crucial scene, and implied there was a homosexual context: "... the big cornpone [the crew's nickname for Heston] really threw himself into your 'first meeting' scene yesterday. You should have seen those boys embrace!" Film critic F. X. Feeney, in a comparison of script drafts, concludes that Vidal made significant and extensive contributions to the script.

The final writer on the film was Christopher Fry. Charlton Heston has claimed that Fry was Wyler's first choice as screenwriter, but that Zimbalist forced him to use Vidal. Whether Fry worked on the script before Vidal or not, sources agree that Fry arrived in Rome in early May 1958 and spent six days a week on the set, writing and rewriting lines of dialogue as well as entire scenes, until the picture was finished. In particular, Fry gave the dialogue a slightly more formal and archaic tone without making it sound stilted and medieval. A highly publicized bitter dispute later broke out over screenplay credits to the film, involving Wyler, Tunberg, Vidal, Fry and the Screen Writers' Guild. (Note: See: Production of Ben-Hur (1959 film)) In 1996, the Los Angeles Times published a brief letter from Charlton Heston taking issue with Vidal's version which, he wrote, "irritates the hell out of me". Three months later, the paper published a 1,200 word response from Vidal, which included the statement that, with regard to the controversial scene's subtext, he had been delegated to inform Boyd (who was "delighted"), but that Wyler had warned "don't tell Chuck because he'll fall apart".

The final script ran to 230 pages. The screenplay differed more from the original novel than did the 1925 silent film version. Some changes made the film's storyline more dramatic. The role of Esther was greatly expanded from that of the novel to provide a strong onscreen love interest throughout the film. Other changes included incorporating an admiration for the Jewish culture and people (historical and modern), as well as representing the more pluralistic society of 1950s America rather than the "Christian superiority" view of Wallace's novel (though the film retained a strongly positive religious portrayal of Early Christianity).

=== Casting ===
MGM opened a casting office in Rome in mid-1957 to select the 50,000 people who would act in minor roles and as extras in the film, and a total of 365 actors had speaking parts in the film, although only 45 of them were considered "principal" performers. In casting, Wyler placed heavy emphasis on characterization rather than looks or acting history. He typically cast the Romans with British actors (speaking in typically upper-class British accents) and the Jews with American actors (with American accents) and used a form of linguistic coding to help underscore the divide between the two groups. The Romans were the aristocrats in the film, and Wyler believed that American audiences would interpret British accents as patrician; conversely, American accents in Hollywood epics were often associated with liberty and piety in the mid-20th century.

Several actors were offered the role of Judah Ben-Hur before it was accepted by Charlton Heston. Burt Lancaster stated he turned down the role because he found the script boring and belittling to Christianity. (Note: Buford also says MGM offered Lancaster $1 million to star in the picture, and to pay off $2.5 million in debts owed by Lancaster's production company. Still Lancaster refused. See: Buford, p. 190.) Paul Newman turned it down because he said he didn't have the legs to wear a tunic. Marlon Brando, Rock Hudson, (Note: Hudson's agent, Henry Willson, refused to allow Hudson to take the role, believing that historical costume epics were not right for his client. See: Bret, p. 95; Gates and Thomas, p. 125.) and Geoffrey Horne (Note: Industry columnist Louella Parsons claimed that Horne was all but cast in the film, due to his performance in The Bridge on the River Kwai. See: Hofler, p. 320.) were also offered the role, as were a number of muscular, handsome Italian actors (many of whom did not speak English). Kirk Douglas was interested in the role, but was turned down in favor of Heston, (Note: This inspired Douglas to make Spartacus a year later.) who was formally cast on January 22, 1958. His salary was $250,000 for 30 weeks, a prorated salary for any time over 30 weeks, and travel expenses for his family.

Stephen Boyd was cast as the antagonist, Messala, on April 13, 1958. William Wyler originally wanted Heston for the role, but sought another actor after he moved Heston into the role of Judah Ben-Hur. Because both Boyd and Heston had blue eyes, Wyler had Boyd outfitted with brown contact lenses as a way of contrasting the two men. Marie Ney was originally cast as Miriam, but was fired after two days of work because she could not cry on cue. Heston says that he was the one who suggested that Wyler cast Martha Scott as Miriam, and she was hired on July 17, 1958. (Note: Martha Scott had played the mother of Heston's Moses in The Ten Commandments, and he'd worked with her previously on Broadway) Cathy O'Donnell was Wyler's sister-in-law, and although her career was in decline, Wyler cast her as Tirzah.

More than 30 actresses were considered for the role of Esther. The Israeli actress Haya Harareet, a relative newcomer to film, was cast as Esther on May 16, 1958, after providing a 30-second silent screen test. Wyler had met her at the Cannes Film Festival, where she impressed him with her conversational skills and force of personality. Sam Jaffe was cast as Simonides on April 3, 1958, and Finlay Currie was cast as Balthasar on the same day. Wyler had to persuade Jack Hawkins to appear in the film, because Hawkins was unwilling to act in another epic motion picture so soon after The Bridge on the River Kwai. Hugh Griffith, who gained acclaim in the post-World War II era in Ealing Studios comedies, was cast as the colorful Sheik Ilderim. The role of Jesus, whose face is never seen, was played by an uncredited Claude Heater, an American opera singer performing with the Vienna State Opera in Rome when he was asked to do a screen test for the film.

Myrna Hansen, who was crowned Miss USA in 1953, was considered for the role of a leper.

=== Cinematography ===
The chariot race scene, illustrating the extremely wide aspect ratio used (2.76:1)

Robert L. Surtees, who had already filmed several of the most successful epics of the 1950s, was hired as cinematographer for the film. Early on in the film's production, Zimbalist and other MGM executives made the decision to film the picture in a widescreen format. Wyler strongly disliked the widescreen format, commenting that "Nothing is out of the picture, and you can't fill it. You either have a lot of empty space, or you have two people talking and a flock of others surrounding them who have nothing to do with the scene. Your eye just wanders out of curiosity." The cameras were also quite large, heavy, and difficult and time-consuming to move. To overcome these difficulties, Surtees and Wyler collaborated on using the widescreen lenses, film stocks, and projection technologies to create highly detailed images for the film. Wyler was best known for composition in depth, a visual technique in which people, props, and architecture are not merely composed horizontally but in depth of field as well. He also had a strong preference for long takes, during which his actors could move within this highly detailed space.

The film was filmed in a process known as "MGM Camera 65". 1957's Raintree County was the first MGM film to use the process. The MGM Camera 65 used special 65 mm Eastmancolor film stock with a 2.76:1 aspect ratio. 70 mm anamorphic camera lenses developed by the Mitchell Camera Company were manufactured to specifications submitted by MGM. These lenses squeezed the image down 1.25 times to fit on the image area of the film stock. Because the film could be adapted to the requirements of individual theaters, movie houses did not need to install special, expensive 70 mm projection equipment. Six of the 70 mm lenses, each worth $100,000, were shipped to Rome for use by the production. (Note: Most sources agree that the lenses were worth $100,000 each. But at least one source puts the value of each lens at $250,000. See: Herman, p. 406.)

=== Principal photography ===
I spent sleepless nights trying to find a way to deal with the figure of Christ. It was a frightening thing when all the great painters of twenty centuries have painted events you have to deal with, events in the life of the best-known man who ever lived. Everyone already has his own concept of him. I wanted to be reverent, and yet realistic. Crucifixion is a bloody, awful, horrible thing, and a man does not go through it with a benign expression on his face. I had to deal with that. It is a very challenging thing to do that and get no complaints from anybody.

— Wyler on the difficulty of shooting the crucifixion scene.

Pre-production began at Cinecittà Studios around October 1957. The MGM Art Department produced more than 15,000 sketches and drawings of costumes, sets, props, and other items needed for the film (8,000 alone for the costumes); photostatted each item; and cross-referenced and catalogued them for use by the production design team and fabricators. More than a million props were ultimately manufactured. Construction of miniatures for the entrance of Quintus Arrius into Rome and for the sea battle were underway by the end of November 1957. MGM location scouts arrived in Rome to identify shooting locations in August 1957. Location shooting in Africa was actively under consideration, and in mid-January 1958, MGM said that filming in North Africa (later revealed to be Libya) would begin on March 1, 1958, and that 200 camels and 2,500 horses had already been procured for the studio's use there. The production was then scheduled to move to Rome on April 1, where Andrew Marton had been hired as second unit director and 72 horses were being trained for the chariot race sequence. However, the Libyan government canceled the production's film permit for religious reasons on March 11, 1958, just a week before filming was to have begun. (Note: The Libyan government learned that the production was scheduled to shoot in Israel. Libya, which was at war with Israel, had enacted legislation in 1957 banning any individual or company from doing business with Israel or Jews.) It is unclear whether any second unit filming took place in Israel. A June 8, 1958, report in The New York Times said second unit director Andrew Marton had roamed "up and down the countryside" filming footage. However, the American Film Institute claims the filming permit was revoked in Israel for religious reasons as well (although when is not clear), and no footage from the planned location shooting near Jerusalem appeared in the film.

Principal photography began in Rome on May 18, 1958. The script was still unfinished when cinematography began, so that Wyler had only read the first 10 to 12 pages of it. Shooting lasted for 12 to 14 hours a day, six days a week. On Sundays, Wyler would meet with Fry and Zimbalist for story conferences. The pace of the film was so grueling that a doctor was brought onto the set to give a vitamin B complex injection to anyone who requested it (shots which Wyler and his family later suspected may have contained amphetamines). To speed things up, Wyler often kept principal actors on stand-by, in full costume and make-up, so that he could shoot pick-up scenes if the first unit slowed down. Actresses Martha Scott and Cathy O'Donnell spent almost the entire month of November 1958 in full leprosy make-up and costumes so that Wyler could shoot "leper scenes" when other shots did not go well. Wyler was unhappy with Heston's performances, feeling they did not make Judah Ben-Hur a plausible character, and Heston had to reshoot "I'm a Jew" 16 times. Shooting took nine months, which included three months for the chariot race scene alone. Principal photography ended on January 7, 1959, with filming of the crucifixion scene, which took four days to shoot.

=== Production design ===
Italy was MGM's top choice for hosting the production. However, a number of countries—including France, Mexico, Spain, and the United Kingdom—were also considered. Cinecittà Studios, a very large motion picture production facility constructed in 1937 on the outskirts of Rome, was identified early on as the primary shooting location. Zimbalist hired Wyler's long-term production supervisor, Henry Henigson, to oversee the film, and art directors William A. Horning and Edward Carfagno created the overall look of the film, relying on the more than five years of research which had already been completed for the production. A skeleton crew of studio technicians arrived in the summer of 1956 to begin preparing the Cinecittà soundstages and back lot.

The Ben-Hur production utilized 300 sets scattered over 148 acres (60 ha) and nine sound stages. Several sets still standing from Quo Vadis in 1951 were refurbished and used for Ben-Hur. By the end of the production more than 1,000,000 pounds (450,000 kg) of plaster and 40,000 cubic feet (1,100 m^{3}) of lumber were used. The budget called for more than 100,000 costumes and 1,000 suits of armor to be made, for the hiring of 10,000 extras, and the procurement of hundreds of camels, donkeys, horses, and sheep. Costume designer Elizabeth Haffenden oversaw a staff of 100 wardrobe fabricators who began manufacturing the costumes for the film a year before filming began. Special silk was imported from Thailand, the armor manufactured in West Germany, and the woolens made and embroidered in the United Kingdom and various countries of South America. Many leather goods were hand-tooled in the United Kingdom as well, while Italian shoemakers manufactured the boots and shoes. The lace for costumes came from France, while costume jewelry was purchased in Switzerland. More than 400 pounds (180 kg) of hair were donated by women in the Piedmont region of Italy to make wigs and beards for the production, and 1,000 feet (300 m) of track laid down for the camera dollies. A workshop employing 200 artists and workmen provided the hundreds of friezes and statues needed. The mountain village of Arcinazzo Romano, 40 miles (64 km) from Rome, served as a stand-in for the town of Nazareth. Beaches near Anzio were also used, and caves just south of the city served as the leper colony. Some additional desert panoramas were shot in Arizona, and some close-up inserts taken at the MGM Studios, with the final images photographed on February 3, 1958.

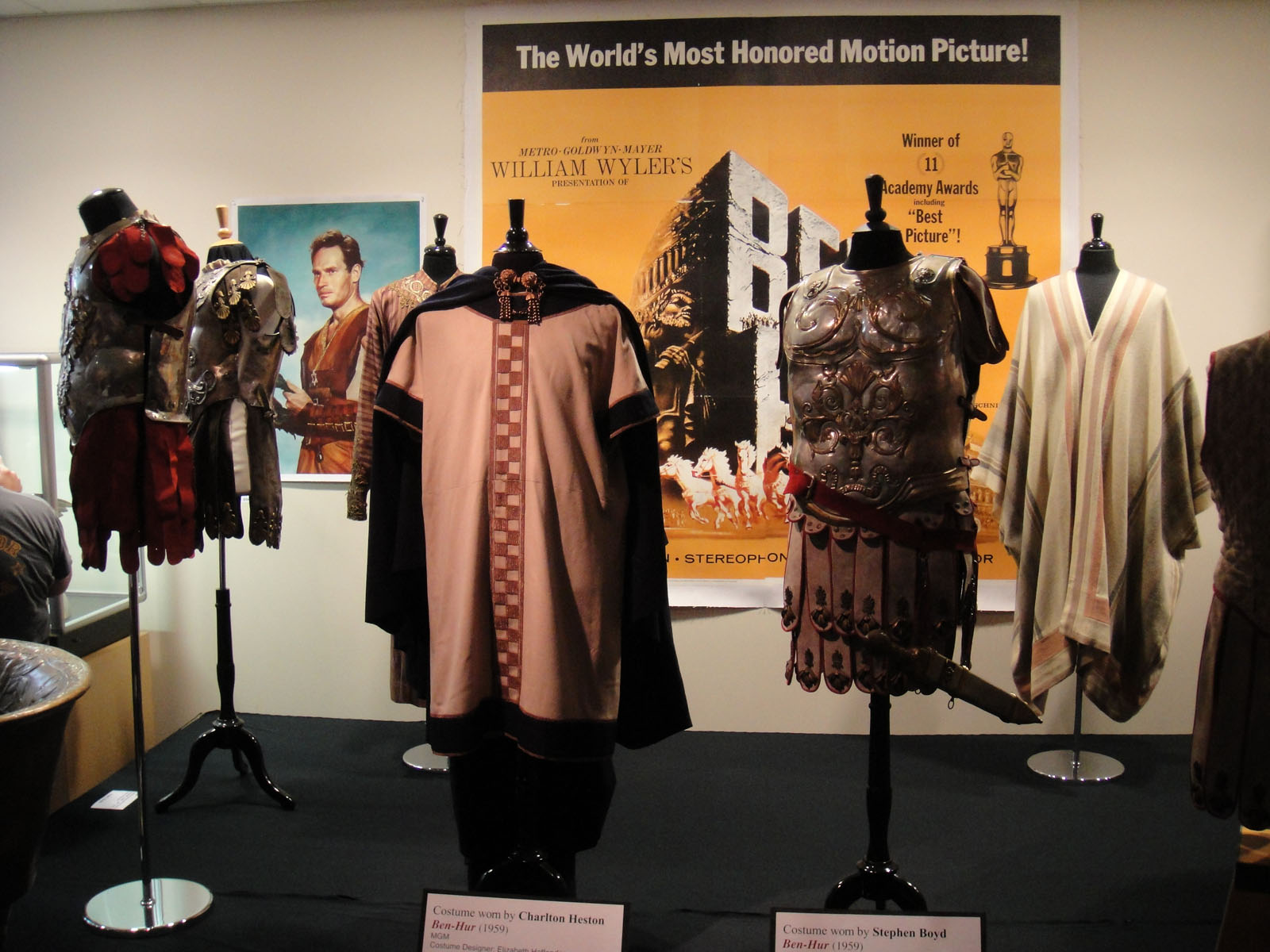
Costumes used in Ben-Hur from the 2011 Debbie Reynolds auctions

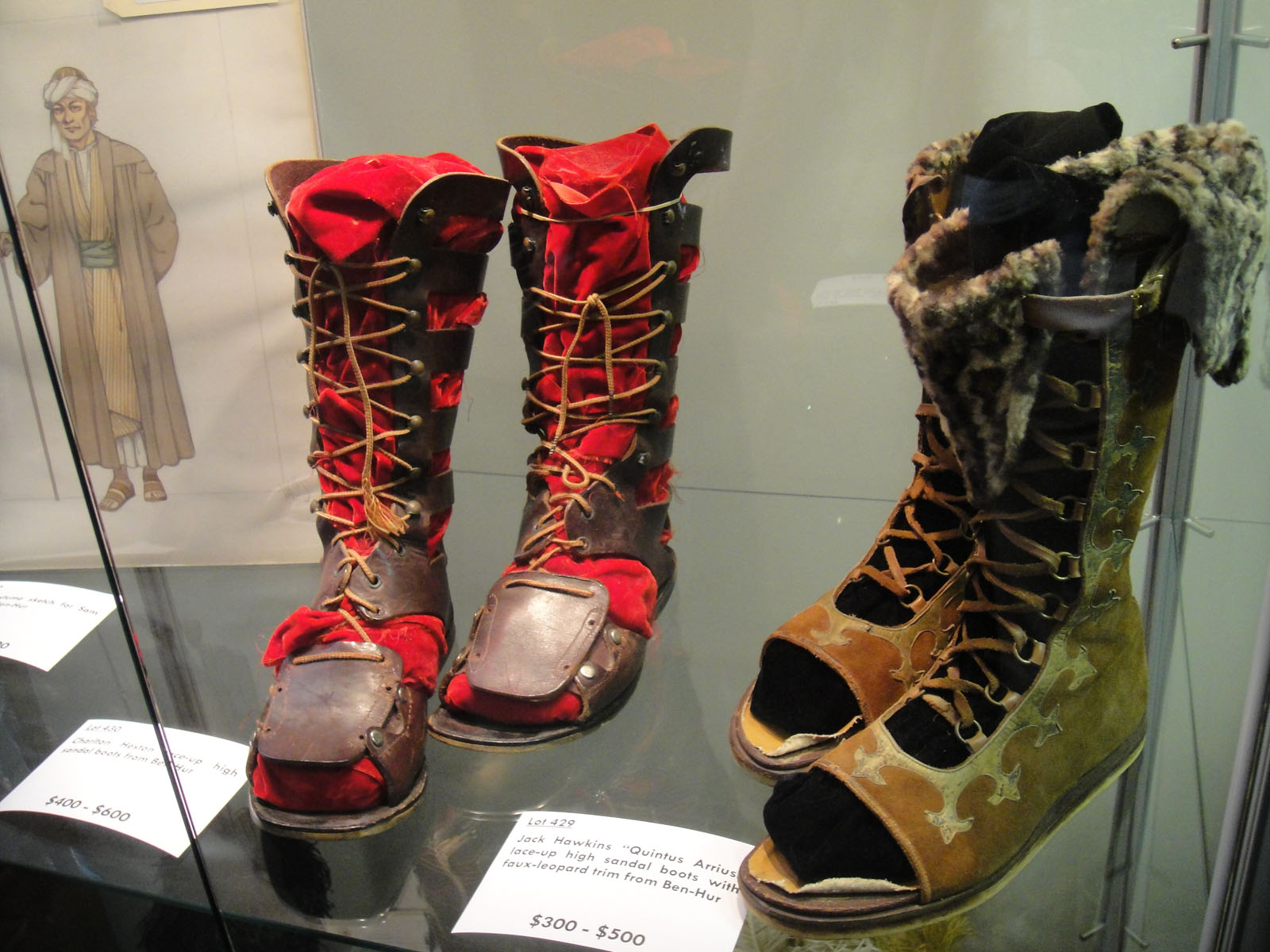
Charlton Heston and Jack Hawkins's caliga sandal-boots

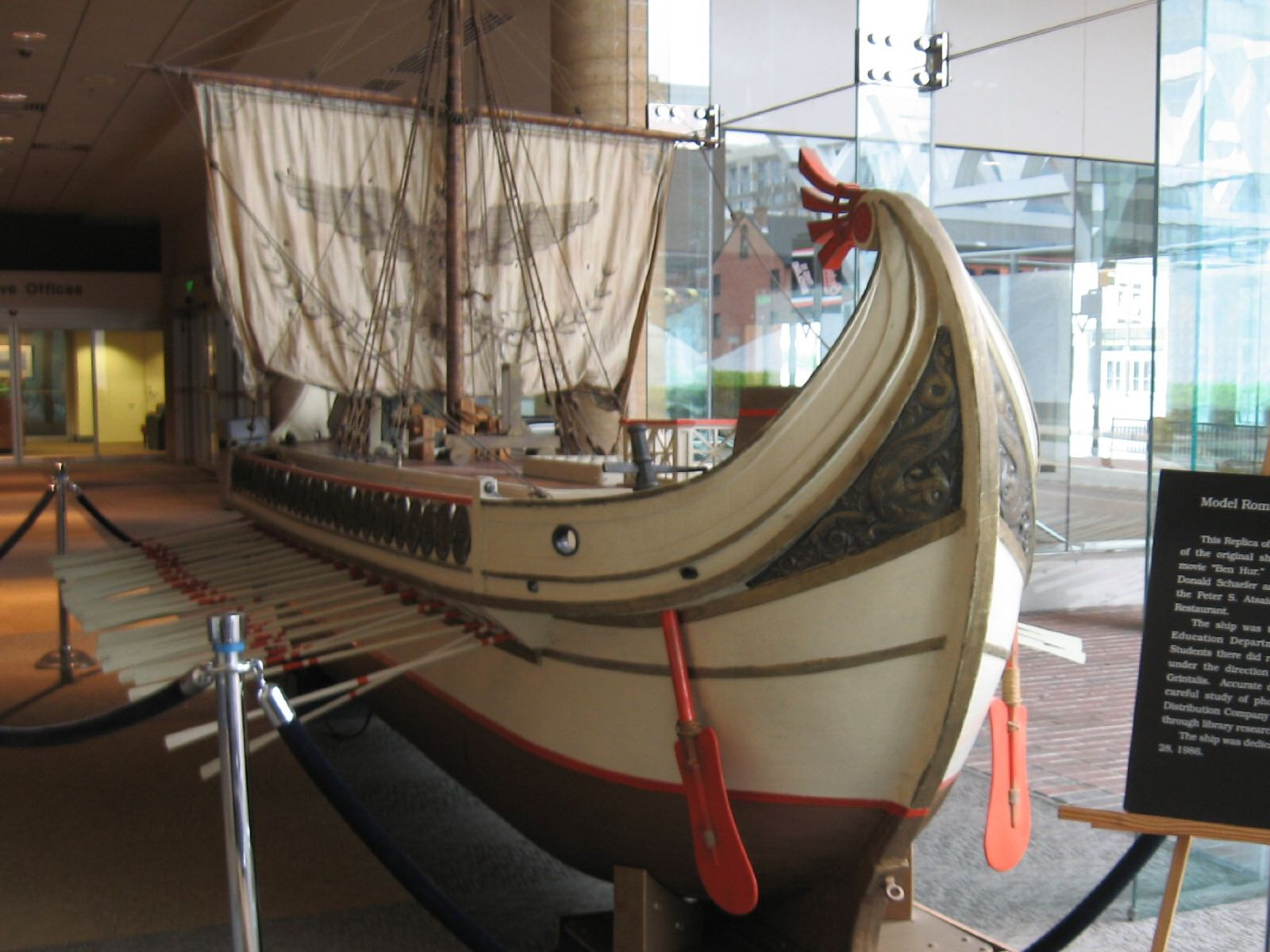
One of the miniature Roman galleys used in Ben-Hur in 1959

The sea battle was one of the first sequences created for the film, filmed using miniatures in a huge tank on the back lot at the MGM Studios in Culver City, California, in November and December 1957. More than 40 miniature ships and two 175-foot (53 m) long Roman galleys, each of them seaworthy, were built for the live-action segment. The ships were constructed based on plans found in Italian museums for actual ancient Roman galleys. An artificial lake with equipment capable of generating sea-sized waves was built at the Cinecittà studios to accommodate the galleys. A massive backdrop, 200 feet (61 m) wide by 50 feet (15 m) high, was painted and erected to hide the city and hills in the background. To make the scene bloodier, Dunning sought out Italian extras who had missing limbs, then had the makeup crews rig them with fake bone and blood to make it appear as if they had lost a hand or leg during the battle. When Dunning edited his own footage later, he made sure that these men were not on screen for so long that audiences would be upset. (Note: There was so much footage of the sea battle left over that Charlton Heston used it in his 1972 film Antony and Cleopatra.) The above-decks footage was integrated with the miniature work using process shots and traveling mattes.

One of the most lavish sets was the villa of Quintus Arrius, which included 45 working fountains and 8.9 miles (14.3 km) of pipes. Wealthy citizens and nobles of Rome, who wanted to portray their ancient selves, acted as extras in the villa scenes. To recreate the ancient city streets of Jerusalem, a vast set covering 0.5-square-mile (1.3 km^{2}) was built, which included a 75-foot (23 m) high Jaffa Gate. The sets were so vast and visually exciting that they became a tourist attraction, and various film stars visited during production. The huge sets could be seen from the outskirts of Rome, and MGM estimated that more than 5,000 people were given tours of the sets.

Dismantling the sets cost $125,000. Almost all the filmmaking equipment was turned over to the Italian government, which sold and exported it. MGM turned title to the artificial lake over to Cinecittà. MGM retained control over the costumes and the artificial lake background, which went back to the United States. The chariots were also returned to the U.S., where they were used as promotional props. The life-size galleys and pirate ships were dismantled to prevent them from being used by competing studios. Some of the horses were adopted by the men who trained them, while others were sold. Many of the camels, donkeys, and other exotic animals were sold to circuses and zoos in Europe.

=== Editing ===
A total of 1,100,000 feet (340,000 m) of footage was shot for the film. According to editor John D. Dunning, the first cut of the film was four and a half hours long. (Note: A mass media report in March 1959 indicated the running time was actually closer to five hours.) William Wyler stated that his goal was to bring the running time down to three and a half hours. The most difficult editing decisions, according to Dunning, came during scenes that involved Jesus Christ, as these contained almost no dialogue and most of the footage was purely reaction shots by actors. Dunning also believed that in the final cut the leper scene was too long and needed trimming. Editing was also complicated by the 70mm footage being printed. Because no editing equipment (such as the Moviola) existed which could handle the 70mm print, the 70mm footage would be reduced to 35mm and then cut. This caused much of the image to be lost. When the film was edited into its final form, it ran 213 minutes and included just 19,000 feet (5,800 m) of film.

=== Musical score ===
The film score was composed and conducted by Miklós Rózsa, who had scored Quo Vadis and most of MGM's historical films of the 1950s. Rózsa researched Greek and Roman music, incorporating this work into his score for authenticity. Rózsa himself directed the 100-piece MGM Symphony Orchestra during the 12 recording sessions (which stretched over 72 hours). The soundtrack was recorded in six-channel stereo. More than three hours of music were composed for the film, and two-and-a-half hours of it were finally used, making it at the time the longest score ever composed for a motion picture. It was finally surpassed in 2021 by the near 4-hour long score of Zack Snyder's Justice League.

Rózsa won his third Academy Award for his score. Like most film musical soundtracks, it was issued as an album for the public to enjoy as a distinct piece of music. The score was so lengthy that it had to be released in 1959 on three LP records, although a one-LP version with Carlo Savina conducting the Symphony Orchestra of Rome was also issued. In addition, to provide a more "listenable" album, Rózsa arranged his score into a "Ben-Hur Suite", which was released on Lion Records (an MGM subsidiary that issued low-priced records) in 1959. This made the Ben-Hur film musical score the first to be released not only in its entirety but also as a separate album.

The Ben-Hur score has been considered the best of Rózsa's career. The musical soundtrack to Ben-Hur remained deeply influential into the mid-1970s, when film music composed by John Williams for films such as Jaws, Star Wars, and Raiders of the Lost Ark became more popular among composers and film-goers. Rózsa's score has since seen several notable re-releases, including by the Nuremberg Symphony Orchestra on Capitol Records in 1967, several of the tracks by the United Kingdom's National Philharmonic Orchestra and Chorus on Decca Records in 1977 and a Sony Music reissue as a two-CD set in 1991. In 2012, Film Score Monthly WaterTower Music issued a limited edition five-CD set of music from the film. A two-CD set was released by Tadlow Music in 2017 of the complete motion picture score by The City of Prague Philharmonic Orchestra and Chorus.

=== Animal welfare ===
In contrast to the 1925 film, during the making of which at least one hundred horses were reported to have died, director William Wyler brought in Yakima Canutt to ensure the safety of the animals. No horse was injured while shooting the chariot race sequence.

=== Sam Zimbalist ===
Producer Sam Zimbalist had a heart attack on November 4, 1958, while on the set. He was taken to his villa where he died, aged 57.

== Chariot race sequence ==
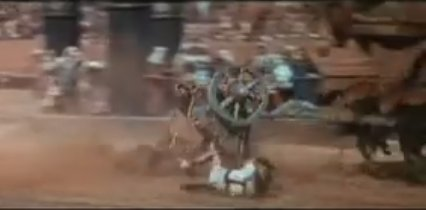
Chariot wreckage in Ben-Hur

The chariot race in Ben-Hur was directed by Andrew Marton and Yakima Canutt, filmmakers who often acted as second unit directors on other people's films. Each man had an assistant director, who shot additional footage. Among these was Sergio Leone, who was senior assistant director in the second unit and responsible for retakes. William Wyler shot the "pageantry" sequence that occurs before the race, scenes of the jubilant crowd, and the victory scenes after the race concludes. The "pageantry" sequence before the race begins is a shot-by-shot remake of the same sequence from the 1925 silent film version. Knowing that the chariot race would be primarily composed of close-up and medium shots, Wyler added the parade in formation (even though it was not historically accurate) to impress the audience with the grandeur of the arena.

=== Set design ===
The chariot arena was modelled on a historic circus in Jerusalem. Covering 18 acres (7.3 ha), it was the largest film set ever built at that time. Constructed at a cost of $1 million, it took a thousand workmen more than a year to carve the oval out of a rock quarry. The racetrack featured 1,500-foot (460 m) long straights and five-story-high grandstands. Over 250 miles (400 km) of metal tubing were used to erect the grandstands. Matte paintings created the illusion of upper stories of the grandstands and the background mountains. More than 40,000 short tons (36,000 t) of sand were brought in from beaches on the Mediterranean to cover the track. Other elements of the circus were also historically accurate. Imperial Roman racecourses featured a raised 10-foot (3.0 m) high spina (the center section), metae (columnar goalposts at each end of the spina), dolphin-shaped lap counters, and carceres (the columned building in the rear which housed the cells where horses waited prior to the race). The four statues atop the spina were 30 feet (9.1 m) high. A chariot track identical in size was constructed next to the set and used to train the horses and lay out camera shots.

=== Preparation ===
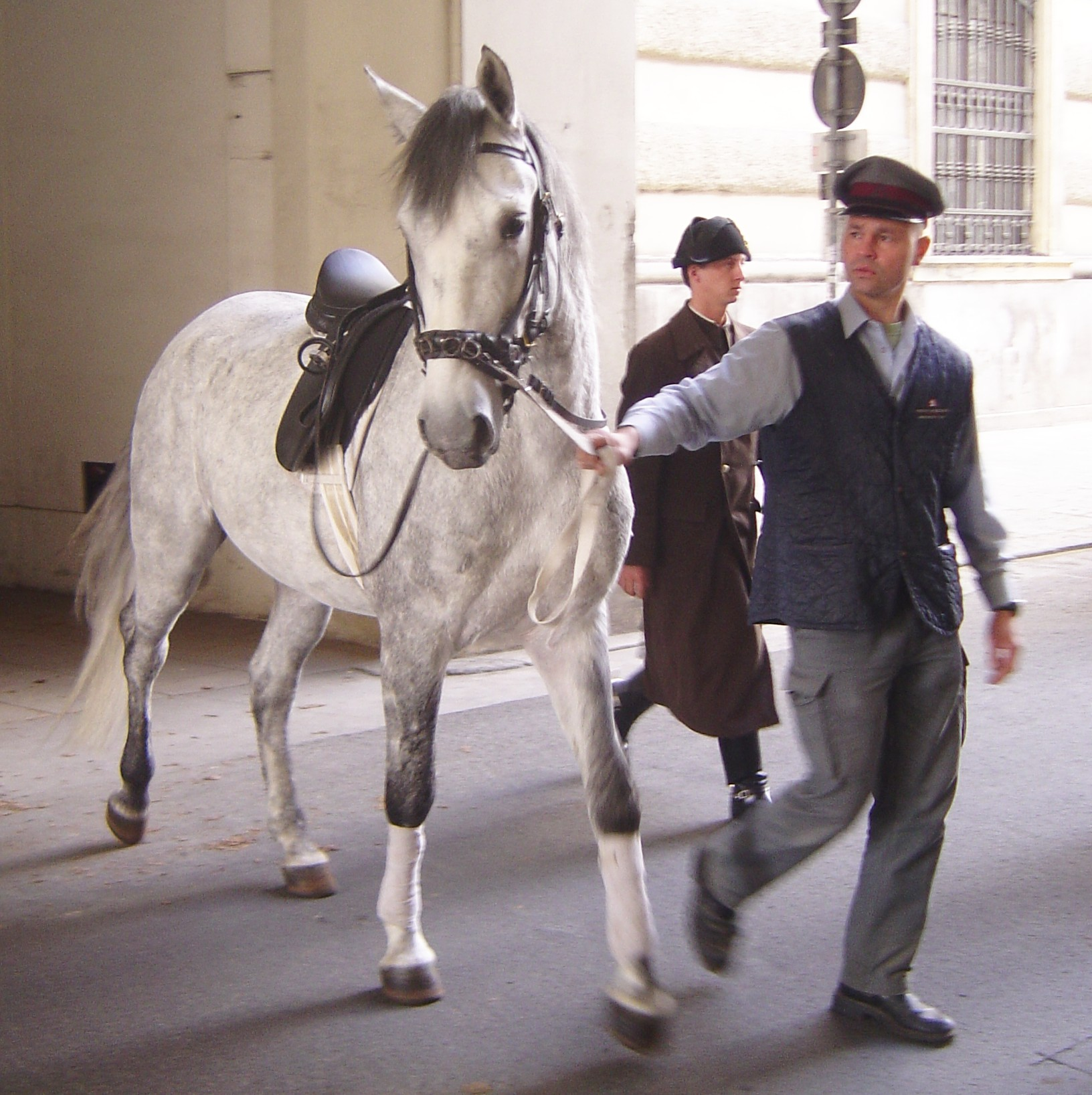
Lipizzan horses, like this one in Vienna, were used for chariot teams in Ben-Hur.

Planning for the chariot race took nearly a year to complete. Seventy-eight horses were bought and imported from Yugoslavia and Sicily in November 1957, exercised into peak physical condition, and trained by Hollywood animal handler Glenn Randall to pull the quadriga (a Roman Empire chariot drawn by four horses abreast). Andalusian horses played Ben-Hur's Arabians, while the others in the chariot race were primarily Lipizzans. A veterinarian, a harness maker, and 20 stable boys were employed to care for the horses and ensure they were outfitted for racing each day. The firm of Danesi Brothers built 18 chariots, nine of which were used for practice, each weighing 900 pounds (410 kg). Principal cast members, stand-ins, and stunt people made 100 practice laps of the arena in preparation for shooting.

Heston and Boyd both had to learn how to drive a chariot. Heston, an experienced horseman, took daily three-hour lessons in chariot driving after he arrived in Rome and picked up the skill quickly. (Note: Heston also learned swordfighting, how to throw a javelin, camel riding, and rowing.) Heston was outfitted with special contact lenses to prevent the grit kicked up during the race from injuring his eyes. For the other charioteers, six actors with extensive experience with horses were flown in from Hollywood, including Giuseppe Tosi, who had once been a bodyguard for Victor Emmanuel III of Italy.

=== Filming ===
The chariot scene took five weeks (spread over three months) to film at a total cost of $1 million and required more than 200 miles (320 km) of racing to complete. Marton and Yakima Canutt filmed the entire chariot sequence with stunt doubles in long shot, edited the footage together, and showed the footage to Zimbalist, Wyler, and Heston to show them what the race should look like and to indicate where close-up shots with Heston and Boyd should go. Seven thousand extras were hired to cheer in the stands. (Note: There is dispute over the number of extras used in the chariot race scenes. At least one non-contemporary source puts the number at 15,000. See: Cyrino, p. 73.) Economic conditions in Italy were poor at the time, and as shooting for the chariot scene wound down, only 1,500 extras were needed on any given day. On June 6, 1958, more than 3,000 people seeking work were turned away. The crowd rioted, throwing stones and assaulting the set's gates until police arrived and dispersed them. Dynamite charges were used to show the chariot wheels and axles splintering from the effects of Messala's barbed-wheel attacks. Three lifelike dummies were placed at key points in the race to give the appearance of men being run over by chariots.

The cameras used during the chariot race also presented problems. The 70mm lenses had a minimum focusing distance of 50 feet (15 m), and the camera was mounted on a small Italian-made car so the camera crew could keep in front of the chariots. The horses, however, accelerated down the 1,500-foot (460 m) straight much faster than the car could, and the long focal length left Marton and Canutt with too little time to get their shots. The production company purchased a more powerful American car, but the horses were still too fast, and even with a head start, the filmmakers only had a few more seconds of shot time. As filming progressed, vast amounts of footage were shot for this sequence. The ratio of footage shot to footage used was 263:1, one of the highest ratios ever for a film.

One of the most notable moments in the race came from a near-fatal accident when stunt man Joe Canutt, Yakima Canutt's son, was tossed into the air by accident; he incurred a minor chin injury. Marton wanted to keep the shot, but Zimbalist felt the footage was unusable. Marton conceived the idea of showing that Ben-Hur was able to land on and cling to the front of his chariot, then scramble back into the quadriga while the horses kept going. The long shot of Canutt's accident was cut together with a close-up of Heston climbing back aboard, resulting in one of the race's most memorable moments. Boyd did all but two of his own stunts. For the sequence where Messala is dragged beneath a chariot's horses and trampled, Boyd wore steel armor under his costume and acted out the close-up shot and the shot of him on his back, attempting to climb up into the horses' harness to escape injury. A dummy was used to obtain the trampling shot in this sequence.

Several urban legends exist regarding the chariot sequence. One asserts that a stuntman died during filming, which Nosher Powell claims in his autobiography, and another states that a red Ferrari can be seen during the chariot race, which the book Movie Mistakes calls a myth. Heston, in a DVD commentary track for the film, mentions that a third urban legend asserts that he wore a wristwatch during the chariot race, but points out that he wore leather bracers up to the elbow.

== Release ==
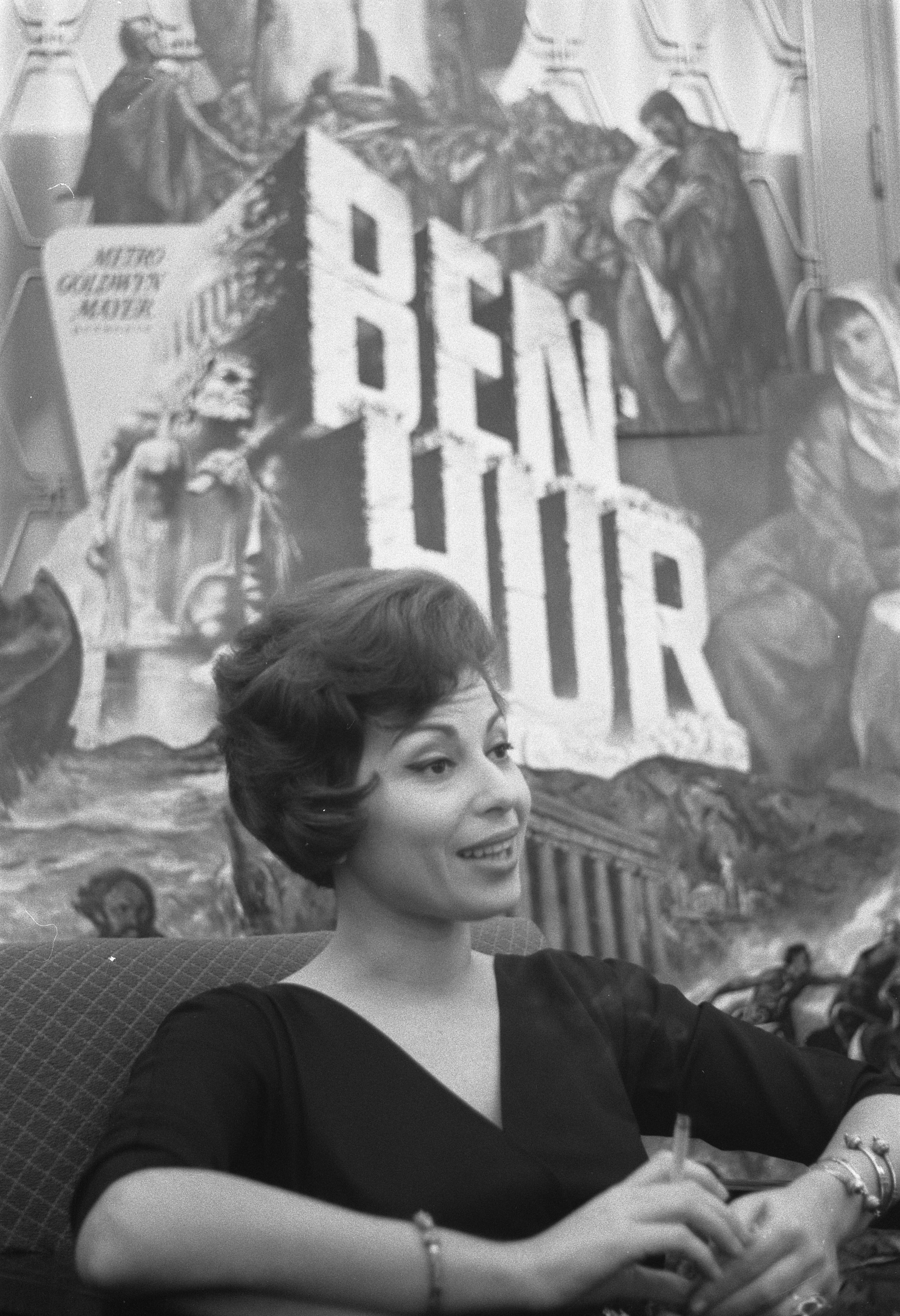
Haya Harareet promoting the film in Amsterdam in October 1960

A massive $14.7 million marketing effort helped promote Ben-Hur. MGM established a special "Ben-Hur Research Department" which surveyed more than 2,000 high schools in 47 American cities to gauge teenage interest in the film. A high school study guide was also created and distributed. Sindlinger and Company was hired to conduct a nationwide survey to gauge the impact of the marketing campaign. In 1959 and 1960, more than $20 million in candy; children's tricycles in the shape of chariots; gowns; hair barrettes; items of jewelry; men's ties; bottles of perfume; "Ben-Her" and "Ben-His" towels; toy armor, helmets, and swords; umbrellas; and hardback and paperback versions of the novel (tied to the film with cover art) were sold.

Ben-Hur premiered at Loew's State Theatre in New York City on November 18, 1959. Present at the premiere were William Wyler, Charlton Heston, Stephen Boyd, Haya Harareet, Martha Scott, Ramon Novarro (who played Judah Ben-Hur in the 1925 silent film version), Spyros Skouras (president of the 20th Century Fox), Barney Balaban (president of Paramount Pictures), Jack L. Warner (president of Warner Bros.), Leonard Goldenson (president of the American Broadcasting Company), Moss Hart (playwright), Robert Kintner (an ABC Television executive), Sidney Kingsley (playwright), and Adolph Zukor (founder of Paramount Pictures).

== Reception ==
=== Box office ===
During its initial release, the film earned $33.6 million in North American theater rentals (the distributor's share of the box office), generating approximately $74.7 million in box-office sales. It was number one at the monthly US box office for six months. Outside of North America, it earned $32.5 million in rentals (about $72.2 million at the box office) for a worldwide total of $66.1 million in rental earnings, roughly equivalent to $146.9 million in box-office receipts. It was the fastest-grossing film as well as the highest-grossing film of 1959, in the process becoming the second-highest-grossing film of all-time (at that time) behind Gone with the Wind. It was the highest-grossing film in Japan at the time, earning $2,722,000. Ben-Hur saved MGM from financial disaster, making a profit of $20,409,000 on its initial release, and another $10.1 million in profits when re-released in 1969. By 1989, Ben-Hur had earned $90 million in worldwide theatrical rentals.

=== Critical reception ===
Ben-Hur received overwhelmingly positive reviews upon its release. Bosley Crowther, writing for The New York Times, called Ben-Hur "a remarkably intelligent and engrossing human drama". While praising the acting and William Wyler's "close-to" direction, he also had high praise for the chariot race: "There has seldom been anything in movies to compare with this picture's chariot race. It is a stunning complex of mighty setting, thrilling action by horses and men, panoramic observation and overwhelming use of dramatic sound." Jack Gaver, writing for United Press International, also had praise for the acting, calling it full of "genuine warmth and fervor and finely acted intimate scenes".

Philip K. Scheuer of the Los Angeles Times called it "magnificent, inspiring, awesome, enthralling, and all the other adjectives you have been reading about it". He also called the editing "generally expert" although at times abrupt. Ronald Holloway, writing for Variety, called Ben-Hur "a majestic achievement, representing a superb blending of the motion picture arts by master craftsmen", and concluded that "Gone With the Wind, Metro's own champion all-time top grosser, will eventually have to take a back seat". The chariot race "will probably be preserved in film archives as the finest example of the use of the motion picture camera to record an action sequence. The race, directed by Andrew Marton and Yakima Canutt, represents some 40 minutes [sic] (Note: The chariot race lasts just over 8-and-a-half minutes. The entire circus sequence lasts just over 28-and-a-half minutes.) of the most hair-raising excitement that film audiences have ever witnessed."

Crowther felt the film was too long. Scheuer, while generally praising the film, felt that its biggest fault was "overstatement", and that it hammered home at points long after they had been made. He singled out the galley rowing sequence, Jesus's journey to the place of crucifixion, and nearly all the sequences involving the lepers. He also lightly criticized Charlton Heston for being more physically than emotionally compelling. John McCarten of The New Yorker was more critical of Heston, writing that he "speaks English as if he'd learned it from records". Film critic Dwight Macdonald also was largely negative. He found the film so uninvolving and lengthy that he "felt like a motorist trapped at a railroad crossing while a long freight train slowly trundles by". British film critic John Pym, writing for Time Out, called the film a "four-hour Sunday school lesson". Many French and American film critics who subscribed to the auteur theory saw the film as confirmation of their belief that William Wyler was "merely a commercial craftsman" rather than a serious artist.

In December 1959, in her review for the London Sunday Times, the veteran British film critic Dilys Powell expressed many serious reservations but still lavished praise on the film:

It is the best chariot race in the world, and no mistake. By now everybody has said so, and ... [my] only hope is that admiration may have special force when it is extorted from somebody who dislikes chariot races, shrinks from Biblical fiction and detests films ... which include the Crucifixion ...

... of the parts of this long, opulent film with its colour, its bright, sharp images, its stunning spectacle and its size ... I cannot complain. I still find that the whole is alien from me ...

... Nevertheless, if we must have films of this kind this is the one to have. After all, the spectacular scenes remain: the sea-fight, the Triumph, a magnificent storm and, of course, the chariot race—a scene superbly shot, superbly edited, superb in every way. I have never seen anything of its sort to touch it for excitement.

The review aggregator website Rotten Tomatoes reported that 88% of critics have given the film a positive review based on 116 reviews collected, with an average rating of 8.20/10. The critics consensus reads, "Colossal in scope without ever losing its delicate spiritual thread, Ben-Hur is a culmination of biblical epics that strikes an ideal balance between awesome scale and raw humanity." On Metacritic, the film has a weighted average score of 90 out of 100 based on 9 critics, indicating "universal acclaim".

The Japanese filmmaker Akira Kurosawa cited this film as one of his 100 favorite films.

In 2025, The Hollywood Reporter listed Ben-Hur as having the best stunts of 1959.

=== Accolades ===
32nd Academy Awards
1. Best Picture – Sam Zimbalist (posthumous award)
2. Best Director – William Wyler
3. Best Actor in a Leading Role – Charlton Heston
4. Best Actor in a Supporting Role – Hugh Griffith
5. Best Art Direction-Set Decoration – Color – Edward C. Carfagno and William A. Horning (posthumous award) (art direction); Hugh Hunt (set decoration)
6. Best Cinematography – Color – Robert L. Surtees
7. Best Costume Design – Color – Elizabeth Haffenden
8. Best Film Editing – John D. Dunning and Ralph E. Winters
9. Best Sound Recording – Franklin Milton, MGM Studio Sound Department
10. Best Music – Scoring of a Dramatic or Comedy Picture – Miklós Rózsa
11. Best Special Effects – A. Arnold Gillespie, Robert MacDonald, and Milo Lory
17th Golden Globe Awards
1. Best Motion Picture – Drama
2. Best Director – William Wyler
3. Best Supporting Actor – Motion Picture – Stephen Boyd

Ben-Hur was nominated for 12 Academy Awards and won an unprecedented 11. As of 2025, only Titanic in 1998 and The Lord of the Rings: The Return of the King in 2004 have matched the film's wins. The only category that Ben-Hur did not win was for Best Adapted Screenplay (losing to Room at the Top), and most observers attributed this to the controversy over the writing credit. MGM and Panavision shared a special technical Oscar in March 1960 for developing the Camera 65 photographic process.

Ben-Hur also won three Golden Globe Awards – Best Motion Picture – Drama, Best Director, Best Supporting Actor – Motion Picture for Stephen Boyd – and received a Special Achievement Award (which went to Andrew Marton for directing the chariot race sequence). Heston was nominated for a Golden Globe in the Best Performance by an Actor in a Motion Picture – Drama category, but did not win. The picture also won the BAFTA Award for Best Film, the New York Film Critics Circle Award for Best Film, and the Directors Guild of America Award for Outstanding Directorial Achievement in a Motion Picture for William Wyler's masterful direction.

Ben-Hur also appears on several "best of" lists generated by the American Film Institute, an independent non-profit organization created by the National Endowment for the Arts in 1967. The "AFI 100 Years... series" were created by juries consisting of over 1,500 artists, scholars, critics, and historians, with movies selected based on the film's popularity over time, historical significance, and cultural impact. Ben-Hur appeared at #72 on the 100 Movies, #49 on the 100 Thrills, #21 on the Film Scores, #56 on the 100 Cheers and #2 on the AFI's 10 Top 10 Epic film lists. In 2004, the National Film Preservation Board selected Ben-Hur for preservation by the National Film Registry for being a "culturally, historically, or aesthetically significant" motion picture. It was listed as number 491 on Empire's 500 Greatest films of all time. In 2016, the Directors Guild of America ranked the film 51st on its list of The 80 Best-Directed Films since the Guild’s founding in 1936.

The film was included by the Vatican in a list of important films compiled in 1995, under the category of "Religion".

=== Broadcast ===
The film's first telecast took place on Sunday, February 14, 1971. In what was a television first for a Hollywood film, it was broadcast over five hours (including commercials) during a single evening by CBS, (Note: Victor Davis Hanson erroneously states it was telecast over four nights. See: Cowley, p. ii.) preempting all of that network's regular programming for that one evening. It was watched by 85.82 million people for a 37.1 average rating. It was one of the highest-rated movies ever screened on television at the time (behind the broadcast premieres of The Birds and Bridge on the River Kwai).

=== Home media ===
Ben-Hur has been released on home video on several occasions. A two-sided single disc widescreen DVD release occurred in the United States on March 13, 2001. This release included several featurettes, including a commentary by Charlton Heston, a making-of documentary (made for a LaserDisc release in 1993), screen tests, and a photo gallery. This edition was released soon thereafter as a two-disc set in other countries. The film saw another DVD release on September 13, 2005. This four-disc edition included remastered images and audio, an additional commentary, two additional featurettes, and a complete version of the 1925 silent version of Ben-Hur. The film was also separated into two parts, with the first and second discs featuring the first and second halves respectively. A boxed "Deluxe Edition", issued in the U.S. in 2002, included postcard-sized reprints of lobby cards, postcard-sized black-and-white stills with machine-reproduced autographs of cast members, a matte-framed color image from the film with a 35mm film frame mounted below it, and a 27-by-40-inch (69 by 102 cm) reproduction film poster.

In 2011, Warner Home Video released a 50th anniversary edition on Blu-ray Disc and DVD, making it the first home release where the film is present on its original aspect ratio. For this release, the film was completely restored frame by frame from an 8K scan of the original 65mm negative. The restoration cost $1 million, and was one of the highest resolution restorations ever made by Warner Bros. A new musical soundtrack-only option and six new featurettes (one of which was an hour long) were also included.

On February 17, 2026, Warner Bros. released Ben-Hur on 4K Ultra HD Blu-ray.

== Adaptations ==
- Comic book • Dell Four Color #1052 (November 1959) • 32 pages in full color, plus covers • Published by Dell Publishing Co., Inc. • Designed and produced by Western Printing and Lithographing Co. • Copyright © 1959 by Loew's Incorporated • (cover painting by Sam Savitt • drawn by Russ Manning) [authorized film tie-in]
- Video game • Ben-Hur: Blood of Braves (January 2003) • PlayStation 2 • Developed and published by Microids • Chariot racing game

== See also ==
- List of American films of 1959
- List of historical drama films
- List of films set in ancient Rome
- List of films featuring slavery
- List of Academy Award records
