= Eric Orbom =

American art director

Eric Walter Orbom
- Born: July 6, 1915; Stockholm, Sweden
- Died: May 23, 1959 (aged 43); Los Angeles, California
- Occupation: Art director
- Years active: 1950 – 1959

Eric Walter Orbom (July 6, 1915 – May 23, 1959) was an American art director. He won a posthumous Academy Award in the category Best Art Direction for the film Spartacus.

== Biography ==
He was born on July 6, 1915, in Stockholm, Sweden to Walter Eric Gustav Orbom (1890–1915) and Signe Albertina Jonsson (1891–1961). He migrated to the United States in 1918 and lived in Salt Lake City, Utah. He died on May 23, 1959, in Los Angeles, California. He was interred at Forest Lawn Memorial Park (Hollywood Hills).

== Selected filmography ==
- Spartacus (1960)
