= Edward Carfagno =

American art director (1907–1996)

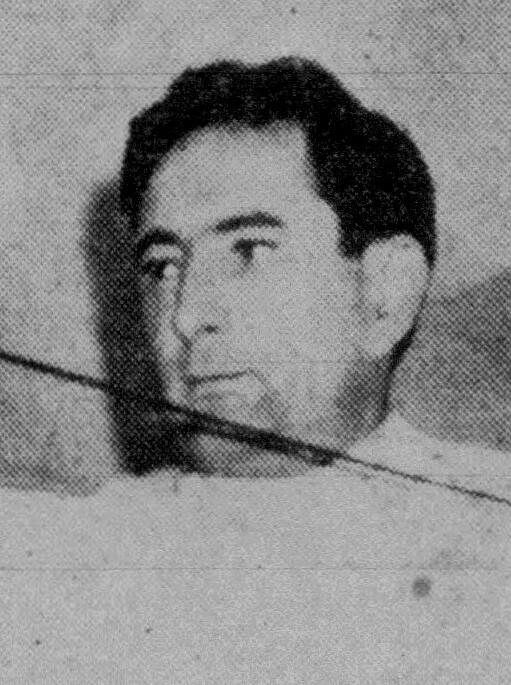
- Carfagno, circa 1941–42
- Born: November 28, 1907
- Died: December 28, 1996 (aged 89); Los Angeles, California, United States
- Occupation: art director
- Years active: 1939–1989

Edward Carfagno (November 28, 1907 – December 28, 1996) was an art director who established himself in the 1950s with his Oscar-winning work on such films as Vincente Minnelli's The Bad and the Beautiful (1952), Joseph Mankiewicz's Julius Caesar (1953) and William Wyler's Ben-Hur (1959) . Carfagno went on to work consistently on a variety of films, including five collaborations with Clint Eastwood including Tightrope (1984) and Heartbreak Ridge (1987).

Carfagno began working at MGM in 1933, and was also a member of the US's 1940 Olympic fencing team.

== See also ==
- Art Directors Guild Hall of Fame
