= From Generation to Generation =

1959 film

- Directed by: Francis Thompson; Philip Stapp
- Written by: Philip Stapp
- Produced by: Edward F. Cullen
- Production company: Cullen Associates for the Maternity Center Association
- Distributed by: McGraw Hill
- Release date: 1959
- Running time: 27 minutes
- Country: United States
- Language: English

From Generation to Generation is a 1959 American short documentary film directed by Francis Thompson and Philip Stapp and produced by Edward F. Cullen. The film shows live-action scenes of a farming family expecting a child in conjunction with animated scenes of the human reproductive system.

From Generation to Generation was nominated for an Academy Award for Best Documentary Short.

== See also ==
- List of American films of 1959
