= Joe Urla =

American film, stage and television actor

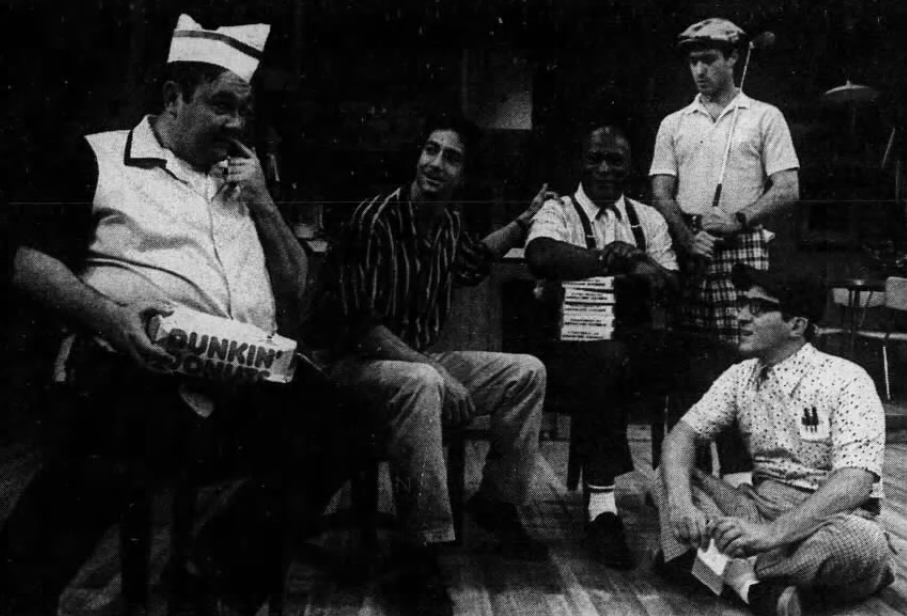
- Urla (upper right) with David Schramm, David Strathairn, John Amos and Joe Grifasi in The Boys Next Door, 1987
- Born: December 25, 1958 (age 67); Pontiac, Michigan, U.S.
- Education: University of Michigan (BA); Yale University (MFA)
- Occupation: Actor
- Years active: 1986–present
- Spouse: Jayne Atkinson (divorced)

Joe Urla (born December 25, 1958) is an American film, stage and television actor. He is best known for playing the recurring role of Elaine Benes's co-worker Dugan in the American sitcom television series Seinfeld.

== Life and career ==
Urla was born in Pontiac, Michigan. He attended and graduated from Pontiac Central High School. After graduating, he attended the University of Michigan. He also attended the Yale School of Drama, earning his master's degree. He began his screen career in 1986, appearing in the CBS crime drama television series The Equalizer, starring Edward Woodward and Keith Szarabajka. The next year, he appeared in the NBC crime drama television series Miami Vice, starring Don Johnson, Philip Michael Thomas, Saundra Santiago, Michael Talbott, Olivia Brown and Edward James Olmos. During his screen career, he appeared in stage plays such as Henry IV (as Prince Hal), The Boys Next Door (as Barry Klemper), Puntila and Matti, His Hired Man and The Way of the World.

Later in his career, in 1990, Urla starred as Officer Larry Alby in the ABC drama television series H.E.L.P., starring along with Tom Breznahan, Lance Edwards, Kim Flowers, Marjorie Monaghan, Wesley Snipes and John Mahoney. He guest-starred in numerous television programs including Homicide: Life on the Street, Dave's World, Home Improvement, Matlock, Law & Order (and its spin-offs Law & Order: Special Victims Unit and Law & Order: Criminal Intent), The Good Wife, The Blacklist and Spin City, and played the recurring role of Elaine Benes's co-worker Dugan in the NBC sitcom television series Seinfeld. He also appeared in films such as The Bodyguard (as Minella), The Wilde Wedding, Che and Strange Days.

Urla's most recent role was in the CBS police procedural television series Blue Bloods, starring Donnie Wahlberg, Bridget Moynahan, Will Estes, Len Cariou and Tom Selleck.
