= The Boys Next Door (1996 film) =

- VHS cover
- Genre: Comedy-drama
- Based on: The Boys Next Door by Tom Griffin
- Teleplay by: William Blinn
- Directed by: John Erman
- Starring: Nathan Lane; Robert Sean Leonard; Tony Goldwyn; Michael Jeter; Courtney B. Vance; Mare Winningham
- Music by: John Kander
- Country of origin: United States
- Original language: English

Production
- Executive producer: Richard Welsh
- Producer: John Erman
- Production location: Toronto
- Cinematography: Frank Tidy
- Editor: John W. Wheeler
- Running time: 100 minutes
- Production company: Hallmark Hall of Fame Productions

Original release
- Network: CBS
- Release: February 4, 1996

The Boys Next Door is a 1996 American comedy-drama television film produced and directed by John Erman, written by William Blinn, and starring Nathan Lane, Robert Sean Leonard, Tony Goldwyn, Michael Jeter, Courtney B. Vance, and Mare Winningham. Based on the stage play by Tom Griffin, it follows four intellectually disabled men (Lane, Leonard, Jeter, and Vance) living in a group home, and the social worker (Goldwyn) who looks after them.

The Boys Next Door was filmed in Toronto, Canada. It aired on CBS on February 4, 1996, as an episode of the Hallmark Hall of Fame anthology series.

== Plot ==
Four intellectually disabled men share a house and are looked after by Jack Palmer, their social worker. The four men try to make sense of a mixed-up world, dealing with everything from runaway rodents to helping Norman, who has a new girlfriend. Jack's life with his wife is put on hold, and he feels it's time to let them go.

== Cast ==
- Tony Goldwyn as Jack Palmer
- Nathan Lane as Norman Bulansky
- Courtney B. Vance as Lucien P. Singer
- Michael Jeter as Arnold Wiggins
- Robert Sean Leonard as Barry Klemper
- Mare Winningham as Sheila
- Jenny Robertson as Rena
- Elizabeth Wilson as Mary Fremus
- Richard Jenkins as Bob Klemper
- Lynne Thigpen as Mrs. Tracy
- Caroline Aaron as Mrs. Warren

== Production ==
Filming took place in Toronto.

== Awards ==
- 1997 Won: Christopher Award
- 1996 Nominated: Primetime Emmy Award for Outstanding Supporting Actress in a Limited Series or Movie - Mare Winningham
- 1996 Nominated: Humanitas Prize
- 1997 Won: WGA Award
