= A Natural History of Ghosts =

2012 book by Roger Clarke

- Front cover of UK edition
- Author: Roger Clarke
- Language: English
- Publisher: Penguin
- Publication date: 2012
- Publication place: United Kingdom
- Media type: Print

A Natural History of Ghosts: 500 Years of Hunting for Proof is a book by Roger Clarke that was published in the UK in 2012 and in the US in 2015 (under the title Ghosts: A Natural History: 500 Years of Searching for Proof) and has been translated into other languages including Japanese and Korean.

Clarke gives the background to some of the best known paranormal stories of Western culture from the past 500 years. His approach, as described by Michael Newton, "is partly chronological, but also thematic, or rather taxonomic, dividing up his ghosts according to types."

A Natural History of Ghosts was positively reviewed, with The Guardian calling it a "highly enjoyable (and disturbing) work". The New York Times wrote: "Roger Clarke tells this [the story that inspired Henry James' The Turn of the Screw] and many other gloriously weird stories with real verve, and also a kind of narrative authority that tends to constrain the skeptical voice within... [an] erudite and richly entertaining book."
