= Janeway Lambda one =

Fictional storyline in Star Trek: Voyager

- Star Trek franchise element
- Kate Mulgrew as Captain Kathryn Janeway in the governess costume from the holonovel Janeway Lambda one
- First appearance: "Cathexis"; Star Trek: Voyager; 1995
- Created by: Jeri Taylor
- Genre: Science fiction

In-universe information
- Type: Holodeck technology
- Function: Recreational use

Janeway Lambda one is a holonovel, or advanced virtual reality adventure, featured in the science fiction television series Star Trek: Voyager. Set in the 24th century, the series follows the adventures of the Starfleet and Maquis crew of the starship USS Voyager after they are stranded in the Delta Quadrant, far from the rest of the Federation. In the holonovel, Kathryn Janeway (Kate Mulgrew), finds a temporary escape from her responsibilities as Voyager's captain by playing a governess, Lucy Davenport, in a Gothic novel set in Victorian England. The holonovel was a recurring subplot in the show's first two seasons. It features Michael Cumpsty as Lord Burleigh, and Thomas Dekker and Lindsey Haun as Burleigh's children. Carolyn Seymour guest stars as the housekeeper Mrs. Templeton, and previously played two separate Romulan commanders and Science Minister Mirasta Yale in Star Trek: The Next Generation.

Voyager's writing team developed the holonovel as an expansion of the holodeck, which was introduced earlier in the Star Trek franchise, and a futuristic response to the audiobook. Voyager creator Jeri Taylor initially imagined Janeway Lambda one as a simulation of Western fiction in which Janeway assumed the role of a pioneer woman struggling to contend with the elements and care for her family. The holonovel's genre was changed when Mulgrew refused to work with horses and the crew realized shooting outdoors would exceed the show's budget. The set for the Burleigh manor was constructed on Paramount Stage 16, and was nicknamed "the Jane Eyre set" by the film crew. Commentators also compared Janeway Lambda one to Henry James' novella The Turn of the Screw and Daphne du Maurier's novel Rebecca.

Parts of the holonovel were included in the teasers for the season one episodes "Cathexis" and "Learning Curve", and it was featured in the second-season episode "Persistence of Vision". In the holonovel's final appearance, Janeway experiences hallucinations of its characters and objects appearing outside of the holodeck due to a bio-electric energy field from a Bothan ship. Janeway Lambda one was intended as a vehicle to further develop Janeway, but critics disagreed on whether the storyline was appropriate for the character. The holonovel was never fully resolved due to lack of interest from Voyager fans. Taylor had written a conclusion for the holonovel, but it was never developed into an episode. Critics had a negative response to Janeway Lambda one, and questioned how it fit Janeway's role as a female captain. The show's frequent use and expansion of the holodeck technology was also panned by reviewers.

== Production ==
=== Concept and development ===
In the Star Trek franchise, the holodeck is a computer program capable of creating virtual reality simulations chosen by the user. It was first introduced in Star Trek: The Next Generation, but a precursor to the technology appeared in an episode of Star Trek: The Animated Series, entitled "The Practical Joker", as a technological advanced version of a recreation room. In The Next Generation, the holodeck was shown as being able to project "novellike stories", but Star Trek: Voyager expanded on this idea to introduce the "fully interactive holonovel". Holonovels were distinguished from past examples of holodeck technology through their "complex narratives" and the user's active participation as one of the characters. Developing the holonovel as a futuristic update of the audiobook, Voyager's writers defined them as computer programs enabling the user to "experience total, physical immersion in the story, with a full spectrum of sensations in every way". In his book A Vision of the Future, author Stephan Edward Poe wrote the holonovel was intended to provide: "new ways for crew members to learn ... to be their own heroes in self-directed sages, or even use their stories as a safe and acceptable means of released pent-up emotions."

Voyager creator Jeri Taylor designed Janeway Lambda one as Captain Kathryn Janeway's (Kate Mulgrew)'s favorite holonovel and a "story within a story" that would slowly unravel with each of its appearances. It was the first holonovel to be featured in the series. Taylor originally imagined the program as a simulation of Western fiction, in which Janeway assumed the role of a pioneer emigrating to the American West on a covered wagon. Janeway's character was described as a wife and mother struggling with daily tasks, and was presented as the polar opposite of Janeway's position as a Starfleet Captain. Taylor described the Western concept as a "metaphor for the captain's predicament in the Delta Quadrant" and a "method of developing and enhancing Janeway's character". The plan was subsequently abandoned after Mulgrew disliked working with horses and estimates for developing and filming each scene ranged up to an additional $100,000 per day. Taylor said it was "not a prudent decision" to keep the Western concept considering the show's budget and the difficulty in shooting outdoor locations. As a result, the concept of Janeway Lambda one was changed to be a work of Gothic fiction set in 1840s England in which Janeway plays Mrs Lucille Davenport.

Janeway Lambda one features a recurring set of guest stars, who played various members of the Burleigh family and household. Michael Cumpsty was cast as Lord Burleigh, Davenport's love interest. Burleigh's two children, Henry and Beatrice, were played by Thomas Dekker and Lindsey Haun, respectively. Carolyn Seymour portrayed the housekeeper Mrs. Templeton. Seymour had previously guest-starred as the Romulan Subcommander Taris and the Romulan Commander Toreth in The Next Generation episodes "Contagion" and "Face of the Enemy". Bridget, a servant who worked for Lord Burleigh, was played by an uncredited actress. While Lord Burleigh's late wife plays a large role in the holonovel, she is only shown in a portrait, and does not appear in any of the episodes.

=== Direction and filming ===
Janeway Lambda one was scheduled to debut in the teaser of the first-season episode "Eye of the Needle", but it was moved to a different episode ("Cathexis"). Television producer Rick Berman wanted a "more exciting shipboard teaser" for "Eye of the Needle". The episode's director Winrich Kolbe collaborated with visual effects producer Dan Curry to create the Gothic novel setting through the use of second unit blue screen sequences. In the episode's pre-production meeting, Kolbe and Taylor met with special effects coordinator Dick Brownfield and unit production manager Brad Yacobian to finalize the set design and to clarify the special effects. Their discussion covered minor actions and effects, such as how much rainwater would be coming through an open window, and whether or not the raindrops on Janeway's clothing would disappear when the simulation ended. Kolbe meticulously planned actors' performances in the teaser sequence, such as researching the proper way of pouring and serving tea according to 1840s customs. According to Poe, attention to such small details in the script was common in the production of Star Trek episodes.

According to the script for "Eye of the Needle", the holodeck program occurred in "a drawing room in an English Lord's nineteenth-century manor", the script for "Cathexis" mentions that Janeway's outfit included a crinoline and a corset. The space used for all of the holonovel scenes was dubbed "the Jane Eyre set" by the film crew. The story was compared to Henry James' novella The Turn of the Screw, and Daphne du Maurier's novel Rebecca. It contained elements of mystery, such as "music from a seemingly empty room, a locked fourth-floor door that Davenport/Janeway is forbidden to enter". The implication that the holonovel would end with Davenport's marriage to Lord Burleigh shifted the narrative so that it was "more romantic than gothic".

Construction of the set began on December 5, 1994, on Paramount Stage 16. The set's construction pushed the episode's cost over its budget. This was considered normal for a new series and the next four episodes also exceeded their budgets. Despite the high cost of the manor set, the crew designed it for repeated use over the course of the series. This was more appealing than shooting several sequences of a covered wagon on location in the countryside. Curry took special care to merge the blue-screen effects with Kolbe's footage seamlessly to achieve the effect of the manor transforming back into the holodeck. Curry and Kolbe had worked together on previous projects that required similar special effects.

=== Cast response and abandonment ===
Studio executives and the show's crew were skeptical about Taylor's plans for Janeway Lambda one. Ron Wilkerson, who wrote "Learning Curve" with Jean Louise Matthias, included the holonovel in the script, but was uncertain of the storyline's direction in future episodes. Despite his confusion, Wilkerson said that he trusted Taylor for her "great instincts". "Persistence of Vision", the episode in which the holonovel was the most heavily featured, was initially met with resistance from Paramount Pictures executives. Taylor attempted to include the episode in the show's first season, but the idea was rejected on the basis of its "story and script form." Studio executives felt the episode was a "very soft story" that lacked action or a clear antagonist, and believed it would not hold an audience's attention. While discussing Janeway's fight with Templeton, Seymour said the writers were uncertain of how to further develop her character, and viewed the scene as an example of how "[t]hey got carried away." Seymour said that Janeway killed Templeton in the original draft of the fight scene, but this was removed as "she couldn't do that, because she's never killed anyone."

Poe cited Janeway Lambda one as an example of an idea that "sounded good in theory, ... [that] didn't work out in practice". The storyline was abandoned since everyone disliked it. Taylor reported that fans' lack of interest, and the criticism of Janeway portrayed in the role of a servant or subordinate, resulted in the holonovel being discontinued. Seymour attributed the storyline's removal to the decision to avoid excessive use of the holodeck. Taylor wrote a conclusion for the novel, which was never developed into an episode, and she was disappointed that the narrative was left incomplete. Despite her attachment to the project, she said that she was "never afraid to cut our losses if something wasn't working". The holonovel was replaced by Janeway seeking counsel from a holographic version of Leonardo da Vinci. In her book Star Trek, media studies scholar Ina Rae Hark argued that this decision was taken to make the series more appealing to a male audience.

== Appearances in Star Trek: Voyager ==
Janeway Lambda one is introduced in the teaser sequences of two first-season episodes "Cathexis" and "Learning Curve". In "Cathexis", using her captain's log, Captain Kathryn Janeway (Kate Mulgrew) notes that she has started a new holonovel set in "ancient England" (the show's term to indicate Victorian era Britain) as a way "to get away from being a captain for a while". In the novel, Janeway assumes the role of Lucille Davenport, working for a Lord Burleigh (Michael Cumpsty) as governess of his children Henry (Thomas Dekker) and Beatrice (Lindsey Haun). In the "Cathexis" teaser, the housekeeper, Mrs. Templeton (Carolyn Seymour), views Davenport as a threat to the order of the house. Janeway meets Lord Burleigh, and learns about his wife's death and that the children are struggling to accept it. After Burleigh forbids Janeway from entering the manor's fourth floor, Ensign Harry Kim (Garrett Wang) interrupts the holonovel to inform the captain that Commander Chakotay (Robert Beltran) and Commander Tuvok (Tim Russ) are not responding to their messages while returning from a mission. Janeway leaves the holonovel for the rest of the episode to attend to matters on the ship.

In the teaser sequence for "Learning Curve", Janeway introduces herself to Henry and Beatrice. She plans to teach mathematics and science to Henry, and attempts to discern Beatrice's interests. Beatrice claims that her mother is not dead, and that she saw her the previous night and gave her a sampler. The holonovel is interrupted after a disruption of power to an energy grid, causing Janeway to spend the rest of the episode investigating its cause. Janeway Lambda one plays a larger role in the second-season episode "Persistence of Vision". Janeway is shown to be stressed and agitated, and the Doctor (Robert Picardo) suggests that she return to the holodeck program to relax. When Janeway resumes her role as Davenport, Lord Burleigh confesses his love for her and kisses her. Janeway confronts him about the mysterious occurrences in the house, her ban from the fourth floor, and Beatrice's assertion that her mother is still alive. Chakotay interrupts Janeway to inform her that a representative of the Bothans has approached the ship. Over the course of the episode, Janeway sees elements of the holonovel appear outside the holodeck, and she begins to question her sanity. She is taunted by multiple appearances of Beatrice and is later attacked by Templeton. At the end of the episode, her visions are explained to be the result of hallucinations caused by a bio-electric energy field from the Bothan ship. Following her experiences with the Bothans, Janeway decides to take a break from fantasy and the holodeck.

== Thematic analysis ==
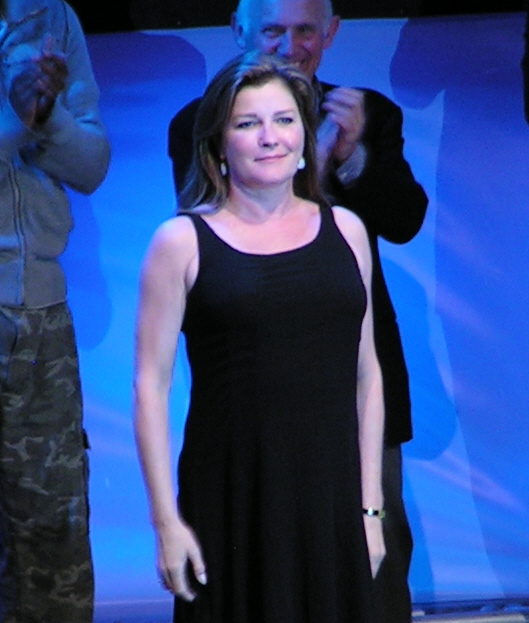
Analysis of Janeway Lambda one revolved around its representation of Captain Kathryn Janeway, played by Kate Mulgrew (pictured in 2007).

Taylor developed Janeway Lambda one as a space for Janeway to experience a life separate from the responsibilities of being a captain. She said Janeway focused more on using the holodeck to care for a family rather than satisfy "an intellectual curiosity about a period of history". Commentators have contrasted the holonovel with other characters' use of the holodeck. Academic Janet Horowitz Murray cited Janeway's appreciation of the gothic novel with Captain Jean-Luc Picard's (Patrick Stewart)'s interest in film noir, Lieutenant Commander Data's (Brent Spiner) identification with Sherlock Holmes, and Dr. Julian Bashir's (Alexander Siddig) preference for James Bond. Murray wrote that unlike the men who find enjoyment in "violent conflict[s] that [are] resolved within a single Star Trek episode", Janeway immerses herself in domestic chores without pursuing a narrative with constant action. A. Bowdoin Van Riper, a historian specializing in modern science and technology, wrote that Janeway Lambda one was the only time a holonovel used by a woman was shown on screen, and identified Janeway as "the only Starfleet officer whose fantasies are of home, hearth, and children".

Taylor attributed the holonovel, specifically in "Persistence of Vision", as allowing Janeway to move forward from her engagement to her fiancée Mark Johnson (Stan Iver). In regards to Janeway's personal life, Taylor said: "We cannot put her into romantic situations until she decides he has given her up for dead and moved on, and the only wise thing for her to do is the same". Van Riper cited Janeway as part of a trend in which fictional female captains "recreate home and hearth on the high seas by forming (and maintaining) committed romantic relationships". Murray interpreted her romance with the fictional Lord Burleigh as a serious "exercise posing psychological and moral questions" for the audience and characters to explore during the episodes. She likened Janeway with the character Jane Eyre based on their "strong resistance to being bullied, a willingness to stand on principle, and the courage to face fear and isolation head-on". Referring to Janeway as a "person of Victorian integrity", Murray described the holonovel as opening a channel of exploration that brings her the "benefit of self-knowledge" in order to return her to "the real world all the stronger".

== Critical reception ==
Janeway Lambda one was panned by television critics. The A.V. Club's Brandon Nowalk viewed Janeway's holonovel as unsuccessful, and called Lord Burleigh a "holographic Irish bodice-ripper stereotype". In his book A Critical History of Doctor Who on Television, John Kenneth Muir compared the show's allusions to Jane Eyre to those shown on the British science fiction television series Doctor Who. Muir criticized the holonovel as "essentially a time-waster" that "serves no dramatic or character purpose except to enlighten the viewer that Janeway likes Victorian novels". While Muir praised Doctor Who for immersing its characters in the Victorian time period, he felt that the Davenport narrative was kept separate from the rest of the narrative and characters. Io9's James Whitbrook ranked Janeway Lambda one as number nine on its list of recurring Star Trek holodeck programs, and described it as "dull as dishwater".

Critics were divided on how the holonovel fit into Janeway's role as a female captain. Whitbrook considered the subplot to be an excuse to portray Mulgrew out of her Starfleet uniform. TrekToday's Michelle Erica Green dismissed the holonovel as a failed assertion that Janeway was "not just a captain, she's a WOMAN!", writing that it invoked "all sorts of ugly cliches about how women secretly want to be swept off their feet by men who consider themselves their superiors". She criticized Janeway's investment in the holonovel over leading her crew, and questioned her portrayal in the show's early seasons as "isolating herself on the holodeck and holding junior officers at arm's length". In response to a fan's criticism that Janeway was too busy "prancing around in frilly dresses on the holodeck" to be an effective captain, Tor.com's Sara Eileen Haines responded: "Wait, Janeway wears frilly dresses? Wait, you mean Janeway was a girl under that uniform?" American studies professor Katja Kanzler interpreted the holonovel as the show's way of adding "ultra-traditional images of femininity" to its "ultra-authoritative female Captain". Kanzler recommended that Janeway should be seen a "work-in-progress" and a "project in which authors test and playfully combine different narratives of gender, power and social interaction".

The show's expansion of the holodeck technology received negative feedback. National Review's Jonah Goldberg wrote that the frequent use of the holodeck was "an outrage, seemingly conceived for actors and costume designers to indulge themselves at the audience's expense". Nowalk described the various appearances of the holodeck in Voyager as representing how the writers were "fascinated with, concerned by, and curious about virtual reality in the early days of the Internet". Murray expanded on theoretical physicist Lawrence M. Krauss's determination that creating tactile simulations through the holodeck is an example of unrealistic technology to write that Janeway would have been unable to drink tea and hug Lord Burleigh in reality. Green was critical of how the holodeck technology was written as a means for "personal gratification" rather than as a space to further develop a skill or hobby.
