= William Blinn =

American screenwriter (1937–2020)

- Born: William Frederick Blinn; July 21, 1937; Toledo, Ohio, United States
- Died: October 22, 2020 (aged 83); Burbank, California, United States
- Occupations: Screenwriter, television producer

William Frederick Blinn (July 21, 1937 – October 22, 2020) was an American screenwriter and television producer.

== Life and career ==
Blinn was born in Toledo, Ohio, the son of Clare Allen and Pearl Ariel (Schaeffer) Blinn. Blinn began his career in television in the 1960s. As a screenwriter, Blinn wrote episodes of Rawhide, Gunsmoke, The Rookies, Here Come the Brides, and Shane (where he was also story editor), and Fame (where he also served as executive producer). In 1971, Blinn wrote the screenplay for the television movie Brian's Song for which he won an Emmy and Peabody Award. He won a second Emmy in 1977 for his work on the miniseries Roots. Blinn also created two series for producing mogul Aaron Spelling: Starsky & Hutch (Blinn later produced the 2004 film of the same name); and the less-successful Heaven Help Us, which co-starred Ricardo Montalbán, known for his role in Fantasy Island. He was the executive producer of the 1974 ABC series The New Land, and he created the short-lived 1977 CBS espionage series Hunter and wrote its unaired 1976 pilot. He was also a writer for the 1996 Hallmark Television film The Boys Next Door based on the play of the same name. His other series were Eight Is Enough, Our House and Fame.

In addition to screenwriting (which includes Purple Rain), Blinn also produced several television series and television movies including Aaron's Way, Polly: Comin' Home!, and Pensacola: Wings of Gold. In 1977, he formed a partnership with Jerry Thorpe, along with Viacom and ABC to develop its own television properties.

== Death ==
Blinn died on October 22, 2020, from natural causes at a retirement home in Burbank, California.

== Awards and nominations ==
Year	Award	Result	Category	Film or series
1972	Emmy Award	Won	Outstanding Writing Achievement in Drama - Adaptation	Brian's Song
1977	Emmy Award	Won	Outstanding Writing in a Drama Series	Roots (Shared with Ernest Kinoy)
1982	Emmy Award	Nominated	Outstanding Drama Series	Fame (Shared with Gerald I. Isenberg, Stan Rogow, and Mel Swope)
1983	Emmy Award	Nominated	Outstanding Drama Series	Fame (Shared with Mel Swope)
1984	Emmy Award	Nominated	Outstanding Drama Series	Fame (Shared with Ken Ehrlich)
1977	Humanitas Prize	Won	60 Minute Category	Roots (Shared with James Lee for episode #4)
1996	Humanitas Prize	Nominated	90 Minute Category	The Boys Next Door
1972	Peabody Awards	Won	-	Brian's Song
1997	Writers Guild of America Award	Won	Adapted Long Form	The Boys Next Door
