= Tom Griffin (playwright) =

American playwright (1946–2018)

Thomas E. Griffin Jr. (February 14, 1946 – March 20, 2018) was a playwright, best known for The Boys Next Door. Other plays include Amateurs, Pasta, and Mrs. Sedgewick's Head.

== Career ==
Griffin was born in Providence, Rhode Island and grew up there and in Warwick, Rhode Island. He graduated with a B.A. in theater from the University of Rhode Island in 1969. He then acted with Trinity Repertory Company in Providence, and taught playwriting at the University of Rhode Island.

His play The Taking Away of Little Willie was performed at the 1979 Mark Taper Forum Playworks Festival, and then at Theatre Three in Dallas. The characters were a child with disability, "a caring, self-sacrificing mother", "an intelligent, bitter father" and "a self-appointed community guardian". A reviewer in Dallas wrote, "The development is predictable here and there, but the play nonetheless crackles with tension." In 1980, Griffin's play Einstein and the Polar Bear was selected for the National Playwrights Conference. The main characters are a reclusive novelist living in a small New England town and a woman from Manhattan who arrives claiming that her car has broken down. It was picked up by Mark Lamos for the Hartford Stage Company, and then transferred to the Cort Theater on Broadway. Reviewers were highly critical, particularly about what they considered "achingly artificial dialogue", and the play closed after four performances.
