= Heroes and Demons =

- Star Trek: Voyager episode
- Episode no.: Season 1 Episode 12
- Directed by: Les Landau
- Written by: Naren Shankar
- Production code: 112
- Original air date: April 24, 1995

Guest appearances
- Michael Keenan – Hrothgar; Marjorie Monaghan – Freya; Christopher Neame – Unferth

Episode chronology
← Previous "State of Flux"	Next → "Cathexis"
- Star Trek: Voyager season 1

"Heroes and Demons" is the twelfth episode of the first season of the American science fiction television series Star Trek: Voyager. The episode first aired April 24, 1995 on UPN. It was directed by Les Landau and written by former Star Trek: The Next Generation story editor Naren Shankar. Set in the 24th century, the series follows the adventures of the Starfleet and Maquis crew of the starship USS Voyager after they were stranded in the Delta Quadrant far from the rest of the Federation. In this episode, after a sample of a protostar is brought on board, crewmen start to vanish from a holodeck simulation of Beowulf. The Doctor (Robert Picardo), a hologram, investigates and finds that a lifeform was transported to the ship alongside the sample. It escaped to the holodeck where it was converting those who entered into energy. The Doctor has the samples brought to the holodeck and released, resulting in the lifeform returning the crewmen to their corporeal states.

Shankar sought to move the Doctor out of sickbay, and while he was looking generally to involve Vikings on the holodeck, it wasn't until later that he realized he had inadvertently followed the story of the Beowulf poem, and so changed the script to include direct references. Composer Dennis McCarthy sought to increase the tempo of the music used in this episode, and included an unused piece written for The Next Generation episode "Qpid"; he was nominated for Outstanding Music Composition at the Emmy Awards for his work on "Heroes and Demons". A further nomination at those awards was received by Marvin V. Rush for Individual Achievement in Cinematography for a Series. Picardo's performance was praised by the crew, and the episode was received positively by critics, who compared elements to The Lord of the Rings and computer based roleplaying games. It received Nielsen ratings of 6.4/11 percent.

== Plot ==
The crew encounters a protostar and Captain Kathryn Janeway (Kate Mulgrew) decides to have samples beamed aboard for use as a potential power source. A problem occurs when beaming the samples to Voyager. Janeway recommends to B'Elanna Torres (Roxann Dawson) that she should have Ensign Harry Kim's (Garrett Wang) assistance, but he is discovered to be missing. The crew finds his holodeck program, based on the epic poem Beowulf, still running. With each person sent into the holodeck also becoming lost, Captain Janeway sends in the Doctor (Robert Picardo) to investigate, under the assumption that as an immaterial hologram, he cannot be dematerialized in the way the missing crew had been. The Doctor shows signs of nervousness when preparing for his first "away" mission, so Kes (Jennifer Lien) encourages him to take a name to embolden him with having an identity of his own. He states that he has narrowed his choices to three but does not reveal them.

Once in the holodeck, the Doctor meets Freya (Marjorie Monaghan), a shieldmaiden, and introduces himself as "Schweitzer". She takes him to the hall, where he is made to prove himself before the others, and after a celebratory meal and everyone has retired to separate rooms, she reappears and suggests that, in the cold of the night when the fire in his hearth has gone out, he ought to join her. Though he dismisses her advances, he relaxes his inhibition in later scenes. Later they are confronted by Unferth (Christopher Neame), who kills Freya. She dies in Schweitzer's arms. With her last words she speaks his name.

As the Doctor investigates, he realizes that alien energy lifeforms were beamed onto the ship within the containment field into which the protostar samples were transported. The missing crew members have been converted to energy by the lifeforms from the protostar, presumably as hostages in retaliation for Voyager's actions. The Doctor releases one of the energy lifeforms on the holodeck; in kind, the missing crew are returned to their original forms. Afterwards, upon reflection, the Doctor decides not to keep the name Schweitzer, as his memories associated with it are too painful.

== Production ==
=== Writing ===
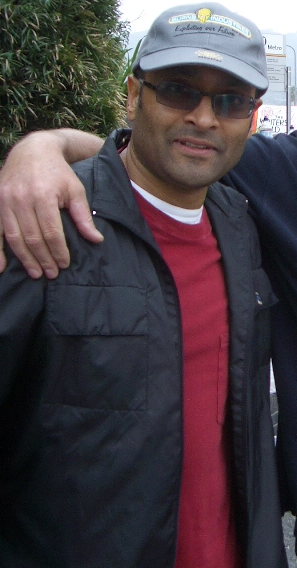
Naren Shankar had worked on Star Trek: The Next Generation before writing "Heroes and Demons"

Rick Berman, Jeri Taylor and Michael Piller had worked together as executive producers for the pilot of Voyager, "Caretaker", and the following ten episodes. "Heroes and Demons" was the first episode where Piller wasn't involved in the writing of the scripts because he had begun work on the series Legend. Instead, the episode was written by Naren Shankar, the former story editor for Star Trek: The Next Generation during the final two seasons of the show where he worked with Berman, Taylor and Piller. Following the end of The Next Generation, Shankar had pitched a number of spec scripts for a variety of television series including The Simpsons, but "Heroes and Demons" was the first one he sold, which was accepted before Voyager had begun production.

The initial idea for the episode had come from a conversation between Shankar and Brannon Braga over dinner in which they sought to move the Doctor from sickbay into the holodeck, marking this episode as the first one in which the Doctor had left sickbay. Shankar had originally intended the story to be "Star Trek with Vikings", and it wasn't until he was sketching out the plot of the episode that he realised that he had inadvertently created something similar to the Beowulf poem. He deliberately worked direct references in the poem into the script for the episode, such as specific lines and the attack on the mead hall. His significant change from Beowulf was the addition of the character, Freya.

The script went through two drafting stages, with the main issue being the alien element rather than the Viking details. Shankar was pleased that the work he did on the Viking parts of the script went unchanged from the first draft to the screen, calling it his "best experience" as a writer. He also chose the first name that the Doctor would attempt to use, selecting Albert Schweitzer from a list of scientists and doctors because he thought the surname sounded funny. He expected that it would be cut or changed, based on his experience in writing humorous elements into scripts for The Next Generation. He wrote several lighthearted scenes into the script and was pleased when none of them were cut, saying that he was particularly proud of the exchange between the Doctor and Freya where she says "Your people must value you highly", and the Doctor responds dryly, "You would think so." He submitted his final version of the script on February 2, 1995. Taylor later talked about the use of the holodeck as a plot device in this episode, saying that it allowed the series to show things that otherwise couldn't happen on the show. She added that the plot in this episode "transcended the idea of 'Oh, we're in trouble on the holodeck.'"

=== Guest stars, set design and musical composition ===
Guest star Christopher Neame had previously appeared on The Next Generation in the seventh season episode "Sub Rosa". After his performance in "Heroes and Demons", he would go on to appear in the Star Trek: Deep Space Nine sixth season episode "Statistical Probabilities". Marjorie Monaghan later appeared in Babylon 5 in the recurring role of Number One/Theresa Halloran from the episode "Lines of Communication" onwards. During the filming of "Heroes and Demons", Monaghan's stunt double was Patricia Tallman. The duo went on to work together on Babylon 5 with Tallman playing the character of Lyta Alexander. They didn't initially recognise each other on the later show because of the costumes they wore in the Voyager episode. Monaghan was also considered for the main cast part of T'Pol in Star Trek: Enterprise.

The forest set was constructed on stage 12 at the Paramount Studios lot, and was designed by production designer Richard James. Backdrops were used to expand the depth of the stage. Marvin V. Rush later explained that they were not aiming for a real world forest look to the scenes, as the story allowed them to aim for something in the "in mythology and in historical record" instead. He attributed this for why the scenery design and creation was successful. Director Les Landau also found that it enabled him to use some different camera angles in "Heroes and Demons", including shooting from a crane and the use of close-focus lenses to enable some wide shooting to get a sense of depth.

Composer Dennis McCarthy had worked on the Star Trek franchise since the pilot episode of The Next Generation, and has included such work as the music for the film Star Trek Generations and the theme to Deep Space Nine. "Heroes and Demons" was significant for McCarthy, as he had sought to increase the tempo of the music he created over the course of several years with the addition of further percussion instruments. He had one piece which was written for The Next Generation episode "Qpid" which he wanted to use but had never managed to include it in an episode. This was finally used in "Heroes and Demons", and he submitted that work for consideration at the Emmy Awards.

== Reception ==
=== Ratings ===
"Heroes and Demons" was first broadcast on April 24, 1995, on the UPN network. According to the Nielsen ratings, it received a 6.4/11 share, meaning it was watched by 6.4 percent of all households and 11 percent of all households watching television at the time of broadcast. This placed it as the 74th highest rated broadcast of the week across all networks. At the time of broadcast, this was the lowest rated episode of the series so far but received the same ratings as the following episode "Cathexis" and higher than the final two episodes, "Jetrel" and "Learning Curve".

=== Cast and crew response ===
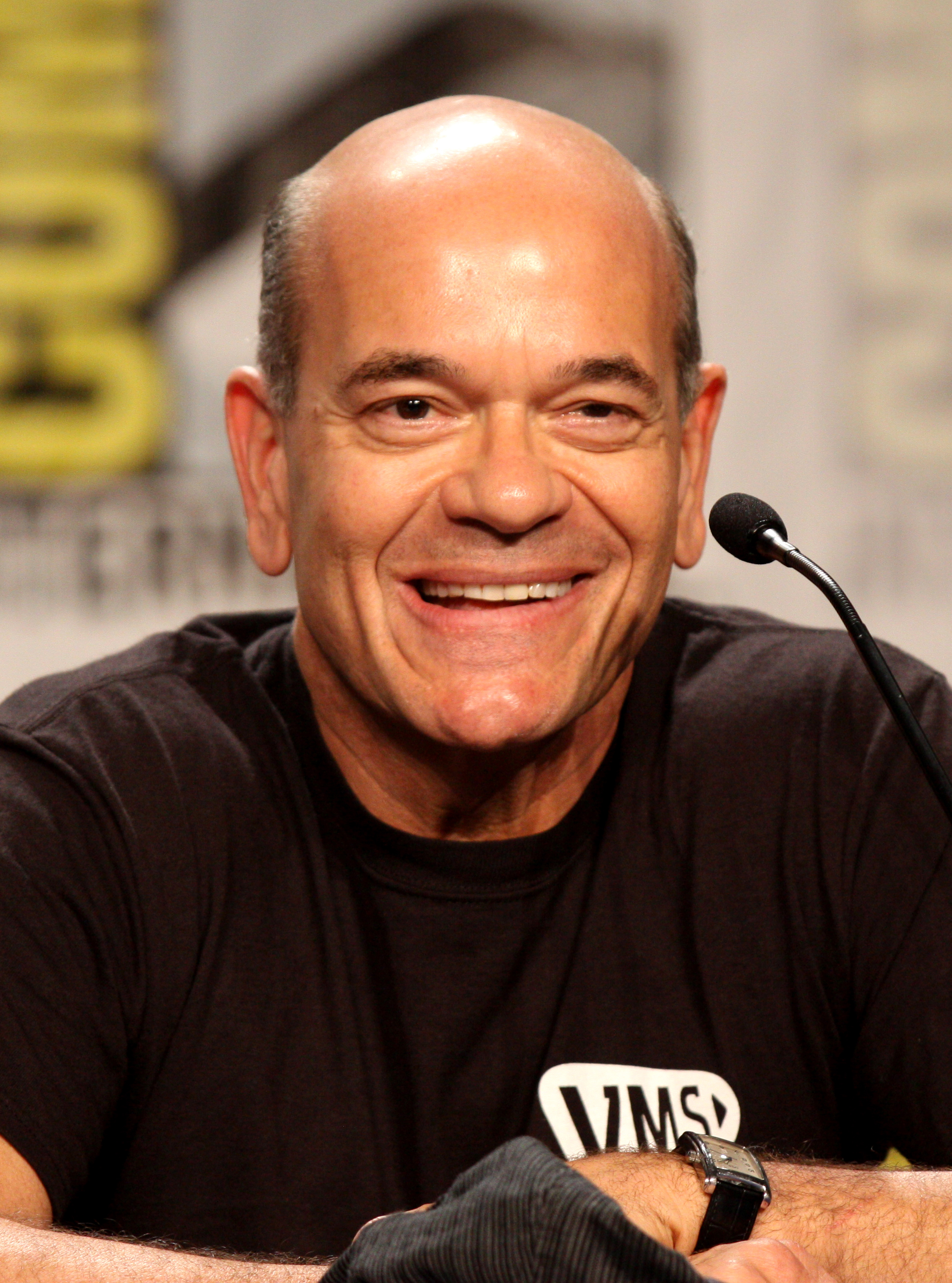
Several members of the crew praised the work of Robert Picardo in "Heroes and Demons".

Writer Naren Shankar was happy with the overall episode, saying "I think all the Viking scenes worked very well. The sets were magnificent—the forest set was beautiful, and I don't really have any complaints about it. Everybody really outdid themselves on it." Supervising producer David Livingston praised the prop and wardrobe departments for creating the array of "cool-looking" extras, while Michael Piller said that the whole episode was "well produced". Taylor praised the premise, calling the idea "irresistible" and the overall episode "delightful".

Members of the crew praised the work of Robert Picardo on this episode, with Taylor saying that he was "wonderful" in "Heroes and Demons", while Piller saw the character as a "fish out of water" and added that "Picardo is a wonderful actor." Kenneth Biller, executive story editor, felt that the episode gave Picardo a "chance to shine", and that the episode was "a lot of fun". Picardo himself was pleased with the episode, later describing it as his favourite of the first season. Garrett Wang also added that he was happy with the episode, as being an Asian-American actor he didn't otherwise get a great deal of chances to appear in period work, and he enjoyed the wardrobe he wore.

=== Critical response ===
In his chapter, "From Anglo-Saxon to Angelina: Adapting Beowulf for Film", in Medieval Afterlives in Contemporary Culture, Stewart Brooks compared "Heroes and Demons" to the Beowulf story. He said that certain elements of the episode were more similar to the roleplaying game Dungeons & Dragons instead of historical fact, such as the character of Freya who he also compared to Éowyn from J. R. R. Tolkien's The Lord of the Rings. He praised the episode, saying that the "real pleasures" were "to witness the surly, introverted, neurotic Doctor being forced to play the hero, banter with Vikings and have his first romantic liaison when Freya falls for him." In 2011, Brian J. Robb also linked the episode to roleplaying games in his article on the episode for Star Trek Monthly, suggesting that the repetition of some scenes may have been influenced by the increase in popularity of computer based roleplaying games at the time of production.

Edward L. Risden described "Heroes and Demons" as "Pulp TV tackles mead-hall ritual" in his book, co-authored with Nickolas Haydock, Beowulf on Film: Adaptations and Variations. He added that it gave the Beowulf story "a new twist adaptive to science fiction and to audiences who want human interest even in electronic projections." Michelle Erica Green, while reviewing the episode for TrekToday, said that the plot was "pretty superficial" and the science was "pretty nonsensical". But she said that it was a "delightful outing for the Doctor" and demonstrated the potential for the character.

In 2023 Screen Rant called the episode "truly great" but said that the episode "was not able to capture audience attention or acclaim as well as later seasons did."

Marvin V. Rush was nominated for Individual Achievement in Cinematography for a Series at the 47th Primetime Emmy Awards for his work in this episode, but the award went to Tim Suhrstedt for his work on "Over the Rainbow", an episode of Chicago Hope. At the same ceremony, Dennis McCarthy was also nominated for an Emmy in the category of Outstanding Music Composition for his work on "Heroes and Demons".

== Home media release ==
The first home media release of "Heroes and Demons" was on VHS cassette in the UK. The releases featured two episodes per tape, with this episode appearing alongside "State of Flux" in 1995. It was subsequently released by itself on VHS in the United States July 11, 2000. The first DVD release was in the United States, as part of the first season box set on February 24, 2004. A similar release followed in the UK on May 3, 2004.
