= The Turn of the Screw (play) =

Play by Jeffrey Hatcher

- Original language: English
- Written by: Jeffrey Hatcher
- Based on: The Turn of the Screw by Henry James
- Genre: Ghost story

Premiere
- Date: January 11, 1996
- Place: Portland Stage Company

The Turn of the Screw is a theatrical adaptation by Jeffrey Hatcher of the 1898 novella of the same name by Henry James. Hatcher developed the adaptation with the Portland Stage Company as part of its Little Festival of the Unexpected program in 1995, and it debuted at the company's home theater in Portland, Maine on January 11, 1996. In 1999, the play was staged Off-Broadway by the Primary Stages company. Director Melia Bensussen won an Obie Award for the Primary Stages production.

== Cast and characters ==
The play is performed with two actors. One portrays "The Woman" (the equivalent of the governess in the novella), while the other actor plays all the other characters. The cast from the Portland Stage premier production and the Primary Stages Off-Broadway production are given below:

Opening night cast
Character	Premier cast	Off-Broadway cast
The Man	Joey L. Golden	Rocco Sisto
The Woman	Susan Appel	Enid Graham

== Reception ==
In Variety, theatre critic Charles Isherwood said the Primary Stages production was "disappointingly unsubtle, unsuspenseful and altogether ineffectual", although he credited Bensussen's direction and other production elements for trying to make up for shortcomings in the script. The production also received negative reviews in The New York Times and the New York Post.
