= Darko Tresnjak =

American theatre and opera director

- Born: Zemun, Serbia
- Occupations: Theatre director, theatrical producer
- Awards: 2014 Tony Award for Best Direction of a Musical for A Gentleman's Guide to Love and Murder

Darko Tresnjak (Serbian Cyrillic: Дарко Трешњак, romanized: Darko Trešnjak) is a director of plays, musicals, and opera, and winner of several awards, including the Tony Award. He was the artistic director of the Hartford Stage in Connecticut, United States.

== Early life and education ==
Tresnjak is of Serbian heritage. Tresnjak and his mother moved from Zemun, Yugoslavia (modern-day Serbia) to Maryland in 1976.

He graduated from Swarthmore College, became a US citizen, and received a master of fine arts degree from Columbia University.

== Career ==
Around 2000 he wrote Princess Turandot, inspired by Carlo Gozzi's play written in 1762 (upon which Puccini's opera Turandot was based). Tresnjak's play was performed by the Blue Light Theater Company in New York City in December 2000.

He served as resident artistic director at Old Globe Theatre in San Diego, California, in 2009, and directed for eight summers at the Williamstown Theatre Festival in Massachusetts.

He was the artistic director at Hartford Stage in Hartford, Connecticut from the 2011–2012 season through the 2018–2019 season, where he commissioned The Man in the Case with Mikhail Baryshnikov and directed Kevin Bacon in Rear Window. He left the Hartford Stage for freelance work in June 2019, and was succeeded by Melia Bensussen.

He directed two productions on Broadway: A Gentleman's Guide to Love and Murder in 2013 and Anastasia in 2017.

He directed the Theatre for a New Audience production of Eugène Ionesco's The Killer in 2014 at the Polonsky Shakespeare Center, New York City.

== Awards ==
- 2014: Tony Award for Direction of a Musical; and the Drama Desk Award, Outstanding Director of a Musical, for A Gentleman's Guide to Love and Murder.
- 2015: Obie Award for direction of The Killer.

== Productions ==
=== Hartford Stage productions ===
Tresnjak's productions at Hartford Stage have included:

- Heartbreak House
- The Comedy of Errors
- Anastasia (which transferred to the Broadhurst Theatre on Broadway)
- Romeo and Juliet
- Rear Window
- Kiss Me, Kate
- Private Lives
- Hamlet
- Macbeth
- La Dispute
- Twelfth Night
- Breath and Imagination
- A Gentleman's Guide to Love and Murder (which transferred to the Walter Kerr Theatre on Broadway)
- The Tempest
- Bell, Book and Candle

=== Other theater and opera ===
- Samson et Dalila for The Metropolitan Opera (2018)
- Macbeth for Los Angeles Opera (2016)
- The Ghosts of Versailles for Los Angeles Opera (2015)
- The Killer for Theatre for a New Audience, New York City (2014)
- Der Zwerg for Los Angeles Opera (2011)
- Der Zerbrochene Krug for Los Angeles Opera (2008)
- City of Angels for Goodspeed Musicals (2011)
- Titus Andronicus for Stratford Shakespeare Festival (2011)
- The Merchant of Venice for Theatre for a New Audience and Complete Works (RSC festival)
- Amadeus for Pasadena Playhouse (2026)
