= Melia Bensussen =

American theatre director

- Born: September 18, 1962 (age 63); New York City, US
- Education: Brown University (BA)
- Occupation: Theatre director
- Employer: Hartford Stage
- Predecessor: Darko Tresnjak
- Awards: OBIE Award
- Website: meliabensussen.com

Melia Bensussen (born September 18, 1962) is an American theatre director and producer who has been artistic director of the Hartford Stage since 2019. She is also the Artistic Director of the National Playwrights Conference at the Eugene O'neill Theater Center. She won an OBIE Award for Outstanding Direction for Turn of the Screw in 1999 and is Professor of Performing Arts at Emerson College.

== Biography ==
Born in New York City of Jewish heritage and raised in Mexico City and San Diego, California, Bensussen is a graduate of La Jolla High School and of Brown University, where she received a Bachelor of Arts degree in theatre and comparative literature. She studied Yiddish theatre on a fellowship to Israel and taught English in Japan before returning to New York City to work as a translator and actor. Her first professional job was at the Hartford Stage, assisting the director Emily Mann (director) as a fellow of The Drama League Directors' Project in a production of A Doll's House featuring Mark Lamos in 1986. Fluent in Spanish, she directed for the Puerto Rican Traveling Theater and served as associate director for the Festival Latino at The Public Theater. Her edition of the Langston Hughes translation of Federico García Lorca's Blood Wedding is in its ninth printing by Theatre Communications Group. Bensussen won an OBIE Award for directing Turn of the Screw in 1999.

In 2000, Emerson College hired Bensussen as producing director of Emerson Stage and as professor of performing arts. She chaired the department from 2008 to 2018 and is a full professor. Bensussen has directed theatrical productions at Huntington Theatre, Merrimack Repertory Theatre, Baltimore Center Stage, Hartford Stage, Oregon Shakespeare Festival, La Jolla Playhouse, Shakespeare in the Park, MCC Theater, Primary Stages, Long Wharf Theatre, Actors Theatre of Louisville, People's Light and Theatre Company, San Jose Repertory Theatre, Eugene O'Neill Theater Center, and other venues. She has twice received Directing Awards from the Princess Grace Foundation-USA along with their top honor, the Statuette Award (for Sustained Excellence in Directing). She serves on the executive board of the Stage Directors and Choreographers Society and chairs the Arts Advisory Board for the Princess Grace Foundation.

In January 2019, she was selected to succeed Darko Tresnjak as artistic director of the Hartford Stage. She became the Stage's sixth artistic director and first woman to lead the artistic side of the house. She started in June 2019. The board of directors admired her "passion for reinterpreting classics and directing new plays, her broad and extensive experience at regional theatres across the country, her well-honed skill set as an artistic administrator in academia, and her commitment to advancing the theatre's community engagement initiatives and education programs."

== Personal life ==
Bensussen is married to Charles Epstein, a geneticist. The couple have two children, Jeremy and Ilana.
