= H.E.L.P. =

American television drama series (1990)

- Created by: Christopher Crowe; Dick Wolf
- Written by: David Black; Dick Wolf
- Directed by: Christopher Crowe; Vern Gillum; Michael Ray Rhodes; E. W. Swackhamer
- Starring: John Mahoney; Wesley Snipes; David Caruso; Tom Bresnahan; Lance Edwards; Marjorie Monaghan; Joe Urla; Fionnula Flanagan
- Theme music composer: Jerry Goldsmith
- Country of origin: United States
- Original language: English
- No. of seasons: 1
- No. of episodes: 6

Production
- Executive producers: Christopher Crowe; Dick Wolf
- Producer: Michael Rauch
- Cinematography: Constantine Makris
- Editors: Mark Newman; Drake Silliman
- Running time: 60 min
- Production companies: ABC Productions; Wolf Films; Christopher Crowe Productions; Universal Television

Original release
- Network: ABC
- Release: March 3 – April 7, 1990

H.E.L.P. is an American television drama series which aired on ABC for one season as a mid-season replacement for Mission: Impossible, which was a replacement for Mr. Belvedere in March 1990. The series was created by Christopher Crowe and Dick Wolf, and starred John Mahoney as Chief Patrick Meacham of the New York City Fire Department. Wesley Snipes played police officer Lou Barton and David Caruso played police officer Frank Sardoni of the NYPD.

The premise of the show was based on an experimental combined emergency services station (the Harlem Eastside Life-saving Program, or HELP) in New York City that co-located the resources of the Fire Department, Police Department and Emergency Medical Services.

The series was canceled after its brief six-episode run. The concept of a show involving all three branches of NYC emergency services was successfully reintroduced nine years later with the 1999 debut of Third Watch, which ran for six seasons on NBC.

== Cast ==
- John Mahoney as Chief Patrick Meacham
- Tom Bresnahan as Jimmy Ryan
- David Caruso as Off. Frank Sordoni
- Lance Edwards as Mike Pappas
- Kim Flowers as Suki Rodriguez
- Wesley Snipes as Officer Lou Barton
- Fionnula Flanagan as Kathlenn Meacham
- Joe Urla as Officer Larry Alby

== Episodes ==
No.	Title	Directed by	Written by	Original release date
1	"Fire Down Below"	Unknown	Unknown	March 3, 1990
2	"Are You There, Alpha Centauri?"	E.W. Swackhamer	David Black & Scott Shepherd	March 10, 1990
3	"The Children's Hour"	Vern Gillum	Story by : Dick Wolf & David Black; Teleplay by : David Black	March 17, 1990
4	"Steam Heat"	Unknown	Unknown	March 24, 1990
5	"To Everything, There Is a Season"	Unknown	Unknown	March 31, 1990
6	"Undue Force"	Unknown	Unknown	April 7, 1990
