= Marjorie Monaghan =

American actress (born 1964)

- Born: Marjorie Susan Monaghan; March 19, 1964 (age 62); Orange County, California, U.S.
- Education: Miami University
- Occupation: Actress
- Years active: 1990–2005
- Spouse: Grant Rosenberg (m. 2011)
- Website: marjoriemonaghan.com

Marjorie Susan Monaghan (born March 19, 1964) is an American former actress best known for her portrayal of Tessa Halloran (aka Number One) in the television series Babylon 5.

== Early life ==
Monaghan was born in Orange County, California and raised in the Midwest. She is of Irish-Celt ancestry and started acting in high school. She graduated cum laude from Miami University in Ohio, then headed to New York where she obtained her first role as a firefighter in the short-lived 1990 TV series H.E.L.P. created by Dick Wolf.

== Career ==
Monaghan has performed in a number of science fiction television roles, including starring as JoJo Thorson in Space Rangers and starring as Freya in the Star Trek: Voyager episode "Heroes and Demons". In 1999 she appeared in all eight episodes of Rescue 77 as Kathleen Ryan.

Monaghan is best known for her appearances in 7 episodes of Babylon 5 as Number One (Tessa Holloran).

== Personal life ==
Monaghan started dating novelist, producer, and screenwriter Grant Rosenberg in 2001 whom she married on February 2, 2011.

== Filmography ==
=== Film ===
Year	Title	Role	Notes
1990	The Bonfire of the Vanities	Evelyn Moore	
1991	Aftermath: A Test of Love	Erica	TV movie crime thriller
1991	Regarding Henry	Rosie Alvarez	
1992	Nemesis	Jared	
1994	Jack Reed: A Search for Justice	Lorelei Bradley	TV movie crime mystery starring Brian Dennehy
1998	The Warlord: Battle for the Galaxy	Jana	
1998	Sorcerers	Kree	Unfinished animated fantasy film
2005	The Great War of Magellan		Science fiction proof-of-concept pilot short film by Richard Hatch

=== Television ===
Year	Title	Role	Notes
1990	H.E.L.P.	Jean Ballantry	6 episodes (entire run of the series)
1990	Quantum Leap	Edie Landsdale	Episode: "One Strobe Over the Line"
1990	Law & Order	Cathy	Episode: "Prisoner of Love"
1991	Murder, She Wrote	Elaine Franklin	Episode: "Thicker Than Water"
1991	L.A. Law	Amanda Hagen	Episode: "Eli's Gumming"
1993–1994	Space Rangers	JoJo	6 episodes
1995	California Dreams	Coach Hardaway	Episode: "Tiffani's Gold"
1995	Star Trek: Voyager	Freya	Episode: "Heroes and Demons"
1996	Deadly Games	Sharon	Episode: "Dr. Kramer"
1996	The Pretender	Martha Poole	Episode: "Every Picture Tells a Story"
1997	The Sentinel	Elaine Walters	Episode: "Poachers"
1997	JAG	Seaman Alice Tuppany	Episode: "Against All Enemies"
1997–1998	Babylon 5	Number One (Tessa Holloran)	7 episodes
1999	Rescue 77	Kathleen Ryan	8 episodes
1999	Becker	Amanda	Episode: "Imm-Oral Fixations"
2004	Andromeda	Louisa Messereau	2 episodes: "The Dissonant Interval: Part One" "The Dissonant Interval: Part Two"
