= Cathexis (Star Trek: Voyager) =

- Star Trek: Voyager episode
- Episode no.: Season 1 Episode 13
- Directed by: Kim Friedman
- Story by: Brannon Braga; Joe Menosky
- Teleplay by: Brannon Braga
- Production code: 113
- Original air date: May 1, 1995

Guest appearances
- Michael Cumpsty - Lord Burleigh; Brian Markinson - Lt. Peter Durst; Carolyn Seymour - Mrs. Templeton

Episode chronology
← Previous "Heroes and Demons"	Next → "Faces"
- Star Trek: Voyager season 1

"Cathexis" is the thirteenth episode of Star Trek: Voyager. Part of the Star Trek franchise, it features a starship from the United Federation of Planets (aka The Federation) stranded on the other side of the Galaxy that must make its way home as it encounters aliens and various phenomena. On board a mixture of Federation, Maquis, and alien crew members live and work. The episode aired on UPN on May 1, 1995.

This episode had a Nielsen rating of 6.4 when it was aired in 1995.

== Plot ==
The Voyager crew recovers its shuttlecraft containing Commander Chakotay and Chief of Security Tuvok, who had been exploring a nearby dark matter nebula. Tuvok is unconscious, but Chakotay appears to be brain dead, lacking any neural activity. He is put on life support by the Doctor. The shuttlecraft shows evidence of energy weapon attacks. Captain Kathryn Janeway orders Voyager towards the nebula to investigate. B'Elanna Torres, a close friend of Chakotay, uses a Healing Wheel, one of Chakotay's spiritual talismans, hoping to guide Chakotay's spirit to his body.

En route to the nebula, the ship suddenly changes course away from it, though Lieutenant Tom Paris, at the helm, denies making the change. When it happens a second time, apparently at Paris's instigation, he is relieved of duty until the cause of the course changes can be determined. As the crew navigates the nebula, the ship's engines are suddenly deactivated, apparently by Torres, who like Paris has no recollection of doing so. The Doctor discovers a common memory pattern between Paris and Torres at the times they acted, indicating that they were possessed by another entity. Kes states that she has felt the presence of such an entity, and Tuvok offers to perform a mind meld to try to help her identify it. However, the two are soon found unconscious, with Kes in a coma. Unsure of the intentions of the entity, Janeway orders the command codes transferred to the Doctor, who cannot be possessed; however, shortly afterwards, they find the Doctor's program deactivated. At the suggestion of Tuvok, Janeway decides to divide all command codes between herself and him, believing the entity can only possess one of them at a time.

Torres and Paris discover evidence that points to Tuvok being responsible for several of the events. When these come to light, Tuvok reveals that he is possessed by a noncorporeal alien known as the Komar, seeking to bring Voyager's crew to the center of the nebula so that his people can feed on their neural energy; he takes the command crew hostage as he brings the ship about. Suddenly, the warp core is ejected from the ship, halting their progress. Janeway realizes there is a second entity aboard Voyager and Torres confirms that it appears to be Chakotay. The crew overpower the possessed Tuvok and force the Komar entity away from the ship with a magneton pulse.

Though the hostile entity is gone, the ship is deep within the nebula without a safe means to escape. Chakotay, through Neelix, uses the Healing Wheel to show a series of planetoids to be used as guidance to escape the nebula. The crew follow this, and safely leave the nebula after recovering their warp core. Once the Doctor is back on-line, he is able to restore Chakotay's mind to his body and recover Kes from her coma.

== Reception ==
Reviewers Lance Parkin and Mark Jones wrote that the episode was "a pretty standard alien possession story" with a twist provided by Chakotay being one of the "aliens".

Reviewers note that Chakotay's "neural energy" is able to take over various crew to combat the invading aliens. This marks the introduction of the "Komar" aliens, and possession as well as altered perception are noted as common themes within Star Trek going back to the original pilot The Cage (1965/1988).

This is also noted as one of the "Lucy Davenport" episodes, in which Janeway appears as that holonovel character on the holodeck. (see also Janeway Lambda one)

In 2015, a reviewer on the website "Trek Today" wrote an article about the episode and said "Given the relatively thin storyline, I appreciate the directing of "Cathexis", which makes good use of the actors to maintain a haunted house atmosphere."

In 2020, The Digital Fix felt this episode had classic Star Trek plot elements including a "mysterious nebula" and aliens that take over characters, but note season one has multiple episodes with mysterious nebula such as "The Cloud". They conclude, that while it was not the worst episode in the entire series, it was the weakest episode in season one.
