= Kim Flowers =

American actress (active 1983–98)

- Occupation: Actress
- Years active: 1983–1998

Kim Flowers is a former American actress who may be best known for her supporting role, as a member of the mercenary crew, in the film Alien Resurrection, or her main cast role in the brief (six episode) run of the TV series H.E.L.P..

== Personal life ==
Flowers trained as a ballet dancer and has been dancing since she was 3. She retired from acting in 1998.

== Filmography ==
=== Film ===
Year	Title	Role	Notes
1983	Hero	Kim	
1988	Me and Him	Corazon	
1990	Nobody's Perfect	Jackie	
1994	Clear and Present Danger	Restaurant Hostess	
1994	Independence Day	Woman	Short film
1997	Alien Resurrection	Sabra Hillard	
1998	Another Day in Paradise	Bonnie Johnson	
1998	Fear and Loathing in Las Vegas	Lounge Lizard	

=== Television ===
Year	Title	Role	Notes
1987	Crime Story	–	Episode: "Atomic Fallout"
1990	H.E.L.P.	Suki Rodriguez	Main cast
1991	Quantum Leap	Kate Ellroy	Episode: "Nuclear Family"
1996	Shattered Mind	Jane	TV movie
1998	Pensacola: Wings of Gold	Breaker	5 episodes (season 2)
