= Theatre Three (Dallas) =

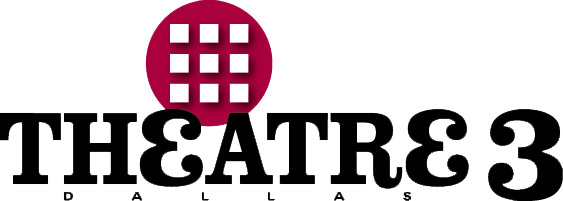
- Theatre 3 logo
- Interactive map of Theatre Three
- Address: 2688 Laclede St, #120; Dallas, Texas; United States
- Coordinates: 32.799269°N 96.803257°W

Construction
- Opened: 1961

Website
- www.theatre3dallas.com

Theatre Three (sometimes styled Theatre3) is a Dallas theatrical company established in 1961 by Norma Young, Jac Alder, Esther Ragland, and Roy Dracup. Originally working from the Sheraton-Dallas Hotel, the theater moved to a location at 2211 Main Street in the Deep Ellum area, eventually settling in The Quadrangle in 1969. Theatre Three has been known as the “second” theater in town, after the Dallas Theater Center (which opened in 1960 — a year before Theatre Three).

It all started in 1960 when a young off-Broadway actress/stage-manager, Norma Young, returned to her home in Dallas in 1960 to care for her ailing mother. It was Norma’s idea to establish the theater in 1961, having received a small inheritance from a great-aunt. And she convinced three others to join her: Esther Ragland, Robert Dracup and Jac Alder, who had met Young when she cast him in a community theater production of Pirandello’s Six Characters In Search of an Author. Their theater started a seven-show season in the Sheraton Dallas Hotel ballroom — and the two married on July 1, 1961.

Theatre Three’s name was chosen because of Young’s belief that for theater to succeed, it required three essential elements: author, actors and audience.

Young was inspired by Margo Jones, Dallas’ original theater patron saint, who championed “theater-in-the-round” when she created Theater ’47, one of the original, residential theater companies in the United States. Young liked the intimacy of the format. More than 50 years after it started, Theater Three remains a theater-in-the-round in its 196-seat space in the Quadrangle.

After its first season, Theatre Three moved into a remodeled car-seat factory on Main Street in Deep Ellum. It may have become a safe, “established” theater in recent decades, but it was actually the city’s first “off-Broadway” theater company. It gave such writers as Harold Pinter, Edward Albee and Samuel Beckett their North Texas premieres.

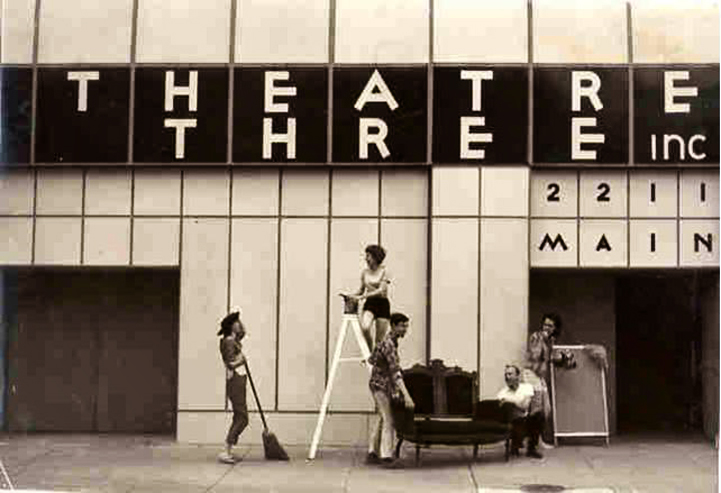
Historical photo of the Deep Ellum location

By 1969, however, it had outgrown that Main Street facility as well. It eventually leased space in what was then a brand-new development, the Quadrangle, in what had been known for decades as the State-Thomas area (named for two streets crossing there). Real-estate developers have since renamed it Uptown. The theatre houses two spaces, the Norma Young Arena Stage and the studio theatre space called Theatre Too.

But by the mid-80s, Theatre Three faced a severe financial crisis. At one point, Alder even called a press conference to declare he would be forced to shut the theater down in a few months. They had no liquidity, no line of credit left, nothing to pay the bills to keep the theater going. He explained that back when there were Texas-based banks — back before the savings-and-loan scandal wiped out many of them or they were bought up by giants like Citibank — he could ask his local banker to let him float the theater for a month or two, to get past a tight cash-flow crunch like this. No more.

Van Kaplan — then the head of Fort Worth’s Casa Manana, now the executive producer of the Pittsburgh Civic Light Opera — advised Alder not to pull the plug. He convinced Alder there were still avenues he could pursue, a lot of goodwill in the community he could tap into. Instead of folding, the theater actually rebounded and — aided by its board and by the Texas real-estate recession that followed a calamitous drop in oil prices — in 1985 Alder actually bought the theater’s home in the Quadrangle.

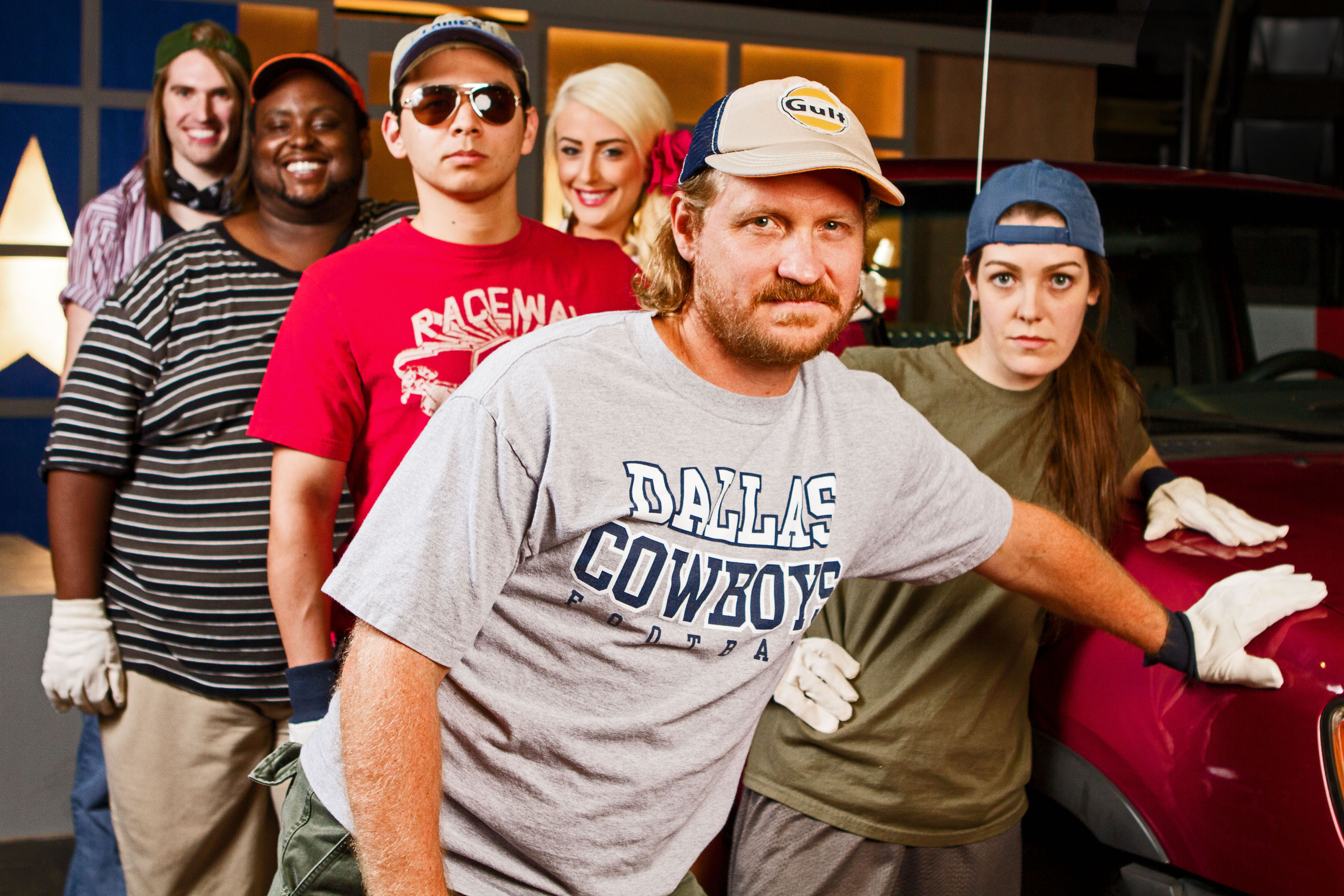
HANDS ON A HARDBODY -A musical by Doug Wright, Amanda Green, and Trey AnastasioL-R (from back): Garret Storms, Major Attaway, Chris Ramirez, Monet Lerner, Ashley Wood, and Molly Welch

Theater Three was desegregated long before many other leading Dallas institutions were. Theatre Three pioneered bringing socially conscious dramas to Dallas by such writers as Athol Fugard and August Wilson. Alder himself served on the Texas Commission on the Arts and was on the board of Texas Non-Profit Theatres.

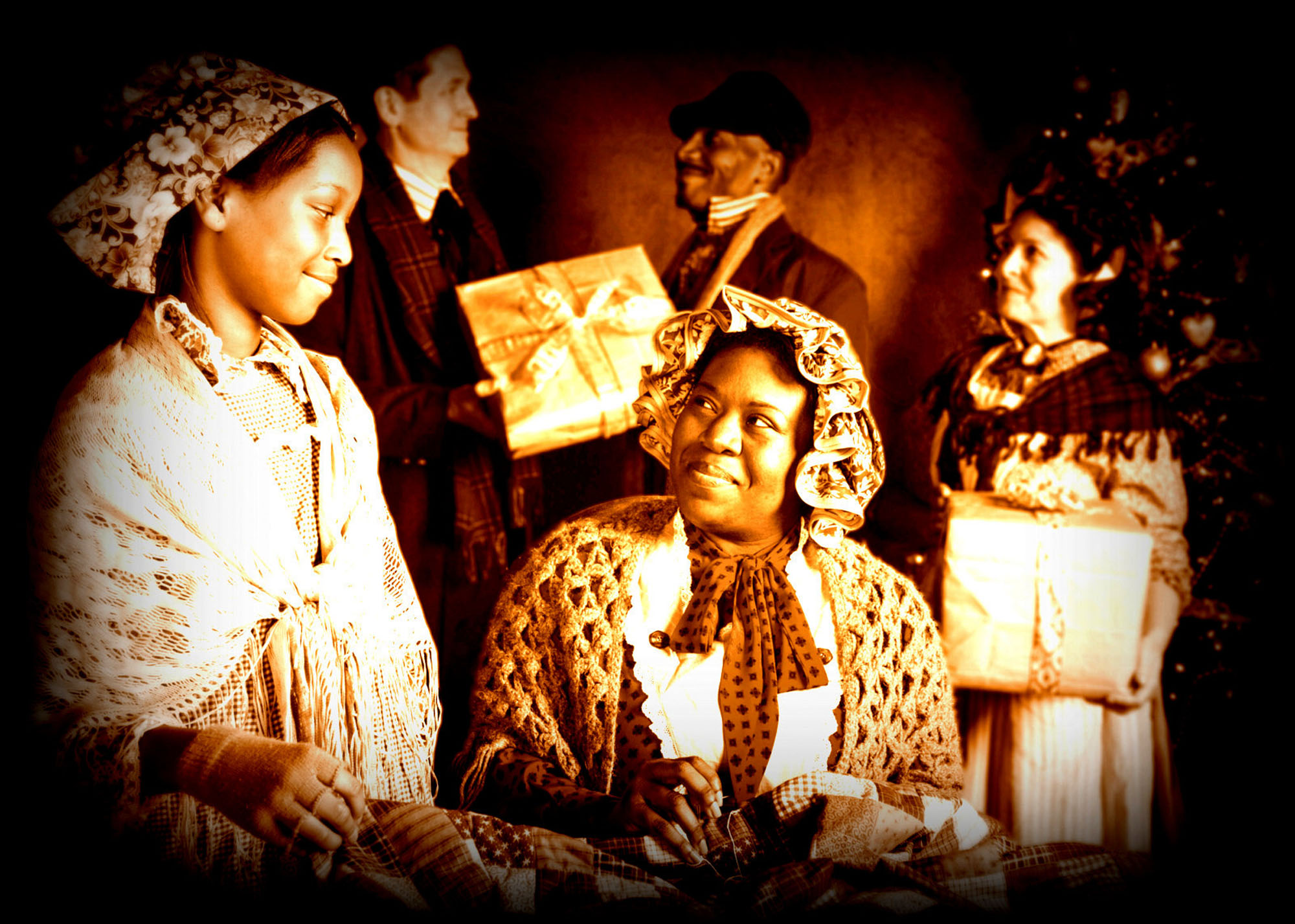
A CIVIL WAR CHRISTMAS - A musical by Paula VogelL-R: Qynetta Caston, Brandi Andrade, Stormi Demerson, Stan Graner, Vontress Mitchell

Theatre Three is also responsible for the longest running show in Dallas theater history, I Love You, You’re Perfect, Now Change, which ran for three years before switching to an annual limited run timed to the Valentine’s Day season.

Until 2003, Theatre Three was the only leading arts organization in the Dallas area that owned its facility — unlike the Dallas Theater Center, Dallas Opera, etc. — all of which receive city support and a city-owned building.

Norma Young continued as the theatre’s founding Artistic Director until her death in 1998. Jac Alder remained with the theatre and continued to serve as the Executive Producer-Director in charge of both artistic and administrative affairs until his death, due to respiratory failure, on May 22, 2015. As of that date, Alder had been the longest-serving artistic director of an American resident theater company in history and in July 2011, he was awarded AEA Life Membership card by Actors’ Equity.

Currently, Theatre Three is led by Artistic Director Jeffrey Schmidt and Managing Director Charlie Beavers.

== Gallery ==
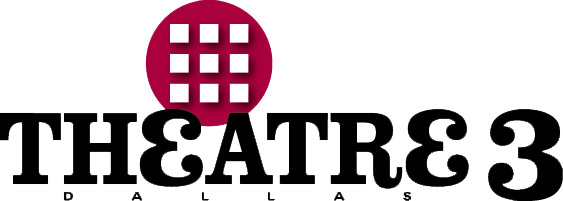
Theatre 3 logo

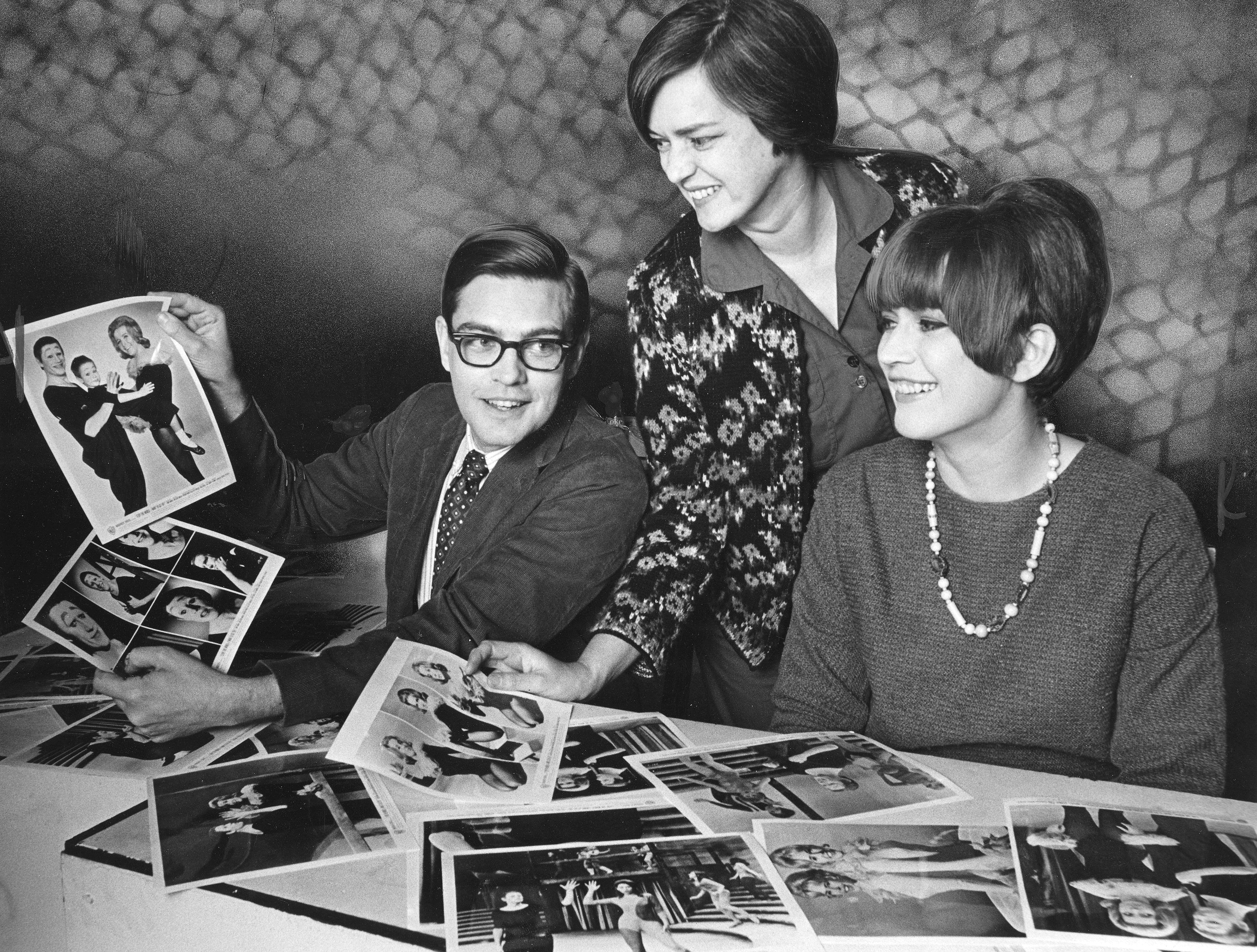
Jac Alder, Norma Young, and Camilla Carr - Stop the World

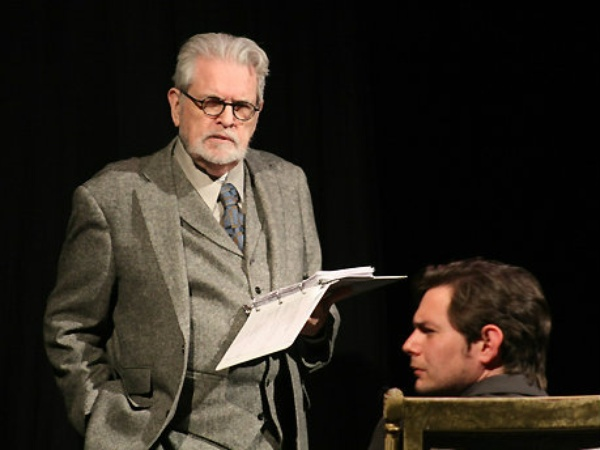
Jac Alder performs
