= Hartford Stage =

American theatre company

- (2026)
- Interactive map of Hartford Stage
- Location: 50 Church Street; Hartford, Connecticut; United States
- Coordinates: 41.76959°N 72.6745°W
- Owner: Hartford Stage Company
- Capacity: 489

Construction
- Opened: 1968
- Architect: Robert Venturi

Website
- hartfordstage.org

Hartford Stage is an American 501(c)(3) non-profit regional theatre company located on Church Street in downtown Hartford, Connecticut. Since its founding in 1963, Hartford Stage has won the Regional Theatre Tony Award (1989) and many Connecticut Critics Circle and other awards.

== History ==
Founded in 1963 by Jacques Cartier, the company performed in a former supermarket until it moved to its current home at the 489-seat John W. Huntington Theatre, designed by Robert Venturi, in 1968. Jacques Cartier (1963–1968), Paul Weidner (1968–1980), Mark Lamos (1981–1998), Michael Wilson (1998–2011), Darko Tresnjak (2011–2019), and Melia Bensussen (2019–present) have served as the Stage's artistic directors.

Hartford Stage has produced over 80 world and North American premieres, including the new musical Anastasia, which enjoyed a two-year run on Broadway; A Gentleman’s Guide to Love and Murder, winner of four 2014 Tony Awards, including Best Musical and Best Direction of a Musical; and Water by the Spoonful, winner of the 2012 Pulitzer Prize for Drama. Kevin Bacon starred in the Stage's adaptation of Rear Window.

Hartford Stage gained national recognition under Lamos, who shook up the theatre's traditional repertoire with bolder contemporary dramas and spectacular productions of Shakespeare and classics such as Peer Gynt and The Greeks, a cycle of ancient Greek dramas. Productions that ended up on Broadway included Marvin's Room, Our Country's Good, Tiny Alice, Tea at Five, The Carpetbagger's Children, and Enchanted April.

Under artistic director Wilson, the Stage reemphasized modern American classics from Tennessee Williams and Amiri Baraka. Tresnjak deepened the Stage's commitment to Shakespeare and new American theatre and successfully launched musical theatre as a new programming priority. Bensussen was hired to enhance the Stage's community engagement and education initiatives and diversify its repertoire.
