= The Boys Next Door (play) =

Play by Tom Griffin

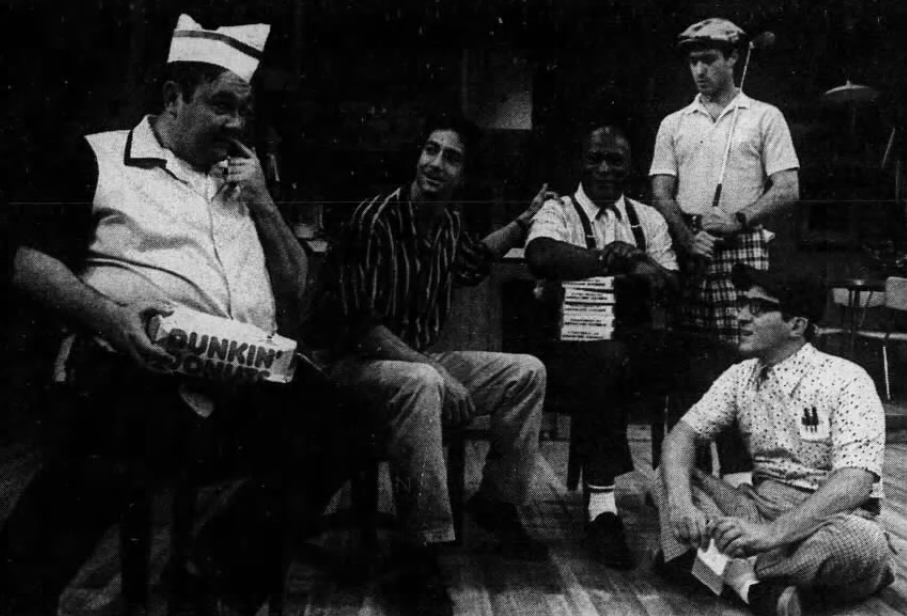
- (From left) David Schramm, David Strathairn, John Amos, Joe Urla and Joe Grifasi in The Boys Next Door, 1987
- Original language: English
- Written by: Tom Griffin
- Setting: New England. A modest two-bedroom apartment in a large apartment complex. The area is suburban.

Premiere
- Date: June 1986
- Place: McCarter Theatre, Princeton, New Jersey

The Boys Next Door is a play by Tom Griffin, first produced in the 1988/89 season. Set in the Boston area, it deals with four men with various mental disabilities who live in a group home. It takes place over roughly a two-month period and consists of brief vignettes about the men's lives. The play provides a humorous commentary on the men's lives, taking a surprising turn as Barry's father comes to visit and as Jack (their caretaker) accepts a new job. It was adapted into a television film in 1996 by Hallmark Entertainment starring Tony Goldwyn, Courtney Vance, Nathan Lane, Robert Sean Leonard, and Mare Winningham.

== Characters ==
- Arnold Wiggins is a man who lives with a mild mental disability and works at a movie theater as a janitor. He tends to be very obsessive-compulsive. He is hyperactive and talks constantly. He is also often abused by coworkers and afraid to fight back. When he becomes angry or scared, Wiggins repeats the word: 'nyеt', meaning no in Russian, and threatens to run away to Russia.
- Norman Bulansky is a middle-aged man with mental disabilities who works at a doughnut shop. Eating doughnuts at his job has caused him to become overweight. His girlfriend, Sheila, lives at another group home. Bulansky is very proud and possessive of a large ring of keys.
- Lucien P. Smith is a large African-American man who faces extremely debilitating mental disorders. Despite the fact that he cannot read, Smith insists on checking out armloads of books from the library. He is at risk of losing his disability funds when the state senate accuses him of faking his mental condition. Smith does not understand what is around him when he goes to the "State Sneck", resulting in a profound scene.
- Barry Klemper is a 28-year-old man with schizophrenia who believes he is a pro golfer. He gets highly agitated over small things. This is partly because Barry has had a traumatic life growing up. Later in the story, when Klemper's abusive father visits him for the first time in years, the situation proves harmful to his mental condition.
- Jack Palmer is the social worker for the four handicapped men. He has found himself increasingly burned out and is thinking about a new line of work. At the end of the play, Palmer leaves the men and becomes a travel agent.
- Sheila is Norman's girlfriend. Like Norman, she faces mental disabilities. She is also obsessed with Norman's prized keys and is "no skinny minnie herself".
- Mr. Klemper is Barry's abusive father. During the course of play, he decides to visit Barry while in the Boston area.
