= Learning Curve (Star Trek: Voyager) =

- Star Trek: Voyager episode
- Episode no.: Season 1 Episode 16
- Directed by: David Livingston
- Written by: Ronald Wilkerson; Jean Louise Matthias
- Production code: 116
- Original air date: May 22, 1995

Guest appearances
- Armand Schultz - Kenneth Dalby; Derek McGrath - Chell; Kenny Morrison - Gerron; Catherine MacNeal - Mariah Henley; Thomas Alexander Dekker - Henry Burleigh; Lindsey Haun - Beatrice Burleigh

Episode chronology
← Previous "Jetrel"	Next → "The 37's"
- Star Trek: Voyager season 1

"Learning Curve" is the sixteenth episode of Star Trek: Voyager and final episode of the first season. In this episode Tuvok forces some of the Maquis crew into a Starfleet training program and systems malfunction throughout the ship as the bio-neural gel packs begin to fail. This episode has several guest stars including Derek McGrath as Chell, Kenny Morrison as Gerron, and Catherine McNeal as Henley. Tuvok is part of the regular cast and is played by Tim Russ.

This was written by Ronald Wilkerson and Jean Louise Matthias, and directed by David Livingston.

The episode aired on UPN on May 22, 1995. It was watched by 8.3 million viewers in the U.S.

== Background and summary ==
This was the last episode of the first season, and contributes to the Maquis narrative thread, a story arc that spanned three Star Trek franchise television shows including The Next Generation, Deep Space Nine, and Voyager.

In the Voyager opening pilot episode "Caretaker", two opposing ships (U.S.S. Voyager of Starfleet, and Val Jean of the Maquis) are pulled from the Badlands in the Alpha quadrant 70,000 light-years away into the Delta quadrant by an extra-galactic alien who abducts the crews of Voyager and Val Jean. The crew of the Val Jean are then conscripted into the Voyager crew after the destruction of their own vessel while fending off an attack by a Kazon warship. Subsequent episodes establish the continued friction between Starfleet and Maquis crew-members, despite their common goal of returning home to the Alpha quadrant.

The episode sheds some light on Maquis motivations in general, and in particular, the struggle of one crew-member who continues to suffer after the crimes committed against his wife by the Cardassians. The Cardassian race was introduced in The Next Generation season four episode "The Wounded" wherein a Federation-Cardassian peace treaty has ceded control of some Federation planets to the Cardassians, who then proceed to brutalize the Federation colonists, giving rise to an underground Maquis resistance group that feels they need to fight both the Cardassians and the Federation in order to survive and maintain their own colonies within Cardassian-occupied territory.

As a result of having to adapt to rebel/guerrilla tactics, Maquis crew-members have a less rigid set of rules of conduct, and a less structured chain-of-command and operational style. This provides a genesis for the episode's main concepts, and a resolution to the tension between these two organizational styles. Security Chief Tuvok is assigned to train four of the most problematic Maquis crew-members to better operate aboard their new ship, according to Starfleet rules and regulations.

Also, Neelix nearly destroys Voyager trying to make his own cheese, which is resolved by giving the ship "a fever", curing its biological systems.

== Plot ==
After Crewman Dalby is insubordinate towards security chief Tuvok, the Vulcan discusses the situation with Captain Janeway. Janeway understands Tuvok's frustration but points out that the Maquis have never been trained in Starfleet procedures or philosophies. A class is organized to teach several Maquis crew members Starfleet protocol, taught by Tuvok, a former academy instructor. At first, his efforts are unsuccessful; the trainees walk out of their first lesson despite Tuvok's orders to stay. Later in the mess hall, Dalby makes it clear to Chakotay that he wants to do things the Maquis way. Chakotay punches Dalby, saying that if Dalby wants to do things the Maquis way then so will he, by using violence to enforce discipline. With his point made, the students return to Tuvok's training sessions.

When Tuvok shares with Neelix that he is frustrated with the Maquis's unwillingness to adapt to Starfleet protocol, Neelix indicates that perhaps it is Tuvok who is being inflexible in his strict adherence to procedure, and that perhaps if he were to "bend the rules" a little bit, the trainees would respect him more. Tuvok attempts to get to know Dalby socially, but makes little progress.

"Get the cheese to sickbay"

— Roxann Biggs-Dawson (in the role of B'Elanna Torres) delivered a line that "summed up exactly what [fans] thought of the new show".

Meanwhile, it is discovered that the bioneural circuitry that runs many of the crucial systems on the ship has become infected with disease. Tuvok and the Doctor trace the infection to a batch of homemade cheese that Neelix has prepared. The Doctor discovers that the only way to kill the microbe is to heat the bioneural gel packs. The crew runs the warp core at 80% without going to warp, which produces enough heat to kill the virus; however, it also initiates a pulse surge, causing many power conduits to be blown out.

At that moment, another class is in progress in a cargo bay when a power conduit blows and the room begins to fill with noxious gas. One of the trainees is unconscious but Tuvok orders the rest to leave him behind and save themselves. The trainees are angered at his apparent disregard for their friend's life, and initially refuse, but Tuvok forces them out. He then contradicts his own order, going back to save the injured crewman, and in the process succumbs to the gas and passes out. The other trainees work together to rescue Tuvok and their friend. Afterwards, Dalby tells Tuvok that if he is willing to bend Starfleet protocol to save one of them, perhaps they can bend to accept the Starfleet rules after all.

== Production ==
The episode's principal plotline, dealing with Tuvok and his trainees, was originally devised as a subplot for another episode, until the writers decided that they liked it enough to make it the focus of an episode. The producers of the show were disappointed that "Learning Curve" became the default season finale due to scheduling issues with the season, describing it as "a run-of-the-mill episode...it wasn't a cliffhanger. It wasn't a season-ender. It had no bang. We just sort of disappeared." Four other episodes had already been produced, but they were held back until the start of the second season. Schematics used to construct the sets for this episode were among the items sold off in the It's a Wrap! online auction of Star Trek items.

== Casting ==
The episode includes several guest and co-stars including Armand Schultz, Derek McGrath, Kenny Morrison, Catherine MacNeal, Thomas Dekker, Lindsey Haun, and Majel Barret.

== Reception ==
Trek Navigator's Mark A. Altman gave the episode two and a half stars stating the episode "plays like a lightweight version of the same writers' "Lower Decks"." Doux Reviews notes the reluctant trainees must choose between "..confinement in the brig or being punched.." but called the end "obvious but satisfying", giving it a rating of "one out of four recruits". TV.com lists "Learning Curve" with a rating of 8.1 points out of 10 on 201 User reviews as of 2018.

In 2020, io9 listed this as one of the seven "must-watch" episodes of Star Trek: Voyager's first season.
