= Jack Clayton =

British film director and producer (1921–1995)

- Born: 1 March 1921; Brighton, England
- Died: 26 February 1995 (aged 73); Berkshire, England
- Occupation: Film director
- Years active: 1936–1992
- Spouses: Christine Norden (m. 1947; div. 1953) Katherine Kath (m. 1953, divorced) Haya Harareet (m. 1984)

Jack Isaac Clayton (1 March 1921 – 26 February 1995) was an English film director and producer, known for his skill directing literary adaptations. He was nominated for an Academy Award for Best Director for his feature-length debut, Room at the Top (1959), and three of his films were nominated for the Palme d'Or.

Starting out as a teenage studio "tea boy" in 1935, Clayton worked his way up through British film industry in a career that spanned nearly sixty years. He rapidly rose through a series of increasingly important roles in British film production, before shooting to international prominence as a director with his Oscar-winning feature film debut, the drama Room at the Top (1959). This was followed by the much-lauded horror film The Innocents (1961), based on Henry James's The Turn of the Screw. He went on to direct such literary adaptations as The Pumpkin Eater (1964), The Great Gatsby (1974), and Something Wicked This Way Comes (1983).

Clayton looked set for a brilliant future, and he was highly regarded by peers and critics alike, but a number of overlapping factors hampered his career. He was a notably 'choosy' director, who by his own admission "never made a film I didn't want to make", and he repeatedly turned down films (including Alien) that became hits for other directors. He was also dogged by bad luck and bad timing – the Hollywood studios labelled him as difficult, and studio politics quashed a string of planned films in the 1970s, which were either taken out of his hands, or cancelled in the final stages of preparation. In 1977, he suffered a double blow: his current film was cancelled just two weeks before shooting was due to begin, and a few months later he suffered a serious stroke which robbed him of the ability to speak, and put his career on hold for five years.

Despite his relatively small oeuvre, the films of Jack Clayton continue to be appreciated, and both they and their director have been widely admired and praised by leading film critics like Pauline Kael and Roger Ebert, and by film industry peers including Harold Pinter, Martin Scorsese, Guillermo del Toro, François Truffaut, Tennessee Williams and Steven Spielberg. The British Film Institute wrote "he could be seen as the most literary of British film-makers, and yet he was also deeply committed to using all the resources offered him by cinema. His films were always carefully crafted but they also contained moments of spontaneity and rawness."

== Early life and career, 1921–1958 ==
Born in Brighton, Clayton began his career as a child actor on the film Dark Red Roses (1929). Giving up on his earlier aspiration to become a speed skater he joined Alexander Korda's Denham Film Studios in 1935 at the age of 14, and rose from tea boy to assistant director to film editor.

During the late 1930s, Clayton worked on many notable British features, including the first British Technicolor film Wings of the Morning (1937), and worked with visiting American directors, including Thornton Freeland on Over the Moon (1939) and Tim Whelan on Q Planes (1939). As a second assistant director he co-ordinated all three shooting units on Korda's lavish Technicolor fantasy The Thief of Baghdad (1940), having previously worked with Thief co-director Michael Powell on the noted "quota quickie" The Spy in Black (1939). He also gained invaluable editing experience assisting David Lean, who was the editor (and uncredited director) of the screen adaptation of Shaw's Major Barbara (1941).

While in service with the Royal Air Force film unit during World War II, Clayton shot his first film, the documentary Naples is a Battlefield (1944), representing the problems in the reconstruction of Naples, the first great city liberated in World War II, ruined after Allied bombing and destruction caused by the retreating Nazis. After the war, he was second-unit director on Gordon Parry's Bond Street (1948) and production manager on Korda's An Ideal Husband (1947). Clayton married actress Christine Norden in 1947, but they divorced in 1953. In the early 1950s, Clayton became an associate producer, working on several of the John and James Woolf's Romulus Films productions, including Moulin Rouge (1952) and Beat the Devil (1953), both directed by John Huston. It was during the making of Moulin Rouge that Clayton met his second wife, French actress Katherine Kath (born Lilly Faess), who portrayed legendary can-can dancer "La Goulue" in the film; they married in 1953, following Clayton's divorce from Norden, but the marriage was short-lived. It was also during this period that Clayton first met rising British star Laurence Harvey, with whom he worked on both The Good Die Young (1954) and I Am a Camera (1955).

Clayton made his second film as a director, the Oscar winning short The Bespoke Overcoat (1956) for Romulus. Based on Wolf Mankowitz's theatrical version (1953) of Nikolai Gogol's short story The Overcoat (1842), Gogol's story in the film is re-located to a clothing warehouse in the East End of London and the ghostly protagonist is a poor Jew.

Clayton also worked as producer on a series of screen farces during 1956, including Three Men in a Boat (again with Laurence Harvey), followed by the thriller The Whole Truth, which starred Stewart Granger as a movie producer.

== Films as director, 1959–1992 ==
=== Room at the Top (1959) ===
With funding from Romulus Films, Clayton directed his first full-length feature, a gritty contemporary social drama adapted from the novel by John Braine. Although it was the first and only occasion on which Clayton took over a project from another director (in this case Peter Glenville), Room at the Top (1959) was a hit both critically and commercially. It established Clayton as one of the leading directors of his day, made an international star of lead actor Laurence Harvey, won a slew of awards at major film festivals, and was nominated for six Oscars (including Best Director), with Simone Signoret winning Best Actress, and scriptwriter Neil Paterson winning for Best Writing, Screenplay (Based on Material from Another Medium). A harsh indictment of the British class system that has been credited with spearheading Britain's movement toward realism in films, it inaugurated a series of realist films known as the British New Wave, which featured, for that time, unusually sincere treatments of sexual mores, and introduced a new maturity into British cinema, breaking new ground as the first British feature film to openly discuss sex.

Following the success of his feature debut, Clayton was offered many prestige projects, but he rejected all of them, later commenting that he felt that they were "carbon copies" of Room at the Top. Among the titles he turned down (according biographer Neil Sinyard) were Sons and Lovers (Jack Cardiff), Saturday Night and Sunday Morning (Karel Reisz) and The L-Shaped Room (Bryan Forbes), all of which became major hits for their respective directors. An alternative interpretation was offered by film editor Jim Clark, who would work with Clayton on his next two films – he claimed that "Clayton's inability to make a decision was legendary" and that this was why he took so long to decide on his next film.

=== The Innocents (1961) ===
Setting a pattern that continued through the rest of his career, Clayton took a completely different tack with his second feature, on which he was both producer and director. The period ghost story The Innocents (1961) about a woman's descent into madness was adapted by Truman Capote from the classic Henry James short story The Turn of the Screw, which Clayton had first read when he was 10. By coincidence, Clayton was contracted to make another film for 20th Century Fox, as was actress Deborah Kerr, whom Clayton had long admired, so he was able to cast Kerr in the lead role as Miss Giddens, a repressed spinster who takes a job in a large, remote English country house; there working as the governess to an orphaned brother and sister, Giddens gradually comes to believe that her young charges are possessed by evil spirits.

The film has consistently received high praise on many counts – Kerr's performance, which is often rated as one of the best of her career; the unsettling performances of the two juvenile leads, Martin Stephens (Miles) and Pamela Franklin (Flora); the eerie score by the French composer Georges Auric; and especially the black-and-white widescreen cinematography of Freddie Francis. Although Clayton was initially dismayed at Fox's insistence that the film be shot in CinemaScope (a format he greatly disliked) Francis was able to use it to great advantage, carefully framing each scene, and using innovative techniques, such as placing protagonists at the extreme opposite edges of the screen during dialogue scenes, or focusing on the central region while using specially-made filters to blur the edges of the frame, creating a subtle but disturbing sense of unease in the viewer. Capote's screenplay (with uncredited contributions from John Mortimer) was mainly adapted from William Archibald's stage version of the story.

Although it was not a major commercial hit, it earned strongly positive reviews on release and its reputation has grown steadily over the years. Pauline Kael praised it as "one of the most elegantly beautiful ghost movies ever made", and on its release, Daily Express reviewer Leonard Mosley raved: "It is at least 20 years since I sat in a cinema and felt the skin crawling on the back of my head through sheer nervous tension, but I felt that creepy sensation once more this week. I was terrified by a film in which no blood is visibly shed and no graves are dug up." Both Francis and Capote subsequently rated their work on the film as the best of their respective screen careers, and it has been widely acclaimed as a classic of psychological horror by many leading directors. François Truffaut, on spotting Clayton in a restaurant, sent him a note, scribbled on a napkin, which read, "The Innocents is the best English film after Hitchcock goes to America."

=== The Pumpkin Eater (1964) ===
The Pumpkin Eater (1964) featured a screenplay by leading British dramatist Harold Pinter, adapted from the novel by Penelope Mortimer, and cinematography by Clayton's longtime colleague Oswald Morris, with whom he had worked on many projects during their days with Romulus Films; it also marked the first of five collaborations between Clayton and French composer Georges Delerue, and a film appearance by rising star Maggie Smith. A psycho-sexual drama, set in contemporary London, it examined a marriage in crisis, with Anne Bancroft starring as an affluent middle-aged woman who becomes estranged from her unfaithful and emotionally distant husband, a successful author (Peter Finch). Like both its predecessors, the film was widely acclaimed by critics – Harold Pinter won the 1964 BAFTA Award for Best British Screenplay, with Anne Bancroft winning both Best Actress at the Cannes Film Festival and the BAFTA Award for Best Foreign Actress, and she was also nominated as Best Actress at the 37th Academy Awards (losing to Julie Andrews). In the capable supporting cast, Yootha Joyce as a psychotic young woman sitting opposite Bancroft under the hairdryers, delivered a performance that has been called by Clayton's biographer one of the "best screen acting miniatures one could hope to see."

Despite critical praise, the film failed to connect with audiences, and Clayton later expressed the view that, like several other of his projects, the film was a victim of "bad timing".

Although film editor Jim Clark recalled the production as a largely happy experience, it marked the end of his working relationship with Clayton. After a screening at Cannes, Clayton decided to cut five minutes from the film and although Clark objected, Clayton eventually took most of the footage from the pivotal scene in which Anne Bancroft's character has a breakdown in the middle of Harrods. Clark privately confided his misgivings to Clayton's assistant Jeanie Sims, but later suspected that Sims might have told Clayton, because after Clark had started work on his next movie he received a vitriolic letter, apparently from Clayton, who blamed Clark for the failure of the film, and claimed that he had "never been behind the project" – although Clark suspected the letter might not have been written by Clayton at all, since it was typed and Clayton "never used a typewriter".

=== Our Mother's House (1967) ===
Clayton's fourth feature, and his first in colour, was an offbeat psychological drama about a family of children who conceal the fact that their single mother has died, and go on living in their house. Although it was a commercial failure, it received a glowing review from Roger Ebert on its release, earned star Dirk Bogarde a BAFTA Best Actor nomination. Steven Spielberg later expressed great admiration for the film. It was adapted from the novel by Julian Gloag, to which Clayton had been introduced by his friend, Canadian writer Mordecai Richler. Novelist Jeremy Brooks wrote the screenplay, with some revisions made by Clayton's third wife, actress Haya Harareet. It featured strong performances from Bogarde (who described the production as one of happiest experiences of his career) and from the ensemble cast of seven child actors, which included Pamela Franklin (Flora from The Innocents), Sarah Nicholls (who had previously appeared in The Pumpkin Eater, later known as Phoebe Nicholls), and Mark Lester, who later appeared in the title role of Oliver!. Jeremy Brooks's daughter, Margaret Brooks (later known as Margaret Leclere) was also cast, along with several other untrained child actors. The elegant score was again composed by Georges Delerue, although he and Clayton would not work together again for another fifteen years. Despite its high quality and good reviews, the film again failed to connect with audiences, and Neil Sinyard suggests that its box-office performance was hampered by the fact that it was given an 'X' Certificate in the UK, restricting the film to audiences over 16. Clayton subsequently endured a string of career reversals that prevented him from making another film until 1974.

=== The Great Gatsby (1974) ===
The only film Clayton was able to complete between 1968 and 1982 was his Hollywood production of F. Scott Fitzgerald's The Great Gatsby (1974). It was the biggest and most expensive production of Clayton's career, with it being produced by David Merrick, its screenplay made by Francis Ford Coppola, cinematography by Douglas Slocombe, music by Nelson Riddle, and a supporting cast that included Bruce Dern, Karen Black, Sam Waterston, Scott Wilson, Lois Chiles and Hollywood veteran Howard Da Silva, who had also featured in the 1949 version of the film.

According to Neil Sinyard, it was actress Ali MacGraw who suggested the remake of Gatsby (with herself in the role of Daisy) to her then husband Robert Evans, head of production at Paramount, and Clayton was reportedly MacGraw's first choice as director. By the time the film was confirmed, however, MacGraw had left Evans for Steve McQueen. Although heavily hyped, it did not fare well with the critics, whose reactions were typified by Vincent Canby in The New York Times:

"(it) moves spaniel-like through F. Scott Fitzgerald's text, sniffing and staring at events and objects very close up with wide, mopey eyes, seeing almost everything and comprehending practically nothing ... The language is right, even the chunks of exposition that have sometimes been turned into dialogue. The sets and costumes and most of the performances are exceptionally good, but the movie itself is as lifeless as a body that's been too long at the bottom of a swimming pool."

Canby was also critical of the casting of Robert Redford, ("hardly an ideal choice") and concluded his review by dismissing the film as "frivolous without being much fun". Critics also targeted a supposed lack of 'chemistry' between its two leads, a view no doubt fuelled by comments from Farrow herself, who subsequently revealed that she found it hard to establish a rapport with her co-star, who was obsessed with the unfolding real-life drama of the Watergate scandal and who, when not on camera, spent nearly all his time in his trailer, watching the coverage of the Watergate hearings on TV.

Ironically, in spite of the poor reviews, the movie did good business at the box office and became one of Clayton's most commercially successful films, taking over $26 million against its budget of $6.5 million. It also fared well in major industry awards, winning two Oscars that year (Best Costume Design for Theoni V. Aldredge, and Best Music for Nelson Riddle), three BAFTA Awards, (Best Art Direction for John Box, Best Cinematography for Douglas Slocombe, and Best Costume Design for Theoni V. Aldredge), as well as the Golden Globe for Best Supporting Actress for Karen Black, and three further Golden Globe nominations, for Best Supporting Actor (Bruce Dern and Sam Waterston) and Most Promising Newcomer (Sam Waterston).

Tennessee Williams, in his book Memoirs (p. 178), wrote: “It seems to me that quite a few of my stories, as well as my one acts, would provide interesting and profitable material for the contemporary cinema, if committed to ... such cinematic masters of direction as Jack Clayton, who made of The Great Gatsby a film that even surpassed, I think, the novel by Scott Fitzgerald.”

=== Something Wicked This Way Comes (1983) ===
Clayton returned to directing after an extended hiatus forced on him by his 1977 stroke. His new film was another dream project that originated more than twenty years earlier, but which he had been unable to realise. Even before it came into Clayton's hands, the film version of Ray Bradbury's Something Wicked This Way Comes had a chequered history. Bradbury wrote the original short story in 1948 and in 1957 (reportedly after seeing Singin' in the Rain some 40 times), Bradbury adapted it into a 70-page screen treatment and presented it as a gift to Gene Kelly. Clayton evidently met Bradbury around 1959 and expressed interest in directing the film but Kelly was unable to raise the money to produce it. Bradbury subsequently expanded the treatment into the novel version of the story, which was published in 1962.

According to a 1983 New York Times interview with Bradbury, he and Clayton reconnected and revived the project thanks to a pair of coincidental meetings. In 1969, while walking through Beverly Hills, Bradbury met Peter Douglas (the son of actor Kirk Douglas), who was hoping to become a movie producer; he asked Bradbury if he had any suitable screenplays and Bradbury suggested Something Wicked. Coincidentally, Clayton was having lunch with Kirk Douglas on the very same day, and when Douglas asked the director about films he might like to make, Clayton also mentioned Something Wicked This Way Comes. Peter and Kirk Douglas then optioned the rights to the book and Bradbury spent five months editing his unwieldy 240-page script to a more feasible 120 pages. The script was approved for production by Paramount but at this point it fell foul of the power struggle between Paramount head of production, David Picker and the studio's new president Barry Diller. According to Bradbury's account, Picker loved the script, but Diller "hated anything Picker loved" so he ordered the production to be shut down. Clayton later admitted that he was so enraged by Diller's decision that he put his fist through a Paramount office window.

In the early 1980s, after Clayton had recovered from his stroke, Peter Douglas was able to sell the project to the Disney studios, with Clayton again signed to direct. The film was fraught with problems throughout its production. Clayton and Bradbury reportedly fell out after the director brought in British writer John Mortimer for an uncredited rewrite of the screenplay. Clayton made the film as a dark thriller, which saw him to return to themes he had explored in earlier films – the supernatural and the exposure of children to evil.

When he submitted his original cut, the studio expressed strong reservations about its length and pacing, its commercial potential and Disney took the unusual step of holding the film back from release for almost a year. Clayton was reportedly sidelined (although he retained his director credit) and Disney spent an additional six months and some $5 million overhauling it, performing numerous cuts, removing the original score (to make it more 'family-friendly') and shooting new scenes (in some of which, because of the long delay caused by the reshoots, the two child stars were noticeably older and taller). According to the American Film Institute catalogue, the film's principal photography took place between 28 September and December 1981 with additional sequences shot in late 1982 and early 1983.

The version of the film released in late April 1983 was a compromise between Disney's insistence on a commercial film with 'family' appeal and Clayton's original, darker vision of the story. To reduce costs, the editor, Argyle Nelson Jr, was fired and assistant editor Barry Gordon was promoted to replace him (resulting in the film's dual editor credit). Gordon was given the task of re-editing the film and at Disney's insistence, removed some of Clayton's scenes. The most prominent casualty was the pioneering computer-generated animation sequence that was to have opened the film, which depicted the empty train bearing Dark's Carnival arriving in the town and magically unfolding itself into place. The much-heralded sequence (which was discussed in detail in a 1982 edition of Cinefantastique) would have been the first significant use of the new technology in a major Hollywood movie but in the final cut, only one brief CGI shot was retained. Another Clayton sequence that was removed featured a giant disembodied hand that reached into the boys' room and tried to grab them – this was deleted by the studio on the grounds that the mechanical effect was not realistic enough and it was replaced with a new sequence in which the boys' room is invaded by spiders. (In 2012, co-star Shawn Carson recalled the harrowing experience of having to film the new scene, which was done using real spiders). Bradbury was asked to write new opening narration (read by Arthur Hill) to help clarify the story and new special effects were inserted, including the "cloud tank" storm effects.

Another major disappointment for Clayton and his musical collaborator Georges Delerue was the loss of the original score, which Disney rejected as being 'too dark'. It was replaced by a new score, written by James Horner. Delerue's soundtrack (which the composer considered the best of the music he wrote for Hollywood films) remained unheard in the Disney vaults until 2011, when the studio unusually gave permission for the French Universal label to issue 30 minutes of excerpts, from the original 63 minutes of studio recordings on a limited edition CD (coupled with excerpts from another unused Delerue score, for Mike Nichols' Regarding Henry).

=== The Lonely Passion of Judith Hearne (1987) ===
Clayton's last feature film was the British-made The Lonely Passion of Judith Hearne (1987), a film he had originally pitched in 1961. Adapted from his own novel by Brian Moore, it starred Maggie Smith as a spinster who struggles with the emptiness of her life, and it again featured a score by Georges Delerue. It won Clayton critical plaudits for the first time in many years, and former collaborator Larry McMurtry described the film as "Brian Moore's best work, and perhaps Jack Clayton's too".

=== Memento Mori (1992) ===
Clayton reunited with Maggie Smith and Georges Delerue in 1992 for what was to be his final screen project, and his first comedy – a feature-length BBC television adaptation of Memento Mori, based on the novel by Muriel Spark, for which he also co-wrote the screenplay and another project he had nursed since he first read the story, while making Room at the Top. Featuring a strong cast that included Smith, Michael Hordern, and Thora Hird, Memento Mori expressed quietly moving meditations on disappointment and ageing. It aired in April 1992, just a month after Georges Delerue died in Hollywood, aged 67. According to Neil Sinyard Clayton was finally encouraged to make the film following the success of Driving Miss Daisy, "which proved that the theme of old age need not be box-office poison". Clayton successfully pitched it to the BBC, who were open to such a project following its recent successes with "made for TV" films like Truly Madly Deeply and Enchanted April. It was also shown at festivals worldwide, where it was well-received, and it won several awards, including a Best Screenplay award from the Writers' Guild of Great Britain.

== Filmography (as director) ==
- Naples Is a Battlefield (1944) – documentary short
- The Bespoke Overcoat (1956) – short fiction subject
- Room at the Top (Romulus Films, 1959)
- The Innocents (20th Century Fox, 1961)
- The Pumpkin Eater (Romulus Films/Columbia, 1964)
- Our Mother's House (Filmways/Heron Film Productions/MGM, 1967)
- The Great Gatsby (Paramount, 1974)
- Something Wicked This Way Comes (Disney, 1982, released 1983)
- The Lonely Passion of Judith Hearne (Handmade Films, 1987)
- Memento Mori (BBC Screen Two, 1992)

== Career problems and unrealised projects ==
Despite his high critical standing, Clayton encountered repeated career setbacks after the release of Our Mother's House and over the decade and a half between the release of Our Mother's House (1967) and Something Wicked This Way Comes (1983), he was only able to complete one feature as a director, The Great Gatsby (1974). One reason was Clayton's own perfectionism as a filmmaker; he was known for his discernment and taste, his painstaking and meticulous approach to his work, and his desire not to repeat himself, and in his biographer's words, Clayton "never made a film he did not want to make". Consequently, he rejected many notable films in the wake of Room at the Top. In 1969, despite his love of the book, he turned down the chance to direct They Shoot Horses, Don't They? because he did not want to take over a film that had already been prepared and cast, and was ready to shoot – although his decision opened up a career-making opportunity for his replacement, Sydney Pollack. Later still, in 1977, he turned down the chance to direct the film that was eventually made as Alien by Ridley Scott.

Clayton's output was also compromised by the inherent riskiness of the film business. As his biographer Neil Sinyard elucidates, Clayton worked intensively on many projects throughout his directing career, but for various reasons most never came to fruition. Among the projects that Clayton was never able to bring to the screen, or which were eventually made by other directors, were:

- Sweet Autumn (1966), an original screenplay by Edna O'Brien, which was never made.
- The Walking Stick (1968), adapted from the novel by Winston Graham. Clayton was offered the project but had to decline due to the illness and subsequent death of his mother; it was eventually made in 1970, directed by Eric Till and starring Samantha Eggar and David Hemmings.
- The Looking Glass War (Columbia, 1968–69) – Clayton was originally attached to direct the screen adaptation of the John le Carré novel, with a script by his friend Mordecai Richler. Richler later claimed that he and Clayton walked off the project due to interference from Columbia Pictures (thereby earning Clayton a reputation for being 'difficult'). Richler's biographer Reinhold Kramer suggested that the real problem was that Clayton was unable to raise enough money to get the movie into production, but Neil Sinyard asserts that Columbia cancelled the film after Clayton refused to accede to changes the studio had ordered to Richler's script, and he and Richler resigned from the production. Clayton himself also opined (in a letter to Le Carré) that he suspected that Columbia was short of money after the expensive failure of Casino Royale, and that the studio had bought the rights to the novel without realising that it was "not James Bond". The project was eventually revived under director Frank R. Pierson, who jettisoned Richler's screenplay and made the film from his own adapted script, although that proved to be a critical and commercial flop.
- Zaharoff, Pedlar of Death (1969) was one of Clayton's most cherished projects, a biopic about the notorious early 20th century arms dealer and political manipulator Basil Zaharoff. It was originally slated to be made for Universal, and Clayton reportedly did extensive research for it, but it was never given approval. He tried to revive the project twice more, in 1978 and 1990, but was never able to get it made.
- The Tenant (1969–75) – Clayton was originally attached to make a film adaptation of Roland Topor's psychological horror novel for Universal around 1970, but this project never made it into production. He revived it while working for Paramount in the early 1970s, intending to make it after The Great Gatsby, but to Clayton's great chagrin studio head Barry Diller wrongly assumed Clayton had lost interest in the film and gave it to Roman Polanski, without consulting Clayton. When he discovered this, Clayton phoned Diller and excoriated him for taking away a project that had been acquired specifically for him, and giving it to another director without his knowledge.

Another complicating factor in Clayton's career was that several film projects were cancelled without warning when pre-production was well advanced – in one case, just two weeks before shooting was to have started. Neil Sinyard nominates three major projects, Casualties of War, Fall Creek, and Silence, the successive failures of which reportedly devastated Clayton, and Clayton himself later opined that these setbacks contributed to his subsequent health problems:

- Casualties of War (Paramount, 1970) was a controversial Vietnam War drama, based on a true story by Daniel Lang, published in The New Yorker in 1969. The story concerns four American soldiers who are charged with the rape and murder of a young Vietnamese woman after one of their comrades (who had refused to take part in the crime) informs on them. An early script by Peter Hammill was rejected, and many leading writers were considered for the project, before novice screenwriter David Giler submitted a first-draft script that Clayton deemed "magnificent". According to Neil Sinyard, Paramount cancelled the film at the behest of the Pentagon, who feared that it might erode public support for the war effort. It was eventually made for Columbia by Brian De Palma in 1989, with Michael J. Fox in the lead role.
- Fall Creek (1976), another collaboration with producer David Merrick, Fall Creek was a 'revisionist' look at the American frontier, in a similar vein to contemporary "new wave westerns" like Little Big Man and McCabe & Mrs. Miller. The script by Larry McMurtry was adapted from the novel by Jessamyn West, and dealt with a notorious 1824 massacre of Native Americans in Indiana, and the racial and political crisis that followed. The project was originally conceived with Robert Redford as the star, but he turned it down. Larry McMurtry discusses the production in his book Hollywood: A Third Memoir, calling the screenplay "one of my better early scripts" and describing Clayton as "much the most fun" of any director he worked with. According to McMurtry, the project collapsed after David Merrick (ominously) suffered a stroke, after which he used wheelchair. Its cancellation was a bitter blow for Clayton, who was an ardent fan of the genre, and had long hoped to direct a western.
- Silence (Fox, 1977) was a contemporary urban thriller about racial tensions, based on the James Kennaway novel about a white man who escapes from a pursuing black gang by hiding out in the apartment of a mute African-American woman. The film was reportedly cancelled just two weeks before filming was scheduled to start, and according to Sinyard this was a devastating blow to Clayton. In a curious turn of events, Hollywood executive Barry Diller was responsible for the demise three of the films Clayton planned to make in the 1970s. In 1970 Clayton's plans for a film adaptation of Ray Bradbury's Something Wicked This Way Comes temporarily fell foul of a power struggle between Diller (who had just been appointed President of Paramount Pictures) and Paramount's head of production David Picker, and Diller cancelling the project. Five years later, Diller took The Tenant from Clayton without consulting him, and gave it to Roman Polanski. Finally, in 1977, Silence was cancelled just two weeks before it was due to go into production – ironically, again by Diller, who had recently left Paramount to become the head of 20th Century Fox.

In 1977, as compensation for the cancellation of Silence, Fox offered Clayton the chance to film a new science fiction script co-credited to David Giler and Dan O'Bannon, but Clayton turned down the film (Alien), and it was ultimately given to Ridley Scott who, like Sydney Pollack before him, scored a career-making hit. A few months later, Clayton suffered a major stroke which robbed him of the ability to speak. He was helped to recover by his wife Haya, and a group of close friends, but he later revealed that he deliberately kept his condition secret because he feared he might not get work again if his affliction became known. He did not commit to another assignment for five years.

- The Bourne Identity (1983) – after completing Something Wicked This Way Comes, Clayton was hired to direct a film adaptation of Robert Ludlum's best-selling espionage thriller, which was to have starred Burt Reynolds as Jason Bourne. Clayton had met Reynolds several years earlier, while working with Reynolds' then-partner, Sally Field, on another unrealised project, and Clayton felt that Reynolds was a star whose acting potential had not been fully explored. The production was repeatedly postponed due to location issues and problems with Reynolds' schedule, and it went into "development hell." Clayton was not involved in the 1988 telefilm version or the successful 2002 theatrical film with Matt Damon (which bore little resemblance to Ludlum's novel).

== Personal life ==
When asked his religion, he replied: "ex-Catholic". Clayton was married three times, his first was to actress Christine Norden in 1947, but they divorced in 1953; the same year he married again to French actress Katherine Kath, but this was short-lived. His third marriage, in 1984, was to the Israeli actress Haya Harareet, and this lasted until his death.

=== Death and legacy ===
Clayton died in hospital in Slough, England from a heart attack, following a short illness, on 25 February 1995.

On the first anniversary of Clayton's death, BAFTA held a ceremony to celebrate his life and career, which featured a screening of The Bespoke Overcoat and a solo flute performance from Delerue's score for Something Wicked This Way Comes, which was a favourite of Clayton's wife Haya. Tributes were delivered by Sir John Woolf, Harold Pinter, Karel Reisz, Freddie Francis, Clayton's editor Terry Rawlings, his agent Robert Shapiro, and actors Sam Waterston and Scott Wilson, with whom he had worked on The Great Gatsby. In his professional tribute to Clayton, Harold Pinter said:

"Jack Clayton was a director of great sensitivity, intelligence and flair. He was a gentle man, with a quiet, wry sense of humour, but professionally he possessed the utmost rigour and a fierce determination. I wrote the screenplay of The Pumpkin Eater in 1963. It remains, in my view, a film of considerable power and, of course, absolute integrity."

Former colleague Jim Clark was given his major break by Clayton, who hired him as the editor on The Innocents. They became close friends (and regular drinking partners) during the making of that film. In his 2010 memoir Dream Repairman, Clark offered a number of insights into their personal and professional relationship, as well as the often contradictory personality traits exhibited by the director, whom he recalled as "a very complex personality. The iron fist in the velvet glove."

"He was a complex man – he drank too much, smoked too much and was dangerously unpredictable. Jack was a barroom brawler who would, if provoked, attack people with his fists. He was also charming and seductive, which masked his many faults."

Clark said that, while often charming, Clayton could be temperamental, and was sometimes prone to outbursts of extreme anger. He recounted one incident in which Sims was unavoidably late calling Clayton with the reviews from the pre-released critics' screening of The Innocents. When Sims finally contacted him, Clayton (who had been too nervous to attend) reportedly flew into a rage, viciously berating Sims over the phone, and when Clark arrived at Clayton's studio office the next morning, he discovered that Clayton had completely smashed a large plaster scale model of Bly House, and was refusing to speak to them. Although Clark worked with Clayton on both The Innocents and The Pumpkin Eater, their working relationship and friendship effectively ended after the latter film, after Clayton apparently sent Clark a vitriolic letter blaming him for the failure of the film. The two met again at Paramount Studios in Hollywood, while Clayton was working on The Great Gatsby, during which (according to Clark):

"(Clayton) upset everyone by hurling a chair through his office window. The office window was on the first floor and the chair landed on some executive's parked Mercedes."
