= Haya Harareet =

Israeli actress (1931–2021)

- חיה הררית
- Harareet in 1960
- Born: Haya Neuberg; 20 September 1931; Haifa, British Mandate of Palestine (now in Israel)
- Died: 3 February 2021 (aged 89); Marlow, Buckinghamshire, England
- Other names: Haya Hararit; Haya Harareet-Clayton
- Occupations: Actress, screenwriter
- Years active: 1955–1974
- Spouses: Nachman Zerwanitzer (divorced) Jack Clayton (m. 1984; died 1995)

Haya Harareet (Hebrew: חיה הררית; 20 September 1931 – 3 February 2021) was an Israeli actress and screenwriter. She made her film acting debut in Hill 24 Doesn't Answer (1955), Israel's first feature length film. One of her major film roles was playing Esther, Ben Hur's love interest in the 1959 Hollywood-made film Ben-Hur.In signing a multi-year contract with MGM, she became the first Israeli actress attached to the Hollywood studio system.

== Early life ==
Haya Neuberg (חיה נויברג) was born in Haifa, in what was then Palestine, the second of three children. Her Ashkenazi Jewish parents, Reuben and Yocheved Neuberg, emigrated to the pre-Israel Yishuv community of Palestine from Poland when they were young. Her father worked for the government in Tel Aviv. She received the surname Hararit (later changed to Harareet), which means "mountainous" in Hebrew, at school. She left the family home at the age of 17 to join the Israeli military ensembles, and entertained soldiers from the War of Independence.

She was also the winner of one of the earliest beauty pageant contests established in Israel.

== Career ==
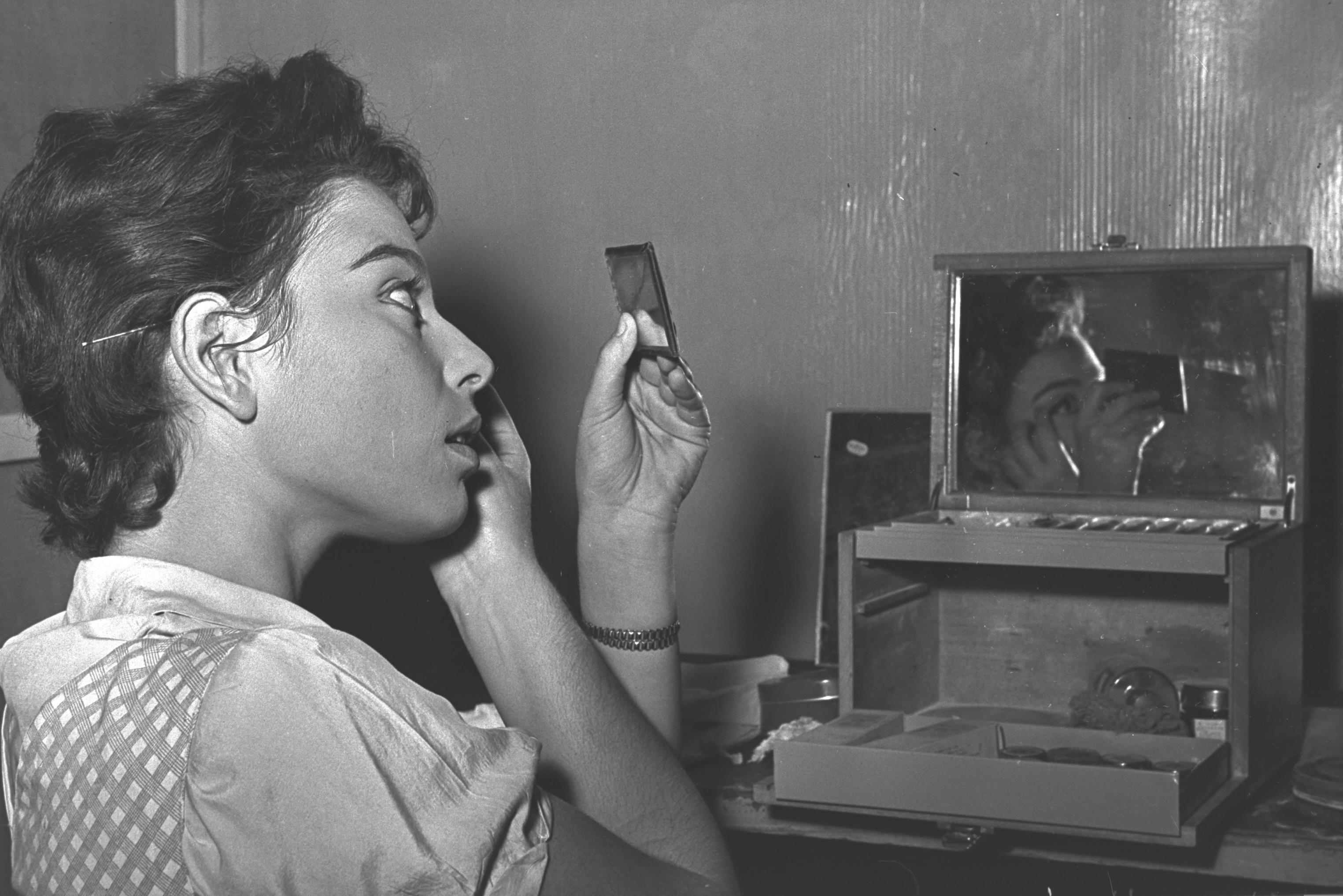
Harareet preparing for a play in Israel (1954)

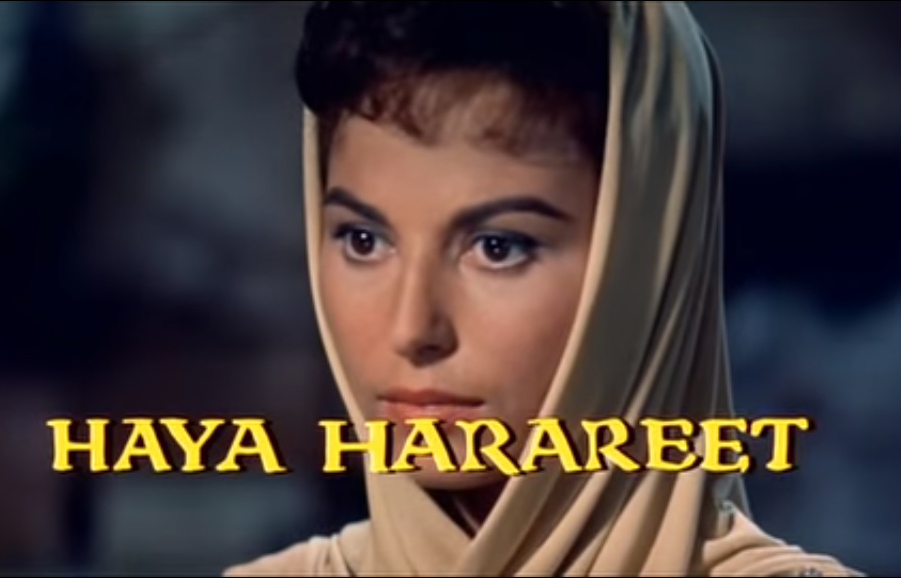
Harareet in the official trailer for Ben-Hur (1959)

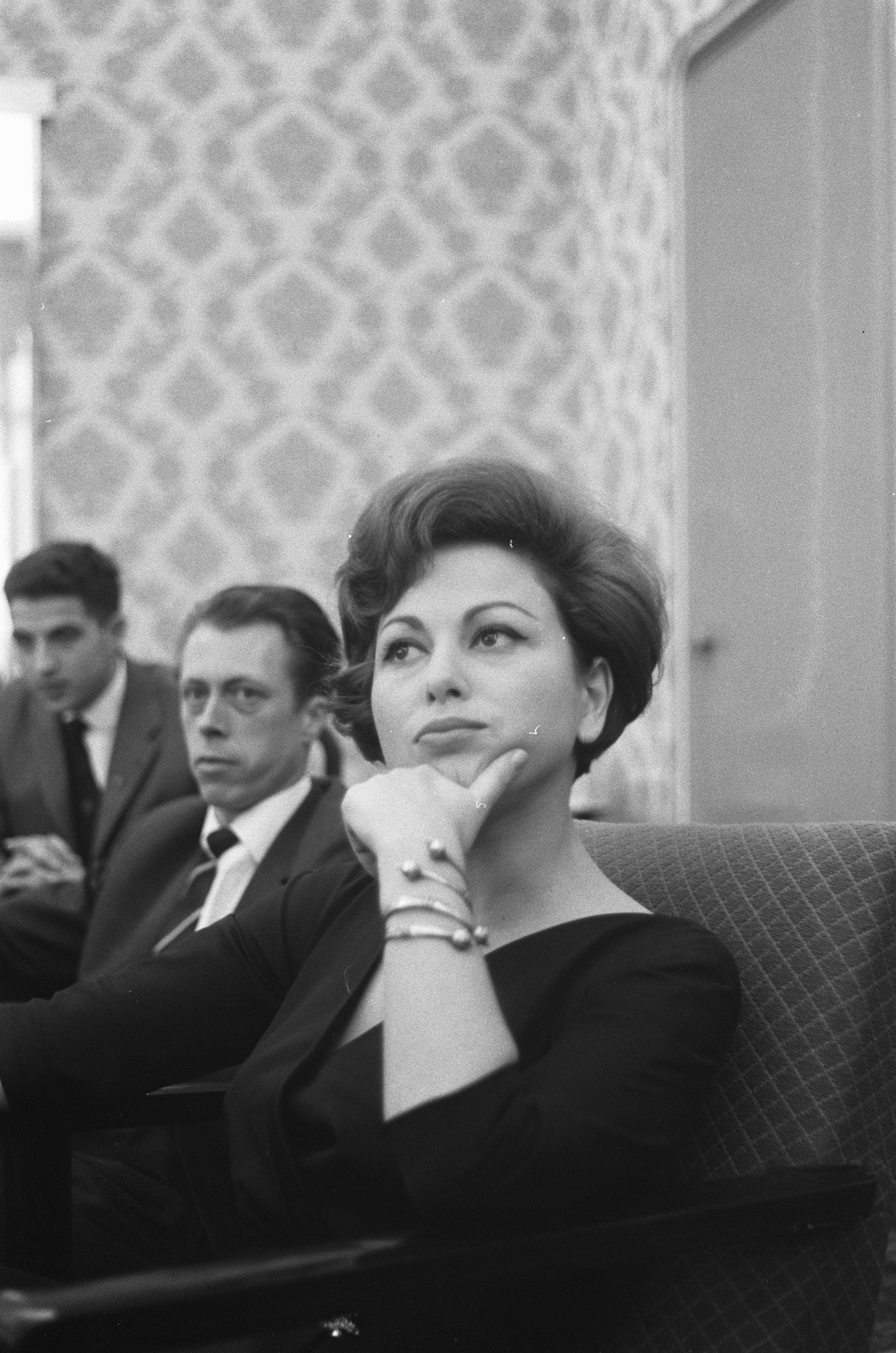
Harareet at a press conference for Ben-Hur in Amsterdam, Netherlands (1960)

Harareet launched her acting career on stage, landing roles with Cameri Theater.

She made her film debut in Hill 24 Doesn't Answer (1955), Israel's first feature length film. The picture was nominated for the Palme d'Or at the 1955 Cannes Film Festival, and for which was honoured with a Best Actress award. In 1956, she relocated to Italy, where she learned Italian and befriended Michelangelo Antonioni and Federico Fellini. She later played opposite Virna Lisi in Francesco Maselli's The Doll that Took the Town (1957), an Italian film.

She then moved to London and then Paris, where she learned French and performed in French-language stage productions. In Paris, she was approached to consider the major role of Esther in Ben-Hur (1959) alongside Charlton Heston. The role remained her most widely remembered performance in international cinema. She was chosen over thirty other actresses, including Ava Gardner and Carroll Baker.Variety, in its review of Ben-Hur, praised Harareet's performance:

Haya Harareet, an Israeli actress making her first appearance in an American film, emerges as a performer of stature. Her portrayal of Esther, the former slave and daughter of Simonides, steward of the House of Hur, is sensitive and revealing. Wyler presumably deserves considerable credit for taking a chance on an unknown. She has a striking appearance and represents a welcome departure from the standard Hollywood ingenue.

Then came 1961's L'Atlantide (Journey Beneath The Desert, aka The Lost Kingdom), directed by Edgar G. Ulmer and co-starring Jean-Louis Trintignant. She appeared opposite Stewart Granger in Basil Dearden's film The Secret Partner (1961), and she played the role of Dr. Madolyn Bruckner in The Interns (1962).

She was disappointed by the roles she was offered following the success of Ben-Hur, feeling that she was typecast as the "exotic beauty", adding: "I’m an actress who played the part of Esther. But that doesn’t mean I have to go on playing her for the rest of my life.” She was keen to exit her four-year contract with MGM, as a ruse, she raised her friendship with socialist friends, telling the studio: "You don’t want to be associated with a communist, do you?" In truth, she was never a member of a Communist party, but was able to negotiate an early exit from her contract.'

She co-wrote the screenplay for Our Mother's House (1967), from the novel of the same name by Julian Gloag.

== Personal life ==
Harareet's first husband was Nachman Zerwanitzer, an Israeli irrigation engineer. They lived in an apartment in Tel Aviv and were divorced sometime before 1961.

Harareet's second husband was British film director Jack Clayton. They met at the 1960 Academy Awards, marking the beginning of their 35-year relationship. They were married in High Wycombe, Buckinghamshire, England, in 1984. Clayton died in 1995.

In the early 1970s, Harareet graduated with a degree in political science from the London School of Economics.

=== Death ===
On 3 February 2021, Harareet died at her home in Marlow, Buckinghamshire, England, at age 89 from natural causes. At the time of her death, she was the last surviving credited cast member of Ben Hur.

== Filmography ==
Year	Title	Role	Notes
1955	Hill 24 Doesn't Answer (Giv'a 24 Eina Ona)	Miriam Miszrahi	Israeli film
1957	The Doll That Took the Town (La donna del giorno)	Anna Grimaldi	First Italian film
1959	Ben-Hur	Esther	First American film
1961	The Secret Partner	Nicole "Nikki" Brent	British film
1961	Journey Beneath the Desert (Antinea, l'amante della città sepolta)	Queen Antinea	Italian-French co-production
1962	The Interns	Dr. Madolyn Bruckner	Second and final American film
1962	The Last Charge (La leggenda di Fra Diavolo)	Fiamma	Italian film
1964	L'ultima carica	Claudia	Italian film
1974	My Friend Jonathan		Second and final British film
