= Something Wicked This Way Comes (film) =

1983 film by Jack Clayton

- Theatrical release poster by David Grove
- Directed by: Jack Clayton
- Screenplay by: Ray Bradbury
- Based on: Something Wicked; This Way Comes by Ray Bradbury
- Produced by: Peter Douglas
- Starring: Jason Robards; Jonathan Pryce; Diane Ladd; Pam Grier
- Narrated by: Arthur Hill
- Cinematography: Stephen H. Burum
- Edited by: Barry Mark Gordon; Art J. Nelson
- Music by: James Horner
- Production companies: Walt Disney Productions; The Bryna Company
- Distributed by: Buena Vista Distribution
- Release date: April 29, 1983
- Running time: 95 minutes
- Country: United States
- Language: English
- Budget: $20 million
- Box office: $8.4 million

Something Wicked This Way Comes is a 1983 American dark fantasy film directed by Jack Clayton, from a screenplay written by Ray Bradbury, based on his 1962 novel of the same name. It stars Jason Robards, Jonathan Pryce, Diane Ladd and Pam Grier.

The title was taken from a line in Act IV of William Shakespeare's Macbeth: "By the pricking of my thumbs / Something wicked this way comes".

It was filmed in Vermont and at the Walt Disney Studios in Burbank, California. It had a troubled production – Clayton fell out with Bradbury over an uncredited script rewrite, and after test screenings of the director's cut failed to meet the studio's expectations, Disney sidelined Clayton, fired the original editor, scrapped the original score, delaying the film by five months, spent $4 million on the new changes and spent many months re-shooting, re-editing and re-scoring the film before its eventual release. Critical reviews were mixed to positive, and the film was a box office disappointment.

Produced by Walt Disney Productions, Something Wicked This Way Comes was the last Disney film to be released by the studio under its original name. It was released in the United States by Buena Vista Distribution on April 29, 1983.

== Plot ==
In Green Town, Illinois, two young boys, a reserved Will Halloway and somewhat rebellious Jim Nightshade, leave from an after-school detention for "whispering in class" and hurry home. The boys live next door to each other and were born a minute apart on Halloween. Will lives with his mother and father Charles while Jim lives with his single mother; it is heavily implied that his father walked out on them. A lightning rod salesman named Tom Fury arrives and sells one to Jim, claiming that it will protect him from an upcoming storm. The boys soon hear of a carnival coming to town led by the ominous Mr. Dark.

The carnival arrives and is set up overnight. Will and Jim notice that many of the residents seem oddly entranced by some of the attractions such as the amputee bartender Ed who sees his missing arm and leg return in a mirror and the boys' teacher Miss Foley who wishes to regain her youth. Will and Jim see a carousel that is closed off and are confronted by Dark, who quickly becomes suspicious of them. Later, they witness him using the carousel on his assistant, Mr. Cooger, who reverts to a little boy. Will and Jim head off to see Foley, but she is with her "nephew", who is actually Cooger, and are forced to leave.

Foley suddenly becomes younger, but loses her vision and is taken by Cooger to Dark. Will gets into an argument with Jim when the latter reveals that he has always been envious of the former being older and wants to use the carousel. They then witness Fury being tortured by Dark, who wants the secret of the upcoming storm and uses his other assistant, the Dust Witch, to seduce him, but to no avail. The boys run when they are found out and try to go to bed. In the middle of the night, the duo are attacked by tarantulas, but the lightning rod that Fury gave Jim earlier saves them.

In the morning, Dark leads his carnival, now consisting of some of the townspeople, in a parade, though Will and Jim deduce that it is a search party for them. Charles eventually figures out that the boys are in trouble and when confronted by Dark, manages to deter him. Charles, Will and Jim head to the library where the former reveals that the carnival had come to town before and that his own father had fought them. Dark arrives, searching for Will and Jim and offers Charles his youth back, but he resists. He knocks out Charles and makes off with the boys back to the carnival. Charles regains himself and heads to the carnival just as the storm arrives. He runs into Jim's mother and deters her before she too succumbs to Dark's powers.

Charles heads into the hall of mirrors, where Dark continues to taunt him about his age. Will declares his love for his father and repels the Dust Witch, allowing Fury to escape his imprisonment and impale her with a lightning rod. Will and Charles find Dark attempting to use the carousel with Jim in tow, but they rescue him just as lightning strikes the ride. Dark begins to age and decay, before being reduced to a skeleton which collapses into pieces.

Will and Charles express happiness to awaken Jim and the three flee with the horses and ponies and the townspeople just as the carnival begins to get sucked away into a giant tornado. Will, Jim and Charles head back into town and begin to happily dance back home, with the danger now over.

== Cast ==
- Jason Robards as Charles Halloway
- Jonathan Pryce as Mr. Dark
- Diane Ladd as Mrs. Nightshade
- Royal Dano as Tom Fury
- Vidal Peterson as Will Halloway
  - Arthur Hill as Adult Will (Narrator)
- Shawn Carson as Jim Nightshade
- Mary Grace Canfield as Miss Foley
  - Sharan Lea as Young Miss Foley
- Richard Davalos as Mr. Crosetti
- Jack Dodson as Dr. Douglas
- Bruce M. Fischer as Mr. Cooger
  - Brendan Klinger as Cooger as a Child
  - Scott De Roy as Cooger as a Young Man
- Pam Grier as the Dust Witch
- Jack Dengel as Mr. Tetley
- Ellen Geer as Mrs. Halloway
- James Stacy as Ed, the Bartender
  - Tony Christopher as Young Ed
- Angelo Rossitto as Little Person #1
- Peter D. Risch as Little Person #2
- Tim T. Clark as Teenage Boy
- Jill Carroll as Teenage Girl
- Sharon Ashe as Townswoman
- Phil Fondacaro as Demon Clown (uncredited)
- Jerry Maren as Demon Midget (uncredited)
- Steve Mirer as Townsperson (uncredited)

== Production ==
Ray Bradbury first wrote the original screenplay adapted from his 1948 short story "Black Ferris" in 1958, intended for Gene Kelly as director. Financing for the project never came, and Bradbury converted the screenplay into a novel, published in 1962.

In 1971, Bradbury agreed to write a new screenplay based on the novel for Jack Clayton, with whom Bradbury previously worked on Moby Dick. In January 1973, Sam Peckinpah was announced as director for the film, with a script written by Bradbury.

In June 1976, Clayton returned as director and the property was being developed by The Bryna Company, a production company formed by Kirk Douglas. Douglas became interested in the property after meeting Bradbury at a bookstore in Los Angeles, and intended to star in the film. Douglas' son Peter Douglas was set to produce, with Robert Chartoff and Irwin Winkler. They secured a deal with Paramount Pictures to finance the $6,000,000 production, to be filmed on location in Texas. However, production never began and the film was eventually put into turnaround by Paramount CEO Barry Diller over the objections of feature division president David V. Picker. At various times, Mark Rydell and Steven Spielberg expressed interest in making the film.

At this time, Walt Disney Pictures was focusing on films with more mature themes in an attempt to break free from its image as an animation and family film studio. In 1981, they acquired the film rights to Something Wicked This Way Comes and announced that it would go into production with a $16 million budget. They asked Bradbury for his input on selecting a cast and director, and he suggested Clayton, feeling they had worked well together at Paramount. Peter Douglas returned as the film's producer, but Kirk Douglas was unable to appear in it despite playing a major role in its pre-production. In a 1981 issue of Cinefantastique, Bradbury said that his top choices for Mr. Dark were Peter O'Toole and Christopher Lee, but to keep the budget down, Disney decided to cast Jonathan Pryce, who was still relatively unknown.

Principal photography began on September 28, 1981, and lasted 77 days. Filming was mostly on Disney's Golden Oak Ranch in Newhall, California, as shooting on location would have been too costly. Some exterior scenes were shot in Vermont. As the film progressed, two visions emerged for the film: Bradbury and Clayton wanted to stay as faithful to the novel as possible, while Disney wanted a more accessible, family-friendly film. Bradbury and Clayton fell out when Bradbury learned that Clayton had, at the studio's insistence, hired John Mortimer to do an uncredited revision of Bradbury's screenplay.

At a Q&A session following a 2012 screening of the film, actor Shawn Carson explained that he read some ten times for the part of Will, but after a request from Bradbury, he read for and was cast as Jim Nightshade. Although he had blond hair at the time, and co-star Vidal Petersen had dark hair, Carson's hair was dyed jet black and Petersen's was bleached blond to fit the new casting.

For the original score, Clayton picked Georges Delerue who had scored his films The Pumpkin Eater and Our Mother's House, but his score was removed and replaced on short notice with one by James Horner after concerns were raised about its "aggressively sinister" nature. A soundtrack album of Delerue's unused score was released by Intrada Records in 2015, which had released Horner's replacement score in 2009.

Editor Barry Gordon was hired as assistant to the film's original editor, Argyle Nelson Jr. He recalled in 2012 that after Clayton submitted his original cut, Disney expressed concerns about its length, pacing and commercial appeal. The studio then took the project out of Clayton's hands and conducted an expensive six-month reshoot and re-edit, resulting in the two child leads looking noticeably older in some shots. Nelson was let go for budgetary reasons, and although Gordon was prepared to follow Nelson and leave the production, Nelson encouraged him to stay, and Gordon edited the final cut (resulting in the film's dual editor credits).

Disney spent $4 million on re-filming, re-editing and re-scoring, with the changes requiring delaying the planned Christmas 1982 date by five months. Gordon was required to make a number of changes to Clayton and Nelson's original cut, removing several major special-effects scenes, and incorporating the new material directed by visual effects artist Lee Dyer, including a new prologue narrated by Arthur Hill. Among the casualties was a groundbreaking animation scene which would have been one of the first major uses of computer-generated imaging in a Hollywood film: combining the then-new technology of CGI with traditional animation, it depicted Dark's circus train rolling into town, and the carnival magically materialising—the smoke from the locomotive becoming the ropes and tents, tree limbs merging to form a Ferris wheel, and a spider web morphing into a wheel of fortune. The deleted scene was previewed in detail in the May–June 1983 issue of Twilight Zone Magazine, but the re-edit retained only a few seconds of the sequence.

Another cut sequence depicted Mr. Dark using his sinister powers to send a huge disembodied hand to reach into the house to grab the boys. Disney executives felt the mechanical effect wasn't realistic enough, and was replaced by a scene where the room is invaded by hundreds of tarantulas, which was shot using real animals. Years later, Shawn Carson recalled the considerable discomfort he and Vidal Petersen experienced being exposed to the irritating urticating hairs of the 200 tarantulas used in the sequence.

The original themes of Bradbury's novel, the suggestion of menace, the autumn atmosphere of an American Midwest township and the human relationships between characters that attracted Clayton escaped preview audiences completely, with Clayton heavily criticized. New special effects sequences were shot and a hastily composed new score by composer James Horner replaced Delerue's original music. Initial test screenings did not fare well with audiences, and Disney recommissioned Bradbury to write an opening narration sequence and new ending.

Bradbury referred to the film's final cut as "not a great film, no, but a decently nice one".

The railroad scenes were filmed on the Sierra Railroad in Tuolumne County, California.

== Reception ==
=== Box office ===
The film grossed $8.4 million at the domestic box office against its $20 million budget.

=== Critical response ===
Roger Ebert of the Chicago Sun Times gave the film three-and-a-half stars out of four, and wrote:

It's one of the few literary adaptations I've seen in which the film not only captures the mood and tone of the novel, but also the novel's style. Bradbury's prose is a strange hybrid of craftsmanship and lyricism. He builds his stories and novels in a straightforward way, with strong plotting, but his sentences owe more to Thomas Wolfe than to the pulp tradition, and the lyricism isn't missed in this movie. In its descriptions of autumn days, in its heartfelt conversations between a father and a son, in the unabashed romanticism of its evil carnival and even in the perfect rhythm of its title, this is a horror movie with elegance.

Janet Maslin of The New York Times wrote the film "begins on such an overworked Norman Rockwell note that there seems little chance that anything exciting or unexpected will happen. So it's a happy surprise when the film...turns into a lively, entertaining tale combining boyishness and grown-up horror in equal measure"; according to Maslin, "the gee-whiz quality to this adventure is far more excessive in Mr. Bradbury's novel than it is here, as directed by Jack Clayton. Mr. Clayton, who directed a widely admired version of The Turn of the Screw some years ago, gives the film a tension that transcends even its purplest prose." Kevin Thomas of the Los Angeles Times praised the film as "one of Walt Disney's best efforts in recent years—a film that actually has something to offer adults and adolescents alike."

Variety wrote that the film "must be chalked up as something of a disappointment. Possibilities for a dark, child's view fantasy set in rural America of yore are visible throughout, but various elements have not entirely congealed into a unified achievement...Clayton has done a fine job visualizing the screenplay by Bradbury himself, but has missed really connecting with the heart of the material and bringing it satisfyingly alive."

Gene Siskel of the Chicago Tribune gave the film 2 stars out of 4 and wrote that it "opens promisingly" but has a script which "tries to cram too much material into one story" and a climax that "couldn't be more disappointing", with "neon special effects that overwhelm the last half hour of the movie. The result is an oddball combination of a Twilight Zone episode with the climactic, zapping-the-Nazis scene from Raiders of the Lost Ark."

Richard Harrington of The Washington Post criticized the "lethargic" pace, "stolid acting", and special effects that "are shockingly poor for 1983 (a time-machine carousel is the only effective sequence on that front)."

Tom Milne of The Monthly Film Bulletin lamented: "The novel's texture has been thinned out so ruthlessly that little is left, but the bare bones; and all they add up to, shorn of the slightly self-conscious Faulknerian poetics of Bradbury's style, is a dismayingly schoolmarmish moral tale about fathers and sons, the vanity of illusions, and homespun recipes for dealing with demons ('Happiness makes them run')."

Christopher John reviewed the film in Ares Magazine #15 and commented that "if the chance ever comes your way to take this one in, grab it. Rarely does such a quiet, yet strong picture get made in this country."

Colin Greenland, reviewing Something Wicked This Way Comes for Imagine magazine, called it "one for the SFX connoisseur, a visual feast".

As of November 2025, the film holds a 63% rating on Rotten Tomatoes, based on 35 reviews. The consensus reads: "True terror and typical Disney wholesomeness clash uncomfortably in Something Wicked This Way Comes." Metacritic, which uses a weighted average, assigned the film a score of 68 out of 100, based on 13 critics, indicating "generally favorable" reviews.

=== Accolades ===
The film won the 1984 Saturn Award for Best Fantasy Film and Saturn Award for Best Writing, and was nominated for five others, including best music for James Horner and best supporting actor for Jonathan Pryce. It was also nominated for the Hugo Award for Best Dramatic Presentation and Grand Jury Prize at the Avoriaz Fantastic Film Festival.

== Home media ==
The film was released by Walt Disney Studios Home Entertainment on Blu-ray for the first time on September 7, 2021, as a Disney Movie Club exclusive, which has since closed and therefore is out of print.

On October 3, 2025, it was made available to stream on Disney+ in the US, making it the first time the movie has been available on any streaming service. It is still unavailable in the UK/Europe.

== Remake ==
In 2014, Disney announced a remake of Something Wicked This Way Comes with Seth Grahame-Smith writing the script, making his directorial debut, and producing with David Katzenberg from their producing banner KatzSmith Productions. Reportedly, Grahame-Smith wanted to focus mostly on Ray Bradbury's source material from the book.

== See also ==
- List of films set around Halloween
- List of films about witchcraft
