= The Secret Partner =

1961 British film by Basil Dearden

- Directed by: Basil Dearden
- Written by: David Pursall; Jack Seddon
- Produced by: Michael Relph
- Starring: Stewart Granger; Haya Harareet; Bernard Lee
- Cinematography: Harry Waxman
- Edited by: Raymond Poulton
- Music by: Philip Green
- Production company: Metro-Goldwyn-Mayer British Studios
- Distributed by: Metro-Goldwyn-Mayer
- Release date: 15 March 1961 (Seattle, Washington)
- Running time: 91 minutes
- Country: United Kingdom
- Language: English
- Box office: 636,428 admissions (France)

The Secret Partner is a 1961 British thriller film directed by Basil Dearden and starring Stewart Granger, Haya Harareet and Bernard Lee. It was written by David Pursall and Jack Seddon. The screenplay concerns a shipping executive officer who is blackmailed by an evil dentist.

== Plot ==
John Brent is an executive, working under Charles Standish at the London head office of a shipping company. His marriage is in trouble because he is always short of money; his wife Nicole, certain he is spending it on another woman, leaves him and takes up with Clive Lang, a decorator they have hired.

What Brent's employer does not know is that his real name is John Wilson and he was once imprisoned for embezzlement. When he chose a dentist after being released, it happened to be the same man who did dental work at the prison, Ralph Beldon. Brent is not cheating on Nicole, but Beldon is blackmailing him by threatening to reveal his true identity to the company.

One day a stranger, his face masked and his voice disguised by an insert in his mouth, arrives at Beldon's home. He knows about the blackmail and demands Beldon take further advantage of Brent. Beldon will be mailed a package of sodium pentothal. At Brent's next dental appointment, he is to inject Brent with this truth serum and demand the combination to Standish's safe at the office. While Brent is incapacitated, he must also make impressions of Brent's keys, both home and office. Beldon is promised £15,000 to be paid later.

The plan is carried out, and the safe is robbed on a day when it happens to contain more money than usual – £100,000 – because of the scheduling of the ships.

Detective Superintendent Hanbury and Inspector Henderson investigate the case. There is no sign of a break-in; Brent and Standish have the only keys and are the only ones entrusted with the combination. Brent has just left the country on vacation and his keys are at the office. Traces of clay on them indicate that impressions were made.

Henderson jumps to the conclusion that Brent is guilty and provided the impressions to the actual thief; Hanbury, who is about to retire and wants to leave things neat and tidy, is less certain and insists on a proper investigation. They question Standish, Nicole, Lang, and others, and have Brent brought back to England for questioning. Standish had a motive to hurt Brent: he had learned that Brent was likely to be promoted to replace him.

But at Brent's apartment, the detectives find evidence of keys being copied. Brent manages to distract them and flee. He then tries to investigate on his own, and also to mislead the police, until he finally realizes that he might have been drugged by Beldon.

He calls Hanbury to Beldon's place and goes there with a gun, threatening Beldon at gunpoint until the man confesses to all his crimes. Brent then hands the unloaded gun to Hanbury.

The viewer learns the truth when Brent returns home and demonstrates to Nicole the disguise he used on Beldon. Brent is the criminal and always intended to frame himself and then blame Beldon. In this way he would get rid of the blackmailer and he and Nicole would have £85,000 to share.

However, she is not interested. She feels he took advantage of her by faking the breakup of their marriage and saddling her with Lang's attentions, and now she has fallen in love with another man and wants to leave him for real.

Heartbroken, Brent returns the money anonymously. Hanbury calls him in: he has guessed Brent's tricks, including the "pentothal" that was actually some harmless liquid, but to Henderson's surprise, he does not now feel it would be worthwhile prosecuting Brent.

Henderson wishes Hanbury a happy retirement, and Brent walks away, now alone in the world.

== Cast ==
- Stewart Granger as John Brent, aka John Wilson
- Haya Harareet as Nicole 'Nikki' Brent
- Bernard Lee as Detective Superintendent Frank Hanbury
- Hugh Burden as Charles Standish
- Lee Montague as Detective Inspector Tom Henderson
- Melissa Stribling as Helen Standish
- Conrad Phillips as Dr. Alan Richford
- John Lee as Clive Lang
- Norman Bird as Ralph Beldon
- Peter Illing as Strakarios
- Basil Dignam as Lyle
- William Fox as Brinton
- Sidney Vivian as Dock Forman
- Willoughby Goddard as hotel keeper
- Peter Welch as P.C. McLaren
- Dorothy Gordon as Miss Kerrigan, dentist's receptionist

== Production ==
Filming started on 1 September 1960. It was shot at the MGM-British Studios at Elstree and on location at a variety of settings across London, including Tower Bridge, the Royal Docks, Greenwich and South Kensington. The sets were designed by art director Elliot Scott.

== Reception ==
=== Box office ===
In May 1962 MGM's head of British production, Lawrence Bachmann, said the film was in profit.

=== Critical reception ===
The Monthly Film Bulletin wrote: "Undermined by an overcrowded, over-ingenious plot, this mystery thriller founders on the improbable premise that a man who was being blackmailed by his dentist would still go to him for treatment, and then allow himself to be given gas for an extraction. In fact it is this sub-Hitchcock sequence which provides a fatally premature clue to the identity of the thief. Otherwise director Basil Dearden's efforts to create tension have a contrived and pedantic air; the jazz score has a canned sound, strident and intrusive; and the supporting performances, particularly Haya Harareet's Nicole, are for the most part stiff. Stewart Granger does a thoroughly professional job in the key role, however, and Bernard Lee sketches in the conscientious, chain-smoking detective a good deal more sharply than the character warrants.

Kine Weekly wrote: "Its story, which concerns a big scale robbery, starts leisurely but penultimate suspense and a perfectly timed surprise denouement more than atone for delayed action. The players are, with few exceptions, equal to demands, the director wisely puts his best foot forward at just the right moment, and the backgrounds, effectively alternating between the posh and the seamy, subtly heighten key situations. Bookstall crime fiction, boldly "printed" on stout "paper," the overall can hardly fail to intrigue and thrill the populars. Very good British offering."

At AllMovie, Eleanor Mannikka called the film a "routine mystery story".

In the Radio Times, Allen Eyles noted "an implausible but ingenious British thriller ... flashily directed by Basil Dearden ... It remains watchable thanks to some skilful characterisation and the strong performances of Stewart Granger as the executive, Norman Bird as the dentist, and Bernard Lee as the dogged, chain-smoking policeman looking forward to retirement."
