= The Innocents (play) =

1950 theater play by William Archibald

- Original language: English
- Written by: William Archibald
- Characters: Flora; Mrs. Grose; Miss Giddens/Miss Bolton; Miles; Peter Quint; Miss Jessel
- Genre: Ghost story

Premiere
- Date: February 1, 1950
- Place: Playhouse Theatre

The Innocents is a play written by William Archibald that premiered on Broadway in 1950 and was revived in 1976. The play is based on the 1898 novella The Turn of the Screw by Henry James.

== Overview ==
The play is based on the novel The Turn of the Screw by Henry James. The play takes place in 1880 in the drawing room of an old country house in England. A new governess, Miss Giddens, arrives to look after the orphaned brother (age 12) and sister (age 8), who are "The Innocents". The household also employs a cook, Mrs. Grose. The spirits of the former valet, Peter Quint, and governess, Miss Jessel, haunt the house. (The name of the new governess was changed to Miss Bolton in the 1976 revival.)

== Productions ==
The original production opened on Broadway at the Playhouse Theatre on February 1, 1950, and closed on June 3, 1950, after 141 performances. Directed by Peter Glenville, the cast featured Beatrice Straight as Miss Giddens and Isobel Elsom as Mrs. Grose. Costumes were by Motley and Scenic Design was by Jo Mielziner. The play won the 1950 Tony Award, Best Scenic Design (Jo Mielziner). Regarding Straight's performance, Mel Gussow wrote: "In his Times review, Mr. Atkinson said that Ms. Straight acted 'with force, sensitivity and old-fashioned charm, in a style that Henry James would have been compelled to applaud.'"

It was revived Off-Broadway at the Gramercy Arts Theatre in April 1959 for 32 performances. The play featured Peggy Feury as Miss Giddens, Carroll McComas as Mrs. Grose and Judy Sanford and Christian de Bresson as the children. Carolyn Coates played Miss Jessel, the ghost. The set, by Gary Smith, was called "excellently ominous" by The New York Times reviewer, Louis Calta. Calta noted that the background music, by Alex North "set the proper mood for the frightening experiences".

A revival opened at the Morosco Theatre on October 21, 1976, and closed on October 30, 1976, after 12 performances. The play was directed by Harold Pinter, with scenery by John Lee Beatty, costumes by Deirdre Clancy, lighting by Neil Peter Jampolis, music by Harrison Birtwistle, and costume supervisor Mary McKinley. The cast starred Sarah Jessica Parker (Flora), Pauline Flanagan (Mrs. Grose), Claire Bloom (Miss Bolton), Michael Mackay (Miles), Dino Laudicina (Peter Quint), and Catherine Wolf (Miss Jessel). Understudies included Timothy Britten Parker and the Parker siblings' stepfather Paul Forste.

Clive Barnes, in his review of the 1976 revival for The New York Times wrote "Mr. Pinter has staged the piece with meticulously Gothic sensibility... The question remains why it was thought interesting enough to revive the play. The taste with which the revival was accomplished is unquestionable, but when you have talents of the nature of Miss Bloom and Mr. Pinter on hand, merely to resuscitate a pedestrian stage adaptation of a great novel seems to savor something of folly."

=== London ===
The play opened in the West End at Her Majesty's Theatre on July 3, 1952. The play, directed by Peter Glenville, featured Flora Robson.

=== Film ===
A film was made based on the novel The Turn of the Screw and on this play. The film The Innocents was released in 1961.
