= The Battle of the Villa Fiorita =

1965 film by Delmer Daves

- Directed by: Delmer Daves
- Screenplay by: Delmer Daves
- Based on: The Battle of the Villa Fiorita; 1963 novel by Rumer Godden
- Produced by: Delmer Daves
- Starring: Maureen O'Hara; Rossano Brazzi
- Cinematography: Oswald Morris B.S.C.
- Edited by: Bert Bates
- Music by: Mischa Spoliansky
- Production company: Warner Bros. Pictures
- Distributed by: Warner-Pathé Distributors
- Release date: 26 May 1965
- Running time: 111 minutes
- Country: United Kingdom
- Language: English

The Battle of the Villa Fiorita is a 1965 British drama film, based on the 1963 novel by Rumer Godden, directed by Delmer Daves. It stars Maureen O'Hara and Rossano Brazzi.

This was the last film for Delmer Daves who, two years earlier, wrote, produced and directed another film in which Maureen O'Hara played the female lead, Spencer's Mountain. This is the first film for Argentina-born English actress Olivia Hussey who, three years later, played Juliet in Franco Zeffirelli's Romeo and Juliet.

== Synopsis ==
In Italy, two children, Michael (Martin Stephens) and Debbie (Elizabeth Dear), learn that their mother, Moira (Maureen O'Hara) has left them for a lover, Lorenzo (Rossano Brazzi) who is a famous Italian composer. Michael convinces his sister to run away with him to the Villa Fiorita, where the couple are staying, to fetch their mother; he forces Debbie to sell her prized pony to afford the journey.

When Michael and Debbie arrive, Lorenzo calls their father to tell him the children are there and that he will send them home. However, Michael falls ill and Lorenzo allows them both to stay. Debbie joins forces with Lorenzo's daughter Donna to manipulate Moira into returning to Britain. A hunger strike by the girls ensues, but fails and ends in Moira slapping Debbie and Lorenzo spanking Donna.

Lorenzo decides to send the children home, but Michael and Donna try to flee on a sailboat during a storm. After the two nearly drown, Moira and Lorenzo agree they have lost the battle, and a heartbroken Moira returns to England with her children.

== Cast ==
- Maureen O'Hara as Moira
- Rossano Brazzi as Lorenzo
- Richard Todd as Darrell
- Phyllis Calvert as Margot
- Martin Stephens as Michael
- Elizabeth Dear as Debbie
- Olivia Hussey as Donna
- Maxine Audley as Charmian
- Ursula Jeans as Lady Anthea
- Ettore Manni as Father Rossi
- Richard Wattis as Travel Agent
- Finlay Currie as Concert Emcee
- Clelia Matania as Celestina

== Home media ==
Warner Bros. Pictures released the film for digital streaming through Vudu and Amazon Prime Video, albeit in standard definition.
