= The Doll That Took the Town =

1956 Italian film

- Directed by: Francesco Maselli
- Written by: Franco Bemporad; Cesare Zavattini; Francesco Maselli; Luigi Squarzina; Aggeo Savioli
- Produced by: Lorenzo Pegoraro
- Starring: Virna Lisi; Antonio Cifariello; Haya Harareet; Elisa Cegani; Vittorio Sanipoli; Serge Reggiani; Franco Fabrizi
- Cinematography: Armando Nannuzzi
- Edited by: Mario Serandrei
- Music by: Mario Zafred
- Distributed by: Medallion Pictures
- Release date: 1956
- Running time: 90 minutes
- Country: Italy
- Language: Italian

The Doll That Took the Town (Italian: La donna del giorno, lit. 'The Woman of the Day') is a 1956 Italian drama film directed by Francesco Maselli and starring Virna Lisi, Haya Harareet and Franco Fabrizi. For this film Maselli won the award for best young director at the Karlovy Vary International Film Festival.

== Plot ==
A struggling model concocts a story of being raped and beaten by three strangers and soon becomes a media darling. Complications arise when the police eventually arrest three suspects.

== Cast ==
- Virna Lisi as Liliana
- Antonio Cifariello as Giorgio Salustri
- Haya Harareet as Anna
- Serge Reggiani as Mario Grimaldi
- Elisa Cegani as Miss Attenni
- Franco Fabrizi as Aldo
- Vittorio Sanipoli as Police commissioner
- Mario Carotenuto as Editor
- Marcello Giorda as Marcello
- Camillo Milli as Camillo
- Diego Michelotti as Diego
- Giulio Paradisi as Giulio
- Giuliano Montaldo as Journalist
- Peter Van Wood as Himself
