= Hill 24 Doesn't Answer =

1955 film

- Film poster
- Directed by: Thorold Dickinson
- Written by: Zvi Kolitz; Peter Frye
- Produced by: Thorold Dickinson and Peter Frye
- Starring: Michael Wager; Edward Mulhare; Haya Harareet
- Cinematography: Gerald Gibbs
- Edited by: Joanna Dickinson; Thorold Dickinson
- Music by: Paul Ben-Haim
- Release date: 2 November 1955
- Running time: 101 minutes
- Country: Israel
- Languages: English; Hebrew

Hill 24 Doesn't Answer (Hebrew: גבעה 24 אינה עונה, romanized: Giḇʿā 24 ʾĒynāh ʿÔnā, Giv'a 24 Eina Ona), is a 1955 Israeli neorealist melodrama directed by Thorold Dickinson and based on stories by Zvi Kolitz. It is the first feature film produced in Israel, following the establishment of the state in 1948.

It was in competition at the 1955 Cannes Film Festival, where it was nominated for the Palme d'Or. The plot revolves around the personal stories of a number of soldiers who are on their way to defend a strategic hill overlooking the road to Jerusalem during the War of Independence.

== Plot ==
In 1948, just four hours and 45 minutes before a ceasefire takes effect, Captain Yehuda Berger instructs four volunteers - James Finnegan, an Irish former British policeman (who fell in love with a Jewish woman named Miriam Miszrahi); Allan Goodman, a tourist from the USA who fell in love with the struggle to found Israel; David Airan; and (at her insistence) Esther Hadassi (a Yemeni Jewish woman) - to take and hold the strategic "Hill 24", one of a number of hills dominating the highway into Jerusalem.

Afterward, Finnegan relates how he first met Berger in 1946, two years before the start of the 1948 Arab–Israeli War, while serving as a British policeman in Haifa. In a flashback, Finnegan is part of the police force rounding up Jews who came ashore in British-controlled Mandatory Palestine illegally at night. Finnegan finds an ailing Berger and Miriam Miszrahi, and goes to find medical help for Berger. He is relieved to learn that the pair escaped. Berger is a concentration camp survivor who arrived in Palestine illegally during the British Mandate period and joined the Jewish Brigade group to help other Jews make Aliyah Bet.

Later Finnegan and Berger encounter one another at a checkpoint, where Berger is identified. Finnegan's superior lets Berger go, ordering Sergeant Finnegan to follow him and apprehend his associates. Berger spots the police tailing him and flees. The two policemen follow him all the way to an apartment, which turns out to be Miriam's, but Berger manages to get away. When Miriam gets home, she finds the police in her apartment. Miriam, a fourth generation local resident studying to be a teacher, is taken in for questioning and detained under the Emergency Defence Regulations. She is questioned about her relationship with Berger and the Jewish Underground. As she is being questioned Berger, who has been apprehended, is brought into the station.

Miriam is released the next morning. Finnegan and Browning are ordered to keep her under surveillance. After several fruitless days, Lawson tells Finnegan he can make Miriam's acquaintance, much to Finnegan's delight. Finnegan falls in love with her and he convinces her to return to Haifa with him, where she is arrested by Finnegan's superior. Miriam later joins the army to fight in the 1948 War, and Finnegan joins also. He reveals to his fellow soldiers that he is an Irish Christian. Miriam and Finnegan meet briefly as Finnegan is deployed to Hill 24. As they drive towards the site of the operation Goodman, a New Yorker, tells the story of how he and Hadassi first met when he was wounded during the battle for the Old City. Hadassi, working as a nurse, helped care for him until the forces surrendered. They then signed up for Berger's unit together. The four die on the hill. Hadassi's body is found still clutching an Israeli flag. It is declared that the Hill has been claimed for Israel.

== Cast ==
- Edward Mulhare as James Finnegan
- Haya Harareet as Miriam Miszrahi
- Yitzhak Michael Shillo as Capt. Yehuda Berger (as Michael Shilo)
- Michael Wager as Allan Goodman
- Zalman Lebiush as the Rabbi
- Margalit Oved as Esther Hadassi
- Haim Eynav as Ya'acov
- Arik Lavie as David Airam (as Arie Lavi)
- Azaria Rapaport as the Mercenary

and in order of appearance.

- Eric Greene as Browning
- David Hershkovitz as Kiosk Owner
- Stanley Preston as Lawson
- Mati Raz as Interpreter
- Shraga Friedman as Travel Agent
- Ruth Rappaport as Hospital Nurse
- Shoshana Duer as Hospital Matron
- Arie Zeidmann as Itzik'l
- Leon Gilboa as French Official
- Abraham Barzilai as Arab Official
- David Ram as Israeli Official
- Burton Most as U.S. Official

Guest Players

- Shoshana Damari as The Druze Woman
- Yossi Yadin as The Jerusalem Commander (as Yosef Yadin)

== Production ==
It was a big-budget production amid Austerity in Israel, costing $400,000. All filming and production took place in Israel, using a mostly local crew. As it sought to attract an international audience, it was filmed in English.

It is based on stories by Zvi Kolitz, who had migrated to Mandatory Palestine in 1936, from Lithuania. Kolitz shared screenwriting credits with Jewish Canadian writer, Peter Frye.

The film was scored by Paul Ben-Haim and performed by the Israel Defense Forces Orchestra.

== Release ==
The film received a one-time special screening in Jerusalem in March 1955 attended by the Prime Minister of Israel, Moshe Sharett. It was also screened at the 1955 Cannes Film Festival which took place between April and May.

This was followed by its international theatrical premiere, at World Theater in New York City, marking the debut of its commercial release.

== Reception ==
=== Box office ===
The film was a moderate commercial success both in Israel and overseas against its high budget.

=== Critical reception ===
The film was a critical success and received two honourable mentions at the 1955 Cannes Film Festival, including for the performance of Haya Harareet.

It was praised in a November 1955 review published by The New York Times: "Its principals speak with restraint and conviction. However, and the courage and dedication displayed in "Hill 24" is not only plausible but also often moving." The review continued to praise the casting and concluded the film is: "an uncommonly forthright and an absorbing tribute to largely unsung valor." Nate Sugarman later wrote in The Forward that the film had "triumphed as a groundbreaking exposé of the 1948 War of Independence."

Director Martin Scorsese has repeatedly spoken positively about the film. In 2003, he told an interviewer that “Hill 24 Doesn’t Answer is a unique film,” drawing parallels between the “rich sense of place” established by Dickinson in the film's action scenes to that of Alfred Hitchcock. Scorsese added: “Dickinson is never afraid to push the emotion in a scene, and that’s rare in British film-making.” In 2024, in conversation with Edgar Wright, Scorsese again spoke about the film: "But Hill 24 Doesn’t Answer is fascinating because it has a documentary feel to it. You knew that it was something that was not shot in a traditional studio way. It went to locations. It had some very interesting editing."

In July 2008, the film was praised by Nate Sugarman in The Forward: "At the time of the film’s original release, in 1955, The New York Times called it “an uncommonly forthright and absorbing tribute to largely unsung valor.” Six decades later, it remains this — and perhaps even more." Sugarman added:" Hill 24 portended Israel’s future as a contributor to Western cinema. At the time, the majority of Israeli films centered on themes of traditional Zionist ideals, most notably owning and working land and connecting with the ancient roots of Judaism in the Holy Land. Hill 24 instead focuses on why it is that Jews and gentiles forming an unlikely fellowship would choose to risk their lives to defend a new Jewish homeland from the threat of annihilation."Dave Kehr also wrote about the film in July 2008 for The New York Times: "the Israeli raid on the Old City becomes a study in combat noir, exploring all the expressionist possibilities of Jerusalem’s narrow streets and vertiginous drop-offs."

In April 2021, the film was reappraised by Stuart Schoffman in the Jewish Review of Books. Schoffman wrote: "By opening and closing with a stark tableau of sacrifice on a Judean hill, the film invites the viewer to excavate its strata of myth and midrash."
