= Zvi Kolitz =

Lithuanian-born Jewish film/theatrical producer and writer

Zvi Kolitz (Hebrew: צבי קוליץ; December 14, 1912 – September 29, 2002) was a Lithuanian-born Jewish film and theatrical producer and a writer whose short story Yosl Rakover Talks to God became a classic of Holocaust literature.

== Life ==
Zvi Kolitz, a son of a prominent rabbinical family, was born in Alytus, Lithuania. He studied at the nearby Yeshiva of Slobodka and then lived for several years in Italy, where he attended the University of Florence and the Naval Academy at Civitavecchia. He emigrated to Palestine in 1936 and led recruiting efforts for the Zionist Revisionist movement. He was arrested by the British and jailed for his political activities. After Israel's independence in 1948, Kolitz became active in the state's literary and cultural life. In 2002, Kolitz died of natural causes in New York, NY.

== Yosl Rakover Talks to God ==
Kolitz is best known for Yosl Rakover Talks to God, a short story he wrote in 1946 for a Jewish newspaper in Buenos Aires. In the story, set in the final days of the Warsaw Ghetto, a pious Jew challenges God. And so, my God, before I die, freed from all fear, beyond all terror, in a state of absolute inner peace and trust, I will allow myself to call you to account one last time in my life, the fictionalized Rakover says, adding later I believe in the God of Israel, even when he has done everything to make me cease to believe in him.

A few years after it was published, the story was translated into English and Hebrew but without Kolitz's name as the author. It was passed on as an authentic testimony of the Warsaw Ghetto and ended up in several Holocaust anthologies and even as a meditation in Jewish prayer books.

It was many years before Kolitz was able to recapture his story and claim it as his own. It was later translated under his name in editions in Polish, French, Italian, German, Spanish, Danish and Swedish. In 1999, Pantheon Books published the story in a slim volume with afterwords by Paul Badde, Emmanuel Levinas and Leon Wieseltier. Dr. Levinas called it a text both beautiful and true, true as only fiction can be.

== Other works ==
While living in Israel in the early 1950s, Kolitz was a co-writer and co-producer of Hill 24 Doesn't Answer (1954), a 1947–1949 Palestine war movie, which was Israel's first full-length motion picture. He later moved to the United States and was co-producer of Rolf Hochhuth's The Deputy, one of the first plays to challenge the Vatican's silence during the Holocaust, which ran on Broadway, amid considerable controversy, for nine months in 1964.

Kolitz was co-producer of several other Broadway shows, including The Megilla of Itzik Manger (1968), and a musical, I'm Solomon, an expensive flop that ran for seven performances in 1968.

Kolitz also wrote several works of fiction and Jewish philosophy, including The Tiger Beneath the Skin: Stories and Parables of the Years of Death (Creative Age Press, 1947), Survival for What? (The Philosophical Library, 1969), The Teacher: An Existential Approach to the Bible (Jason Aronson, 1982) and Confrontation: The Existential Thought of Rabbi J. B. Soloveitchik (Ktav, 1993).

Until a few weeks before his death, Kolitz wrote a weekly column for the Yiddish newspaper Algemeiner Journal. The column appeared under his name for 32 years. He also taught courses in Jewish thought for many years at Yeshiva University.

== Awards ==
- 1999: National Jewish Book Award in the Nonfiction category for Yosl Rakover Talks to God

== Sources ==
- Goldman, Ari L. (October 7, 2002). "Zvi Kolitz, 89, Who Wrote an Enduring Holocaust Story". The New York Times.
