= Julian Gloag =

English novelist and screenwriter (1930–2023)

Julian Gloag FRSL
- Born: 2 July 1930; London, England
- Died: 12 September 2023 (aged 93); Provins, France
- Education: Magdalene College, Cambridge
- Occupation: Novelist
- Writing career
- Period: 1963–1996
- Notable works: Our Mother’s House (1963); A Sentence Of Life (1966); Lost and Found (1981)

Julian Gloag (2 July 1930 – 12 September 2023) was an English novelist. He was the author of eleven novels, the best known of which is his first, Our Mother’s House (1963), which was made into a film of the same name starring Dirk Bogarde.

Gloag was born in London, where he was largely brought up. He attended Magdalene College, Cambridge, and then emigrated to the United States before settling in France. Though his literary reputation has declined somewhat in Britain, he remains popular in France, where he lived much of his life, and there most of his work is available in translation from Gallimard. He was elected a Fellow of the Royal Society of Literature in 1970.

Gloag died in Provins on 12 September 2023, at the age of 93.

== Our Mother's House ==
=== Synopsis ===
The story concerns the seven Hook children, who decide not to report their mother's death for fear of being separated and sent to an orphanage. Instead they bury her in the back garden, pretending to the outside world that she is ill and confined to her room. Their problems begin when curious officials make inquiries, and well-meaning neighbours offer assistance. The children have begun quarrelling when an enigmatic stranger appears, claiming to be their father.

=== Critical reception ===
Gloag's first novel was an unexpected success and launched him onto the 1960s literary scene. Our Mother’s House received high praise from many prominent critics. Evelyn Waugh read it “with keen pleasure and admiration”. Christopher Fry says the novel “drew me into its world from the first page and held me there ... a penetrating and touching story, which at every point touches on even more than it speaks”. The London Magazine compares the work to William Golding’s Lord of the Flies and says it “achieves explosive effects with seemingly unpromising material”.

=== Film version ===
Film director Jack Clayton, who had previously directed Room at the Top, got to hear about Gloag's novel from his friend, Canadian writer Mordecai Richler, and he found it “instantly fascinating”. The film version of Our Mother’s House was produced by MGM and Filmways and released in 1967. Dirk Bogarde played the father, Charlie Hook, Yootha Joyce played cleaning lady Mrs Quayle, and Mark Lester played Jiminee, one of the younger boys.

Though a commercial failure, the film was well reviewed by Roger Ebert, who noted the Gothic elements, such as the bleak rundown house and attempts to commune with the spirit world, together with the parallels to Lord of the Flies. He praises the ensemble of child actors, saying “no adult actor can hope to hold his own against their innocent blue eyes”. Dirk Bogarde received a BAFTA nomination and described working on the project as one of happiest experiences of his career. Child star Mark Lester went on to achieve huge fame a year later with the titular role in the film musical Oliver!

=== Controversy over similarities to Ian McEwan’s The Cement Garden ===
When Ian McEwan’s The Cement Garden was published in 1978, some reviewers noted remarkable similarities between that novel and Our Mother’s House, and this issue resurfaced in 2006 when McEwan was again accused of copying passages from Lucilla Andrews’s memoir No Time for Romance – for the wartime hospital sections of his novel Atonement.

The Cement Garden and Our Mother’s House do share common themes and plot strands. Both involve a group of mixed-aged children who conceal their mother’s death and inter her corpse within the family home, and then attempt to carry on normally as best they can. In both works there is a Gothic atmosphere of increasing strangeness, decay and unraveling, which is evocative of the children-only world of Lord of the Flies. And both plots reach their denouements through the arrival of older male characters who figure out what is really going on.

McEwan himself denied the charge of plagiarism, claiming he was unaware of Our Mother’s House. Gloag was convinced he had been plagiarized and aired his views on Word for Word, a 1970s BBC book programme presented by Robert Robinson; the discussion panel included McEwan’s publisher, Tom Maschler, and Auberon Waugh. Gloag’s belief led him to write the subsequent novel Lost and Found, published in 1981, which involves a writer having his novel copied by another, who passes it off as his own.

== Novels mid-1960s and 70s ==
=== A Sentence Of Life ===
Gloag’s second novel, A Sentence Of Life (1966), tells the story of Jordan Maddox who suddenly finds himself accused of murder. At first it seems an amusing mistake to him, but to the police Maddox is the guilty man. Imprisoned, he undergoes an agonizing trial and a dark night of the soul where he confronts a more general sense of guilt.

=== Maundy ===
In Maundy (1968), the eponymous protagonist is an unassuming banker, planning marriage, until he undergoes “psychic dismemberment” and commences a spree of violence and vandalism. New York Times reviewer James R. Frakes says the novel “…has all the lineaments of a funnel or a maelstrom: the whole plot movement is a downwards whirl, a relentless plunge from glazed sunshine to devouring night”.

=== A Woman Of Character ===
Themes of suffering and alienation continue in Woman Of Character (1973), which involves Anne Mansard's killing of her fiancé and the ensuing complications surrounding his estate. Soon her lover and various family members and friends also meet untimely ends, all to Anne's advantage.

Paul Theroux in The New York Times says: “It is pervaded by an overwhelming stink of decadence, by subsidiary characters who are perfect demons and who deserve everything the tentative succubus of the title visits upon them.”

== Novels 1980s ==
=== Sleeping Dogs Lie ===
Gloag's fifth novel Sleeping Dogs Lie (1980) is another murder mystery and whodunit, which the Kirkus reviewer compares to the disordered psychological world of Hitchcock’s Spellbound, with the plot convolutions and red herrings of Agatha Christie. As in Gloag’s earlier works, childhood traumas and psychiatric intervention mix with crime and sexual intrigues in a complex layered narrative.

=== Lost and Found ===
In his Spectator review, A. N. Wilson describes Lost and Found as Julian Gloag’s “Sweet Revenge” for the perceived plagiarism of Our Mother’s House by Ian McEwan in The Cement Garden.

Set entirely in France, the story features Paul Molphey, a schoolteacher and writer of roughly Gloag's age. As a young man, Paul writes a novel and sends it off, hearing nothing. Many years later, he discovers that an upcoming writer, Jean-Pierre Montbarbon (who is roughly McEwan's age) has won a prize for his new novel. Paul reads the novel and finds it to be his own, reproduced almost verbatim: “He turned back to the beginning and started again, although he hardly had need to read. He knew it by heart. It had come back at last. Signals of a New World. Word for word, only the names altered.”

Enraged, Paul travels to Paris with a loaded revolver to confront Montbarbon, and reviewer Wilson regards this development as a “fascinating sub-text” to the real-life story of the success of The Cement Garden. He also praises the writing generally, citing the marvelous descriptions of French life.

In 2013 Editions Autrement published a new French-language version under the title L'imposteur (The Impostor).

=== Blood For Blood ===
Murder is the theme once again in Blood For Blood (1985), where a prominent barrister, Vivian Winter, is stabbed to death in his flat. Unsuccessful writer Ivor Speke turns detective and uncovers a web of intrigue surrounding Winter's former clients. Patterns emerge and the mystery deepens when Speke delves into the details of Winter's will.

New York Times reviewer John Gross notes that Gloag, with his novels from Our Mother’s House onward, “has established a reputation as a master of the macabre”. Blood For Blood is more of a conventional thriller, he says “…But there are few thrillers that can match its swift and psychologically telling strokes of characterization – and whatever category we assign it to, it remains an exceptionally gripping story.”

=== Only Yesterday ===
A short “drawing-room comedy”, Only Yesterday (1986) involves aged retired architect Oliver, his wife May, their middle-aged son, Rupert and his daughter Miranda. The action takes place over a weekend, when Rupert turns up and announces that he is once again divorcing and leaving his job for no real reason except middle-aged malaise. Miranda, a first-year medical student, also appears, happy that her father has left her militant, feminist mother. “Only Yesterday does a splendid job of defining three generations bound by family ties that are stronger than foolishness, ill will, even meanness.”

== Novels 1990s ==
=== Love as a Foreign Language ===
Set in Paris in 1989 (the bicentenary of the Revolution), Love as a Foreign Language (1991) concerns Connie and Walter, who meet on an English-language teaching course. As they share language exercises and vocabulary games, they fall in love, but the age difference and the concerns of their personal lives work to separate them.

From the Gallimard description (in translation): “Built in brief sequences, punctuated by a series of images, this book recalls the films of Truffaut or Rohmer whose apparent banality covers a great concern for precision, no word left to chance. Few things are said, many are implied or left unresolved. This reflection on the art of living and writing, on the flight of time and the happiness of loving, if it is sometimes tinged with bitterness, never loses its grace or its lightness.”

=== Le passeur de la nuit ===
In Le passeur de la nuit (1996), Aaron is a volunteer for Secours-Amitié (a telephone counselling service similar to the British Samaritans), and he also cares for his sick wife whilst running a bookshop and cataloging the immense library of the wealthy Matilda. Though a good, compassionate man, he is drawn by circumstances into becoming a criminal. The narrative unfolds in part through Aaron's phone conversations with the needy and desperate, and as with Gloag's previous work there are Gothic elements:

From Gallimard: “…the small town near the cliff overlooking the mist-shrouded sea, the recesses of the bookshop where the cat constantly roams, the castle where the femme fatale reigns, with its chambers full of mystery draws a spectral world that bears witness to Julian Gloag's rich imagination.”

=== Chambre d'ombre ===
Gloag's final novel, Chambre d'ombre (1996), was adapted from his teleplay The Dark Room at the suggestion of Paris publisher Editions Autrement. The story involves Edinburgh couple Deb and Greg, who live in a rundown flat with a small baby, and eventually enlist a deaf-mute cleaning lady, Mrs Keats.

From the publisher's description (in translation): “At the centre of this novel, there is silence; heavy, but necessary to silence the unthinkable. Around the silence, characters who, like puppets, play the comedy of life. Banality and madness coexist in a minimalism that the author practises with talent, because extreme pain is said with everyday words.”

== Television plays ==
Gloag has written two teleplays. The first is Only Yesterday, an adaptation of his novel of the same name, directed by Guy Slater and starring Paul Scofield and Wendy Hiller, which was broadcast by the BBC in 1986.

The second is The Dark Room, part of the BBC Play on One series and was broadcast in 1988. It starred Susan Wooldridge and Philip Jackson and was again directed by Guy Slater. The teleplay was later novelized for Editions Autrement as Chambre d'ombre.

== Bibliography ==
=== Novels ===
- Our Mother’s House (1963)
- A Sentence Of Life (1966)
- Maundy (1968)
- Woman Of Character (1973)
- Sleeping Dogs Lie (1980)
- Lost and Found (1981)
- Blood For Blood (1985)
- Only Yesterday (1986)
- Love as a Foreign Language (1991)
- Le passeur de la nuit (1996)
- Chambre d'ombre (1996)

=== Teleplays ===
- Only Yesterday (1986)
- The Dark Room (1987)
