= 1960 Academy Awards =

1960 Academy Awards may refer to:

- 32nd Academy Awards, the Academy Awards ceremony that took place in 1960
- 33rd Academy Awards, the 1961 ceremony honoring the best in film for 1960
