= Martin Stephens (actor) =

British actor and architect (born 1949)

- Born: 19 July 1949 (age 77); Southgate, Middlesex, England
- Occupations: Actor, Architect
- Years active: 1954–1966

Martin Stephens (born 19 July 1949) is a former child actor and architect from England, best known for his performances in the films Village of the Damned and The Innocents. Stephens appeared in 14 films between 1954 and 1966, then chose to retire from acting.

== Career ==
Stephens was born in Southgate, Middlesex on 19 July 1949 and made his first film appearance aged 5 in the 1954 tug-of-love drama The Divided Heart. In 1958 he featured as the young David Copperfield in three episodes of the TV series Tales from Dickens. The same year he returned to the screen in Another Time, Another Place, a sudsy melodrama in which he was cast as the child of Sean Connery and Glynis Johns.

Several more film appearances followed in the next two years before Stephens landed the role which would make him famous. Village of the Damned was a screen adaptation of John Wyndham's science fiction novel The Midwich Cuckoos with Stephens cast as David Zellaby, the leader of a group of sinister hybrid children who are born simultaneously in a quiet country village. The film was shot in six weeks on a budget of £80,000, and distribution company MGM reportedly had little faith in the finished product, believing they had a dud on their hands. There were no press showings, and the film was slipped without any advance publicity into a small number of cinemas in the London area to fill a gap in programming. Much to MGM's surprise, it became an immediate word-of-mouth sensation with large queues forming in advance of each showing. Stephens' eerily chilling performance as a calm and controlling white-haired child without the capacity to feel any human emotion both thrilled and disturbed audiences, leaving a lasting impression on those who saw it. In 2003, English broadcaster Alan Dein noted: "Children were your friends, they were fun. But not this lot. This was the first time any of us had ever seen scary children, really bad seeds, and he was the scariest of the lot. That boy gave me nightmares." Stephens himself recalled: "I knew it was an unusual part. I quietly liked it...having these very adult qualities and having control over the adult. Imagine having that power."

In 1961, Stephens appeared in a smaller part in The Hellfire Club before landing another starring role in The Innocents, a screen version of the famously ambiguous Henry James novel The Turn of the Screw. Cast as the precocious and strangely knowing Miles, he gave another unsettling performance as a disturbed and prematurely sexualised child, notably in the famous "goodnight kiss" scene with Deborah Kerr. This proved to be Stephens' last film for several years, as his parents withdrew him from acting to concentrate on his education. He later said: "It was just accepted wisdom within my family: boarding school and the end of the acting career. I was a very malleable child. Which is probably why I was reasonably good in films, because I was very directable."

Stephens returned to the screen in 1965, as one of the two siblings, the other played by Olivia Hussey, who travel from England to Italy to bring home their errant mother (Maureen O'Hara) in The Battle of the Villa Fiorita.

His final film appearance came in the indifferently-received Hammer Films production The Witches in 1966.

By this time, the appeal of acting had worn off, and Stephens decided to give up the profession to study architecture at Queen's University Belfast. Stephens went on to have a career as an architect. He currently lives in Portugal.

== Filmography ==
| Year | Title | Role | Notes |
|---|---|---|---|
| 1954 | The Divided Heart | Hans | |
| 1958 | Another Time, Another Place | Brian Trevor | |
| 1958 | Law and Disorder | Minor Role | Uncredited |
| 1958 | Harry Black | Michael Tanner | |
| 1958 | Passionate Summer | Alan | Uncredited |
| 1959 | Count Your Blessings | Sigismond | |
| 1959 | The Witness | Peter Brindon | |
| 1959 | Please Turn Over | Boy | Uncredited |
| 1959 | A Touch of Larceny | John Holland | |
| 1960 | Village of the Damned | David Zellaby | |
| 1960 | No Kidding | Angus | |
| 1961 | The Hellfire Club | Jason Junior | |
| 1961 | Murder, She Said | Alexander | Voice, Uncredited |
| 1961 | The Innocents | Miles | |
| 1965 | The Battle of the Villa Fiorita | Michael | |
| 1966 | The Witches | Ronnie Dowsett | (final film role) |

== Bibliography ==
- Holmstrom, John. The Moving Picture Boy: An International Encyclopaedia from 1895 to 1995. Norwich, Michael Russell, 1996, p. 272-273.
