= William Archibald (playwright) =

Trinidadian-born playwright, dancer, choreographer and director (1917 – 1970)

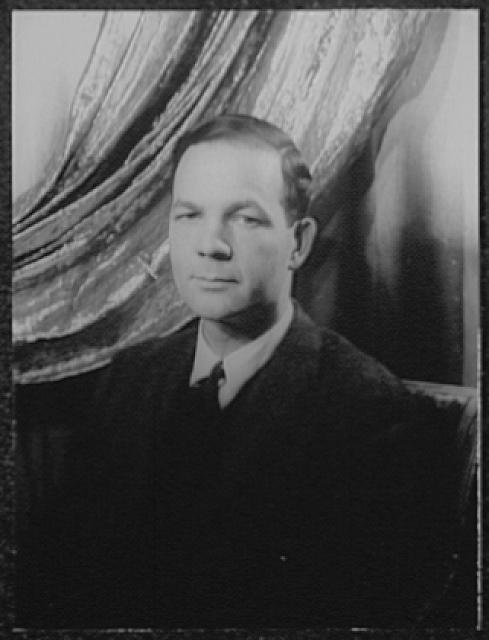
William Archibald (1956) Photo by Carl Van Vechten

William Archibald (7 March 1917 – 27 December 1970) was a Trinidadian-born playwright, dancer, choreographer and director, whose stage adaptation of Henry James' The Turn of the Screw was made into the 1961 British horror film The Innocents.

== Biography ==
Born John William Wharton Archibald in Trinidad of European descent, Archibald was educated at St Mary's College in Port-of-Spain.

Leaving Trinidad in 1937, Archibald enrolled at the Academy of Allied Arts in New York to study dance, making his Broadway début as a principal in the revue One for the Money. Archibald produced his first saleable stage writing for the choreographer Charles Weidman: a verse accompaniment for On My Mother's Side. He also wrote the text for José Limón's War Lyrics.

In 1945, Archibald wrote the book and lyrics for Carib Song, which was staged at the Adelphi Theatre with choreography by Katherine Dunham and a score by Baldwin Bergersen. Archibald then went on to write another musical, three plays and the libretto for a ballet opera: Bay Harbour. His first play, The Innocents, based on the Henry James novella The Turn of the Screw, opened on Broadway in 1950. With Truman Capote he wrote the screenplay for the 1961 film, winning an Edgar Award for Best Motion Picture Screenplay from the Mystery Writers of America. Archibald also co-wrote, with George Tabori, the script for the Alfred Hitchcock film I Confess.

William Archibald died on 27 December 1970 in New York of infectious hepatitis.

His brother was Trinidadian playwright and historical writer Douglas (Jack) Archibald.
