= Jeremy Brooks =

British writer

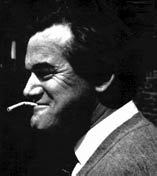
- Born: Jeremy Clive Meikle Brooks; 17 December 1926; Southampton, England
- Died: 27 June 1994 (aged 67); Llanfrothen, Gwynedd, North Wales
- Occupation: Writer
- Spouse: Eleanor Brooks

Jeremy Brooks (17 December 1926 – 27 June 1994) was a novelist, poet, and dramatist. He is best known for his novels (particularly Jampot Smith, Henry's War and Smith, As Hero) and for his stage adaptations of classic works, particularly a series of Maxim Gorky plays for the Royal Shakespeare Company. His novels were praised for their lyricism and for their "Chekhovian mixture of comic concision and pathos". Anthony Burgess, in The Novel Now said "Jeremy Brooks has come to considerable stature in Jampot Smith and Smith, as Hero: he has created one of the few really large picaresque characters in the post-war novel."

== Life and work ==
Jeremy Brooks was born in Southampton in 1926 and went to Brighton Grammar School until, with the onset of World War II, he was evacuated with his family to Llandudno in North Wales, where he attended John Bright school. School was followed immediately by military training and service in the Navy, where he saw the last years of the war from the deck of a minesweeper in the Mediterranean (an experience that provided material for his novel, Smith, As Hero).

After the war Brooks went on a navy scholarship to Oxford, where his English tutor was C. S. Lewis. He then attended Camberwell School of Art, where his wife, the painter Eleanor Brooks (née Nevile), was also a student (although they did not meet at that time). He and Eleanor were married in 1950 and, after a spell on a Houseboat on the Thames, they eventually set up home in a near-derelict and remote cottage in North Wales on the estate of Clough Williams Ellis (the architect and creator of the Portmeirion hotel), where his wife still lives.

Throughout the fifties, living in near-poverty with three young children, Brooks pursued his writing. Critical success came with his second novel, Jampot Smith (recently republished in the Library of Wales classics series). This led to opportunities for paid work and the family eventually moved to London, with the manuscript of his third novel (Henry's War, 1962) lying on the back shelf of the car (where a bottle of his wife's ink slowly seeped into it for the duration of the journey, obliterating all but the edges of each page of tissue-thin typing paper – a disaster that Brooks later said had resulted in a better book).

Now settled in London, Brooks wrote his fourth novel (Smith, As Hero, 1964) and worked for New Statesman, The Sunday Times and the Royal Shakespeare Company at the Aldwych, becoming Literary Manager there in 1964. As such, he was closely involved with the important figures of the theatre world throughout much of the sixties and seventies, particularly Peter Hall and Trevor Nunn, but also David Jones, Terry Hands, Adrian Noble, Clifford Williams, David Hare, David Edgar.

This was a period of great upheaval in establishment theatre, with ground-breaking productions coming thick and fast (Peter Brook's Midsummer Night's Dream and Marat-Sade; works by Harold Pinter and Edward Bond; As You Like It with an all-male cast; Tom Stoppard's Rosencrantz and Guildenstern Are Dead) and the politics of the counter culture sometimes interfering with the smooth running of the RSC. For Brooks the writer, this was too much distraction and he left the RSC sometime in the early seventies to concentrate on his own projects (among them an unfinished manuscript that deals in a highly personal and semi-fictionalised way with his time at the RSC). During all this time and on through the eighties, Brooks directed his creative energies largely towards theatre and film projects. He had never made any money from his novels (not even from Smith As Hero which spent time on the best-seller lists) and now with a family of four children, he needed to earn. He wrote screenplays (Our Mother's House; Work is a Four Letter Word); television scripts for directors such as Karel Reisz and Ken Loach and a great number of important and memorable adaptations of classics for the stage (The Lower Depths, The Government Inspector (with Paul Scofield), Enemies (with a young Helen Mirren), The Forest, A Child's Christmas in Wales (co-written with Adrian Mitchell), The Cherry Orchard, Medea, The Wind in the Willows and many more). The majority of these were for the RSC, where he worked closely with the director David Jones, but in later life he formed a fruitful relationship with Theatre Clwyd at Mold. This took him back to North Wales, where he died in 1994.

Throughout his life, Brooks also wrote poetry (as a schoolboy he had won an Eisteddfod poetry competition) and although during the 1950s many of his poems were published in poetry magazines such as Elegebra, he subsequently never sought its publication, poetry being, for him, a very personal and private pursuit. Moreover, only his earlier poetic work survives (collected in a privately published edition, Wales 1950, Rugosa Press, 2008), an unpublished collection of his poems written throughout the 1960s having been stolen and never recovered.

== Novels ==
- The Water Carnival, 1957
- Jampot Smith, 1960
- Henry's War, 1962
- Smith, As Hero, 1964
- Doing the Voices (collection of short novellas), 1986
- (for children) The Magic Perambulator, 1965

== Poetry ==
- Wales, 1950, 2008

== Screenplays ==
- Our Mother's House, 1967
- Work is a Four Letter Word, 1968

== Television ==
- Days in the Trees, from a stage play by Marguerite Duras
- Enemies, from a stage play by Maxim Gorky, for American Public Service TV
- An Artist's Story, from a short story by Anton Chekhov, directed by David Jones
- On the High Road, from a short story by Chekhov, dir. Karel Reisz
- A Misfortune, from a short story by Chekhov, dir. Ken Loach
- The Grand Inquisitor, from Dostoevsky's The Brothers Karamazov, with Kitty Hunter-Blair
- Death Happens to Other People, an original television play

== Stage adaptations ==
- Nikolai Gogol's The Government Inspector, for the RSC, directed by Peter Hall, starring Paul Scofield.
- Maxim Gorky (all from literal translations by Kitty Hunter-Blair): Enemies, for the RSC, dir. David Jones; The Lower Depths, for the RSC, dir. David Jones; Summerfolk, for the RSC, dir. David Jones; The Zykov’s, for the RSC, dir. David Jones; Children of the Sun, for the RSC, dir. Terry Hands; Barbarians, for BAM Theatre, Brooklyn, dir. David Jones
- Anton Chekhov's Ivanov (with Kitty Hunter-Blair), for the RSC, dir. David Jones.
- Ibsen's Rosmersholm, for the Haymarlet Theatre, dir. Clifford Williams.
- Strindberg's Comrades, for the RSC at The Place, dir. Barry Kyle.
- Alexander Solzhenitsyn's The Love Girl and the Innocent (with Kitty Hunter-Blair), for the RSC.
- Alexander Ostrovsky's The Forest (with Kitty Hunter-Blair), for the RSC at The Other Place, dir. Adrian Noble. Transferred to the Warehouse Theatre, then to the Aldwych.
- Dylan Thomas's A Child's Christmas in Wales (with Adrian Mitchell), dramatised version of the poem, directed by Clifford Williams.
- Kenneth Graham's The Wind in the Willows, for Theatre Clwyd, Mold, dir. Christopher Sandford.

== Radio ==
- Smith, As Killer, original radio play.
- Just Like Home, original radio play.
- A Light Shines in the Darkness, from an unfinished stage play by Leo Tolstoy
