= The Innocents (1961 film) =

1961 horror film directed by Jack Clayton

- Theatrical release poster
- Directed by: Jack Clayton
- Screenplay by: William Archibald; Truman Capote
- Additional dialogue by: John Mortimer
- Based on: The Innocents by William Archibald; The Turn of the Screw by Henry James
- Produced by: Jack Clayton
- Starring: Deborah Kerr; Peter Wyngarde; Megs Jenkins; Michael Redgrave; Pamela Franklin; Martin Stephens
- Cinematography: Freddie Francis
- Edited by: Jim Clark
- Music by: Georges Auric; Daphne Oram
- Production companies: Achilles Film Productions; 20th Century Fox
- Distributed by: 20th Century Fox
- Release dates: 24 November 1961 (London); 15 December 1961 (Los Angeles)
- Running time: 99 minutes
- Countries: United Kingdom; United States
- Language: English
- Budget: £430,000
- Box office: $1.2 million (North America) (US/Canada)

The Innocents is a 1961 gothic psychological horror film directed and produced by Jack Clayton, and starring Deborah Kerr, Michael Redgrave, and Megs Jenkins. Based on the 1898 novella The Turn of the Screw by the novelist Henry James, the screenplay was adapted by William Archibald and Truman Capote, who used Archibald's own 1950 stage play—also titled The Innocents—as a primary source text. Its plot follows a governess who watches over two children and comes to fear that their large estate is haunted by ghosts and that the children are being possessed.

Archibald's original screenplay for The Innocents was based on the premise that the paranormal events depicted were legitimate. Displeased with Archibald's take on the material, director Jack Clayton appointed American writer Truman Capote to rework the script. Capote's rewrites incorporated psychological themes, resulting in a final work that suggests other alternatives to the plot. Filming took place partly on location at the Gothic mansion of Sheffield Park in Sussex, with additional shoots occurring at Shepperton Studios in Surrey. Shot in CinemaScope, The Innocents incorporated bold minimal lighting as well as deep focus, employed by cinematographer Freddie Francis to achieve a distinctive—and sometimes claustrophobic—atmosphere. The film also pioneered the use of synthesised electronic sound created by Daphne Oram. Clayton was dissatisfied with the original score of the movie by French composer Georges Auric and requested some alteration. However, because Auric was not available due to health problems, Clayton turned to W. Lambert Williamson.

The Innocents received international distribution from the American film studio 20th Century Fox, and received its London premiere on 24 November 1961; all to positive critical reviews. It was released in the United States the following month on 15 December in Los Angeles and Christmas Day in New York City. The psychological underpinnings of the film's screenplay have resulted in it being the subject of numerous critical and scholarly essays, particularly in the area of film theory. It was selected by The Guardian as one of the 25 best horror films ever made.

A prequel to the story, The Nightcomers, starring Marlon Brando and Stephanie Beacham, was released in 1971, though to commercial disappointment.

== Plot ==
Miss Giddens applies for her first job as a governess. The wealthy bachelor uncle who interviews her is unconcerned with her lack of experience. He values his freedom to travel and socialise and unabashedly confesses that he has "no room, mentally or emotionally" for his niece and nephew. They were orphaned and left in his care as infants, and he keeps them at Bly, his large country estate. The previous governess, Mary Jessel, died suddenly less than a year earlier. All he cares about is that Miss Giddens accept full responsibility for the children, never troubling him with whatever problems may arise.

At Bly, Miss Giddens is instantly taken with Flora, the niece. She also forges a friendship with Mrs Grose, the kindly housekeeper. The boy, Miles, is away at boarding school, but soon returns to Bly after being expelled for being a "bad influence" on his peers. Mrs Grose says she cannot imagine Miles misbehaving, and when Miss Giddens meets the boy herself, she too thinks his teachers must have exaggerated. He seems charming and mature—though perhaps too mature, with flirtatious flattery towards his governess.

Miss Giddens soon grows disturbed by the children's occasional odd behaviours and secretiveness, and is bothered by disembodied voices and apparitions of a man and woman she witnesses in the house and grounds, whom Mrs Grose identifies from their descriptions as Miss Jessel and the uncle's valet, Peter Quint, also dead. Mrs Grose also reluctantly reveals that the couple had been in an abusive romantic relationship. Miss Giddens concludes that the ghosts of Quint and Miss Jessel possess the bodies of the children so they can physically continue their relationship. She is determined to rescue them from this possession, first planning to break her promise to their uncle and write to him, but she is thwarted by a weeping apparition of Miss Jessel in the schoolroom. She then sends Mrs Grose and Flora to him in London.

Left alone with Miles, Miss Giddens presses him to talk about the ghosts, and about why he was expelled from school. Initially, Miles is glib and evasive, but he eventually admits that he frightened the other boys with violence and vulgar language. She enjoins him to say who taught him this language and behaviour. Miles suddenly begins yelling obscene insults and laughing maniacally, and Quint's face appears in the window behind him, joining in the boy's laughter. Miles then runs outside; Miss Giddens follows, begging him to reveal the name of his influence. Quint appears on a hedge nearby, but Miles does not seem to see him. Miles finally shouts Quint's name, and Quint waves his hand. Miles grows still and falls to the ground. Miss Giddens cradles him and assures him that he is free. She then realises that Miles is dead. Sobbing, she leans over him and kisses him on the lips.

== Cast ==
- Deborah Kerr as Miss Giddens
- Peter Wyngarde as Peter Quint
- Megs Jenkins as Mrs Grose
- Michael Redgrave as the uncle
- Martin Stephens as Miles
- Pamela Franklin as Flora
- Clytie Jessop as Miss Mary Jessel
- Isla Cameron as Anna

== Analysis ==
The Innocents has received attention from academics and specialists in film theory, beginning with the literary theorist Edmund Wilson, who wrote extensively on the film's source novella, insisting that the supernatural phenomena were in fact the product of Miss Giddens' own sexual repression. According to literary scholar Leonard Orr, of the many adaptations of James's work, The Innocents has received the largest amount of critical attention.

Film scholar David J. Hogan reiterated the film's underlying themes of sexual repression becoming the focus of supernatural activity, and compared elements of the film to Robert Wise's The Haunting (1963), based on The Haunting of Hill House by Shirley Jackson. Hogan also interprets the film's final scene as "a perverse variation on the Sleeping Beauty story, as Kerr symbolically liberates the boy from a presumed possession with a kiss after he has fainted."

In the book Fifty Classic British Films, 1932-1982: A Pictorial Record (2013), film writer Anthony Slide noted: "Through the use of shadows, oblique camera angles, and an atmospheric soundtrack, Jack Clayton not only captured the horror of James's story, but also its deeper sadness—the children's isolation from the real world, the governess' problematic sexuality, and the curiously pitiful nature of the former governess, Miss Jessel."

== Production ==
=== Development ===
The original screenplay for The Innocents was adapted by playwright William Archibald from his 1950 play of the same name, which itself was based on Henry James's novella The Turn of the Screw. In both his stage and screen adaptations, Archibald wrote under the assumption that the supernatural experiences of Miss Giddens were real, and that the ghosts she encountered were legitimate entities as opposed to figments of her imagination (a possibility left unresolved in James's original work). Archibald's interpretation of the source material was made clear in a denouement in the original draft of the script, which:

comprises a montage of images superimposed over [Miss Giddens's] reclining figure—the cracked photograph of Quint, Quint on the tower, Flora's hand holding her pet tortoise, a musical box trilling "O Willow Waly." The dream ends with Miss Giddens imagining how the children have been possessed by Miss Jessel...dancing in silhouette with Flora, Quint putting a possessive arm over Miles's shoulder, and Miss Giddens herself praying for deliverance to the sound of a chiming clock.

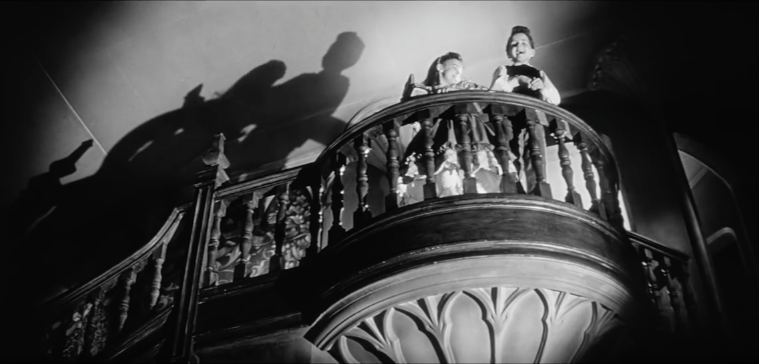
A key point of dispute between Clayton and screenwriter William Archibald was whether the children (pictured) were conduits for malicious spirits, or the phenomena were the invention of the protagonist's mind

Director Jack Clayton envisioned a more ambiguous conclusion for the film: "My original interest in the story was in the fact that one could tell it from a completely different point of view," he said. "In other words–evil was alive in the mind of the governess and in fact she more or less creates the situation. Now this was long before I read the notes on Henry James and found that somebody else also imagines that Henry James wrote it this way—sort of almost Freudian hallucinations the governess had."

Clayton was ultimately unhappy with Archibald's screenplay due to their conflicting interpretations of the material, and asked American writer Truman Capote (whom he had met while working on Beat the Devil) to rework Archibald's script. At the time, Capote was in the middle of writing In Cold Blood; however, because he was a fan of the James novella, he agreed, and took a three-week hiatus to rewrite the screenplay. Capote introduced the Freudian symbolism that is prominently highlighted in the relationships and visual compositions of the film, with implications that the supernatural phenomena experienced by Miss Giddens are a result of her own sexual repression and paranoias rather than legitimate paranormal experiences. Clayton later brought in writer John Mortimer to give the dialogue a "Victorian" polish. Clayton intended to maintain a sense of claustrophobia and, at the same time, open up the play, which took place entirely in the drawing room of the house. Clayton saw the house as one of the characters in the film and used it as such to highlight certain scenes.

Cultural critic Christopher Frayling attributes approximately 90% of the film's script as it appears on the screen to Capote (The final credits attribute the screenplay to Archibald and Capote, with Mortimer receiving credit for "Additional Scenes and Dialogue"). Frayling also notes a Southern Gothic feel present in Capote's script alterations – particularly with the governess' repressed erotic sensibility counterpointed by shots of lush and decaying plants and rapacious insect life. Director Clayton, though, chose to downplay this aspect in the finished film, to preserve the ambiguity between the ghost story and Freudian element. (Note: This paragraph is derived from Christopher Frayling's commentary and the filmed introduction on the British Film Institute (Region 2) DVD released in 2006.)

An unreliable narrator was originally intended to feature in the narrative and the film was to open with a funeral scene. There are stills of the scene that circulated at the time, but Clayton ultimately elected to open the film with darkness, a song sung by a little girl, and the image of Kerr's hands that are clasped in prayer, with her rosary between her fingers, as she murmurs and sobs. Gradually Kerr's face is highlighted. According to film scholar Frayling, the opening scene creates a sense of intimacy and, perhaps, trust that the governess should be trusted, but the use of darkness surrounding her suggests that it is possible that the story that follows could be nothing more than in her own mind – isolated and creating its own supernatural world.

=== Casting ===
Deborah Kerr was cast in the lead role of Miss Giddens at the counsel of the film's studio and distributor, 20th Century Fox, despite the fact that the governess character in James's original work was twenty years old (Kerr was forty at the time). On discussing the part with Clayton, Kerr recalled: "I remember asking Jack what he wanted me to stress in playing the part, and he replied, "You play it the way you feel, but don't forget the ambiguity!" So I tried the very nervous tight-rope between sanity and insanity, and left the audience to exercise its intelligence." Kerr's role in the film is significant, as she appears onscreen in approximately 95 minutes of the film's 99 minute runtime. She was paid US$400,000 for her work in the film.

For the roles of the children, Clayton cast eleven-year-old Pamela Franklin (in her film debut) as Flora, and Martin Stephens as her brother, Miles; Stephens had featured in the Metro-Goldwyn-Mayer horror film Village of the Damned (1960). Australian-born actress Clytie Jessop was cast as the spectral Miss Jessel (also in her film debut), while Peter Wyngarde was cast in the role of Quint, Miss Jessel's illicit lover. Though he receives top billing, Michael Redgrave appears only in the beginning of the film in a cameo role as the children's uncle.

On 19 September 2013, Wyngarde and Jessop were interviewed by Matthew Sweet for a special episode of Night Waves dedicated to the film as part of the BBC Radio 3 programme Sound of Cinema. This episode also featured behind-the-scenes anecdotes provided by Susie Orbach, Christopher Frayling and Jeremy Dyson. During the interview, Wyngarde stated that Alec Guinness and Cary Grant had expressed a strong interest in playing the role of Peter Quint. Jack Clayton turned them down.

=== Filming ===
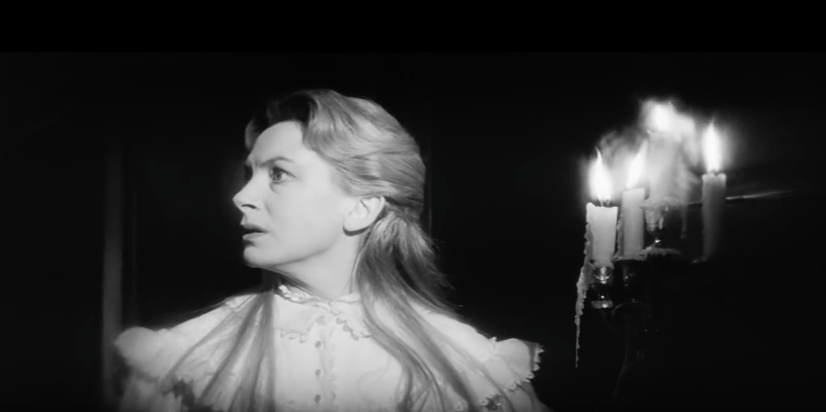
Cinematographer Freddie Francis painted the edges of the lenses for interior night scenes to allow for a more closed-in, claustrophobic sensibility

Clayton wanted the film to be quite different from the Hammer horror films of the period, and employed a number of cinematic devices to achieve this end, including using eerie sound effects and moody, stylised lighting. For the first 45 seconds of the film, the screen is black and singing is heard, and only after this do the credits appear. Clayton, who had previously made films associated with the British New Wave, took on the project specifically to avoid being typecast as a New Wave director, and to work in a different genre.

Filming of The Innocents took place primarily at Shepperton Studios in Surrey. Interior sequences were shot on sound stages at Shepperton, as well as the sequences which took place in the greenhouse veranda; a façade for Bly house was also built by the art department on the studio lot. On-location exterior scenes were shot at the Gothic mansion of Sheffield Park in East Sussex. To ensure that his child actors' performances remained uninhibited, Clayton withheld the full details of the story from Martin Stephens and Pamela Franklin, who only received those parts of the script that lacked the surprising and mysterious adult elements of the film. According to script supervisor Pamela Mann, star Deborah Kerr was specifically attuned to making sure the children "had fun on set". Writer Truman Capote was present during the first several weeks of filming, writing additional dialogue for Stephens and Franklin, and making minor script alterations.

20th Century Fox insisted that The Innocents be shot in CinemaScope, while Clayton wanted to shoot it in standard academy ratio, feeling that he would be unable to make use of the additional space on both sides of the frame. Cinematographer Freddie Francis insisted that he could work with the CinemaScope aspect ratio, having shot Sons and Lovers (1960) for director Jack Cardiff in the format. Francis won the Oscar for Best Cinematographer for his work on the earlier film. He used colour filters and used the lighting rig to create darkness consuming everything at the edge of the frame. As the shoot progressed, Clayton found uses for the edges of the screen and began composing for the CinemaScope format. Francis used deep focus and narrowly aimed the lighting towards the centre of the screen. It was so bright on set in that area that actress Kerr arrived to the set wearing sunglasses one day. Francis and Clayton framed the film in an unusually bold style, with characters prominent at the edge of the frame and their faces at the centre in profile in some sequences, which, again, created both a sense of intimacy and unease, based on the lack of balance in the image. For many of the interior night scenes, Francis painted the sides of the lenses with black paint to allow for a more intense, "elegiac" focus, and used candles custom-made with four to five wicks twined together to produce more light.

During principal photography, Clayton and editor Jim Clark—whom he had hired on the recommendation of his colleague Jimmy Ware, editor of Clayton's first feature, Room At The Top—would meet each evening and view the footage shot that day, assembling daily rough cuts as they progressed; this allowed Clayton to make adjustments and shoot pick-ups along the way, giving him closer supervision during the filming process.

=== Post-production ===
==== Editing ====
Editor Jim Clark manually crafted elaborate cross dissolves in post-production, merging as many as four images in a single frame

In his 2010 memoir Dream Repairman, Jim Clark recalled his work as editor on The Innocents as "a true collaboration" and that he and Clayton became close friends and regular drinking partners during production, since both were single at the time, and lived near each other. He described The Innocents as "a real pleasure to edit, since Jack had a very certain approach to his material, having worked out everything beforehand. He was a perfectionist who left nothing to chance, and was very precise in his approach to work."

Inspired by George Stevens' A Place in the Sun, Clark crafted numerous dissolves and superimpositions, which he also described as "mini montages", in which he edited the cross-fades between certain scenes to run four or five times longer than the standard "mix", and often blended in a third, near-subliminal image; film scholar Anthony Slide would later refer to the film's use of dissolves as "obsessive". Clark achieved this process by using blank film rolls as a template on which he would manually assign Clayton's film negatives with hand-marked reel numbers, slate numbers, and time stamps indicating the duration each image should remain within a single frame. Clayton explained in later interviews that he felt the dissolves entirely appropriate and in accordance with his vision of the film as "mood-oriented", adding: "It gave me opportunities to explore this field, which I had never done before: to create in those multiple dissolves images which hang there, and have a meaning which applies both to the end of the last scene and the beginning of the next."

Clayton maintained close supervision over the editing of the film, specifically making sure that no single scene ran too long; because of the film's small cast, Clayton worried that "if [the film] sags, we've got no other characters to go to". According to Clark, Clayton went through "a lot of anguish" over the final scene, in which Miles dies in Miss Giddens' arms, and that the director was "quite prone to agonizing over scenes if he was uncertain of them, and we would run them over and over again, hardly changing a frame, until he felt reconciled to the sequence." Clayton felt the climactic scene should be "claustrophobic and played very close—developing into violence and savagery". Clark also revealed that, despite their previously harmonious working relationship, he unexpectedly fell out with Clayton just before the film was released, and felt that he had allowed himself to become too close to his director. Clark recalled that on the evening of the pre-release critics' screening, Clayton went into a rage because, through no fault of her own, his personal assistant Jeanie Sims was late in phoning him with the critics' reactions. When Sims called Clark to Clayton's office the next day, he discovered that Clayton had completely smashed a large plaster scale model of Bly House, and was refusing to speak to either of them. In spite of this rift, Clark and Clayton gradually repaired their friendship, and Clayton subsequently invited Clark to edit his next film, The Pumpkin Eater.

==== Music and sound design ====
The original score for The Innocents was composed by Georges Auric, who had scored several films Clayton had been involved with in the past, such as Moulin Rouge (1952) and The Bespoke Overcoat (1956). Clayton was dissatisfied with Auric's final score for The Innocents, and requested he make alterations; however, Auric was unable to do so because of his ailing health, and re-orchestration was completed by W. Lambert Williamson. The film also pioneered the use of synthesised electronic sounds created by Daphne Oram. These "spectral massed sine tones" were incorporated into the film's sound design, though Oram was not credited for them.

The film opens on a black screen as the song "O Willow Waly" by Auric and Paul Dehn is sung. As the song enters its second verse, the opening production logo for 20th Century Fox appears onscreen. The song is used as a motif throughout the film. The song, sung on the soundtrack by Isla Cameron, was released in the United Kingdom on a Decca single in March 1962. It was covered by the Kingston Trio on their 1962 album Something Special.

== Release ==
=== Certification ===
In the United Kingdom, the original classification in 1961 given by the British Board of Film Censors (now the British Board of Film Classification or BBFC) had been the "X" rating, which meant that no person under the age of 16 years would be allowed into the cinema to see it.

=== Box office ===
The Innocents had its world premiere at the Carlton Theatre in London on 24 November 1961. In North America, 20th Century Fox devised a marketing campaign that branded the film a "strange new experience in shock". The film premiered in the United States at the El Rey Theatre in Los Angeles, California on 15 December 1961, and opened in New York City on 25 December 1961, screening at the Criterion Theatre and 72nd Street Playhouse. The film grossed a total of $1.2 million in the United States and Canada. According to Kinematograph Weekly the film was considered a "money maker" at the British box office in 1962.

=== Critical response ===
Contemporary critics were positive about the film. A review published in Time magazine praised Kerr's performance and the film's "dangerous, intelligent darkness", but criticised the screenplay, suggesting that Archibald and Capote's script "unhappily press[es] hard, much harder than James did, for the psychiatric interpretation. They have obviously failed to perceive that in suggesting a normal, everyday basis for supernatural phenomena, they must inevitably relieve the spectator of his nameless horror of what might happen. But isn't horror, when all's said and done, the one important experience this tale is intended to communicate?" In a Variety review, the film was deemed a "high-quality spine-chilling drama". In the summer 1962 issue of Film Quarterly, Pauline Kael called the film "the best ghost movie I have ever seen", praising Kerr's and Stephens' performances as well as Capote's adaptation of the source material. Boyd Martin of The Courier-Journal praised the film as a "spooky chiller... the hypnotic influence is there, and audiences will, I suspect, feel what the governess feels." Conversely, Bosley Crowther wrote a mixed review in The New York Times when the film was first shown in New York City in December 1961: "Mr Clayton and Miss Kerr have neglected to interpret the tale and character with sufficient incisiveness and candor to give us a first-rate horror or psychological film. But they've given us one that still has interest and sends some formidable chills down the spine.".

The film was nominated for two BAFTA Awards, including Best British Film and Best Film. For his direction, Clayton was awarded the National Board of Review Award for Best Director. William Archibald and Truman Capote won a 1962 Edgar Award from the Mystery Writers of America for Best Motion Picture Screenplay. The film was entered into the 1962 Cannes Film Festival.

=== Home media ===
The Innocents received distribution on DVD in the United States through 20th Century Fox Home Entertainment on 6 September 2005. This release also features a Latin American Spanish mono audio track and the film in both widescreen and fullscreen versions. The Criterion Collection released a new edition of the film on DVD and Blu-ray on 23 September 2014. This release features a new 4K transfer, an introduction and audio commentary with cultural critic Christopher Frayling, an interview with cinematographer John Bailey (discussing the work of Freddie Francis), and a 2006 documentary on the making of the film. In the United Kingdom, the film received a Blu-ray release on 23 August 2010 through BFI. Applications for certification since 2000 have led to the film being rated as a "12" or "12A".

== Legacy ==
The Innocents is regarded as a classic psychological horror film. With the British cinematic re-release of The Innocents as part of the BFI's Gothic Season in December 2013, the film has received overwhelmingly positive reviews from contemporary critics. The Innocents holds a 95% "fresh" rating on the internet review aggregator Rotten Tomatoes from a sample of 55 reviews. Its consensus reads, "Creepily atmospheric, The Innocents is a stylishly crafted, chilling British ghost tale with Deborah Kerr at her finest". On Metacritic, the film has a weighted average score of 87 out of 100 based on 17 critics, indicating "universal acclaim".

Peter Bradshaw, film critic for The Guardian, gave the film five out of five stars in December 2013, praising it as an "elegant, sinister and scalp-prickling ghost story". Tim Robey, writing for The Telegraph, also gave the film five out of five stars, recognising the "immaculate" directorial ability of Jack Clayton, and commending the "eerie, coldly beautiful" adaptation of James' novel. Author and film critic Leonard Maltin in 2009 awarded the film three and a half out of a possible four stars, calling it a "first-rate thriller". Director Martin Scorsese placed The Innocents on his list of the 11 scariest horror films of all time. Similarly, Andrew Pulver placed the film at number 11 in The Guardian's list of the best horror films of all time. Time Out named it as the 18th in a list of the 100 greatest British films.

"The Infant Kiss", a song by Kate Bush, from her 1980 album Never for Ever, was inspired by the film. Mexican director Guillermo del Toro cites the film as an influence on his 2015 gothic horror film Crimson Peak.

In 2013, the BFI and Palgrave Macmillan published an extensive behind-the-scenes book written by Christopher Frayling which details the origin and themes behind The Turn of the Screw, the success of the story's many previous adaptations on the stage, opera and television, this film's entire production, its initial release and its impact and recognition in later years. The book also features rare archival material from Jack Clayton's archive such as concept art, handwritten notes by Truman Capote, portions of the original screenplay with deleted scenes and alternate dialogue, film stills (including some which show an alternate opening which was filmed and later discarded before the film's release) and interviews with the cast and crew.

On 4 January 2017, Martin Stephens gave an extensive interview on his career as a child actor during a TEDx episode titled Movies, Marriage and Meditation.

== See also ==
- List of ghost films
- The Haunting of Bly Manor
