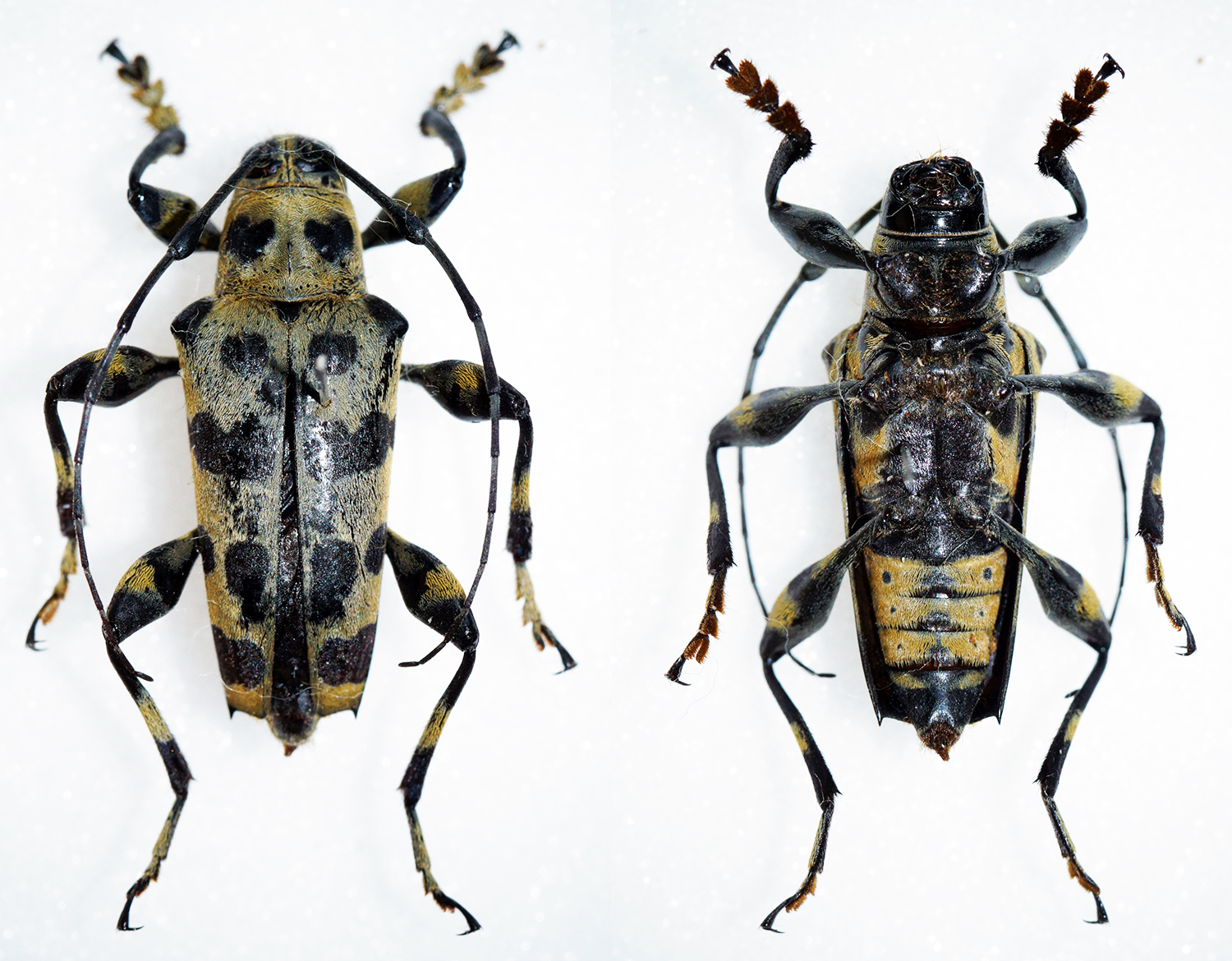

Scientific classification
- Domain: Eukaryota
- Kingdom: Animalia
- Phylum: Arthropoda
- Class: Insecta
- Order: Coleoptera
- Suborder: Polyphaga
- Infraorder: Cucujiformia
- Family: Cerambycidae
- Subfamily: Lamiinae
- Tribe: Colobotheini
- Genus: Carneades
- Species: C. grandis

Binomial name
- Carneades grandis (Thomson, 1860)

Synonyms
- Colobothea grandis Thomson, 1860

= Carneades grandis =

Species of beetle

Carneades grandis is a species of beetle in the family Cerambycidae. It was described by Thomson in 1860. It is known from Belize, Honduras, and Mexico.
