= Carneades delicia =

Scientific classification
- Domain: Eukaryota
- Kingdom: Animalia
- Phylum: Arthropoda
- Class: Insecta
- Order: Coleoptera
- Suborder: Polyphaga
- Infraorder: Cucujiformia
- Family: Cerambycidae
- Subfamily: Lamiinae
- Tribe: Colobotheini
- Genus: Carneades
- Species: C. delicia

Binomial name
- Carneades delicia Bates, 1869

Species of beetle

Carneades delicia is a species of beetle in the family Cerambycidae. It was described by Bates in 1869. It is known from Nicaragua.
