= Carneades quadrinodosa =

Scientific classification
- Domain: Eukaryota
- Kingdom: Animalia
- Phylum: Arthropoda
- Class: Insecta
- Order: Coleoptera
- Suborder: Polyphaga
- Infraorder: Cucujiformia
- Family: Cerambycidae
- Subfamily: Lamiinae
- Tribe: Colobotheini
- Genus: Carneades
- Species: C. quadrinodosa

Binomial name
- Carneades quadrinodosa Aurivillius, 1902

Species of beetle

Carneades quadrinodosa is a species of beetle in the family Cerambycidae. It was described by Per Olof Christopher Aurivillius in 1902. It is known from Colombia.
