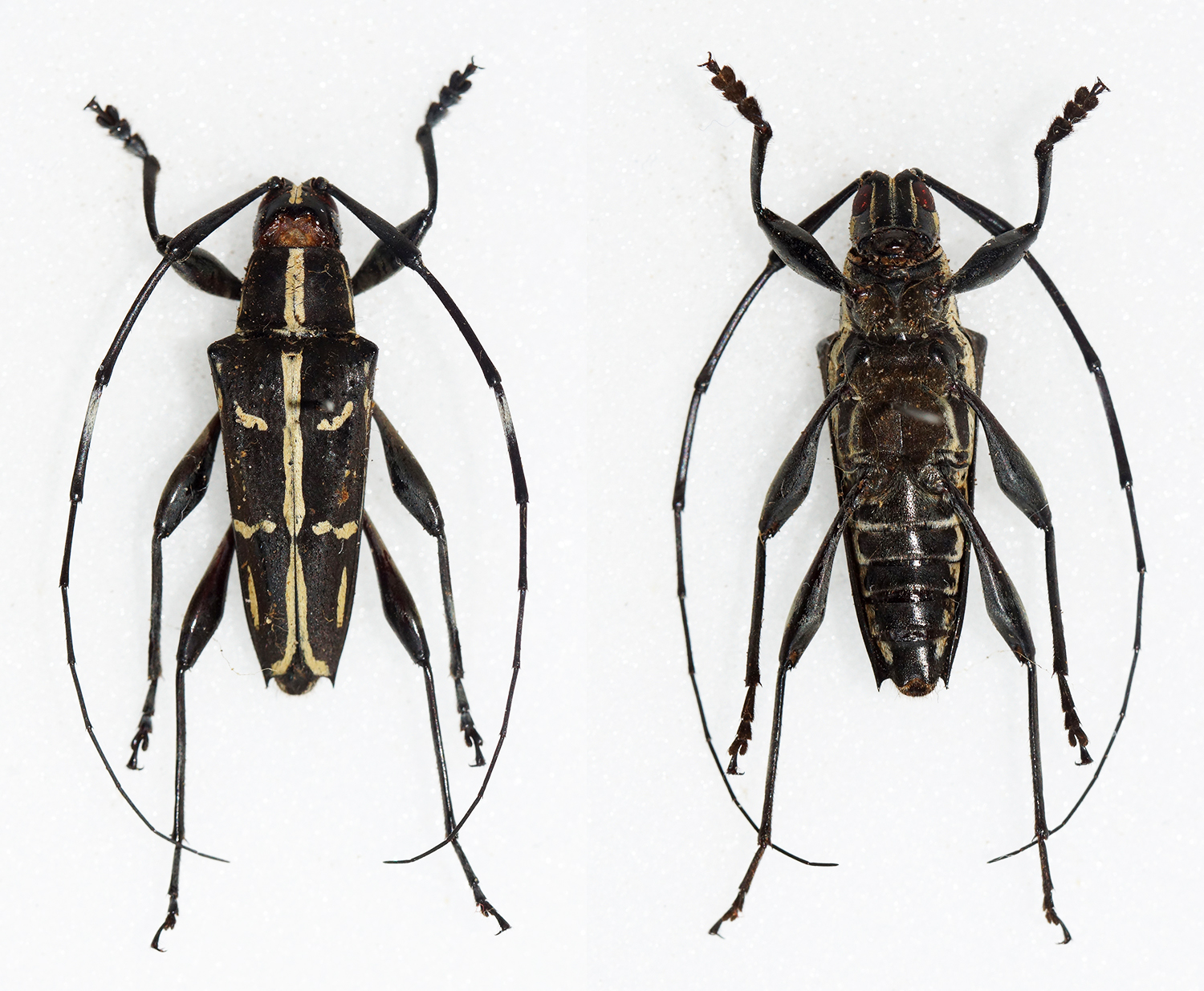

Scientific classification
- Domain: Eukaryota
- Kingdom: Animalia
- Phylum: Arthropoda
- Class: Insecta
- Order: Coleoptera
- Suborder: Polyphaga
- Infraorder: Cucujiformia
- Family: Cerambycidae
- Subfamily: Lamiinae
- Tribe: Colobotheini
- Genus: Carneades
- Species: C. vittata

Binomial name
- Carneades vittata Gahan, 1889

Synonyms
- Colobothea crucigera Aurivillius, 1902

= Carneades vittata =

Species of beetle

Carneades vittata is a species of beetle in the family Cerambycidae. It was described by Gahan in 1889. It is known from Brazil, Ecuador, Bolivia, and Peru.
