= Carneades hemileuca =

Scientific classification
- Domain: Eukaryota
- Kingdom: Animalia
- Phylum: Arthropoda
- Class: Insecta
- Order: Coleoptera
- Suborder: Polyphaga
- Infraorder: Cucujiformia
- Family: Cerambycidae
- Subfamily: Lamiinae
- Tribe: Colobotheini
- Genus: Carneades
- Species: C. hemileuca

Binomial name
- Carneades hemileuca Bates, 1881

Species of beetle

Carneades hemileuca is a species of beetle in the family Cerambycidae. It was described by Bates in 1881. It is known from Costa Rica and Panama.
