= Carneades superba =

Scientific classification
- Domain: Eukaryota
- Kingdom: Animalia
- Phylum: Arthropoda
- Class: Insecta
- Order: Coleoptera
- Suborder: Polyphaga
- Infraorder: Cucujiformia
- Family: Cerambycidae
- Subfamily: Lamiinae
- Tribe: Colobotheini
- Genus: Carneades
- Species: C. superba

Binomial name
- Carneades superba Bates, 1869

Species of beetle

Carneades superba is a species of beetle in the family Cerambycidae. It was described by Bates in 1869. It is known from Costa Rica, Honduras, Panama and Nicaragua.
