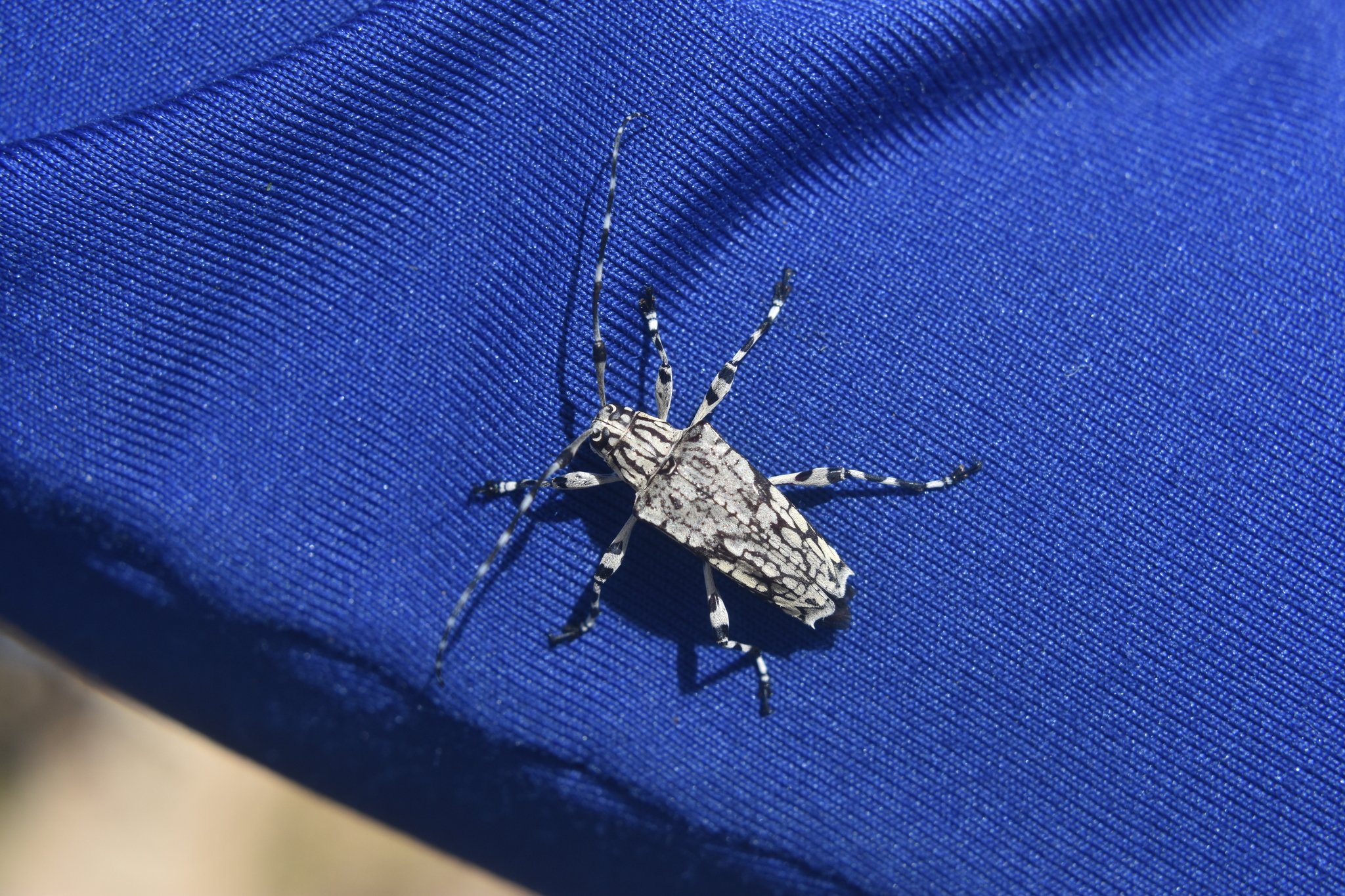
- Lophobothea reticulata, Colombia

Scientific classification
- Kingdom: Animalia
- Phylum: Arthropoda
- Class: Insecta
- Order: Coleoptera
- Suborder: Polyphaga
- Infraorder: Cucujiformia
- Family: Cerambycidae
- Subfamily: Lamiinae
- Tribe: Colobotheini
- Genus: Lophobothea
- Species: L. reticulata

Binomial name
- Lophobothea reticulata (Bates, 1881)

Synonyms
- Carneades reticulata Bates, 1881

= Lophobothea reticulata =

Species of beetle

Lophobothea reticulata is a species of long-horned beetle in the family Cerambycidae. It is found in Colombia.
