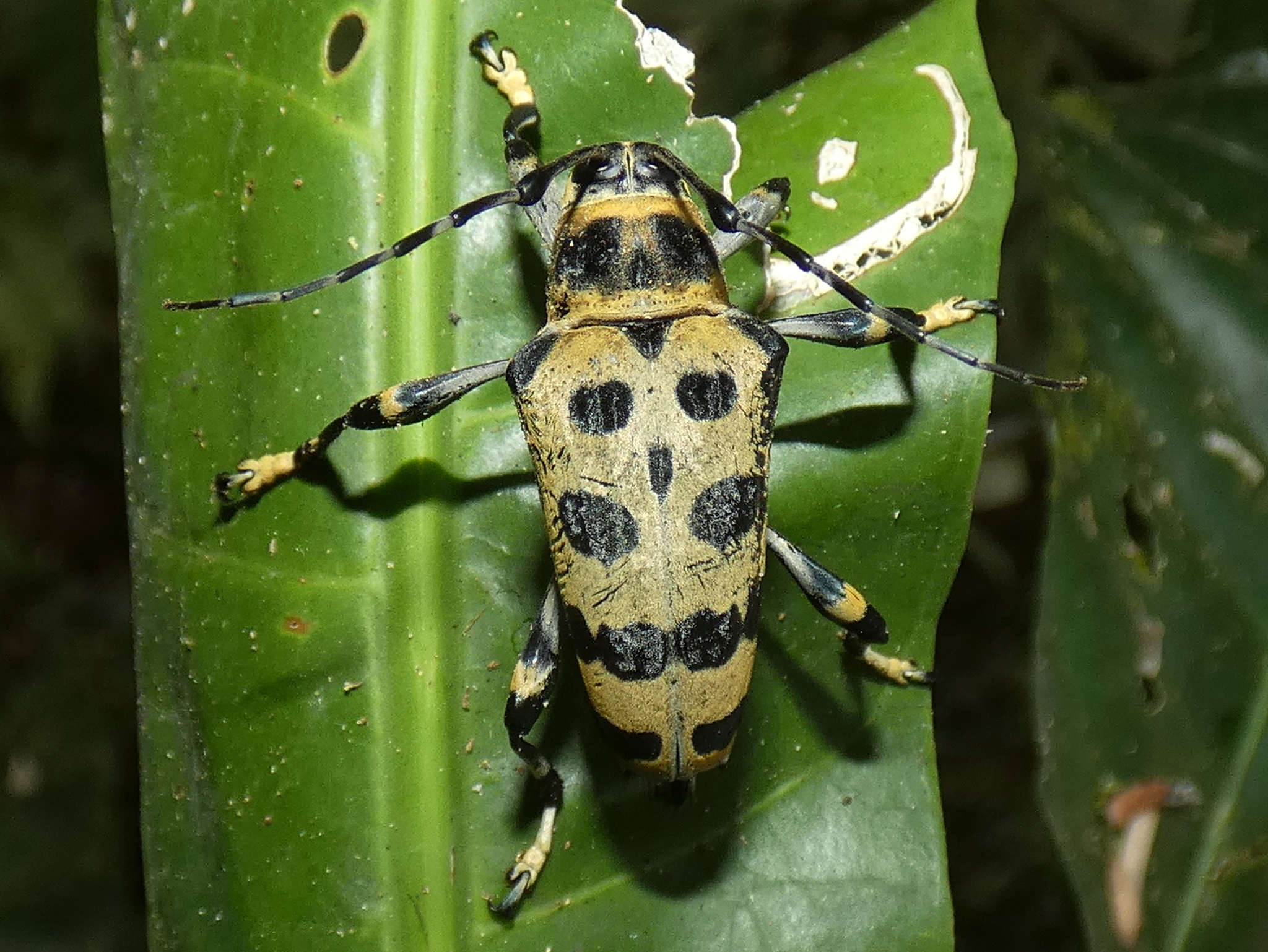

Scientific classification
- Kingdom: Animalia
- Phylum: Arthropoda
- Clade: Pancrustacea
- Class: Insecta
- Order: Coleoptera
- Suborder: Polyphaga
- Infraorder: Cucujiformia
- Family: Cerambycidae
- Subfamily: Lamiinae
- Tribe: Colobotheini
- Genus: Carneades
- Species: C. championi

Binomial name
- Carneades championi Bates, 1885

= Carneades championi =

Species of beetle

Carneades championi is a species of beetle in the family Cerambycidae. It was described by Henry Walter Bates in 1885. It is known from Costa Rica and Panamá.
