= Carneades glaucothea =

Scientific classification
- Domain: Eukaryota
- Kingdom: Animalia
- Phylum: Arthropoda
- Class: Insecta
- Order: Coleoptera
- Suborder: Polyphaga
- Infraorder: Cucujiformia
- Family: Cerambycidae
- Subfamily: Lamiinae
- Tribe: Colobotheini
- Genus: Carneades
- Species: C. glaucothea

Binomial name
- Carneades glaucothea Bates, 1872

Synonyms
- Colobothea subcrucigera Zajciw, 1961

Species of beetle

Carneades glaucothea is a species of beetle in the family Cerambycidae. It was described by Bates in 1872. It is known from Brazil, Ecuador and Peru.
