= Carneades bicincta =

Scientific classification
- Domain: Eukaryota
- Kingdom: Animalia
- Phylum: Arthropoda
- Class: Insecta
- Order: Coleoptera
- Suborder: Polyphaga
- Infraorder: Cucujiformia
- Family: Cerambycidae
- Subfamily: Lamiinae
- Tribe: Colobotheini
- Genus: Carneades
- Species: C. bicincta

Binomial name
- Carneades bicincta Gahan, 1889

Species of beetle

Carneades bicincta is a species of beetle in the family Cerambycidae. It was described by Gahan in 1889. It is known from Guadeloupe.
