= Cathexis (disambiguation) =

Cathexis may also refer to:

- cathexis, psychoanalytical concept
- Cathexis (beetle), a genus of longhorn beetles
- Cathexis (Star Trek: Voyager), the 12th episode of Star Trek: Voyager
- Cathexis (comics), a race of sixth-dimensional beings from the DC Universe
- Cathexis (Typeface), a Typeface (font) designed by Jason Walcott as part of the Jukebox Font library.
