= Apechthes =

Scientific classification
- Kingdom: Animalia
- Phylum: Arthropoda
- Class: Insecta
- Order: Coleoptera
- Suborder: Polyphaga
- Infraorder: Cucujiformia
- Family: Cerambycidae
- Tribe: Colobotheini
- Genus: Apechthes; Thomson, 1861

Genus of beetles

Apechthes is a genus of longhorn beetles of the subfamily Lamiinae.

- Apechthes championi Bates, 1881
- Apechthes mexicanus Thomson, 1861
