= Sparna =

Scientific classification
- Domain: Eukaryota
- Kingdom: Animalia
- Phylum: Arthropoda
- Class: Insecta
- Order: Coleoptera
- Suborder: Polyphaga
- Infraorder: Cucujiformia
- Family: Cerambycidae
- Subfamily: Lamiinae
- Tribe: Colobotheini
- Genus: Sparna; Thomson, 1864

Species
- See text

Genus of beetles

Sparna is a genus of longhorn beetles of the tribe Colobotheini.

== Species ==
Accepted species:

- Sparna bosqi Gilmour, 1954
- Sparna colombiana Gilmour, 1950
- Sparna lycoides Thomson, 1864
- Sparna macilenta Pascoe, 1888
- Sparna migsominea Gilmour, 1950
- Sparna nigrolineata Fuchs, 1956
- Sparna pallida Gilmour, 1950
- Sparna platyptera Bates, 1881
