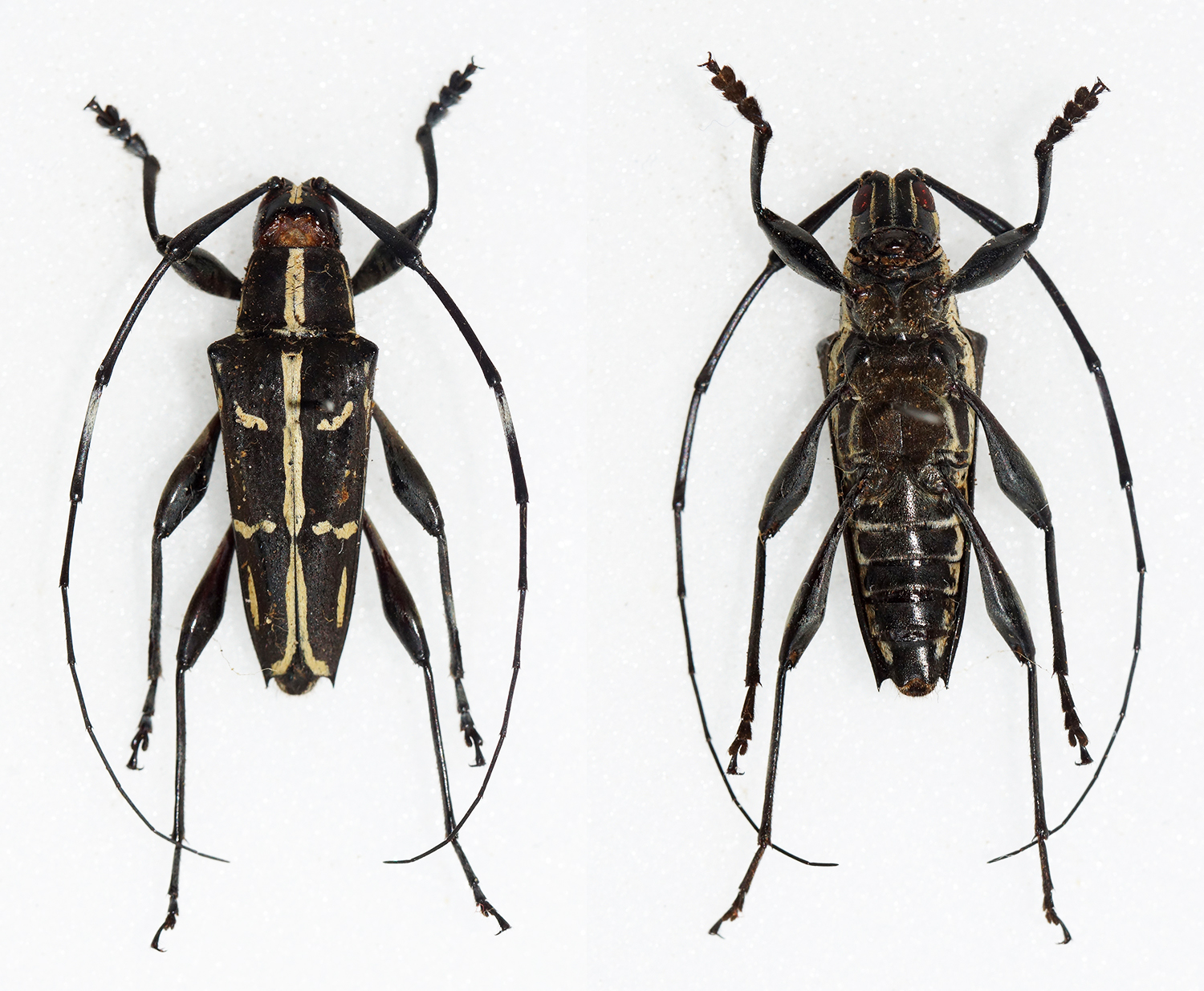
- Carneades vittata

Scientific classification
- Kingdom: Animalia
- Phylum: Arthropoda
- Class: Insecta
- Order: Coleoptera
- Suborder: Polyphaga
- Infraorder: Cucujiformia
- Family: Cerambycidae
- Subfamily: Lamiinae
- Tribe: Colobotheini
- Genus: Carneades; Bates, 1869

= Carneades (beetle) =

Genus of beetles

Carneades is a genus of long-horned beetles in the subfamily Lamiinae. There are about 15 described species in Carneades, found in Mexico, Central America, and South America.

== Species ==
These 15 species belong to the genus Carneades:

- Carneades bicincta Gahan, 1889 (Guadeloupe)
- Carneades championi Bates, 1885 (Costa Rica and Panama)
- Carneades delicia Bates, 1869 (Nicaragua)
- Carneades flavomaculata Touroult, 2017 (Martinique)
- Carneades glaucothea Bates, 1872 (Brazil, Ecuador, and Peru)
- Carneades grandis (Thomson, 1860) (Belize, Guatemala, Honduras, and Mexico)
- Carneades hemileuca Bates, 1881 (Costa Rica and Panama)
- Carneades nigrosignata Aurivillius, 1925 (Bolivia)
- Carneades personata Bates, 1881 (Colombia)
- Carneades princeps Bates, 1872 (Costa Rica, Nicaragua, and Panama)
- Carneades quadrinodosa Aurivillius, 1902 (Colombia and Panama)
- Carneades superba Bates, 1869 (Costa Rica, Honduras, Nicaragua, and Panama)
- Carneades vigneaulti Galileo et al., 2014 (Bolivia)
- Carneades viridiaurata Audureau, 2022 (Peru)
- Carneades vittata Gahan, 1889 (Bolivia, Brazil, Ecuador, and Peru)
