= Carterica =

Scientific classification
- Kingdom: Animalia
- Phylum: Arthropoda
- Class: Insecta
- Order: Coleoptera
- Suborder: Polyphaga
- Infraorder: Cucujiformia
- Family: Cerambycidae
- Subfamily: Lamiinae
- Tribe: Colobotheini
- Genus: Carterica; Pascoe, 1858

Genus of beetles

Carterica is a genus of longhorn beetles of the subfamily Lamiinae.

- Carterica buquetii Thomson, 1860
- Carterica cincticornis Bates, 1865
- Carterica mima Belon, 1903
- Carterica mucronata (Olivier, 1795)
- Carterica pygmaea Bates, 1881
- Carterica rubra Martins & Galileo, 2005
- Carterica soror Belon, 1896
- Carterica tricuspis Belon, 1903
