= Sangaris viridipennis =

Scientific classification
- Kingdom: Animalia
- Phylum: Arthropoda
- Class: Insecta
- Order: Coleoptera
- Suborder: Polyphaga
- Infraorder: Cucujiformia
- Family: Cerambycidae
- Genus: Sangaris
- Species: S. viridipennis

Binomial name
- Sangaris viridipennis Melzer, 1931

Species of beetle

Sangaris viridipennis is a species of beetle in the family Cerambycidae. It was described by Melzer in 1931. It is known from Brazil.
