= Nodubothea nodicornis =

Scientific classification
- Domain: Eukaryota
- Kingdom: Animalia
- Phylum: Arthropoda
- Class: Insecta
- Order: Coleoptera
- Suborder: Polyphaga
- Infraorder: Cucujiformia
- Family: Cerambycidae
- Genus: Nodubothea
- Species: N. nodicornis

Binomial name
- Nodubothea nodicornis (Bates, 1881)

Synonyms
- Carneades nodicornis Bates, 1881; Trachysomus huamboyae Kirsch, 1889

Species of beetle

Nodubothea nodicornis is a species of beetle in the family Cerambycidae. It was described by Bates in 1881. It is known from Colombia and Ecuador.
