= Sangaris luctuosa =

Scientific classification
- Kingdom: Animalia
- Phylum: Arthropoda
- Class: Insecta
- Order: Coleoptera
- Suborder: Polyphaga
- Infraorder: Cucujiformia
- Family: Cerambycidae
- Genus: Sangaris
- Species: S. luctuosa

Binomial name
- Sangaris luctuosa (Pascoe, 1859)

Synonyms
- Colobothea luctuosa Pascoe, 1859

Species of beetle

Sangaris luctuosa is a species of beetle in the family Cerambycidae. It was described by Pascoe in 1859. It is known from Brazil.
