= Sympleurotis albofasciatus =

Scientific classification
- Kingdom: Animalia
- Phylum: Arthropoda
- Class: Insecta
- Order: Coleoptera
- Suborder: Polyphaga
- Infraorder: Cucujiformia
- Family: Cerambycidae
- Genus: Sympleurotis
- Species: S. albofasciatus

Binomial name
- Sympleurotis albofasciatus Julio & Monné, 2005

Species of beetle

Sympleurotis albofasciatus is a species of beetle in the family Cerambycidae. It was described by Julio and Monné in 2005. It is known from Mexico.
