= Sparna platyptera =

Scientific classification
- Domain: Eukaryota
- Kingdom: Animalia
- Phylum: Arthropoda
- Class: Insecta
- Order: Coleoptera
- Suborder: Polyphaga
- Infraorder: Cucujiformia
- Family: Cerambycidae
- Genus: Sparna
- Species: S. platyptera

Binomial name
- Sparna platyptera Bates, 1881

Species of beetle

Sparna platyptera is a species of longhorn beetle (family Cerambycidae). It was described by Henry Walter Bates in 1881. It is known from Brazil.
