= Sangaris laeta =

Scientific classification
- Kingdom: Animalia
- Phylum: Arthropoda
- Class: Insecta
- Order: Coleoptera
- Suborder: Polyphaga
- Infraorder: Cucujiformia
- Family: Cerambycidae
- Genus: Sangaris
- Species: S. laeta

Binomial name
- Sangaris laeta (Bates, 1881)

Species of beetle

Sangaris laeta is a species of beetle in the family Cerambycidae. It was described by Henry Walter Bates in 1881. It is known from Ecuador.
