= Sangaris albida =

Scientific classification
- Kingdom: Animalia
- Phylum: Arthropoda
- Class: Insecta
- Order: Coleoptera
- Suborder: Polyphaga
- Infraorder: Cucujiformia
- Family: Cerambycidae
- Genus: Sangaris
- Species: S. albida

Binomial name
- Sangaris albida Monné, 1993

Species of beetle

Sangaris albida is a species of beetle in the family Cerambycidae. It was described by Monné in 1993. It is known from Brazil.
