= Sangaris penrosei =

Scientific classification
- Kingdom: Animalia
- Phylum: Arthropoda
- Class: Insecta
- Order: Coleoptera
- Suborder: Polyphaga
- Infraorder: Cucujiformia
- Family: Cerambycidae
- Genus: Sangaris
- Species: S. penrosei

Binomial name
- Sangaris penrosei Hovore, 1998

Species of beetle

Sangaris penrosei is a species of beetle in the family Cerambycidae. It was described by Hovore in 1998. It is known from Panama.
