= Sparna colombiana =

Scientific classification
- Domain: Eukaryota
- Kingdom: Animalia
- Phylum: Arthropoda
- Class: Insecta
- Order: Coleoptera
- Suborder: Polyphaga
- Infraorder: Cucujiformia
- Family: Cerambycidae
- Genus: Sparna
- Species: S. colombiana

Binomial name
- Sparna colombiana Gilmour, 1950

Species of beetle

Sparna colombiana is a species of beetle in the family Cerambycidae. It was described by Gilmour in 1950. It is known from Colombia, from which its species epithet is derived.
