= Sparna macilenta =

Scientific classification
- Domain: Eukaryota
- Kingdom: Animalia
- Phylum: Arthropoda
- Class: Insecta
- Order: Coleoptera
- Suborder: Polyphaga
- Infraorder: Cucujiformia
- Family: Cerambycidae
- Genus: Sparna
- Species: S. macilenta

Binomial name
- Sparna macilenta Pascoe, 1888

Species of beetle

Sparna macilenta is a species of beetle in the family Cerambycidae. It was described by Pascoe in 1888. It is known from Ecuador and Colombia.
