= Sangaris obtusicarinata =

Scientific classification
- Kingdom: Animalia
- Phylum: Arthropoda
- Class: Insecta
- Order: Coleoptera
- Suborder: Polyphaga
- Infraorder: Cucujiformia
- Family: Cerambycidae
- Genus: Sangaris
- Species: S. obtusicarinata

Binomial name
- Sangaris obtusicarinata (Zajciw, 1962)

Synonyms
- Colobothea obtusicarinata Zajciw, 1962

Species of beetle

Sangaris obtusicarinata is a species of beetle in the family Cerambycidae. It was described by Dmytro Zajciw in 1962. It is known from Brazil.
