= Carterica mima =

Scientific classification
- Kingdom: Animalia
- Phylum: Arthropoda
- Class: Insecta
- Order: Coleoptera
- Suborder: Polyphaga
- Infraorder: Cucujiformia
- Family: Cerambycidae
- Genus: Carterica
- Species: C. mima

Binomial name
- Carterica mima Belon, 1903

Species of beetle

Carterica mima is a species of beetle in the family Cerambycidae. It was described by Belon in 1903. It is known from Peru and Bolivia.
