= Sangaris spilota =

Scientific classification
- Kingdom: Animalia
- Phylum: Arthropoda
- Class: Insecta
- Order: Coleoptera
- Suborder: Polyphaga
- Infraorder: Cucujiformia
- Family: Cerambycidae
- Genus: Sangaris
- Species: S. spilota

Binomial name
- Sangaris spilota Martins & Galileo, 2009

Species of beetle

Sangaris spilota is a species of beetle in the family Cerambycidae. It was described by Martins and Galileo in 2009.
