= Sympleurotis rudis =

Scientific classification
- Kingdom: Animalia
- Phylum: Arthropoda
- Class: Insecta
- Order: Coleoptera
- Suborder: Polyphaga
- Infraorder: Cucujiformia
- Family: Cerambycidae
- Genus: Sympleurotis
- Species: S. rudis

Binomial name
- Sympleurotis rudis Bates, 1881

Species of beetle

Sympleurotis rudis is a species of beetle in the family Cerambycidae. It was described by Bates in 1881. Costa Rica, Honduras, Guatemala, Mexico, and Panama.
