= Sympleurotis armatus =

Scientific classification
- Kingdom: Animalia
- Phylum: Arthropoda
- Class: Insecta
- Order: Coleoptera
- Suborder: Polyphaga
- Infraorder: Cucujiformia
- Family: Cerambycidae
- Genus: Sympleurotis
- Species: S. armatus

Binomial name
- Sympleurotis armatus Gahan, 1892

Species of beetle

Sympleurotis armatus is a species of beetle in the family Cerambycidae. It was described by Gahan in 1892. It is known from Mexico and Panama.
