= Carterica pygmaea =

Scientific classification
- Kingdom: Animalia
- Phylum: Arthropoda
- Class: Insecta
- Order: Coleoptera
- Suborder: Polyphaga
- Infraorder: Cucujiformia
- Family: Cerambycidae
- Genus: Carterica
- Species: C. pygmaea

Binomial name
- Carterica pygmaea Bates, 1881

Species of beetle

Carterica pygmaea is a species of beetle in the family Cerambycidae. It was described by Bates in 1881. It is known from Costa Rica, Nicaragua, and Panama.
