= Carterica cincticornis =

Scientific classification
- Kingdom: Animalia
- Phylum: Arthropoda
- Class: Insecta
- Order: Coleoptera
- Suborder: Polyphaga
- Infraorder: Cucujiformia
- Family: Cerambycidae
- Genus: Carterica
- Species: C. cincticornis

Binomial name
- Carterica cincticornis Bates, 1865

Species of beetle

Carterica cincticornis is a species of beetle in the family Cerambycidae. It was described by Bates in 1865. It is known from Brazil, Colombia and Ecuador.
