= Carterica buquetii =

Scientific classification
- Kingdom: Animalia
- Phylum: Arthropoda
- Class: Insecta
- Order: Coleoptera
- Suborder: Polyphaga
- Infraorder: Cucujiformia
- Family: Cerambycidae
- Genus: Carterica
- Species: C. buquetii

Binomial name
- Carterica buquetii Thomson, 1860

Synonyms
- Carterica buqueti Thomson, 1860

Species of beetle

Carterica buquetii is a species of beetle in the family Cerambycidae. It was described by Thomson in 1860. It is known from Brazil.
