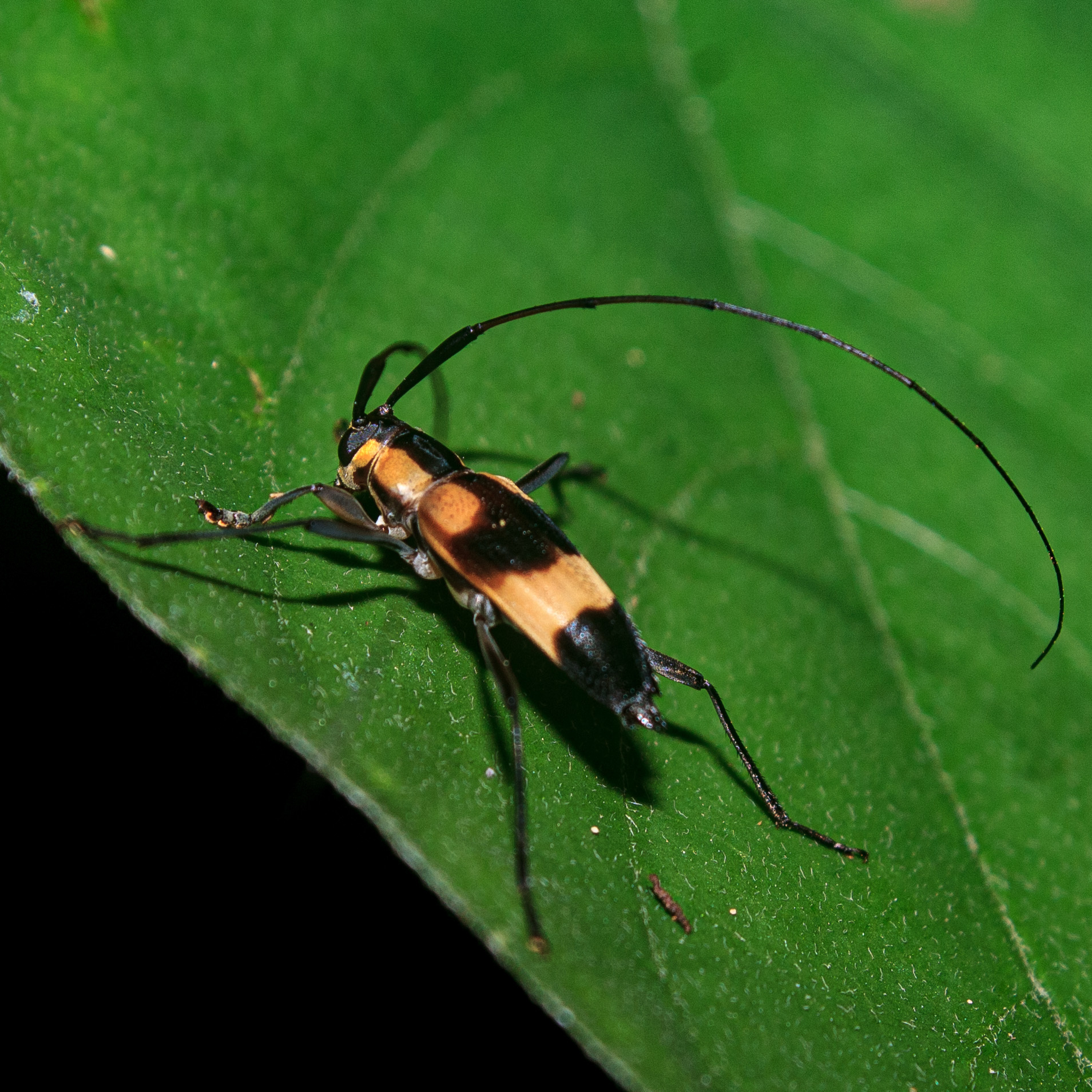

Scientific classification
- Kingdom: Animalia
- Phylum: Arthropoda
- Class: Insecta
- Order: Coleoptera
- Suborder: Polyphaga
- Infraorder: Cucujiformia
- Family: Cerambycidae
- Genus: Sangaris
- Species: S. optata

Binomial name
- Sangaris optata (Pascoe, 1866)

Synonyms
- Carterica optata Pascoe, 1866

= Sangaris optata =

Species of beetle

Sangaris optata is a species of beetle in the family Cerambycidae. It was described by Pascoe in 1866. It is known from Colombia, Guatemala, Panama, and Honduras.
