= Sangaris octomaculata =

Scientific classification
- Kingdom: Animalia
- Phylum: Arthropoda
- Class: Insecta
- Order: Coleoptera
- Suborder: Polyphaga
- Infraorder: Cucujiformia
- Family: Cerambycidae
- Genus: Sangaris
- Species: S. octomaculata

Binomial name
- Sangaris octomaculata Aurivillius, 1902

Species of beetle

Sangaris octomaculata is a species of beetle in the family Cerambycidae. It was described by Per Olof Christopher Aurivillius in 1902. It is known from Brazil.
