= Hilobothea caracensis =

Scientific classification
- Kingdom: Animalia
- Phylum: Arthropoda
- Class: Insecta
- Order: Coleoptera
- Suborder: Polyphaga
- Infraorder: Cucujiformia
- Family: Cerambycidae
- Genus: Hilobothea
- Species: H. caracensis

Binomial name
- Hilobothea caracensis Monné & Martins, 1979

Species of beetle

Hilobothea caracensis is a species of beetle in the family Cerambycidae. It was described by Monné and Martins in 1979. It is known from Brazil.
