= Carterica soror =

Scientific classification
- Kingdom: Animalia
- Phylum: Arthropoda
- Class: Insecta
- Order: Coleoptera
- Suborder: Polyphaga
- Infraorder: Cucujiformia
- Family: Cerambycidae
- Genus: Carterica
- Species: C. soror

Binomial name
- Carterica soror Belon, 1896

Synonyms
- Sparna bosqui Gilmour, 1954

Species of beetle

Carterica soror is a species of beetle in the family Cerambycidae. It was described by Belon in 1896. It is known from Bolivia.
