= Nodubothea =

Scientific classification
- Domain: Eukaryota
- Kingdom: Animalia
- Phylum: Arthropoda
- Class: Insecta
- Order: Coleoptera
- Suborder: Polyphaga
- Infraorder: Cucujiformia
- Family: Cerambycidae
- Tribe: Colobotheini
- Genus: Nodubothea

Genus of beetles

Nodubothea is a genus of longhorn beetles of the subfamily Lamiinae.

- Nodubothea nodicornis (Bates, 1881)
- Nodubothea zapoteca Monne & Monne, 2008
