= Sangaris concinna =

Scientific classification
- Kingdom: Animalia
- Phylum: Arthropoda
- Class: Insecta
- Order: Coleoptera
- Suborder: Polyphaga
- Infraorder: Cucujiformia
- Family: Cerambycidae
- Genus: Sangaris
- Species: S. concinna

Binomial name
- Sangaris concinna Dalman, 1823

Species of beetle

Sangaris concinna is a species of beetle in the family Cerambycidae. It was described by Dalman in 1823. It is known from Brazil.
