= Sparna nigrolineata =

Scientific classification
- Domain: Eukaryota
- Kingdom: Animalia
- Phylum: Arthropoda
- Class: Insecta
- Order: Coleoptera
- Suborder: Polyphaga
- Infraorder: Cucujiformia
- Family: Cerambycidae
- Genus: Sparna
- Species: S. nigrolineata

Binomial name
- Sparna nigrolineata E. Fuchs, 1956

Species of beetle

Sparna nigrolineata is a species of beetle in the family Cerambycidae. It was described by Ernst Fuchs in 1956. It is known from Colombia.
