= Nodubothea zapoteca =

Scientific classification
- Domain: Eukaryota
- Kingdom: Animalia
- Phylum: Arthropoda
- Class: Insecta
- Order: Coleoptera
- Suborder: Polyphaga
- Infraorder: Cucujiformia
- Family: Cerambycidae
- Genus: Nodubothea
- Species: N. zapoteca

Binomial name
- Nodubothea zapoteca Monne & Monne, 2008

Species of beetle

Nodubothea zapoteca is a species of beetle in the family Cerambycidae. It was described by Monne and Monne in 2008. It is known from Mexico.
