= Sangaris seabrai =

Scientific classification
- Kingdom: Animalia
- Phylum: Arthropoda
- Class: Insecta
- Order: Coleoptera
- Suborder: Polyphaga
- Infraorder: Cucujiformia
- Family: Cerambycidae
- Genus: Sangaris
- Species: S. seabrai

Binomial name
- Sangaris seabrai Zajciw, 1962

Species of beetle

Sangaris seabrai is a species of beetle in the family Cerambycidae. It was described by Dmytro Zajciw in 1962. It is known from Brazil.
