= Carterica mucronata =

Scientific classification
- Kingdom: Animalia
- Phylum: Arthropoda
- Clade: Pancrustacea
- Class: Insecta
- Order: Coleoptera
- Suborder: Polyphaga
- Infraorder: Cucujiformia
- Family: Cerambycidae
- Genus: Carterica
- Species: C. mucronata

Binomial name
- Carterica mucronata (Olivier, 1795)

Synonyms
- Carterica cinctipennis Pascoe, 1858; Carterica colobotheoides Thomson, 1860; Saperda mucronata Olivier, 1795; Saperda tenuicornis Fabricius, 1801

Species of beetle

Carterica mucronata is a species of beetle in the family Cerambycidae. It was described by Guillaume-Antoine Olivier in 1795. It is known from Bolivia, Brazil, French Guiana and Peru.
