= Cathexis vitticollis =

Scientific classification
- Kingdom: Animalia
- Phylum: Arthropoda
- Class: Insecta
- Order: Coleoptera
- Suborder: Polyphaga
- Infraorder: Cucujiformia
- Family: Cerambycidae
- Genus: Cathexis
- Species: C. vitticollis

Binomial name
- Cathexis vitticollis Zajciw, 1967

Species of beetle

Cathexis vitticollis is a species of beetle in the family Cerambycidae. It was described by Zajciw in 1967. It is known from Brazil.
