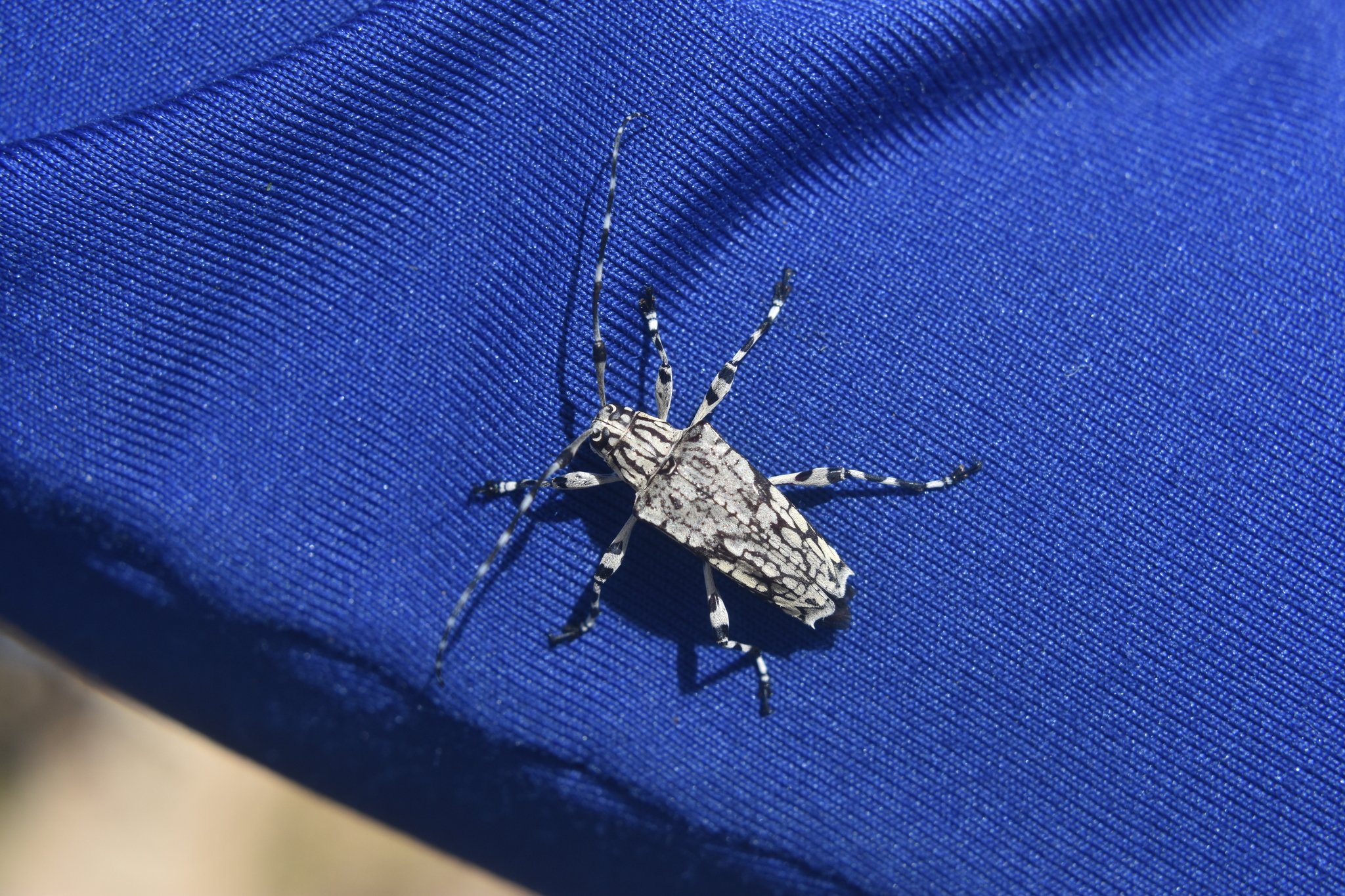
- Lophobothea reticulata, Colombia

Scientific classification
- Domain: Eukaryota
- Kingdom: Animalia
- Phylum: Arthropoda
- Class: Insecta
- Order: Coleoptera
- Suborder: Polyphaga
- Infraorder: Cucujiformia
- Family: Cerambycidae
- Subfamily: Lamiinae
- Tribe: Colobotheini
- Genus: Lophobothea; Monné, Monné & Botero, 2017

= Lophobothea =

Genus of beetles

Lophobothea is a genus of long-horned beetles in the family Cerambycidae. There are at least three described species in Lophobothea, found in Colombia and Ecuador.

== Species ==
These three species belong to the genus Lophobothea:

- Lophobothea barclayi Monné M. A., Monné M. L. & Botero, 2017 (Ecuador)
- Lophobothea nearnsi Monné M. A., Monné M. L. & Botero, 2017 (Colombia)
- Lophobothea reticulata (Bates, 1881) (Colombia)
