= Priscilla (beetle) =

Scientific classification
- Kingdom: Animalia
- Phylum: Arthropoda
- Clade: Pancrustacea
- Class: Insecta
- Order: Coleoptera
- Suborder: Polyphaga
- Infraorder: Cucujiformia
- Family: Cerambycidae
- Subfamily: Lamiinae
- Tribe: Colobotheini
- Genus: Priscilla; Thomson, 1864

Type species
- Priscilla hypsiomoides Thomson, 1864

Genus of beetles

Priscilla is a genus of beetles in the family Cerambycidae.

Species:

- Priscilla dolosa Tavakilian, 2024
- Priscilla hypsiomoides Thomson, 1864
