= Sangaris duplex =

Scientific classification
- Kingdom: Animalia
- Phylum: Arthropoda
- Class: Insecta
- Order: Coleoptera
- Suborder: Polyphaga
- Infraorder: Cucujiformia
- Family: Cerambycidae
- Genus: Sangaris
- Species: S. duplex

Binomial name
- Sangaris duplex (Bates, 1881)

Species of beetle

Sangaris duplex is a species of beetle in the family Cerambycidae. It was described by Bates in 1881. It is known from Argentina, Brazil, and Paraguay.
