= Apechthes mexicanus =

Scientific classification
- Kingdom: Animalia
- Phylum: Arthropoda
- Class: Insecta
- Order: Coleoptera
- Suborder: Polyphaga
- Infraorder: Cucujiformia
- Family: Cerambycidae
- Genus: Apechthes
- Species: A. mexicanus

Binomial name
- Apechthes mexicanus Thomson, 1861

Synonyms
- Apechtes mexicanus Thomson, 1861

Species of beetle

Apechthes mexicanus is a species of beetle in the family Cerambycidae. It was described by Thomson in 1860. It is known from Guatemala, Honduras and Mexico.
