= Sangaris luteonotata =

Scientific classification
- Kingdom: Animalia
- Phylum: Arthropoda
- Class: Insecta
- Order: Coleoptera
- Suborder: Polyphaga
- Infraorder: Cucujiformia
- Family: Cerambycidae
- Genus: Sangaris
- Species: S. luteonotata

Binomial name
- Sangaris luteonotata Monné & Monné, 2009

Species of beetle

Sangaris luteonotata is a species of beetle in the family Cerambycidae. It was described by Monné and Monné in 2009. It is known from Ecuador.
