= Sangaris ordinale =

Scientific classification
- Kingdom: Animalia
- Phylum: Arthropoda
- Class: Insecta
- Order: Coleoptera
- Suborder: Polyphaga
- Infraorder: Cucujiformia
- Family: Cerambycidae
- Genus: Sangaris
- Species: S. ordinale

Binomial name
- Sangaris ordinale Monné & Monné, 2009

Species of beetle

Sangaris ordinale is a species of beetle in the family Cerambycidae. It was described by Monné and Monné in 2009. It is known from Ecuador.
