= Priscilla hypsiomoides =

Scientific classification
- Kingdom: Animalia
- Phylum: Arthropoda
- Clade: Pancrustacea
- Class: Insecta
- Order: Coleoptera
- Suborder: Polyphaga
- Infraorder: Cucujiformia
- Family: Cerambycidae
- Genus: Priscilla
- Species: P. hypsiomoides

Binomial name
- Priscilla hypsiomoides Thomson, 1864

Species of beetle

Priscilla hypsiomoides is a species of beetle in the family Cerambycidae. It was described by Thomson in 1864.
