= Sparna lycoides =

Scientific classification
- Domain: Eukaryota
- Kingdom: Animalia
- Phylum: Arthropoda
- Class: Insecta
- Order: Coleoptera
- Suborder: Polyphaga
- Infraorder: Cucujiformia
- Family: Cerambycidae
- Genus: Sparna
- Species: S. lycoides

Binomial name
- Sparna lycoides Thomson, 1864

Species of beetle

Sparna lycoides is a species of beetle in the family Cerambycidae. It was described by Thomson in 1864. It is known from Bolivia.
