= Sparna bosqi =

Scientific classification
- Domain: Eukaryota
- Kingdom: Animalia
- Phylum: Arthropoda
- Class: Insecta
- Order: Coleoptera
- Suborder: Polyphaga
- Infraorder: Cucujiformia
- Family: Cerambycidae
- Genus: Sparna
- Species: S. bosqi

Binomial name
- Sparna bosqi Gilmour, 1954

Species of beetle

Sparna bosqi is a species of beetle in the family Cerambycidae. It was described by Gilmour in 1954. It is known from Bolivia and Peru.
