= Sangaris =

Scientific classification
- Kingdom: Animalia
- Phylum: Arthropoda
- Class: Insecta
- Order: Coleoptera
- Suborder: Polyphaga
- Infraorder: Cucujiformia
- Family: Cerambycidae
- Subfamily: Lamiinae
- Tribe: Colobotheini
- Genus: Sangaris; Dalman, 1823

Genus of beetles

Sangaris is a genus of longhorn beetles of the subfamily Lamiinae.

- Sangaris albida Monné, 1993
- Sangaris cancellata (Bates, 1881)
- Sangaris concinna Dalman, 1823
- Sangaris condei Melzer, 1931
- Sangaris duplex (Bates, 1881)
- Sangaris geometrica (Bates, 1872)
- Sangaris giesberti Hovore, 1998
- Sangaris inornata Monné, 1993
- Sangaris invida Melzer, 1932
- Sangaris laeta (Bates, 1881)
- Sangaris lezamai Hovore, 1998
- Sangaris luctuosa (Pascoe, 1859)
- Sangaris luteonotata Monné & Monné, 2009
- Sangaris multimaculata Hovore, 1998
- Sangaris obtusicarinata (Zajciw, 1962)
- Sangaris octomaculata Aurivillius, 1902
- Sangaris optata (Pascoe, 1866)
- Sangaris ordinale Monné & Monné, 2009
- Sangaris penrosei Hovore, 1998
- Sangaris polystigma (Bates, 1881)
- Sangaris seabrai Zajciw, 1962
- Sangaris sexmaculata Monné, 1993
- Sangaris spilota Martins & Galileo, 2009
- Sangaris trifasciata Melzer, 1928
- Sangaris viridipennis Melzer, 1931
- Sangaris zikani Melzer, 1931
