= Cathexis longimana =

Scientific classification
- Domain: Eukaryota
- Kingdom: Animalia
- Phylum: Arthropoda
- Class: Insecta
- Order: Coleoptera
- Suborder: Polyphaga
- Infraorder: Cucujiformia
- Family: Cerambycidae
- Genus: Cathexis
- Species: C. longimana

Binomial name
- Cathexis longimana (Pascoe, 1859)

Synonyms
- Colobothea longimana Pascoe, 1859

Species of beetle

Cathexis longimana is a species of beetle in the family Cerambycidae. It was described by Pascoe in 1859. It is known from Argentina and Brazil.
