= Hilobothea latevittata =

Scientific classification
- Kingdom: Animalia
- Phylum: Arthropoda
- Class: Insecta
- Order: Coleoptera
- Suborder: Polyphaga
- Infraorder: Cucujiformia
- Family: Cerambycidae
- Genus: Hilobothea
- Species: H. latevittata

Binomial name
- Hilobothea latevittata (Bates, 1865)

Species of beetle

Hilobothea latevittata is a species of beetle in the family Cerambycidae. It was described by Bates in 1865. It is known from Brazil, Ecuador, Guiana, French Guiana, and Suriname.
