= Sangaris invida =

Scientific classification
- Kingdom: Animalia
- Phylum: Arthropoda
- Class: Insecta
- Order: Coleoptera
- Suborder: Polyphaga
- Infraorder: Cucujiformia
- Family: Cerambycidae
- Genus: Sangaris
- Species: S. invida

Binomial name
- Sangaris invida Melzer, 1932

Species of beetle

Sangaris invida is a species of beetle in the family Cerambycidae. It was described by Melzer in 1932. It is known from Brazil.
