= Sympleurotis =

Scientific classification
- Kingdom: Animalia
- Phylum: Arthropoda
- Class: Insecta
- Order: Coleoptera
- Suborder: Polyphaga
- Infraorder: Cucujiformia
- Family: Cerambycidae
- Subfamily: Lamiinae
- Tribe: Colobotheini
- Genus: Sympleurotis; Bates, 1881

Genus of beetles

Sympleurotis is a genus of longhorn beetles of the subfamily Lamiinae.

- Sympleurotis albofasciatus Julio & Monné, 2005
- Sympleurotis armatus Gahan, 1892
- Sympleurotis rudis Bates, 1881
- Sympleurotis wappesi Julio & Monné, 2005
