= Carterica tricuspis =

Scientific classification
- Kingdom: Animalia
- Phylum: Arthropoda
- Class: Insecta
- Order: Coleoptera
- Suborder: Polyphaga
- Infraorder: Cucujiformia
- Family: Cerambycidae
- Genus: Carterica
- Species: C. tricuspis

Binomial name
- Carterica tricuspis Belon, 1903

Synonyms
- Carterica bicuspis Aurivillius, 1923

Species of beetle

Carterica tricuspis is a species of beetle in the family Cerambycidae. It was described by Belon in 1903. It is known from Bolivia.
