= Hilobothea =

Scientific classification
- Kingdom: Animalia
- Phylum: Arthropoda
- Class: Insecta
- Order: Coleoptera
- Suborder: Polyphaga
- Infraorder: Cucujiformia
- Family: Cerambycidae
- Tribe: Colobotheini
- Genus: Hilobothea

Genus of beetles

Hilobothea is a genus of longhorn beetles of the subfamily Lamiinae.

- Hilobothea caracensis Monné & Martins, 1979
- Hilobothea latevittata (Bates, 1865)
