= Sangaris multimaculata =

Scientific classification
- Kingdom: Animalia
- Phylum: Arthropoda
- Class: Insecta
- Order: Coleoptera
- Suborder: Polyphaga
- Infraorder: Cucujiformia
- Family: Cerambycidae
- Genus: Sangaris
- Species: S. multimaculata

Binomial name
- Sangaris multimaculata Hovore, 1998

Species of beetle

Sangaris multimaculata is a species of beetle in the family Cerambycidae. It was described by Hovore in 1998. It is known from Costa Rica and Honduras.
