= Cathexis (beetle) =

Scientific classification
- Kingdom: Animalia
- Phylum: Arthropoda
- Class: Insecta
- Order: Coleoptera
- Suborder: Polyphaga
- Infraorder: Cucujiformia
- Family: Cerambycidae
- Subfamily: Lamiinae
- Tribe: Colobotheini
- Genus: Cathexis; Thomson, 1860

Genus of beetles

Cathexis is a genus of Long-Horned Beetles in the beetle family Cerambycidae. There are at least two described species in Cathexis, found in Brazil and Argentina.

== Species ==
These two species belong to the genus Cathexis:

- Cathexis longimana (Pascoe, 1859) (Argentina, Brazil)
- Cathexis vitticollis Zajciw, 1967 (Brazil)
