= Colobothina =

Scientific classification
- Kingdom: Animalia
- Phylum: Arthropoda
- Class: Insecta
- Order: Coleoptera
- Suborder: Polyphaga
- Infraorder: Cucujiformia
- Family: Cerambycidae
- Genus: Colobothina
- Species: C. perplexa

Binomial name
- Colobothina perplexa Hovore, 1989

Genus of beetles

Colobothina perplexa is a species of beetle in the family Cerambycidae, and the only species in the genus Colobothina. It was described by Hovore in 1989.
