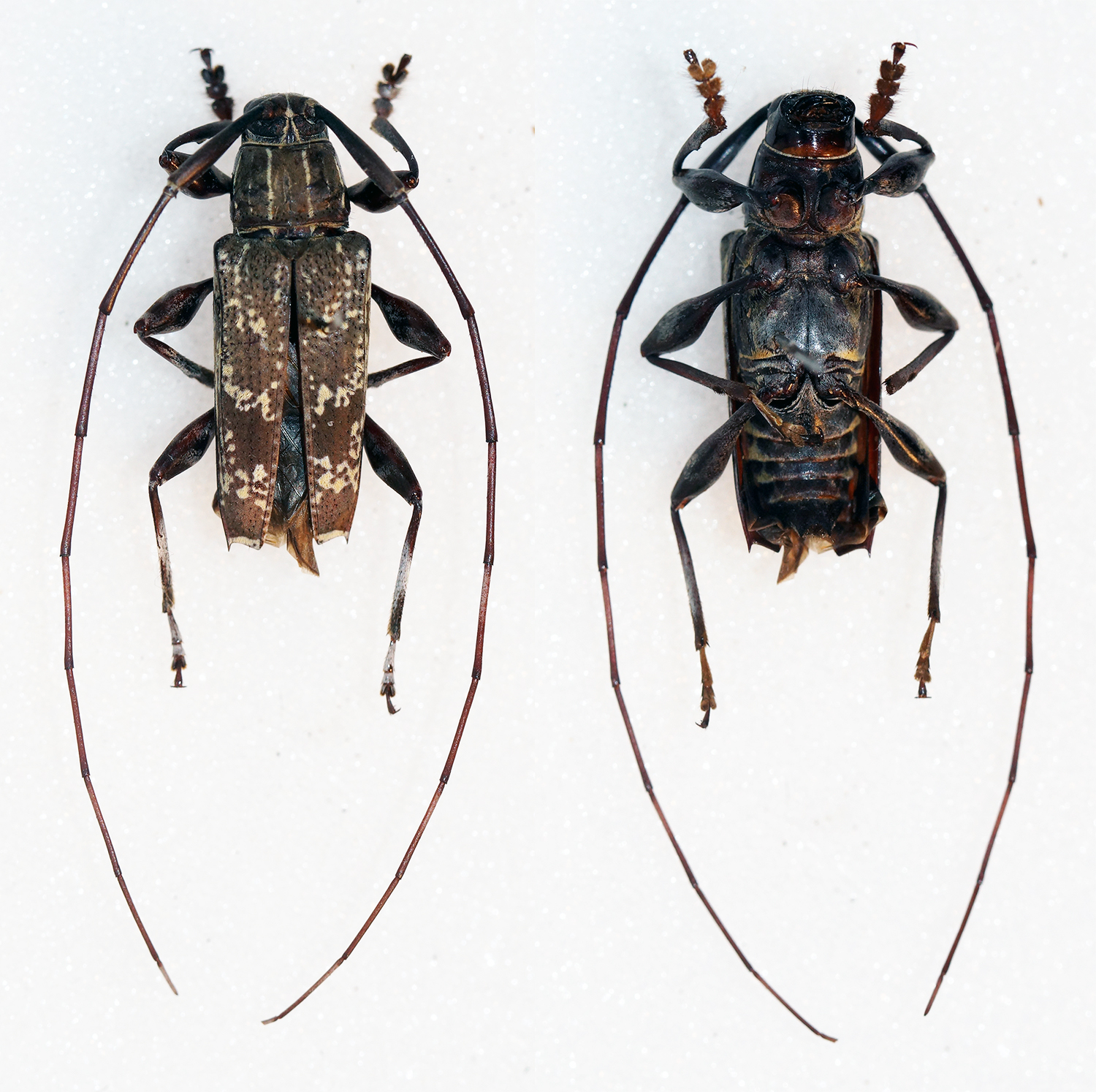
- Colobothea meleagrina (Male)

Scientific classification
- Kingdom: Animalia
- Phylum: Arthropoda
- Class: Insecta
- Order: Coleoptera
- Suborder: Polyphaga
- Infraorder: Cucujiformia
- Family: Cerambycidae
- Subfamily: Lamiinae
- Tribe: Colobotheini; Thomson, 1860

= Colobotheini =

Tribe of beetles

Colobotheini is a tribe of longhorn beetles of the subfamily Lamiinae.

== Taxonomy ==
The tribe Colobotheini contains the following genera:

These 19 genera belong to the tribe Colobotheini:

- Allocarterica Santos-Silva, Galileo & McClarin, 2018
- Apechthes Thomson, 1861
- Batesparna Santos-Silva, Galileo & McClarin, 2018
- Carneades Bates, 1869
- Carterica Pascoe, 1858
- Cathexis Thomson, 1860
- Colobothea Lepeletier & Audinet-Serville in Latreille, 1825
- Colobothina Hovore, 1990
- Confluentia Santos-Silva, Galileo & McClarin, 2018
- Francisparna Santos-Silva, Galileo & McClarin, 2018
- Hilobothea Monné & Martins, 1979
- Lophobothea Monné M. A., Monné M. L. & Botero, 2017
- Miguellus Santos-Silva, Galileo & McClarin, 2018
- Nodubothea Monné M. A. & Monné M. L., 2008
- Piriana Santos-Silva, Galileo & McClarin, 2018
- Priscilla Thomson, 1864
- Sangaris Dalman, 1823
- Sparna Thomson, 1864
- Sympleurotis Bates, 1881
