= The Woman in Cabin 10 =

The Woman in Cabin 10 may refer to:

- The Woman in Cabin 10 (novel), a 2016 novel by Ruth Ware
- The Woman in Cabin 10 (film), a 2025 film based on the novel
