= Gallery Publishing Group =

General interest publisher and a division of Simon & Schuster

- Parent company: Simon & Schuster
- Founded: 2009
- Country of origin: United States
- Headquarters location: Simon & Schuster Building; New York City
- Publication types: Books
- Imprints: Gallery Books; Pocket Books; Scout Press; Gallery 13; Saga Press
- Owner: Kohlberg Kravis Roberts
- Official website: simonandschusterpublishing.com/gallery-books/

Gallery Publishing Group is a general interest publisher and a division of Simon & Schuster which houses the imprints Gallery Books, Pocket Books, Scout Press, Gallery 13, and Saga Press.

Jen Bergstrom is the Senior Vice President and Publisher.

== History ==
Simon & Schuster created the Gallery Books imprint in 2009 to unite the editorial teams of Pocket Books and Simon Spotlight Entertainment (or SSE), and Gallery Books launched its first list in 2000. Louise Burke was named executive vice-president and publisher while Jennifer Bergstrom, who had been publisher of SSE, would be editor-in-chief. Gallery's initial mission was to focus on women's fiction, pop culture and entertainment.

Simon & Schuster announced a reorganization in October 2012 that created four divisions, with the Gallery Publishing Group as one. When the reorganization was complete, Gallery Publishing Group consisted of Gallery Books, Pocket Books, Pocket Star, and Karen Hunter Books. In the years since, Pocket Star and Karen Hunter Books have been disbanded, while new imprints have been created. Pocket Books, which was founded in 1939 and was instrumental in introducing the pocket-size book to the American market, remains active and continues to publish mass-market editions.

In 2015 the Gallery Publishing Group launched literary fiction imprint Scout Press with Ruth Ware's debut, In a Dark, Dark Wood. The imprint has continued to publish all of New York Times bestselling author Ware's books, along with fiction by authors including Candice Carty-Williams, Kristen Roupenian, Andrew MacDonald, and Iain Reid.

In July 2016, Gallery Books announced a new line of graphic books called Gallery 13. The imprint has published visual storytelling by creators including Stephen King, Stan Lee, and James O'Barr.

In August 2017, Jennifer Bergstrom became senior vice president and publisher following the retirement of Louise Burke.

In March 2019, the all-inclusive fantasy and science fiction imprint Saga Press moved from Simon & Schuster's Children's Publishing Group to Gallery. Saga publishes bestselling authors including Charlaine Harris, Stephen Graham Jones, Rebecca Roanhorse, and Ken Liu.

Gallery Books – Gallery Publishing Group's core, general-interest imprint – has expanded its mission and scope over time and now publishes books in a wide array of categories, including commercial fiction, memoir, and narrative nonfiction.

== Imprints ==
- Gallery Books, general interest imprint
- Pocket Books, mass market imprint of the Gallery group
- Scout Press, literary fiction imprint
- Gallery 13, graphic novel imprint
- Saga Press, science fiction and fantasy imprint
- MTV Entertainment Books (formerly MTV Books), pop culture imprint, revitalized in 2021

== Notable authors ==
Simon & Schuster has published thousands of books from thousands of authors. This list represents some of the more notable authors at Gallery Books (those who are culturally significant or have had several bestsellers).

- Britney Spears
- Ruth Ware
- Stephen Chbosky
- Stephen King
- Tiffany Haddish
- Mike Rowe
- Olivia Newton-John
- Christina Lauren
- Amy Schumer
- Omarosa Manigault-Newman
- Clint Hill
- America Ferrera
- Anna Todd
- Catherine Coulter
- JR Ward
- Cecile Richards
- Candice Carty-Williams
- Chelsea Handler
- Lisa Genova
- Oliver Stone
