= Poison garden =

Garden with poisonous plants

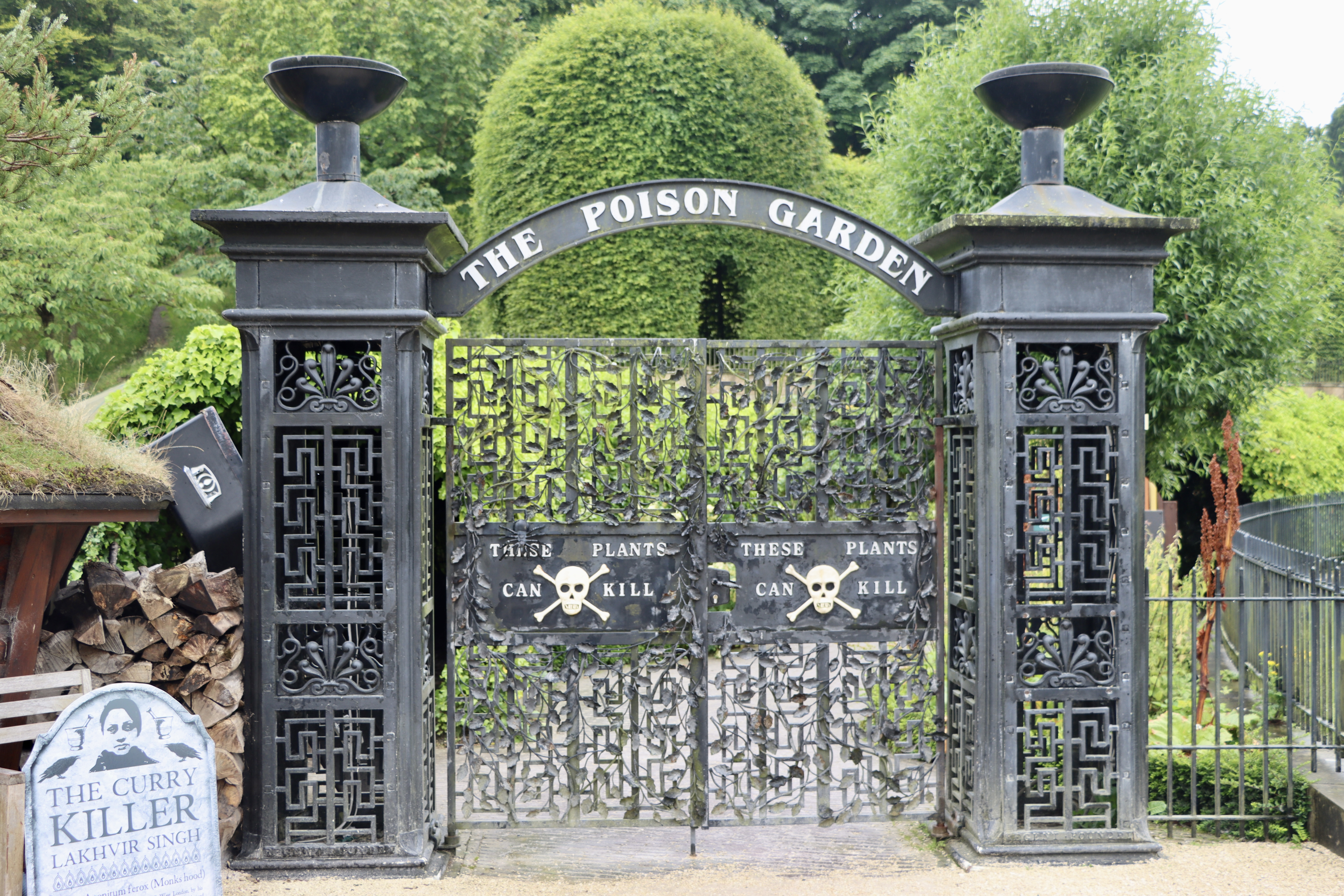
The entrance gate to the poison garden at Alnwick Garden.

A poison garden is a garden that contains poisonous, toxic, and deadly plants.

== History ==
The concept of a poison garden originates in the 16th- and 17th-century tradition of physic gardens, which grew plants for medicinal purposes. Some physic gardens, such as the Orto botanico di Padova, had sections devoted to poisonous plants.

== Examples ==
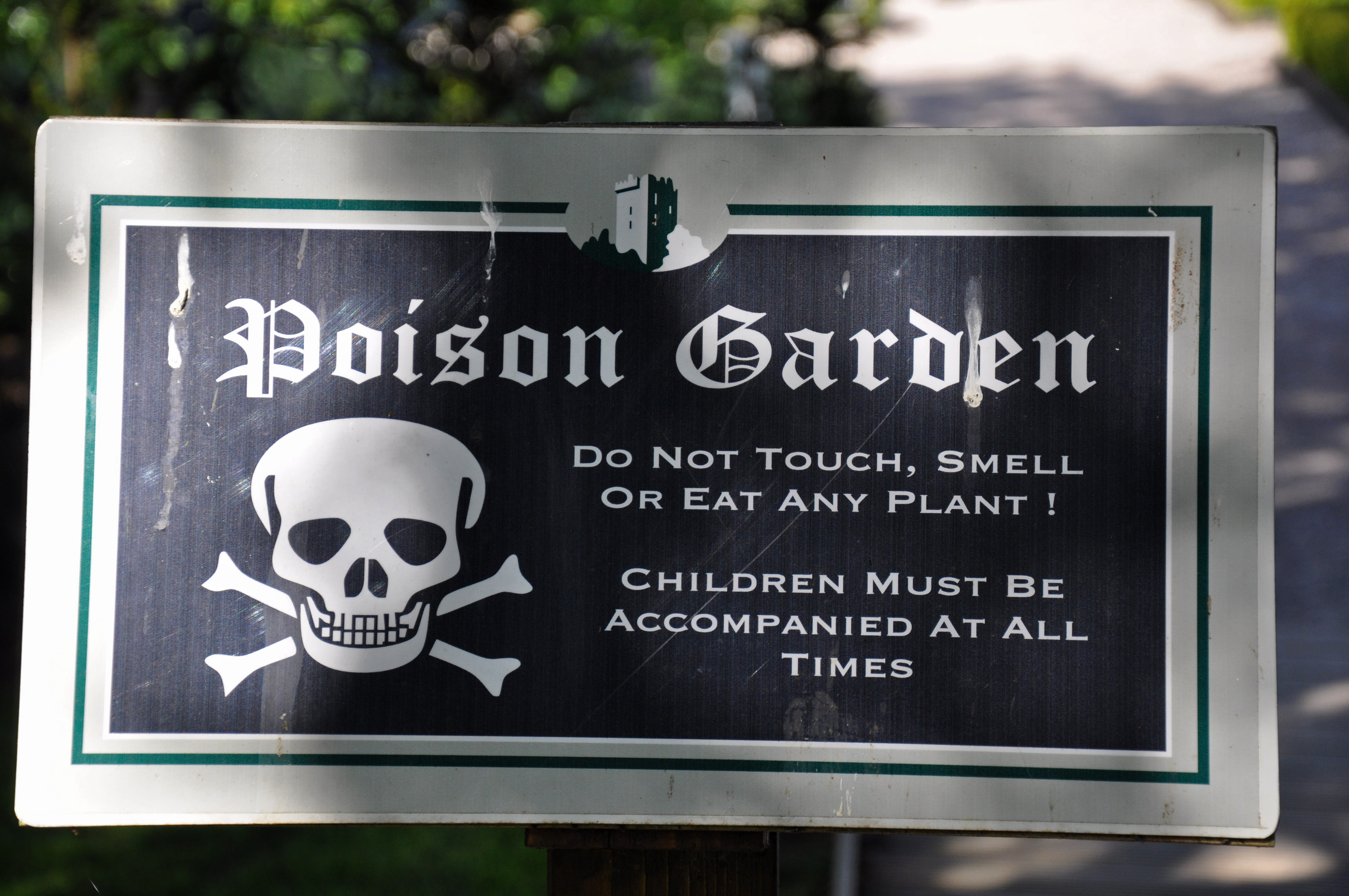
A sign at the poison garden of Blarney Castle, Ireland.

The most famous poison garden is at Alnwick Garden in Northumberland, England, which is visited by hundreds of thousands of people annually. The garden, founded in 2005 by Jane Percy, Duchess of Northumberland, contains more than 100 toxic species and serves to educate the public about the capacities of different plants. In addition to the general public, the garden has received interest from mystery writers and the police.

Torre Abbey in Devon has a poison garden that grows toxic plants mentioned in the novels of Agatha Christie. Another poison garden is located inside the gardens of Blarney Castle in Ireland. Poison gardens have also been grown by private individuals.

Cornell University was home to a poison garden, first established by the botanist Walter Conrad Muenscher in 1958, used for educating veterinary students. The University of Illinois Urbana-Champaign and University of California, Davis currently maintain poison gardens for veterinary education.

== Species ==
Poison gardens may contain plants such as:

- Brugmansia
- Cannabis
- Castor oil plant
- Cherry laurel
- Coca
- Datura
- Foxglove
- Gympie gympie
- Hellebore
- Hemlock
- Henbane
- Hogweed
- Khat
- Laburnum
- Mugwort
- Nightshade
- Oleander
- Opium poppy
- Rhododendron
- Suicide tree
- Wolfsbane
- Wormwood
- Yew

== In fiction ==
Poison gardens have featured in fictional stories such as "Rappaccini's Daughter" by Nathaniel Hawthorne and The Turn of the Key by Ruth Ware.

== See also ==
- List of poisonous plants
