= The Lying Game (disambiguation) =

The Lying Game is a 2011–2013 American teen drama television series.

The Lying Game may also refer to:

== Books ==
- The Lying Game (novel series), by Sara Shepard, or a 2010 novel in the series
- The Lying Game (Ware novel), a 2017 novel by Ruth Ware

== Television ==
- The Lying Game (Taiwanese TV series), 2014
- "The Lying Game" (That's So Raven), a season 2 episode of That's So Raven
- "The Lying Game" (The Lone Gunmen), episode 11 of The Lone Gunmen
- "The Lying Game" (CSI: NY), a season 3 episode of CSI: NY
