= Mom Genes =

2021 book by Abigail Tucker

Mom Genes: Inside the New Science of Our Ancient Maternal Instinct
- Author: Abigail Tucker
- Publisher: Gallery Books
- Publication date: April 27, 2021
- Pages: 336
- ISBN: 978-1-5011-9285-2

Mom Genes: Inside the New Science of Our Ancient Maternal Instinct is a 2021 book by Abigail Tucker that examines motherhood.
