= The Woman in Suite 11 =

2025 novel by Ruth Ware

- Book cover
- Author: Ruth Ware
- Language: English
- Genre: Psychological thriller
- Set in: Switzerland; Sussex; London
- Publisher: Scout Press
- Publication date: 2025
- Pages: 400
- ISBN: 9781668025628
- Preceded by: The Woman in Cabin 10

The Woman in Suite 11 is a 2025 psychological thriller novel by British author Ruth Ware, the sequel to Ware's 2016 novel The Woman in Cabin 10. The novel revisits the character of Lo Blacklock, ten years after her ordeal on the Aurora Borealis, as she becomes entangled in a murder investigation after unexpectedly reuniting with a figure from her past.

== Plot ==
Laura "Lo" Blacklock has given up travel journalism to focus on raising her two young sons with her husband Judah in New York City, where she has become a U.S. citizen. She receives an invitation to cover the grand opening of a luxury hotel in Switzerland owned by the Leidmann Group, a European conglomerate led by billionaire Marcus Leidmann. Lo accepts, hoping to revive her journalism career.

Upon arriving at the hotel, Lo has surprise run-ins with Ben, Alexander, and Cole, fellow passengers from the Aurora Borealis. That night, she receives a note requesting her to come to suite 11; she is shocked to find Carrie, "the woman in cabin 10" whom she has not seen since Carrie's disappearance ten years ago.

Carrie tells Lo that she is trapped as Marcus' mistress; he is aware of Carrie's true identity and her wanted status for her role in Anne Bullmer's death. He has threatened to report her to the authorities, or even have her killed, if she disobeys him. Carrie believes that Marcus invited the four Aurora Borealis passengers to the hotel as a way to control her, forcing her to hide from them in her suite.

When Carrie asks Lo for assistance escaping back to England—disguising herself as Lo and travelling together using Lo's two passports—Lo is conflicted but ultimately accepts, unable to refuse helping Carrie. During an interview with Lo the next day, Marcus says he is undecided whether his son Pieter will succeed him as CEO. Lo leaves Switzerland early, feigning a health crisis with her elderly mother. Carrie and Lo successfully pass through immigration in Paris and reach England.

To celebrate, Carrie treats Lo to a luxury hotel stay in the Sussex countryside, but Marcus and Pieter arrive the next day; Carrie believes they are tracking Lo to see if Carrie is with her. In the morning, Lo runs across Pieter in the hallway, speaking to Marcus inside his hotel room and then heading down to breakfast. Shortly afterward, a cleaner discovers Marcus drowned in his bathtub.

Lo believes Carrie is innocent because she was already in their hotel room when Lo returned from seeing Pieter. Lo is interviewed by Interpol officer Filippo Capaldi as well as by British police, who later arrest her for Marcus' murder. Marcus' phone contained images of Lo and Cole in what looks like a romantic encounter outside her hotel room in Switzerland; Lo insists that it was only an innocuous kiss on the cheek, but the police believe the images are motive for her to kill Marcus.

After being released on bail, Lo reunites with Ben and Cole; they analyse the key card data from the hotel, which Lo believes points toward her innocence. She also listens to the audio of Marcus' phone call ordering room service after speaking with Pieter. Returning to her hotel room, Lo finds that Carrie has disappeared and taken Lo's suitcase with her. Judah surprises Lo at the hotel, having traveled to England from New York. The pair track Carrie to her grandmother's house in Woodingdean via an AirTag device in Lo's suitcase.

Lo confronts Carrie, suggesting that she and Pieter planned Marcus' murder and that the room service phone call was faked with a recording of Marcus' voice; Carrie actually drowned Marcus earlier that morning, before Lo's encounter with Pieter. Carrie confesses, explaining that she had intended to give Lo an alibi, but the plan had not gone as expected. She agrees to turn herself into Interpol, and Capaldi takes her away. However, Lo and Judah later realise that Capaldi is not a real Interpol officer; Lo recalls seeing him as one of Marcus' employees in Switzerland.

While visiting her mother's house in London, Lo is attacked by Pieter in search of Carrie's phone, which Carrie secretly left with Lo. After dialling 999, an injured Lo convinces Pieter that he could not live a life on the run like Carrie, and she watches helplessly as he shoots himself. Lo is exonerated after giving Carrie's phone to the police. She returns to New York with Judah and later receives a photo message of Carrie and Capaldi embracing on a beach.

== Background ==
The Woman in Suite 11 is Ware's first sequel after nine standalone psychological thrillers. Ware said she was "excited" to explore a "fresh perspective" on Lo, the character about which she received the most questions from readers. She described Lo as "a really empathetic person, which is her downfall in both books because she has a slight saviour complex."

According to Ware, she was halfway through writing the sequel before she heard that the film adaptation of The Woman in Cabin 10 had been greenlit, making the timing "spookily" fortunate. Ware said that while writing The Woman in Suite 11 she wanted to consider three different groups of readers: those who had read The Woman in Cabin 10, those who had not, and those who had only seen the film.

== Reception ==
The Woman in Suite 11 appeared on multiple weekly bestseller lists, including The New York Times, USA Today, The Globe and Mail, and the Toronto Star.

Tom Nolan of The Wall Street Journal said The Woman in Suite 11 was "the type of trickily constructed tale that rewards one's suspension of common sense with a bullet-train ride of a narrative," adding that "Ms. Ware's reputation as an ingenious crafter of modern suspense remains intact." Rob Merrill, in an Associated Press review, wrote that "Lo's voice is the best part of the book", also praising the story's cliffhangers and the escalating tension.

The Irish Times contributor Declan Burke called The Woman in Suite 11 "a fast-paced treasure trove of conspicuous consumption, double and triple crosses, and imperilled heroines making very bad decisions". Deirdre McArdle, in the Irish Examiner, said the novel was "the ideal holiday read" and "the definition of a page-turner", although it had "arguably a couple of twists too many". Anne Marie Scanlon, for the Irish Independent, criticised the book's depiction of journalism and called the character of Lo "exasperating" for her "lack of curiosity".

Library Journal called The Woman in Suite 11 "a complex story full of twists and unexpected turns", but criticised its reliance on "guilt by association and unsupported theory, rather than evidence". Kirkus Reviews said the novel was "an enjoyable visit with an old character, but not one of Ware's strongest" due to a mystery that was "not as atmospheric and gripping as usual". Publishers Weekly wrote that "Ware doesn't tie everything up perfectly, but she keeps the pace fast and the twists coming" and that the book would "satisfy the author's fans."
