= The Turn of the Key =

2019 novel by Ruth Ware

- Book cover
- Author: Ruth Ware
- Language: English
- Genre: Psychological thriller Gothic fiction
- Set in: Scottish Highlands; London
- Publisher: Scout Press
- Publication date: 2019
- Pages: 352
- ISBN: 9781787300439

The Turn of the Key is a 2019 Gothic psychological thriller novel by British author Ruth Ware. It follows a nanny accused of murder after she accepts a live-in position at a reportedly haunted smart home in the remote Scottish Highlands. Drawing inspiration from The Turn of the Screw by Henry James, the novel explores themes of technology and paranoia.

== Plot ==
The novel is structured as a series of letters from London nanny Rowan Caine—currently in prison awaiting trial for murder—written to the barrister she hopes will defend her.

One day, Rowan reads an advertisement for a live-in nanny at Heatherbrae, a remote house near Inverness in the Scottish Highlands. The house is occupied by architects Sandra and Bill Elincourt and their four children: 14-year-old Rhiannon, eight-year-old Maddie, five-year-old Ellie, and 18-month-old Petra. Heatherbrae, a traditional Victorian house with a modern extension, is equipped with security cameras and cutting-edge smart home technology.

After an in-person job interview, Rowan accepts the position. Sandra warns Rowan that several nannies have already left because of rumours that the house is haunted; Rowan finds an ominous unfinished note from one of them in her bedroom. Bill makes a sexual advance toward Rowan on her first night, which she awkwardly deflects. With Rhiannon at boarding school, Sandra and Bill soon depart on a business trip, leaving Rowan with the three youngest girls. Paranoid about being watched, Rowan covers the camera in her room.

Rowan soon experiences several mysterious and disturbing events—including footsteps pacing above her at night, an unexplained scream from Petra's baby monitor, and the house's back door seemingly locking itself. Meanwhile, Maddie acts surly and hostile while manipulating Ellie into obeying her and attempting to get Rowan in trouble. The girls lead Rowan into a locked garden on Heatherbrae's grounds; an upset Sandra later informs Rowan that the enclosure is a poison garden planted by Heatherbrae's previous owner, a toxicologist. The man's daughter died after accidentally eating berries from the garden; multiple tragedies also occurred at the house before his ownership.

In the middle of the night, the house's lights suddenly turn on and loud music plays through the speakers. Rowan restores order with the help of Jack Grant, the Elincourts' handyman. Jack and Rowan break open a locked door in her bedroom that leads up to a small attic, where the walls have scribbled writings about ghosts. Unnerved, Rowan sleeps downstairs that night, but a doll's head from the attic is resting on top of her when she awakens.

When Rhiannon—home from boarding school—returns from a "sleepover" smelling of alcohol, Rowan threatens to tell her parents. However, Rhiannon blackmails Rowan by revealing she knows Rowan's real name: Rachel Gerhardt. She also reveals that Bill has had affairs with all the previous nannies at Heatherbrae, and that he nearly ran away with one of them. Rachel (a.k.a. "Rowan") discloses to the reader that Bill is actually her biological father, making the four girls her half-sisters. Bill left Rachel's mother before she was born; she found the nanny job when searching his name online, deciding it was the ideal opportunity to meet him. To prevent Bill from recognising her surname and potentially refusing to see her, Rachel has stolen the identity of Rowan—her flatmate and nursery colleague—while Rowan is travelling abroad.

Overwhelmed by her talk with Rhiannon, Rachel seeks comfort from Jack, and the two sleep together, although she later learns he is married. She returns to her bedroom to find the window wide open and Maddie's dead body on the ground beneath it. Given the body's position, the police suspect Maddie jumped or was pushed; they arrest Rachel for her murder. Sandra later takes the children and leaves Bill for his infidelities, while Heatherbrae lies abandoned.

In an epilogue after Rachel's trial, a construction worker discovers the pile of Rachel's unsent letters, hidden inside her prison cell; the trial's outcome is unclear. The pile also contains a message from Ellie to Rachel in which Ellie reveals that Maddie was responsible for the "supernatural" events at Heatherbrae. Maddie entered the attic via a small window above Rachel's bedroom and played footstep noises on a mobile phone; she also tampered with the smart home system to make the house appear haunted. According to Ellie, Maddie tried to scare Rachel away "like all the others" because she was afraid Rachel would "take Daddy away". Ellie admits that when Maddie attempted to climb back into the attic, she pushed Maddie out of Rachel's window in order to stop her.

== Background ==
The Turn of the Key is Ware's fifth psychological thriller, and her first set in Scotland—specifically, the Spey Valley, where her mother's family is from. Ware spent many holidays in Scotland as a child, calling it "a place where the barrier between realities is very thin, and where things that go bump in the night might quite easily be more than just a book falling off the nightstand."

According to Ware, the book's working title was Hushabye Baby; she had not read The Turn of the Screw before starting the manuscript, but soon realised she was "treading on some of the same ground." Ware called Heatherbrae's smart home technology "nightmarish", contrasting it with the "shifting, nebulous paranoia" of James' novella. In an interview, Ware said that the two books "deal with some of the same preoccupations", including the sensation of being watched. She cited as inspiration multiple recent cases in which smart home and digital technologies were used for surveillance and abuse.

== Reception ==
The Turn of the Key appeared on multiple weekly bestseller lists, including The New York Times and Publishers Weekly.

The Guardian's Alison Flood called The Turn of the Key a "spooky, tense thriller" and a "cracking tale", comparing the menacing house to the one in Ware's first thriller In a Dark, Dark Wood. NPR's Annalisa Quinn said the novel was "a clever and elegant update" to The Turn of The Screw "with less ambiguity but its own eerie potency", adding that "Ware creates suspense with sinister precision." Karen Brissette, for the Los Angeles Review of Books, wrote that Ware deploys "a satisfyingly dizzying parade of twists and reveals" and "admirably" handles the book's tension between traditionalism and modernity.

Tina Jordan, in The New York Times, said that Rowan's characterisation lacked originality but enjoyed the novel's "creepy Gothic sensibility." BuzzFeed News' Dana Vogel called The Turn of the Key "deliciously creepy", adding that it "contains twist after twist right until the last few pages and might have you sleeping with the lights on." Darragh McManus, for the Irish Independent, said that the novel's plot was "slow-moving" and some of Rowan's decisions were "implausible", but that "it's easy enough to let yourself fall into the sustained mood of gloom, mystery and dread." Barry Forshaw, in the i, contrasted Ware's book with The Turn of the Screw, writing: "If the ambiguity of the ending lacks the resonance of James's novella, the questions it leaves hanging are thoughtful and provocative."

In a starred review for Library Journal, Stephanie K. Klose wrote that "Ware hits another one out of the park", recommending The Turn of the Key to "fans of hers or anyone with a taste for the disturbing". Another starred review by Edwin Hill for Publishers Weekly said that "Ware skillfully lays the bread crumbs to the novel’s satisfying conclusion... The final section not only pulls together the plot’s many threads but also leaves readers with one final, haunting question". Kirkus Reviews called the book "truly terrifying", criticising the ending's lack of ambiguity but praising Ware's "ability to craft atmosphere and sustain tension".

== Adaptation ==
In 2021, Working Title Films optioned the film rights to The Turn of the Key, with Max Minghella and Jamie Bell as writers.
