= The Woman in Cabin 10 (novel) =

2016 novel by Ruth Ware

- Book cover
- Author: Ruth Ware
- Language: English
- Genre: Psychological thriller
- Set in: London; Norway
- Publisher: Scout Press
- Publication date: 2016
- Pages: 352
- ISBN: 9781501132933
- Followed by: The Woman in Suite 11

The Woman in Cabin 10 is a 2016 psychological thriller novel by British author Ruth Ware. It follows Lo Blacklock, a travel journalist who witnesses what appears to be a murder aboard a luxury cruise ship, only to find that all passengers are accounted for and her claims are met with disbelief.

The novel appeared on multiple weekly bestseller lists and ranked among Publishers Weekly's top 10 print bestsellers of 2017. Ware released a sequel, The Woman in Suite 11, in 2025. The novel was also adapted into the 2025 Netflix film The Woman in Cabin 10, starring Keira Knightley.

== Plot ==
Laura "Lo" Blacklock, a 32-year-old travel journalist in London, suffers from alcoholism and insomnia. She is traumatised by a recent burglary in her flat which left her trapped in her bedroom for hours, and her relationship with her boyfriend Judah is on the rocks.

Lo is offered the chance to cover the maiden voyage of the Aurora Borealis, a luxury cruise liner owned by businessman Lord Richard Bullmer. Upon embarking, Lo is assigned to cabin 9; she borrows mascara from her neighbour in cabin 10, a young woman. At dinner that evening, Lo meets Bullmer and his wife Anne, a Norwegian heiress who is ill with cancer. Other passengers include Lo's ex-partner and fellow journalist Ben; food critic Alexander; and photographer Cole, a friend of Bullmer. Notably, the woman in cabin 10 is not present.

At 3 a.m., Lo hears the veranda door of cabin 10 slide open, followed by a splash. Rushing to her balcony, she glimpses what looks like a body disappearing below the waves, as well as a smear of blood on the glass divider between cabins. After head of security Nilsson arrives, Lo discovers that the smear is gone and cabin 10 is untouched. Nilsson tells her that the cabin is empty due to a guest backing out of the trip, suggesting that she is drunk and hallucinating.

The next morning, Lo speaks with the ship's crew, but none of them resemble the missing woman. She returns to her cabin and finds that the mascara tube has disappeared. Frustrated with Nilsson's inaction, Lo asks Ben for help investigating, but later starts to suspect him as her paranoia increases. While Lo is at the ship's spa, someone writes the words STOP DIGGING on her bathroom mirror. She finds the missing woman in one of Cole's photos, but the camera's SD card is later destroyed by water damage. Lo informs Bullmer of what she has witnessed, and he promises to take action. Later, her phone disappears from her cabin while she is in the shower.

In the middle of the night, Lo hears tapping on her door and is shocked to see the missing woman through the peephole. She chases her into the staff quarters, but is knocked unconscious and imprisoned below deck. Attempting to escape, Lo attacks the woman when she comes to bring food, but relents in exchange for her antidepressant medication. While cleaning her face, the woman accidentally washes off her made-up eyebrows, and Lo recognises her as Bullmer's wife Anne. She then realises that the woman is actually impersonating Anne; Bullmer smuggled her aboard and into cabin 10, where she was waiting for him when Lo met her on the first day.

The woman, whose name is Carrie, is having an affair with Bullmer; she met him as a waitress at a gentleman's club where Cole did a photoshoot. Lo realises that Bullmer killed Anne the first night of the cruise after dinner, though he told Carrie that it was an accident and convinced her to throw Anne's body overboard. Lo suggests to Carrie that Bullmer is exploiting her, making her impersonate Anne long enough to receive Anne's inheritance. Lo and Carrie bond over their shared love of the book Winnie-the-Pooh, and Lo convinces Carrie to let her escape while the ship is docked at a Norwegian village. Carrie warns Lo that Bullmer has many contacts in the area.

While attempting to evade Bullmer on the ship, Lo falls overboard into the icy water. She seeks help from a nearby hotel and a policeman, but runs away from both, believing they are in contact with Bullmer. Taking refuge in a barn, Lo is found by a local farmer. She flies back to London and reunites with her boyfriend, suggesting that they move to New York to accept Judah's new job offer. Scotland Yard informs Lo that two bodies have been recovered from the water: Bullmer's body, with a bullet wound, as well as the body of a woman. Lo believes Carrie has drowned, but officials conclude the body belongs to Anne and Bullmer's bullet wound was not self-inflicted. She later receives a mysterious bank transfer with a message referencing Winnie-the-Pooh.

== Background ==
The Woman in Cabin 10 is Ware's second novel, after her 2015 debut In a Dark, Dark Wood. Ware felt pressure to live up to the success of her first novel, calling the writing process "like drawing blood out of stone". The book was written during 2014 and 2015, when—according to Ware—there were multiple news stories about women "whose word was not taken at face value".

Ware had never been on a cruise before writing The Woman in Cabin 10, although the book was influenced by ferry voyages during her childhood holidays. She also said that the book's story was inspired by Murder on the Orient Express by Agatha Christie, which similarly features "panicked travelers trapped in a luxurious temporary prison".

Another inspiration for Ware was the legal grey area surrounding crimes on ships in international waters. Reflecting on her work in 2019, Ware called the plot of The Woman in Cabin 10 "one of the most coldblooded crimes I've ever devised — a murder committed in international waters using a method designed to leave detectives wondering not just whodunit but did it happen at all?"

== Reception ==
The Woman in Cabin 10 appeared on multiple weekly bestseller lists, including The New York Times, The Washington Post, The Wall Street Journal, Publishers Weekly, USA Today, and The Sunday Times. The book was featured in Publishers Weekly's list of top 10 print bestsellers of 2017, selling more than 597,000 units that year.

Barry Forshaw, in The Independent, wrote that The Woman in Cabin 10 "bucks the trend of disappointing follow-ups", adding that it was "every bit as taut and provocative" as Ware's first book. Joan Smith of The Times called the book "a fantastic variation on the woman-in-peril theme, with a plucky protagonist and a brilliantly claustrophobic setting." The Guardian's Mark Lawson placed the novel among "the best crime books and thrillers of 2016", writing that it "channels Agatha Christie's murders at sea in a satisfying contemporary direction".

For The Washington Post, Carol Memmott called The Woman in Cabin 10 "an atmospheric thriller" that was "twisty and tension-filled". Ginny Green of The Minnesota Star Tribune praised the book's "churning plot worthy of Agatha Christie", adding that the book "just may do to cruise vacations what Jaws did to ocean swimming. You'll be afraid to go out on the water." Christina Ledbetter of the Associated Press said The Woman in Cabin 10 was a "snappy thriller", admiring its "delightfully eerie" setting. Mary Todd Chesnut, in Library Journal, called the book "a gripping maritime psychological thriller that will keep readers spellbound" with its "intense final chapters".

Kirkus Reviews wrote that The Woman in Cabin 10 was a "tense, claustrophobic mystery" with a "successful formula", but that the ending was "unsatisfying" with "too much drama". Publishers Weekly called the book "underwhelming", adding: "Those expecting a Christie-style locked-room mystery at sea will be disappointed." Darragh McManus, in the Irish Independent, said the novel had a "superlative set-up" but "trails off pretty badly from about halfway", criticising its pacing and the "self-absorbed and annoying" character of Lo.

== Adaptation ==
CBS Films purchased the film rights to The Woman in Cabin 10 in 2017, outbidding DreamWorks and Sony. In May 2024, Netflix announced that it would develop a movie adaptation, with Keira Knightley to star as Lo. The film was released on October 10, 2025.

The film adaptation features multiple differences from the original novel, including:

- In the film, Lo is an investigative journalist for The Guardian, instead of a travel writer.
- Many of the minor characters on board the Aurora Borealis differ between the book and film.
- Lo's mental health struggles with depression and alcoholism are less of a focus in the film, and she is more confident in what she witnessed.
- Carrie is not having an affair with Bullmer in the film; he finds her using facial recognition software and hires her to impersonate Anne.
- The character of Judah does not appear in the film; Lo is single and rekindles her relationship with Ben. Ben is killed in the film when attempting to come to Lo's rescue.
- In the film, Lo disrupts a gala hosted by Bullmer and Carrie and reveals Carrie's true identity, rather than attempting to flee as in the book. Bullmer is shot onscreen in the film by his head of security, with Lo delivering the final blow by hitting him over the head.

Ware, commenting on these changes between book and film, said that it was "right to go a different direction" given the realities of adapting a novel for screen. She especially praised the film's ending, calling it "brilliant" and "restorative justice".

== Sequel ==
The Woman in Suite 11, a sequel to The Woman in Cabin 10, was published in July 2025. In the sequel, Lo—now happily married to Judah and living a quiet family life—is offered the chance to restart her travel writing career with a visit to a luxury hotel in Switzerland. Once there, she is contacted by a woman who claims that she is the mistress of the hotel's owner, and that her life is in danger.
