= The Death of Mrs Westaway =

2018 novel by Ruth Ware

- Book cover
- Author: Ruth Ware
- Language: English
- Genre: Psychological thriller Gothic fiction
- Set in: Cornwall; Brighton
- Publisher: Scout Press
- Publication date: 2018
- Pages: 384
- ISBN: 9781501156212

The Death of Mrs Westaway is a 2018 Gothic psychological thriller novel by British author Ruth Ware. The novel follows Hal Westaway, a young and debt-ridden tarot reader who poses as a recently deceased woman's granddaughter to claim her inheritance, only to uncover the family's dark secrets.

== Plot ==
Harriet "Hal" Westaway has worked as a tarot reader on Brighton's West Pier since her mother Margarida was killed in a hit-and-run car accident three years ago. She never knew her father; her mother told her she was the product of a one-night stand. With a violent loan shark threatening her, Hal is desperate to repay her debts. One day, Hal receives a letter informing her that her grandmother Hester Westaway has died, and that she is a beneficiary in the will. She believes it has been sent in error, since her grandparents are already dead, but nevertheless decides to use her cold reading skills to falsely claim her portion of the inheritance.

Spending her last funds on a train ticket, Hal arrives at Trepassen House, a large but dilapidated country estate outside Penzance, and meets her three "uncles" Harding, Abel, and Ezra. Maud, Ezra's twin sister, disappeared decades ago; the others believe that she is Maud's daughter. At the reading of the will, Mrs Westaway's executor Mr Treswick announces that she has left the entire residuary estate, including Trepassen House, to her "granddaughter", while her three sons receive only small sums of money. The news of Hal's inheritance causes shock and tension among the brothers, while Hal worries her deceit will be revealed.

Abel gives Hal a childhood photograph of himself, Ezra, Maud, and another girl: Maggie, a distant cousin who lived at Trepassen as a teenager after her parents died. Hal now believes that Maggie is her mother and that Mr Treswick has confused Maggie and Maud, since both women's legal name was Margarida.

In the tiny attic room where she sleeps, Hal finds bolts that lock the door from the outside, as well as the words HELP ME scratched into the windowpane. She also suspects that the elderly housekeeper Mrs Warren—who is hostile to Hal's presence—is aware of her deception. Guilt-stricken and uneasy, Hal sneaks out of Trepassen in the middle of the night and returns to Brighton, where she finds and reads Maggie's diary. She learns that Maggie became pregnant with her at Trepassen, and that Mrs Westaway locked Maggie up in the attic when she found out. Although the diary does not identify Hal's father, she believes he is someone whom Maggie referred to as "Ed".

Determined to uncover the truth, Hal goes back to Trepassen. She learns that Maud and Maggie—who grew close during their time at the estate—ran away together; Maggie disappeared after returning to Trepassen following Hal's birth. Hal confesses to the three brothers that her mother was not Maud, but Maggie. That night, she trips over a piece of string placed across the top of the attic stairs, narrowly avoiding a fatal injury.

After the brothers inform Mr Treswick of the mix-up, Harding and Abel depart Trepassen. Hal's train to Brighton is cancelled due to an impending snowstorm, and the weather forces Ezra and Hal to stay at Trepassen that night. Leafing through a family photo album, Hal discovers that Maud is actually the woman she knew as her mother. She realises that while Maud raised her, Maggie was her biological mother; Maud decided to assume Maggie's identity after Maggie's disappearance. She further realises that her father is Ezra—"Ed"—who is next to Maggie in the photograph.

Hal confronts Ezra, who admits that he killed both Maggie and Maud. When Maggie returned to Trepassen, Ezra strangled her and hid her body under the boathouse after she asked him for child support. Ezra also killed Maud in the hit-and-run when he learned that she planned to tell Hal about her father's identity. Hal flees from Ezra and stumbles across the dead body of the missing Mrs Warren, who was murdered by Ezra to stop her from warning Hal about him. Ezra pursues Hal to the boathouse, but he dies after falling through the thin ice on the lake.

Recovering in hospital, Hal learns that her inheritance remains valid, since as Ezra's daughter, she truly is Mrs Westaway's granddaughter. She suspects that Mrs Westaway—who knew the truth about Ezra all along—designed her will to set the events of the present in motion after her death.

== Background ==
Ware, who grew up near Brighton, decided to resurrect the town's West Pier for the novel's opening, since the structure has been largely destroyed. She cited the remoteness and natural beauty of Cornwall as motivation for the book's setting, as well as her childhood holidays in the area. According to Ware, she was unfamiliar with tarot before writing the novel, but emerged with "a huge amount of respect for tarot readers" after researching the practice.

== Reception ==
The Death of Mrs Westaway appeared on multiple weekly bestseller lists, including The New York Times, Publishers Weekly, and The Globe and Mail.

Maureen Corrigan of The Washington Post said The Death of Mrs Westaway was a "perfectly executed suspense tale very much in the mode of Daphne du Maurier's Rebecca" with a "stunning endgame". Lucy Scholes, for The Independent, rated the book four out of five stars, also comparing it to Rebecca and calling it "dark enough to send a shiver down one's spine even on the hottest summer’s day." The Wall Street Journal's Tom Nolan said the novel was a "captivating and eerie page-turner". Charles Finch, in The New York Times, called The Death of Mrs Westaway "bizarre" and "almost unbelievably dull and repetitive", comparing it unfavourably to du Maurier, Agatha Christie, and Wilkie Collins. Ginny Greene, for The Minnesota Star Tribune, wrote that the novel was "a fine fourth card in Ware’s growing deck of thrillers."

Kirkus Reviews gave The Death of Mrs Westaway a starred review, writing that it was "expertly paced, expertly crafted" and praising its "slow unspooling of unease and mystery" and "consistent sense of threat that's pervasive and gripping." Publishers Weekly described the book as a "tense, twisty modern gothic" with "evocative prose, artfully shaded characters, and a creepy, claustrophobic atmosphere". In another starred review for Library Journal, Stephanie Klose said the novel was Ware's "best yet, with steadily increasing tension, a complicated twisty mystery, and a sharp, sympathetic heroine".
