= The Lying Game (Ware novel) =

2017 novel by Ruth Ware

- Book cover
- Author: Ruth Ware
- Language: English
- Genre: Psychological thriller
- Set in: England
- Publisher: Scout Press
- Publication date: 2017
- Pages: 384
- ISBN: 9781501156007

The Lying Game is a 2017 psychological thriller novel by British author Ruth Ware. Set on the southern English coast, it follows four women who are drawn back together when a secret from their school days threatens to unravel.

== Plot ==
As a teenager, Isa Wilde befriends Kate, Thea, and Fatima at Salten House, a boarding school on the southern English coast. The four girls quickly become an inseparable clique infamous for their "Lying Game", a competition in which they earn points by telling falsehoods. They spend many weekends together at the Tide Mill—the crumbling seaside home of Kate's father Ambrose, the school's art teacher and a former heroin addict. Luc, the son of Ambrose's French ex-partner, also lives with Ambrose and Kate to escape his troubled home life in France.

One evening, Isa, Thea, and Fatima receive a mysterious text from Kate: "I need you." They arrive at the Tide Mill and discover Ambrose, dead of a heroin overdose and holding a suicide note addressed to Kate. The girls help Kate conceal Ambrose's body on the seashore so Kate can avoid entering foster care, as she is only 15. The next day, the school's headmistress confronts the girls with artistic nude drawings that Ambrose had made of them. Kate claims they are hers, but the girls are nevertheless expelled. They part ways, and Kate waits to report Ambrose's disappearance until she turns 16. Luc, still 15, is taken back to France and suffers further abuse.

Seventeen years later, Isa, Thea, and Fatima suddenly receive the same cryptic message from Kate. Isa leaves behind her partner Owen in London, travelling to Salten with her infant daughter Freya. Kate, who still lives at the Tide Mill, reveals to the trio that human remains have been found on the shore. A dead sheep appears at Kate's doorstep the next morning, and Isa discovers a threatening note suggesting that the writer knows Kate's secret. On a visit to town, Isa runs into community matriarch Mary Wren—who is suspicious of the women's sudden reappearance—as well as Luc, who has returned to Salten and is unexpectedly angry with her.

After attending an alumnae dinner at Salten, the four women encounter Luc back at the Tide Mill; he voices his suspicion that the girls buried Ambrose. Isa returns to London and later learns that Ambrose's body has been identified. Luc sends Isa flowers as an apology, arousing Owen's jealousy. An unknown person posts copies of Ambrose's intimate drawings to the four women; Isa later learns that someone has been using the drawings to blackmail Kate for years. Isa, Fatima, and Thea realise that the school learned about the drawings only after Ambrose's death, which contradicts their assumption about why he committed suicide. They now suspect Ambrose was either being blackmailed or was killed.

Owen finds Ambrose's drawings of Isa and assumes she is having an affair. Isa comes back to Salten with Freya after learning that Ambrose's death is now under investigation. Isa runs into Luc in town; they return to the Tide Mill and start to have sex, but are interrupted when Kate discovers them. Mary informs Isa that Ambrose's overdose was ingested orally, according to his postmortem, and that Kate and Luc were romantically involved as teenagers. Isa meets with Fatima and Thea to examine Ambrose's suicide note; they decide that he wrote it to protect Kate after she poisoned his wine. The trio confront Kate, who confesses that she murdered Ambrose for trying to separate her and Luc after he discovered their relationship.

Luc arrives at the Tide Mill that night and argues with Kate. While eavesdropping, Isa realises that Kate lied to cover for Luc, who poisoned Ambrose and sent the drawings to the school after learning Ambrose wanted to send him back to France. Ambrose wrote the "suicide note" as his last act, indirectly asking Kate to protect Luc to prevent further suffering. After a paraffin lamp breaks during the fight, the house is set ablaze. Luc saves Freya from the burning building, and Kate goes back in after him; both are killed as the structure collapses. Isa later speculates that Kate let the underage Luc be taken away to punish him for killing Ambrose; she also concludes that Mary was likely responsible for threatening and blackmailing Kate. The remaining trio travel to Scotland to visit Isa's father, and Isa resolves to stay with Owen for Freya's sake.

== Background ==
The Lying Game is set in Salten, an imaginary village near Romney Marsh. According to Ware, the book's setting was inspired by a trip to the French village of Saint-Suliac, where she spotted an "extraordinarily atmospheric" tide mill that she decided to add to a future book. Ware said that the story's boarding school aspect was "entirely fictional", as she had never been to boarding school; she cited stories such as the 1989 film Dead Poets Society and the Donna Tartt novel The Secret History as inspiration.

== Reception ==
The Lying Game appeared on multiple weekly bestseller lists, including The New York Times, The Wall Street Journal, USA Today, and Publishers Weekly. It also appeared on Publishers Weekly's 2018 list of longest-running bestsellers, spending 21 weeks on the trade paperback list. In 2017, The Lying Game was selected by actress Reese Witherspoon for Reese's Book Club.

The Guardian's Laura Wilson said The Lying Game had "no high-octane thrills" and a "straightforward" mystery, but praised the book's "well drawn, complex characters". Maureen Corrigan, for The Washington Post, criticised the novel's "weak opening" but added that it "rallies in its second half", recommending it to readers who are "ready to surrender to the pleasures of the predictable".

Lucy Scholes, in The Independent, rated The Lying Game four out of five stars, writing that "Ware weaves a nicely knotty, and more importantly, plausible mystery" that was "gripping enough to be devoured in a single sitting." Becky Aikman, for The New York Times, said that the book's cryptic opening "signals readers that they're in the hands of a pro", but added that Isa's behaviour as a new mother was sometimes unbelievable. Margaret Quamme, in The Columbus Dispatch, said that the novel was "deeper and richer" than Ware's other two books, complimenting its "psychological complexity" and "satisfyingly dramatic conclusion." In a 2025 ranking of Ware's novels, Nicole Briese of Marie Claire called The Lying Game "the weakest link in her literary arsenal", adding that the book "doesn't compare to the regular pearl-clutching suspense Ware's readers are used to feeling."

Kirkus Reviews gave The Lying Game a starred review, telling readers to "cancel your plans for the weekend" and praising its "slower unraveling of tension and fear" compared with Ware's other novels. Publishers Weekly called the novel "engrossing", adding: "Ware builds up a rock-solid cast of intriguing characters and spins a mystery that will keep readers turning pages to the end." Kiera Parrott, for Library Journal, said the book was "not as chill-inducing" as Ware's previous work, with "a more leisurely pacing" that "values character development over nail-biting suspense."

== Adaptation ==
The Hollywood Reporter announced in 2017 that Entertainment One and Gotham Group were adapting The Lying Game for television, with executive producers Ellen Goldsmith-Vein, Jeremy Bell, and Lindsay Williams. In 2025, Deadline reported that Amazon MGM Studios was developing a young adult TV series based on the novel, with Ted Gold and Susan Rovner as executive producers and Suzanne Heathcote as writer.
