= Ruth Ware =

British author of crime thrillers (born 1977)

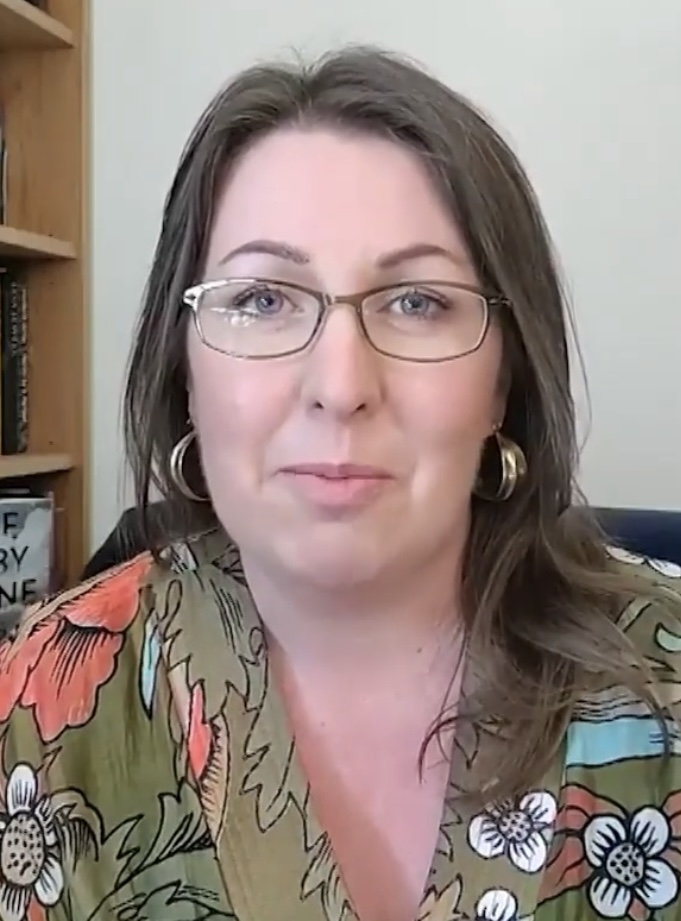
- Ware in 2022
- Born: Ruth Warburton; 26 September 1977 (age 49); Lewes, England, U.K.
- Education: Manchester University
- Occupations: Author, novelist

Ruth Warburton (born 1977), known by the pen name Ruth Ware, is a British author.

== Early life and education ==
Ruth Ware was born in 1977 and grew up in Lewes. She studied English at the University of Manchester, where she developed an interest with Old English and Middle English texts.

Before her writing career, Ware worked as a waitress, a bookseller and a publicist. She also spent time in Paris, teaching English as a foreign language.

== Career ==
Ware's novels include In a Dark, Dark Wood (2015), The Woman in Cabin 10 (2016), The Lying Game (2017), The Death of Mrs Westaway (2018), The Turn of the Key (2019), One by One (2020), The It Girl (2022), Zero Days (2023), One Perfect Couple (2024), and The Woman in Suite 11 (2025). Both In a Dark, Dark Wood and The Woman in Cabin 10 were on the UK's Sunday Times and The New York Times top ten bestseller lists. She is represented by Eve White of the Eve White Literary Agency. She switched to the pen name Ruth Ware to distinguish her crime novels from the young-adult fantasy novels published under her birth name.

== Writing style ==
In her crime books, Ware's writing style is often compared to that of Agatha Christie. Ware has said that some aspects of her writing are directly inspired by Christie. Ware's protagonists are usually ordinary women who find themselves in dangerous situations involving a crime. The first two of Ware's novels feature a murder mystery with a group of people trapped, or otherwise restricted from immediately escaping the dangerous environment. Christie was famously known for utilizing this plot device, in novels such as Murder on the Orient Express. Ware and Christie both choose settings and situations that foster the sense of dread that propels their characters to paranoia and often they react violently as a result. These environments create a sense of isolation for the events to unfold in. Ware's settings play a key role in drawing in the reader and are as essential and integral to her story as the characters.

== Reception ==
The Independent named In A Dark, Dark Wood as "this year's hottest crime novel", and The Guardian praised its "excellent characterisation" and called the book's ending "mesmerising".

In a four-star review, The Independent described The Lying Game as "gripping enough to be devoured in a single sitting," and Kirkus Reviews' writer said "cancel your plans for the weekend when you sit down with this book, because you won’t want to move until it’s over."

== Published works ==
=== Young adult fiction ===
Before writing under the pen name Ruth Ware, she wrote five young-adult fantasy novels, all of which were published by Hodder's Children Books.

- A Witch Alone (2013) 978–1444904710
- A Witch in Winter (2013) 978–1444904697
- A Witch in Love (2013) 978–1444904703
- Witch Finder (2014) 978–1444914467
- Witch Hunt (2014) 978–1444914481

=== As Ruth Ware ===
- In a Dark, Dark Wood (2015) is about a woman who attends a bachelorette party (hen do) of a childhood friend whom she hasn't heard from in years. The party takes place in an isolated glass house in the woods and takes a turn for the worse. By the end of the weekend someone is dead and everyone is a suspect.
- The Woman in Cabin 10 (2016) is about Laura "Lo" Blacklock, a travel journalist who goes on the maiden voyage of the Aurora Borealis, a luxury cruise ship, for an assignment in the Norwegian fjords. Lo is on the trip to further her career, but everything changes when she witnesses what she believes to be a woman being thrown overboard, yet all the passengers remain accounted for and no one believes her.
- The Lying Game (2017) revolves around four girls named Kate Atagon, Fatima Chaudhry (née Qureshy), Thea West, and Isa Wilde who attend a private boarding school called Salten House. At the school, they form a bond from a game of telling lies. The poor actions of the girls' boarding school days resurface years later when they receive a mysterious text from Kate asking them to return to the mill where they hung out as teenagers.
- The Death of Mrs Westaway (2018) is about Hal, a young tarot card reader, who receives a mysterious and large inheritance. When Hal attends the funeral of the deceased it becomes clear that she was not the intended recipient of the inheritance and that she has become involved in a dangerous mystery.
- The Turn of the Key (2019) is about a nanny and four children, written as if updating Henry James's The Turn of the Screw in a 21st-century setting.
- One by One (2020) revolves around the directors and shareholders of a hot new technology company on a corporate retreat at an exclusive ski resort to decide the future of the company. Tensions run high approaching a possible billion-dollar buyout as an avalanche cuts the chalet off from help, and one board member goes missing.
- The It Girl (2022) is about a woman, Hannah de Chastaigne, whose college roommate was murdered while the two attended Oxford University. Ten years later, Hannah discovers that her testimony in court may have resulted in the wrong person being convicted of the crime.
- Miss Marple's Christmas is a short story published in the 2022 collection Marple: Twelve New Stories, which features Agatha Christie's character Miss Marple.
- Zero Days (2023) is about a husband-and-wife duo who use their combined computer hacking and breaking-and-entering skills to penetration test high-security facilities, and then the wife finds her husband murdered.
- One Perfect Couple (2024) is about a couple who are cast on a reality show with 4 other couples in a tropical island paradise. An overnight storm leaves them cut off from the mainland without their phones or anyway to contact the boat or crew that brought them. Tensions run high and contestants start to die and they realize they are trapped on an island with a murderer on the loose.
- The Woman in Suite 11 (2025) is a direct sequel to The Woman in Cabin 10 set and published 10 years after the original book. It follows Lo Blacklock, now married and a mother of 2 boys, as she decides to revive her career as a travel journalist by traveling to a luxury Swiss resort, and includes several characters from the Aurora Borealis.

== Adaptation of works ==
Several of Ware's novels have been optioned for screen.

- In a Dark, Dark Wood (2015): In 2017, New Line Cinema acquired the film rights, at which time Reese Witherspoon's Pacific Standard was attached to produce.
- The Woman in Cabin 10 (2016): In 2016, CBS Films acquired the film rights; the project did not move forward, and in 2024 Netflix announced that it owned the rights, releasing its adaptation, starring Keira Knightley, in October 2025.
- The Lying Game (2017): In 2017, Entertainment One acquired the television rights.
- Zero Days (2023): In 2023, Universal International Studios acquired the television rights.

== Awards and nominations ==
Ware's novels have won or been nominated for a number of awards and end-of-year lists:

- In a Dark, Dark Wood (2015)
  - A BEA Buzz Panel selection
  - An NPR best book of 2015
  - Winner for the 2015 RT Reviewer's Choice Award for Best Suspense Novel
- The Woman in Cabin 10 (2016)
  - Nominated for the 2016 Goodreads Choice Awards Best Mystery & Thriller
  - 2016 Book of the Year Finalist selected by Book of the Month
- The Death of Mrs. Westaway (2018)
  - Nominated for the 2018 Goodreads Choice Awards Best Mystery & Thriller
  - Nominated for the 2019 Audie Awards Best Thriller or Suspense
- The Turn of the Key (2019)
  - Nominated for the 2019 Goodreads Choice Awards Best Mystery & Thriller
- One by One (2020)
  - Shortlisted for the 2021 Ian Fleming Steel Dagger Award at the Crime Writers' Association Awards
  - Nominated for the 2020 Goodreads Choice Awards Best Mystery & Thriller
- The It Girl (2022)
  - Nominated for the 2022 Goodreads Choice Awards Best Mystery & Thriller
  - Nominated for 2023 Theakston's Old Peculier Crime Novel of the Year Award
- Zero Days (2023)
  - Nominated for the 2024 Ned Kelly Awards Best International Crime Novel
- Murder at the Turkish Baths
  - Longlisted for 2025 The Crime Writers' Association's "Short Story Dagger"

== Personal life ==
Ware lives near Brighton.
