= The Woman in Cabin 10 (film) =

2025 film by Simon Stone

- Release poster
- Directed by: Simon Stone
- Screenplay by: Joe Shrapnel; Anna Waterhouse; Simon Stone
- Based on: The Woman in Cabin 10 by Ruth Ware
- Produced by: Debra Hayward; Ilda Diffley
- Starring: Keira Knightley; Guy Pearce; Art Malik; Gugu Mbatha-Raw; Kaya Scodelario; Daniel Ings; Hannah Waddingham
- Cinematography: Ben Davis
- Edited by: Katie Weiland; Mark Day
- Music by: Benjamin Wallfisch
- Production company: Sister
- Distributed by: Netflix
- Release date: October 10, 2025
- Running time: 95 minutes
- Countries: United Kingdom; United States
- Language: English

The Woman in Cabin 10 is a 2025 psychological thriller film directed by Simon Stone, who co-wrote the screenplay with Joe Shrapnel and Anna Waterhouse, based on the 2016 novel by Ruth Ware. The film stars Keira Knightley, Guy Pearce, Art Malik, Gugu Mbatha-Raw, Kaya Scodelario, Daniel Ings and Hannah Waddingham.

Netflix released The Woman in Cabin 10 on October 10, 2025, to mostly middling and poor responses from critics.

== Plot ==
Recovering from the trauma of witnessing a source's murder, the Guardian investigative journalist Laura "Lo" Blacklock receives an invitation from terminally ill billionaire Anne Bullmer. She joins her and her husband Richard, as well as their wealthy guests, aboard their luxury superyacht sailing to a fundraising gala in Norway, to write about the Bullmers' new charitable foundation.

The first evening at sea, Lo ducks into Cabin 10 to avoid her ex-boyfriend Ben, a photographer working for the Bullmers, encountering a mysterious blonde woman there. After dinner, Anne privately reveals to Lo that she has stopped taking her medication, and gives her a copy of the speech she plans to make at the gala to announce she is donating her fortune.

That night, waking to a woman's scream, Lo finds a bloody handprint by Cabin 10 and witnesses someone fall overboard. She alerts the ship, but all passengers are accounted for; no guest is staying in Cabin 10, and the handprint has disappeared. Unnerved, Lo investigates.

The voyage continues, and Anne appears to forget her earlier conversation with Lo, blaming her medication. Lo spots the blonde woman from Ben's photographs of a party attended by fellow passenger Adam, who claims not to remember her. At the spa, someone writes "STOP" on Lo's steamy shower door. Adam is nearby but denies writing it, and Lo learns the ship's security cameras are deactivated for privacy. Sneaking into Cabin 10, Lo finds blonde hair in the sink drain and hides the evidence in her own cabin. She confides in Ben, but suspects her room has been searched after finding a button on the floor.

Lo is pushed off the upper deck into the pool and nearly drowns. The hair and button disappear when her coat is laundered, and she notices Anne's doctor, Robert Mehta, is missing a button. The crew are unwilling to answer Lo's questions, and the irritated guests refuse to believe her suspicions. Barricading herself in her room, Lo spots the woman from Cabin 10 in the hall and follows her to the engine room. Begging Lo to drop her investigation, the woman knocks her unconscious and hides her in a storage room.

Lo realizes that Richard would be disinherited, so he had arranged for a lookalike to assume Anne's identity. Carrie, the woman from Cabin 10, confesses that Richard hired her to impersonate Anne so as to sign over her fortune to him. After privately talking to Lo on the first evening, Anne discovered Richard kissing Carrie, so he killed Anne, then dumped her body overboard. Carrie desperately needs the promised money to help her family, but Lo warns that Richard will kill her after she signs Anne's revised will.

Carrie overhears Richard order Dr. Mehta to find and kill Lo, and Ben returns to the ship as the other guests disembark in Norway. Cornered by Mehta and the ship's complicit captain, Lo is saved by Ben, who is jabbed with a lethal injection. She jumps overboard and swims to shore, while Mehta assures Richard that she could not have survived the freezing waters. Posing as Anne, Carrie reluctantly signs the new will, surprising Anne's legal counsel and drawing suspicion from Anne's bodyguard, Sigrid Nilssen. Richard prepares to have Carrie killed, while Lo explains Anne's murder to Nilssen and offers to prove Richard's guilt.

Lo interrupts Richard in front of the entire gala and, with Carrie's encouragement, reads Anne's speech revealing Richard was to be cut off from her money. In desperation, he declares that Carrie is not Anne and takes her hostage at knifepoint, fleeing to the dock. Nilssen retrieves a rifle and wounds Richard in the shoulder, and Lo kills him with a nearby crank before he can kill Carrie.

Lo publishes her exposé on Richard's crimes, leading Mehta and the captain to be arrested for the murders of Ben and Anne, while Carrie returns home to her daughter.

== Cast ==
- Keira Knightley as Laura "Lo" Blacklock
- Guy Pearce as Richard Bullmer
- David Ajala as Ben Morgan
- Art Malik as Dr. Robert Mehta
- Gugu Mbatha-Raw as Rowan Lonsdale
- Kaya Scodelario as Grace Phillips
- David Morrissey as Thomas Heatherley
- Daniel Ings as Adam Sutherland
- Hannah Waddingham as Heidi Heatherley
- Gitte Witt as Carrie
- Christopher Rygh as Lars Jensen
- Pippa Bennett-Warner as Karla
- John Macmillan as Captain John Addis
- Paul Kaye as Danny Tyler
- Amanda Collin as Sigrid Nilssen
- Lisa Loven Kongsli as Anne Bullmer

== Production ==
CBS acquired the film rights in 2017 for an adaptation of the 2016 novel of the same name by Ruth Ware. It began developing a film with the Gotham Group with Hillary Seitz attached to write the screenplay. In May 2024, Netflix announced that it owned the rights, and Simon Stone was set to direct the film and Keira Knightley to star. That September, Guy Pearce, Hannah Waddingham, Kaya Scodelario, and Gugu Mbatha-Raw were among several new additions announced to the cast.

Principal photography took place on the Isle of Portland in Dorset, England, in September 2024, as well as in Hjørundfjorden in Western Norway. Filming took place on the superyacht Savannah.

== Release ==
The Woman in Cabin 10 was released on Netflix on October 10, 2025.

== Reception ==
On the review aggregator website Rotten Tomatoes, 28% of 90 critics' reviews are positive, with an average rating of 4.7/10. The website's consensus reads: "Saddled with a contrived plot and plodding pacing, The Woman in Cabin 10 throws narrative logic overboard and ultimately sinks." Metacritic, which uses a weighted average, assigned the film a score of 41 out of 100, based on 22 critics, indicating "mixed or average" reviews.

David Rooney for The Hollywood Reporter writes that the film is "blandly glossy" but says it is a "capably acted adaptation." Courtney Howard of Variety stated, "Similar to its book-to-film predecessors The Girl on the Train and The Woman in the Window, The Woman in Cabin 10 also features a gaslit woman who's forced to solve a mystery on her own after witnessing a suspicious incident. And much like the aforementioned beach-reads-turned-Hollywood-thrillers, director-co-writer Simon Stone's adaptation for Netflix also suffers from major missteps by the mid-point, causing any tension to dissipate long before the already-brief run time is up. Still, the sleek production design, symphonic score and performances from a killer ensemble act as a life preserver, making the shenanigans at sea a little less choppy." Lisa Kennedy of the New York Times added, "The thriller The Woman in Cabin 10 — based on the novel by Ruth Ware and directed by Simon Stone — isn't a simple whodunit. There's a great deal afoot once Blacklock, a well-regarded but burned-out reporter, embarks on a feature about an invitation-only cruise to Norway."
