= In a Dark, Dark Wood =

2015 novel by Ruth Ware

- Book cover
- Author: Ruth Ware
- Language: English
- Genre: Psychological thriller
- Set in: London; Northumberland
- Publisher: Scout Press
- Publication date: 2015
- Pages: 496
- ISBN: 9781501112317

In a Dark, Dark Wood is a 2015 psychological thriller novel by British author Ruth Ware. The novel follows Leonora Shaw, a reclusive writer who wakes in hospital with amnesia after attending a deadly hen party at a remote glass house in the English countryside.

== Plot ==
Crime writer Leonora "Nora" Shaw receives a surprise invitation to the hen party of Clare, her childhood best friend, to whom she has not spoken in 10 years. She ultimately agrees to attend together with her friend Nina, another classmate who is now a doctor. Clare's best friend from university Flo, and Clare's other friends Melanie and Tom, are also in attendance.

Nora and Nina travel from London to a modernist glass holiday home in the Kielder Forest, which has a landline phone and spotty mobile network access. A shotgun—loaded with blanks for scaring off rabbits—hangs above the fireplace. Following an afternoon run, Nora encounters Clare on the way back. Clare reveals that she is marrying Nora's ex-boyfriend from secondary school, James. Nora and James broke up at 16 after Nora (who went by "Lee" at school) became pregnant. After a text from James telling her not to call him ever again, Nora had an abortion and transferred to a new school, losing contact with James and Clare. James is now a successful actor, while Nora has struggled to get over the breakup.

The other guests are unnerved by Flo's erratic and clingy behaviour; she copies Clare's outfits and is obsessed with creating the "perfect weekend" for Clare. Returning from a morning run the next day, Nora finds fresh footprints in the snow between the house and the garage. Melanie discovers the phone line is down and decides to leave early, worried about her six-month-old son. That day, the five remaining attendees go clay pigeon shooting. At night, they hear a door swaying in the wind. Flo grabs the shotgun to intimidate any intruders; they lock the door and return to bed. Later, they again hear noises and see a man climbing the stairs, and the shotgun goes off in Flo's hands.

Nora is shocked to see that the man is James, now bleeding profusely; the shotgun blanks were apparently replaced with live shells from the shooting range. Clare drives off with James to hospital, seemingly mishearing Tom's instructions to wait for Nina. The last thing Nora remembers is running after Clare's car; she wakes up in hospital with bruises, cuts, and amnesia. Nora is interviewed by the police and learns that James is dead and Clare is unconscious; James would likely have survived, but died after Clare crashed her car. Nina reveals to Nora that Flo has attempted suicide via paracetamol overdose.

The police confront Nora with her mobile phone, which contains texts to James telling him to come to the house. In addition, Nora's fingerprints are on the steering wheel of Clare's car; the police suspect Nora tried to crash the vehicle after Clare picked her up. Nora believes she is being framed, but cannot trust her own memory. Escaping from hospital, Nora returns to the house, now a crime scene. She recalls finding a coat with the missing shotgun blanks after Clare drove off, which suggests the coat's owner loaded the gun. However, she is uncertain whether it belonged to Clare or Flo, given their similar fashion sense.

Clare arrives at the house and tries to convince Nora that Nora crashed the car due to her jealousy. Nora suddenly remembers that in James' breakup text, he called her "Lee" instead of "Leo" (his pet name for her). She realises that Clare sent the text from James' phone, instigating their breakup so Clare could date him. When James found out about Clare's deception, he wanted to call off the wedding unless Clare told Nora the truth. Clare decided to kill James instead—and frame Nora—to preserve her "perfect" public image. Flo and Clare sent the texts to James from Nora's phone during the times she was out running; they made the footprints in the snow while searching for a mobile signal at the property.

Nora flees, pursued by Clare in her car, but Clare crashes into a police vehicle arriving at the house. Waking up again in hospital, Nora learns that Clare is injured and now the only suspect in James' death. Flo later dies of her overdose. Nora returns home to London and considers getting a coffee with James' best man Matt.

== Background ==
In a Dark, Dark Wood is Ruth Ware's first thriller novel and her first book written under a pseudonym, after having authored several young adult fantasy novels published under her legal name, Ruth Warburton. In a Dark, Dark Wood is also the first book released by Simon & Schuster's Scout Press imprint.

Ware had originally wanted to set the book in Scotland, but changed the setting to Northumberland due to her unfamiliarity with Scottish policing; she would later use a Scottish Highlands setting for her novel The Turn of the Key. In an interview, she called hen parties "the perfect setting for a thriller" because they involve "a group of quite disparate people thrown together" where "emotions are running high." Ware stated that the glass house she used as a setting in the novel was "totally made up... though it does owe a lot to some of the more crazy, modernist projects on Grand Designs". She also said that her use of a glass house was inspired by the horror film Scream, which features "shots where the camera is circling the house looking in through the windows."

Ware describes her own writing as influenced by Agatha Christie, although more emotional and less detached than Agatha Christie's stories.

== Reception ==
In a Dark, Dark Wood appeared on multiple bestseller lists, including The New York Times and Publishers Weekly. The novel was listed in Publishers Weekly's longest-running print bestsellers in trade paperback for both 2016 and 2017.

Jean Zimmerman, for NPR, said In a Dark, Dark Wood was a "suspenseful debut novel" and "an easy read, with some fun twists and turns." The Guardian's Laura Wilson wrote: "Even though it's easy to guess what's going to happen, some excellent characterisation gives the ending a mesmerising, slow-motion car-crash appeal." Charles Finch, for USA Today, admired the book's "intriguing premise", "eerie atmosphere", and "fluid storytelling" while criticising its reliance on amnesia as a plot point.

Entertainment Weekly's Isabella Biedenharn called In a Dark, Dark Wood a "twisting, electrifying debut" whose "foggy atmosphere and chilling revelations will leave you breathless." In October 2015, actress Reese Witherspoon recommended the novel on her Instagram account, writing: "I almost bit all my fingernails off!" In a 2026 New York Times article, author Mary Kubica named the book as one of her favorite thriller novels set in remote cabins, saying it would "keep you turning the pages late into the night."

Kirkus Reviews wrote that the book's ending was "pretty predictable", but praised Ware's ability to create "a unique setting" and "a constant undercurrent of danger." Publishers Weekly called the book "solid but somewhat derivative," adding: "Ware does a competent job ratcheting up the suspense, but the revelations aren't as exciting as the buildup."

== Adaptation ==
In September 2015, it was announced that Reese Witherspoon was developing a film based on In a Dark, Dark Wood, with New Line Cinema acquiring the film rights. Screenwriter Arash Amel joined the project in 2018.
