= Academy Award for Best Sound =

Award for excellence in sound editing and sound mixing in film

- Country: United States
- Presented by: Academy of Motion Picture Arts and Sciences (AMPAS)
- First award: November 5, 1930; 96 years ago (for films released during the 1929/1930 film season)
- Most recent winner: Al Nelson, Gwendolyn Yates Whittle, Gary A. Rizzo, Juan Peralta and Gareth John; F1 (2025)
- Website: oscars.org

The Academy Award for Best Sound is an Academy Award that recognizes the finest sound mixing, recording, sound design, and sound editing. The award used to go to the studio sound departments until a rule change in 1969 said it should be awarded to the specific technicians, the first of whom were Murray Spivack and Jack Solomon for Hello, Dolly!. It is generally awarded to the production sound mixers, re-recording mixers, and supervising sound editors of the winning film. In the lists below, the winner of the award for each year is shown first, followed by the other nominees. For the respective periods from 1963 to 1967 and 1982 to 2019, competitive awards for sound were presented in two separate categories: Best Sound Mixing (just called Best Sound in some years) and Best Sound Effects Editing (just called Best Sound Effects, or Best Sound Editing in some years).

For the second and third years of this category (i.e., the 4th Academy Awards and the 5th Academy Awards) only the names of the film companies were listed. Paramount Publix Studio Sound Department won in both years.

== Winners and nominees ==
=== 1930s ===
Year	Film	Nominees
1929–1930 (3rd)	The Big House	Metro-Goldwyn-Mayer Studio Sound Department, Douglas Shearer
1929–1930 (3rd)	The Case of Sergeant Grischa	RKO Radio Studio Sound Department, John Tribby
1929–1930 (3rd)	The Love Parade	Paramount Famous Lasky Studio Sound Department, Franklin B. Hansen
1929–1930 (3rd)	Raffles	United Artists Studio Sound Department, Oscar Lagerstrom
1929–1930 (3rd)	Song of the Flame	First National Studio Sound Department, George Groves
1930–1931 (4th)	Paramount Publix Studio Sound Department (Note: These nominations were not associated with any individual film title.)	
1930–1931 (4th)	Metro-Goldwyn-Mayer Studio Sound Department	
1930–1931 (4th)	RKO Radio Studio Sound Department	
1930–1931 (4th)	Samuel Goldwyn-United Artists Studio Sound Department	
1931–1932 (5th)	Paramount Publix Studio Sound Department	
1931–1932 (5th)	Metro-Goldwyn-Mayer Studio Sound Department	
1931–1932 (5th)	RKO Radio Studio Sound Department	
1931–1932 (5th)	Warner Bros.-First National Studio Sound Department	
1932–1933 (6th)	A Farewell to Arms	Paramount Studio Sound Department, Franklin B. Hansen
1932–1933 (6th)	42nd Street	Warner Bros. Studio Sound Department, Nathan Levinson
1932–1933 (6th)	Gold Diggers of 1933	Warner Bros. Studio Sound Department, Nathan Levinson
1932–1933 (6th)	I Am a Fugitive from a Chain Gang	Warner Bros. Studio Sound Department, Nathan Levinson
1934 (7th)	One Night of Love	Columbia Studio Sound Department, John P. Livadary
1934 (7th)	The Affairs of Cellini	United Artists Studio Sound Department, Thomas T. Moulton
1934 (7th)	Cleopatra	Paramount Studio Sound Department, Franklin B. Hansen
1934 (7th)	Flirtation Walk	Warner Bros.-First National Studio Sound Department, Nathan Levinson
1934 (7th)	The Gay Divorcee	RKO Radio Studio Sound Department, Carl Dreher
1934 (7th)	Imitation of Life	Universal Studio Sound Department, Theodore Soderberg
1934 (7th)	Viva Villa!	Metro-Goldwyn-Mayer Studio Sound Department, Douglas Shearer
1934 (7th)	The White Parade	20th Century-Fox Studio Sound Department, Edmund H. Hansen
1935 (8th)	Naughty Marietta	Metro-Goldwyn-Mayer Studio Sound Department, Douglas Shearer
1935 (8th)	$1,000 a Minute	Republic Studio Sound Department
1935 (8th)	Bride of Frankenstein	Universal Studio Sound Department, Gilbert Kurland
1935 (8th)	Captain Blood	Warner Bros.-First National Studio Sound Department, Nathan Levinson
1935 (8th)	The Dark Angel	United Artists Studio Sound Department, Thomas T. Moulton
1935 (8th)	I Dream Too Much	RKO Radio Studio Sound Department, Carl Dreher
1935 (8th)	The Lives of a Bengal Lancer	Paramount Studio Sound Department, Franklin B. Hansen
1935 (8th)	Love Me Forever	Columbia Studio Sound Department, John P. Livadary
1935 (8th)	Thanks a Million	20th Century-Fox Studio Sound Department, Edmund H. Hansen
1936 (9th)	San Francisco	Metro-Goldwyn-Mayer Studio Sound Department, Douglas Shearer
1936 (9th)	Banjo on My Knee	20th Century-Fox Studio Sound Department, Edmund H. Hansen
1936 (9th)	The Charge of the Light Brigade	Warner Bros. Studio Sound Department, Nathan Levinson
1936 (9th)	Dodsworth	United Artists Studio Sound Department, Thomas T. Moulton
1936 (9th)	General Spanky	Hal Roach Studio Sound Department, Elmer A. Raguse
1936 (9th)	Mr. Deeds Goes to Town	Columbia Studio Sound Department, John P. Livadary
1936 (9th)	The Texas Rangers	Paramount Studio Sound Department, Franklin B. Hansen
1936 (9th)	That Girl from Paris	RKO Radio Studio Sound Department, John O. Aalberg
1936 (9th)	Three Smart Girls	Universal Studio Sound Department, Homer G. Tasker
1937 (10th)	The Hurricane	United Artists Studio Sound Department, Thomas T. Moulton
1937 (10th)	The Girl Said No	Grand National Studio Sound Department, A. E. Kaye
1937 (10th)	Hitting a New High	RKO Radio Studio Sound Department, John O. Aalberg
1937 (10th)	In Old Chicago	20th Century-Fox Studio Sound Department, Edmund H. Hansen
1937 (10th)	The Life of Emile Zola	Warner Bros. Studio Sound Department, Nathan Levinson
1937 (10th)	Lost Horizon	Columbia Studio Sound Department, John P. Livadary
1937 (10th)	Maytime	Metro-Goldwyn-Mayer Studio Sound Department, Douglas Shearer
1937 (10th)	One Hundred Men and a Girl	Universal Studio Sound Department, Homer G. Tasker
1937 (10th)	Topper	Hal Roach Studio Sound Department, Elmer A. Raguse
1937 (10th)	Wells Fargo	Paramount Studio Sound Department, Loren L. Ryder
1938 (11th)	The Cowboy and the Lady	United Artists Studio Sound Department, Thomas T. Moulton
1938 (11th)	Army Girl	Republic Studio Sound Department, Charles L. Lootens
1938 (11th)	Four Daughters	Warner Bros. Studio Sound Department, Nathan Levinson
1938 (11th)	If I Were King	Paramount Studio Sound Department, Loren L. Ryder
1938 (11th)	Merrily We Live	Hal Roach Studio Sound Department, Elmer A. Raguse
1938 (11th)	Suez	20th Century-Fox Studio Sound Department, Edmund H. Hansen
1938 (11th)	Sweethearts	Metro-Goldwyn-Mayer Studio Sound Department, Douglas Shearer
1938 (11th)	That Certain Age	Universal Studio Sound Department, Bernard B. Brown
1938 (11th)	Vivacious Lady	RKO Radio Studio Sound Department, John O. Aalberg
1938 (11th)	You Can't Take It with You	Columbia Studio Sound Department, John P. Livadary
1939 (12th)	When Tomorrow Comes	Universal Studio Sound Department, Bernard B. Brown
1939 (12th)	Balalaika	Metro-Goldwyn-Mayer Studio Sound Department, Douglas Shearer
1939 (12th)	Gone with the Wind	Samuel Goldwyn Studio Sound Department, Thomas T. Moulton
1939 (12th)	Goodbye, Mr. Chips	Denham Studio Sound Department, A. W. Watkins
1939 (12th)	The Great Victor Herbert	Paramount Studio Sound Department, Loren L. Ryder
1939 (12th)	The Hunchback of Notre Dame	RKO Radio Studio Sound Department, John O. Aalberg
1939 (12th)	Man of Conquest	Republic Studio Sound Department, Charles L. Lootens
1939 (12th)	Mr. Smith Goes to Washington	Columbia Studio Sound Department, John P. Livadary
1939 (12th)	Of Mice and Men	Hal Roach Studio Sound Department, Elmer A. Raguse
1939 (12th)	The Private Lives of Elizabeth and Essex	Warner Bros. Studio Sound Department, Nathan Levinson
1939 (12th)	The Rains Came	20th Century-Fox Studio Sound Department, Edmund H. Hansen

=== 1940s ===
Year	Film	Nominees
1940 (13th)	Strike Up the Band	Metro-Goldwyn-Mayer Studio Sound Department, Douglas Shearer
1940 (13th)	Behind the News	Republic Studio Sound Department, Charles L. Lootens
1940 (13th)	Captain Caution	Hal Roach Studio Sound Department, Elmer A. Raguse
1940 (13th)	The Grapes of Wrath	20th Century-Fox Studio Sound Department, Edmund H. Hansen
1940 (13th)	The Howards of Virginia	General Service Sound Department, Jack Whitney
1940 (13th)	Kitty Foyle	RKO Radio Studio Sound Department, John O. Aalberg
1940 (13th)	North West Mounted Police	Paramount Studio Sound Department, Loren L. Ryder
1940 (13th)	Our Town	Samuel Goldwyn Studio Sound Department, Thomas T. Moulton
1940 (13th)	The Sea Hawk	Warner Bros. Studio Sound Department, Nathan Levinson
1940 (13th)	Spring Parade	Universal Studio Sound Department, Bernard B. Brown
1940 (13th)	Too Many Husbands	Columbia Studio Sound Department, John P. Livadary
1941 (14th)	That Hamilton Woman	General Service Sound Department, Jack Whitney
1941 (14th)	Appointment for Love	Universal Studio Sound Department, Bernard B. Brown
1941 (14th)	Ball of Fire	Samuel Goldwyn Studio Sound Department, Thomas T. Moulton
1941 (14th)	The Chocolate Soldier	Metro-Goldwyn-Mayer Studio Sound Department, Douglas Shearer
1941 (14th)	Citizen Kane	RKO Radio Studio Sound Department, John O. Aalberg
1941 (14th)	The Devil Pays Off	Republic Studio Sound Department, Charles L. Lootens
1941 (14th)	How Green Was My Valley	20th Century-Fox Studio Sound Department, Edmund H. Hansen
1941 (14th)	The Men in Her Life	Columbia Studio Sound Department, John P. Livadary
1941 (14th)	Sergeant York	Warner Bros. Studio Sound Department, Nathan Levinson
1941 (14th)	Skylark	Paramount Studio Sound Department, Loren L. Ryder
1941 (14th)	Topper Returns	Hal Roach Studio Sound Department, Elmer A. Raguse
1942 (15th)	Yankee Doodle Dandy	Warner Bros. Studio Sound Department, Nathan Levinson
1942 (15th)	Arabian Nights	Universal Studio Sound Department, Bernard B. Brown
1942 (15th)	Bambi	Walt Disney Studio Sound Department, Sam Slyfield
1942 (15th)	Flying Tigers	Republic Studio Sound Department, Daniel J. Bloomberg
1942 (15th)	Friendly Enemies	Sound Service, Inc., Jack Whitney
1942 (15th)	The Gold Rush	RCA Sound, James L. Fields
1942 (15th)	Mrs. Miniver	Metro-Goldwyn-Mayer Studio Sound Department, Douglas Shearer
1942 (15th)	Once Upon a Honeymoon	RKO Radio Studio Sound Department, Steve Dunn
1942 (15th)	The Pride of the Yankees	Samuel Goldwyn Studio Sound Department, Thomas T. Moulton
1942 (15th)	Road to Morocco	Paramount Studio Sound Department, Loren L. Ryder
1942 (15th)	This Above All	20th Century-Fox Studio Sound Department, Edmund H. Hansen
1942 (15th)	You Were Never Lovelier	Columbia Studio Sound Department, John P. Livadary
1943 (16th)	This Land Is Mine	RKO Radio Studio Sound Department, Steve Dunn
1943 (16th)	Hangmen Also Die!	Sound Service, Inc., Jack Whitney
1943 (16th)	In Old Oklahoma	Republic Studio Sound Department, Daniel J. Bloomberg
1943 (16th)	Madame Curie	Metro-Goldwyn-Mayer Studio Sound Department, Douglas Shearer
1943 (16th)	The North Star	Samuel Goldwyn Studio Sound Department, Thomas T. Moulton
1943 (16th)	Phantom of the Opera	Universal Studio Sound Department, Bernard B. Brown
1943 (16th)	Riding High	Paramount Studio Sound Department, Loren L. Ryder
1943 (16th)	Sahara	Columbia Studio Sound Department, John P. Livadary
1943 (16th)	Saludos Amigos	Walt Disney Studio Sound Department, Sam Slyfield
1943 (16th)	So This Is Washington	RCA Sound, James L. Fields
1943 (16th)	The Song of Bernadette	20th Century-Fox Studio Sound Department, Edmund H. Hansen
1943 (16th)	This Is the Army	Warner Bros. Studio Sound Department, Nathan Levinson
1944 (17th)	Wilson	20th Century-Fox Studio Sound Department, Edmund H. Hansen
1944 (17th)	Brazil	Republic Studio Sound Department, Daniel J. Bloomberg
1944 (17th)	Casanova Brown	Samuel Goldwyn Studio Sound Department, Thomas T. Moulton
1944 (17th)	Cover Girl	Columbia Studio Sound Department, John P. Livadary
1944 (17th)	Double Indemnity	Paramount Studio Sound Department, Loren L. Ryder
1944 (17th)	His Butler's Sister	Universal Studio Sound Department, Bernard B. Brown
1944 (17th)	Hollywood Canteen	Warner Bros. Studio Sound Department, Nathan Levinson
1944 (17th)	It Happened Tomorrow	Sound Service, Inc., Jack Whitney
1944 (17th)	Kismet	Metro-Goldwyn-Mayer Studio Sound Department, Douglas Shearer
1944 (17th)	Music in Manhattan	RKO Radio Studio Sound Department, Steve Dunn
1944 (17th)	Voice in the Wind	RCA Sound, Mac Dalgleish
1945 (18th)	The Bells of St. Mary's	RKO Radio Studio Sound Department, Steve Dunn
1945 (18th)	Flame of Barbary Coast	Republic Studio Sound Department, Daniel J. Bloomberg
1945 (18th)	Lady on a Train	Universal Studio Sound Department, Bernard B. Brown
1945 (18th)	Leave Her to Heaven	20th Century-Fox Studio Sound Department, Thomas T. Moulton
1945 (18th)	Rhapsody in Blue	Warner Bros. Studio Sound Department, Nathan Levinson
1945 (18th)	A Song to Remember	Columbia Studio Sound Department, John P. Livadary
1945 (18th)	The Southerner	General Service Studios, Jack Whitney
1945 (18th)	They Were Expendable	Metro-Goldwyn-Mayer Studio Sound Department, Douglas Shearer
1945 (18th)	The Three Caballeros	Walt Disney Studio Sound Department, Sam Slyfield
1945 (18th)	Three Is a Family	RCA Sound, W. V. Wolfe
1945 (18th)	The Unseen	Paramount Studio Sound Department, Loren L. Ryder
1945 (18th)	Wonder Man	Samuel Goldwyn Studio Sound Department, Gordon E. Sawyer
1946 (19th)	The Jolson Story	Columbia Studio Sound Department, John P. Livadary
1946 (19th)	The Best Years of Our Lives	Samuel Goldwyn Studio Sound Department, Gordon E. Sawyer
1946 (19th)	It's a Wonderful Life	RKO Radio Studio Sound Department, John O. Aalberg
1947 (20th)	The Bishop's Wife	Samuel Goldwyn Studio Sound Department, Gordon E. Sawyer
1947 (20th)	Green Dolphin Street	Metro-Goldwyn-Mayer Studio Sound Department, Douglas Shearer
1947 (20th)	T-Men	Sound Service, Inc., Jack Whitney
1948 (21st)	The Snake Pit	20th Century-Fox Studio Sound Department, Thomas T. Moulton
1948 (21st)	Johnny Belinda	Warner Bros. Studio Sound Department, Col. Nathan Levinson
1948 (21st)	Moonrise	Republic Studio Sound Department, Daniel J. Bloomberg
1949 (22nd)	Twelve O'Clock High	20th Century-Fox Studio Sound Department, Thomas T. Moulton
1949 (22nd)	Once More, My Darling	Universal-International Studio Sound Department, Leslie I. Carey
1949 (22nd)	Sands of Iwo Jima	Republic Studio Sound Department, Daniel J. Bloomberg

=== 1950s ===
Year	Film	Nominees
1950 (23rd)	All About Eve	20th Century-Fox Studio Sound Department, Thomas T. Moulton
1950 (23rd)	Cinderella	Walt Disney Studio Sound Department, Sam Slyfield
1950 (23rd)	Louisa	Universal-International Studio Sound Department, Leslie I. Carey
1950 (23rd)	Our Very Own	Samuel Goldwyn Studio Sound Department, Gordon E. Sawyer
1950 (23rd)	Trio	Pinewood Studio Sound Department, Cyril Crowhurst
1951 (24th)	The Great Caruso	Metro-Goldwyn-Mayer Studio Sound Department, Douglas Shearer
1951 (24th)	Bright Victory	Universal-International Studio Sound Department, Leslie I. Carey
1951 (24th)	I Want You	Samuel Goldwyn Studio Sound Department, Gordon E. Sawyer
1951 (24th)	A Streetcar Named Desire	Warner Bros. Studio Sound Department, Col. Nathan Levinson
1951 (24th)	Two Tickets to Broadway	RKO Studio Sound Department, John O. Aalberg
1952 (25th)	Breaking the Sound Barrier	London Film Sound Department
1952 (25th)	Hans Christian Andersen	Samuel Goldwyn Studio Sound Department, Gordon E. Sawyer
1952 (25th)	The Promoter	Pinewood Studio Sound Department
1952 (25th)	The Quiet Man	Republic Studio Sound Department, Daniel J. Bloomberg
1952 (25th)	With a Song in My Heart	20th Century-Fox Studio Sound Department, Thomas T. Moulton
1953 (26th)	From Here to Eternity	Columbia Studio Sound Department, John P. Livadary
1953 (26th)	Calamity Jane	Warner Bros. Studio Sound Department, William A. Mueller
1953 (26th)	Knights of the Round Table	Metro-Goldwyn-Mayer Studio Sound Department, A. W. Watkins
1953 (26th)	The Mississippi Gambler	Universal-International Studio Sound Department, Leslie I. Carey
1953 (26th)	The War of the Worlds	Paramount Studio Sound Department, Loren L. Ryder
1954 (27th)	The Glenn Miller Story	Universal-International Studio Sound Department, Leslie I. Carey
1954 (27th)	Brigadoon	Metro-Goldwyn-Mayer Studio Sound Department, Wesley C. Miller
1954 (27th)	The Caine Mutiny	Columbia Studio Sound Department, John P. Livadary
1954 (27th)	Rear Window	Paramount Studio Sound Department, Loren L. Ryder
1954 (27th)	Susan Slept Here	RKO Studio Sound Department, John O. Aalberg
1955 (28th)	Oklahoma!	Todd-AO Studio Sound Department, Fred Hynes
1955 (28th)	Love Is a Many-Splendored Thing	20th Century-Fox Studio Sound Department, Carlton W. Faulkner
1955 (28th)	Love Me or Leave Me	Metro-Goldwyn-Mayer Studio Sound Department, Wesley C. Miller
1955 (28th)	Mister Roberts	Warner Bros. Studio Sound Department, William A. Mueller
1955 (28th)	Not as a Stranger	Radio Corporation of America Sound Department, Watson Jones
1956 (29th)	The King and I	20th Century-Fox Studio Sound Department, Carlton W. Faulkner
1956 (29th)	The Brave One	King Bros. Productions, Inc. Sound Department, Buddy Myers
1956 (29th)	The Eddy Duchin Story	Columbia Studio Sound Department, John P. Livadary
1956 (29th)	Friendly Persuasion	Westrex Sound Services, Inc., Gordon R. Glennan; Samuel Goldwyn Studio Sound Department, Gordon E. Sawyer
1956 (29th)	The Ten Commandments	Paramount Studio Sound Department, Loren L. Ryder
1957 (30th)	Sayonara	Warner Bros. Studio Sound Department, George Groves
1957 (30th)	Gunfight at the O.K. Corral	Paramount Studio Sound Department, George Dutton
1957 (30th)	Les Girls	Metro-Goldwyn-Mayer Studio Sound Department, Wesley C. Miller
1957 (30th)	Pal Joey	Columbia Studio Sound Department, John P. Livadary
1957 (30th)	Witness for the Prosecution	Samuel Goldwyn Studio Sound Department, Gordon E. Sawyer
1958 (31st)	South Pacific	Todd-AO Studio Sound Department, Fred Hynes
1958 (31st)	I Want to Live!	Samuel Goldwyn Studio Sound Department, Gordon E. Sawyer
1958 (31st)	A Time to Love and a Time to Die	Universal-International Studio Sound Department, Leslie I. Carey
1958 (31st)	Vertigo	Paramount Studio Sound Department, George Dutton
1958 (31st)	The Young Lions	20th Century-Fox Studio Sound Department, Carlton W. Faulkner
1959 (32nd)	Ben-Hur	Metro-Goldwyn-Mayer Studio Sound Department, Franklin E. Milton
1959 (32nd)	Journey to the Center of the Earth	20th Century-Fox Studio Sound Department, Carlton W. Faulkner
1959 (32nd)	Libel	Metro-Goldwyn-Mayer Studio Sound Department, A. W. Watkins
1959 (32nd)	The Nun's Story	Warner Bros. Studio Sound Department, George Groves
1959 (32nd)	Porgy and Bess	Samuel Goldwyn Studio Sound Department, Gordon E. Sawyer; Todd-AO Studio Sound Department, Fred Hynes

=== 1960s ===
Year	Film	Nominees
1960 (33rd)	The Alamo	Todd-AO Sound Department, Fred Hynes; Samuel Goldwyn Studio Sound Department, Gordon E. Sawyer
1960 (33rd)	The Apartment	Samuel Goldwyn Studio Sound Department, Gordon E. Sawyer
1960 (33rd)	Cimarron	Metro-Goldwyn-Mayer Studio Sound Department, Franklin E. Milton
1960 (33rd)	Pepe	Columbia Studio Sound Department, Charles Rice
1960 (33rd)	Sunrise at Campobello	Warner Bros. Studio Sound Department, George R. Groves
1961 (34th)	West Side Story	Todd-AO Sound Department, Fred Hynes; Samuel Goldwyn Studio Sound Department, Gordon E. Sawyer
1961 (34th)	The Children's Hour	Samuel Goldwyn Studio Sound Department, Gordon E. Sawyer
1961 (34th)	Flower Drum Song	Revue Studio Sound Department, Waldon O. Watson
1961 (34th)	The Guns of Navarone	Shepperton Studio Sound Department, John Cox
1961 (34th)	The Parent Trap	Walt Disney Studio Sound Department, Robert O. Cook
1962 (35th)	Lawrence of Arabia	Shepperton Studio Sound Department, John Cox
1962 (35th)	Bon Voyage!	Walt Disney Studio Sound Department, Robert O. Cook
1962 (35th)	The Music Man	Warner Bros. Studio Sound Department, George Groves
1962 (35th)	That Touch of Mink	Universal City Studio Sound Department, Waldon O. Watson
1962 (35th)	What Ever Happened to Baby Jane?	Glen Glenn Sound Department, Joseph D. Kelly
1963 (36th)	Best Sound	
1963 (36th)	How the West Was Won	Metro-Goldwyn-Mayer Studio Sound Department, Franklin E. Milton
1963 (36th)	Bye Bye Birdie	Columbia Studio Sound Department, Charles Rice
1963 (36th)	Captain Newman, M.D.	Universal City Studio Sound Department, Waldon O. Watson
1963 (36th)	Cleopatra	20th Century-Fox Studio Sound Department, James P. Corcoran; Todd-AO Sound Department, Fred Hynes
1963 (36th)	It's a Mad, Mad, Mad, Mad World	Samuel Goldwyn Studio Sound Department, Gordon E. Sawyer
1963 (36th)	Best Sound Effects	
1963 (36th)	It's a Mad, Mad, Mad, Mad World	Walter Elliott
1963 (36th)	A Gathering of Eagles	Robert Bratton
1964 (37th)	Best Sound	
1964 (37th)	My Fair Lady	Warner Bros. Studio Sound Department, George R. Groves
1964 (37th)	Becket	Shepperton Studio Sound Department, John Cox
1964 (37th)	Father Goose	Universal City Studio Sound Department, Waldon O. Watson
1964 (37th)	Mary Poppins	Walt Disney Studio Sound Department, Robert O. Cook
1964 (37th)	The Unsinkable Molly Brown	Metro-Goldwyn-Mayer Studio Sound Department, Franklin E. Milton
1964 (37th)	Best Sound Effects	
1964 (37th)	Goldfinger	Norman Wanstall
1964 (37th)	The Lively Set	Robert Bratton
1965 (38th)	Best Sound	
1965 (38th)	The Sound of Music	20th Century-Fox Studio Sound Department, James P. Corcoran; Todd-AO Sound Department, Fred Hynes
1965 (38th)	The Agony and the Ecstasy	20th Century-Fox Studio Sound Department, James P. Corcoran
1965 (38th)	Doctor Zhivago	Metro-Goldwyn-Mayer British Studio Sound Department, A. W. Watkins; Metro-Goldwyn-Mayer Studio Sound Department, Franklin E. Milton
1965 (38th)	The Great Race	Warner Bros. Studio Sound Department, George R. Groves
1965 (38th)	Shenandoah	Universal City Studio Sound Department, Waldon O. Watson
1965 (38th)	Best Sound Effects	
1965 (38th)	The Great Race	Treg Brown
1965 (38th)	Von Ryan's Express	Walter Rossi
1966 (39th)	Best Sound	
1966 (39th)	Grand Prix	Metro-Goldwyn-Mayer Studio Sound Department, Franklin E. Milton
1966 (39th)	Gambit	Universal City Studio Sound Department, Waldon O. Watson
1966 (39th)	Hawaii	Samuel Goldwyn Studio Sound Department, Gordon E. Sawyer
1966 (39th)	The Sand Pebbles	20th Century-Fox Studio Sound Department, James P. Corcoran
1966 (39th)	Who's Afraid of Virginia Woolf?	Warner Bros. Studio Sound Department, George Groves
1966 (39th)	Best Sound Effects	
1966 (39th)	Grand Prix	Gordon Daniel
1966 (39th)	Fantastic Voyage	Walter Rossi
1967 (40th)	Best Sound	
1967 (40th)	In the Heat of the Night	Samuel Goldwyn Studio Sound Department
1967 (40th)	Camelot	Warner Bros.-Seven Arts Studio Sound Department
1967 (40th)	The Dirty Dozen	Metro-Goldwyn-Mayer Studio Sound Department
1967 (40th)	Doctor Dolittle	20th Century-Fox Studio Sound Department
1967 (40th)	Thoroughly Modern Millie	Universal City Studio Sound Department
1967 (40th)	Best Sound Effects	
1967 (40th)	The Dirty Dozen	John Poyner
1967 (40th)	In the Heat of the Night	James Richard
1968 (41st)
1968 (41st)	Oliver!	Shepperton Studio Sound Department
1968 (41st)	Bullitt	Warner Bros.-Seven Arts Studio Sound Department
1968 (41st)	Finian's Rainbow	Warner Bros.-Seven Arts Studio Sound Department
1968 (41st)	Funny Girl	Columbia Studio Sound Department
1968 (41st)	Star!	20th Century-Fox Studio Sound Department
1969 (42nd)	Hello, Dolly!	Jack Solomon and Murray Spivack
1969 (42nd)	Anne of the Thousand Days	John Aldred
1969 (42nd)	Butch Cassidy and the Sundance Kid	William Edmondson and David Dockendorf
1969 (42nd)	Gaily, Gaily	Robert Martin and Clem Portman
1969 (42nd)	Marooned	Les Fresholtz and Arthur Piantadosi

=== 1970s ===
Year	Film	Nominees
1970 (43rd)	Patton	Douglas Williams and Don Bassman
1970 (43rd)	Airport	Ronald Pierce and David H. Moriarty
1970 (43rd)	Ryan's Daughter	Gordon McCallum and John Bramall
1970 (43rd)	Tora! Tora! Tora!	Murray Spivack and Herman Lewis
1970 (43rd)	Woodstock	Dan Wallin and Larry Johnson
1971 (44th)	Fiddler on the Roof	Gordon McCallum and David Hildyard
1971 (44th)	Diamonds Are Forever	Gordon McCallum, John W. Mitchell and Al Overton
1971 (44th)	The French Connection	Theodore Soderberg and Christopher Newman
1971 (44th)	Kotch	Richard Portman and Jack Solomon
1971 (44th)	Mary, Queen of Scots	Bob Jones and John Aldred
1972 (45th)	Cabaret	Robert Knudson and David Hildyard
1972 (45th)	Butterflies Are Free	Arthur Piantadosi and Charles T. Knight
1972 (45th)	The Candidate	Richard Portman and Gene Cantamessa
1972 (45th)	The Godfather	Charles Grenzbach, Richard Portman and Christopher Newman
1972 (45th)	The Poseidon Adventure	Theodore Soderberg and Herman Lewis
1973 (46th)	The Exorcist	Robert Knudson and Christopher Newman
1973 (46th)	The Day of the Dolphin	Richard Portman and Larry Jost
1973 (46th)	The Paper Chase	Donald O. Mitchell and Larry Jost
1973 (46th)	Paper Moon	Richard Portman and Les Fresholtz
1973 (46th)	The Sting	Ronald Pierce and Robert R. Bertrand
1974 (47th)	Earthquake	Ronald Pierce and Melvin Metcalfe Sr.
1974 (47th)	Chinatown	Charles Grenzbach and Larry Jost
1974 (47th)	The Conversation	Walter Murch and Art Rochester
1974 (47th)	The Towering Inferno	Theodore Soderberg and Herman Lewis
1974 (47th)	Young Frankenstein	Richard Portman and Gene Cantamessa
1975 (48th)	Best Sound	
1975 (48th)	Jaws	Robert Hoyt, Roger Heman Jr., Earl Madery and John Carter
1975 (48th)	Bite the Bullet	Arthur Piantadosi, Les Fresholtz, Richard Tyler and Al Overton Jr.
1975 (48th)	Funny Lady	Richard Portman, Don MacDougall, Curly Thirlwell and Jack Solomon
1975 (48th)	The Hindenburg	Leonard Peterson, John A. Bolger Jr., John L. Mack and Don Sharpless
1975 (48th)	The Wind and the Lion	Harry W. Tetrick, Aaron Rochin, William McCaughey and Roy Charman
1975 (48th)	Special Achievement Award (Sound Effects) (Note: This was presented as a Special Achievement Award, not competitively.)	
1975 (48th)	The Hindenburg	Peter Berkos
1976 (49th)	Best Sound	
1976 (49th)	All the President's Men	Arthur Piantadosi, Les Fresholtz, Dick Alexander and Jim Webb
1976 (49th)	King Kong	Harry W. Tetrick (posthumously), William McCaughey, Aaron Rochin and Jack Solomon
1976 (49th)	Rocky	Harry W. Tetrick (posthumously), William McCaughey, Lyle J. Burbridge and Bud Alper
1976 (49th)	Silver Streak	Donald O. Mitchell, Douglas Williams, Richard Tyler and Harold M. Etherington
1976 (49th)	A Star Is Born	Robert Knudson, Dan Wallin, Robert Glass and Tom Overton
1977 (50th)	Best Sound	
1977 (50th)	Star Wars	Don MacDougall, Ray West, Bob Minkler and Derek Ball
1977 (50th)	Close Encounters of the Third Kind	Robert Knudson, Robert Glass, Don MacDougall and Gene Cantamessa
1977 (50th)	The Deep	Walter Goss, Dick Alexander, Tom Beckert and Robin Gregory
1977 (50th)	Sorcerer	Robert Knudson, Robert Glass, Richard Tyler and Jean-Louis Ducarme
1977 (50th)	The Turning Point	Theodore Soderberg, Paul Wells, Douglas Williams and Jerry Jost
1977 (50th)	Special Achievement Academy Award (Sound Effects Editing)	
1977 (50th)	Close Encounters of the Third Kind	Frank E. Warner
1978 (51st)	Best Sound	
1978 (51st)	The Deer Hunter	Richard Portman, William McCaughey, Aaron Rochin and Darin Knight
1978 (51st)	The Buddy Holly Story	Tex Rudloff, Joel Fein, Curly Thirlwell and Willie D. Burton
1978 (51st)	Days of Heaven	John Wilkinson, Robert W. Glass Jr., John T. Reitz and Barry Thomas
1978 (51st)	Hooper	Robert Knudson, Robert Glass, Don MacDougall and Jack Solomon
1978 (51st)	Superman	Gordon McCallum, Graham V. Hartstone, Nicolas Le Messurier and Roy Charman
1979 (52nd)	Best Sound	
1979 (52nd)	Apocalypse Now	Walter Murch, Mark Berger, Richard Beggs and Nat Boxer
1979 (52nd)	The Electric Horseman	Arthur Piantadosi, Les Fresholtz, Michael Minkler and Al Overton Jr.
1979 (52nd)	Meteor	William McCaughey, Aaron Rochin, Michael J. Kohut and Jack Solomon
1979 (52nd)	1941	Robert Knudson, Robert Glass, Don MacDougall and Gene Cantamessa
1979 (52nd)	The Rose	Theodore Soderberg, Douglas Williams, Paul Wells and Jim Webb
1979 (52nd)	Special Achievement Academy Award (Sound Editing)	
1979 (52nd)	The Black Stallion	Alan Splet

=== 1980s ===
Year	Film	Nominees
1980 (53rd)	The Empire Strikes Back	Bill Varney, Steve Maslow, Gregg Landaker and Peter Sutton
1980 (53rd)	Altered States	Arthur Piantadosi, Les Fresholtz, Michael Minkler and Willie D. Burton
1980 (53rd)	Coal Miner's Daughter	Richard Portman, Roger Heman Jr. and James R. Alexander
1980 (53rd)	Fame	Michael J. Kohut, Aaron Rochin, Jay M. Harding and Christopher Newman
1980 (53rd)	Raging Bull	Donald O. Mitchell, Bill Nicholson, David J. Kimball and Les Lazarowitz
1981 (54th)	Best Sound	
1981 (54th)	Raiders of the Lost Ark	Bill Varney, Steve Maslow, Gregg Landaker and Roy Charman
1981 (54th)	On Golden Pond	Richard Portman and David M. Ronne
1981 (54th)	Outland	John Wilkinson, Robert W. Glass Jr., Robert Thirlwell and Robin Gregory
1981 (54th)	Pennies from Heaven	Michael J. Kohut, Jay M. Harding, Richard Tyler and Al Overton Jr.
1981 (54th)	Reds	Dick Vorisek, Tom Fleischman and Simon Kaye
1981 (54th)	Special Achievement Academy Award (Sound Effects Editing)	
1981 (54th)	Raiders of the Lost Ark	Ben Burtt and Richard L. Anderson
1982 (55th)	Best Sound	
1982 (55th)	E.T. the Extra-Terrestrial	Robert Knudson, Robert Glass, Don Digirolamo and Gene Cantamessa
1982 (55th)	Das Boot	Milan Bor, Trevor Pyke and Mike Le Mare
1982 (55th)	Gandhi	Gerry Humphreys, Robin O'Donoghue, Jonathan Bates and Simon Kaye
1982 (55th)	Tootsie	Arthur Piantadosi, Les Fresholtz, Dick Alexander and Les Lazarowitz
1982 (55th)	Tron	Michael Minkler, Bob Minkler, Lee Minkler and James LaRue
1982 (55th)	Best Sound Effects Editing	
1982 (55th)	E.T. the Extra-Terrestrial	Charles L. Campbell and Ben Burtt
1982 (55th)	Das Boot	Mike Le Mare
1982 (55th)	Poltergeist	Stephen Hunter Flick and Richard L. Anderson
1983 (56th)	Best Sound	
1983 (56th)	The Right Stuff	Randy Thom, Mark Berger, Tom Scott and David MacMillan
1983 (56th)	Never Cry Wolf	Randy Thom, David Parker, Todd Boekelheide and Alan Splet
1983 (56th)	Return of the Jedi	Ben Burtt, Randy Thom, Gary Summers and Tony Dawe
1983 (56th)	Terms of Endearment	Donald O. Mitchell, Rick Kline, Kevin O'Connell and James R. Alexander
1983 (56th)	WarGames	Michael J. Kohut, Carlos Delarios, Aaron Rochin and Willie D. Burton
1983 (56th)	Best Sound Effects Editing	
1983 (56th)	The Right Stuff	Jay Boekelheide
1983 (56th)	Return of the Jedi	Ben Burtt
1984 (57th)	Best Sound	
1984 (57th)	Amadeus	Mark Berger, Tom Scott, Todd Boekelheide and Christopher Newman
1984 (57th)	Dune	Bill Varney, Steve Maslow, Kevin O'Connell and Nelson Stoll
1984 (57th)	A Passage to India	Graham V. Hartstone, Nicolas Le Messurier, Michael A. Carter and John W. Mitchell
1984 (57th)	The River	Nick Alphin, Robert Thirlwell, Richard Portman and David M. Ronne
1984 (57th)	2010: The Year We Make Contact	Michael J. Kohut, Aaron Rochin, Carlos Delarios and Gene Cantamessa
1984 (57th)	Special Achievement Award (Sound Effects Editing)	
1984 (57th)	The River	Kay Rose
1985 (58th)	Best Sound	
1985 (58th)	Out of Africa	Chris Jenkins, Gary Alexander, Larry Stensvold and Peter Handford
1985 (58th)	Back to the Future	Bill Varney, B. Tennyson Sebastian II, Robert Thirlwell and William B. Kaplan
1985 (58th)	A Chorus Line	Donald O. Mitchell, Michael Minkler, Gerry Humphreys and Christopher Newman
1985 (58th)	Ladyhawke	Les Fresholtz, Dick Alexander, Vern Poore and Bud Alper
1985 (58th)	Silverado	Donald O. Mitchell, Rick Kline, Kevin O'Connell and David M. Ronne
1985 (58th)	Best Sound Effects Editing	
1985 (58th)	Back to the Future	Charles L. Campbell and Robert Rutledge
1985 (58th)	Ladyhawke	Robert G. Henderson and Alan Robert Murray
1985 (58th)	Rambo: First Blood Part II	Frederick Brown
1986 (59th)	Best Sound	
1986 (59th)	Platoon	John Wilkinson, Richard Rogers, Charles Grenzbach and Simon Kaye
1986 (59th)	Aliens	Graham V. Hartstone, Nicolas Le Messurier, Michael A. Carter and Roy Charman
1986 (59th)	Heartbreak Ridge	Les Fresholtz, Dick Alexander, Vern Poore and Bill Nelson
1986 (59th)	Star Trek IV: The Voyage Home	Terry Porter, David J. Hudson, Mel Metcalfe and Gene Cantamessa
1986 (59th)	Top Gun	Kevin O'Connell, Donald O. Mitchell, Rick Kline and William B. Kaplan
1986 (59th)	Best Sound Effects Editing	
1986 (59th)	Aliens	Don Sharpe
1986 (59th)	Star Trek IV: The Voyage Home	Mark Mangini
1986 (59th)	Top Gun	George Watters II and Cecelia Hall
1987 (60th)	Best Sound	
1987 (60th)	The Last Emperor	Bill Rowe and Ivan Sharrock
1987 (60th)	Empire of the Sun	Robert Knudson, Don Digirolamo, John Boyd and Tony Dawe
1987 (60th)	Lethal Weapon	Les Fresholtz, Dick Alexander, Vern Poore and Bill Nelson
1987 (60th)	RoboCop	Michael J. Kohut, Carlos Delarios, Aaron Rochin and Robert Wald
1987 (60th)	The Witches of Eastwick	Wayne Artman, Tom Beckert, Tom E. Dahl and Art Rochester
1987 (60th)	Special Achievement Academy Award (Sound Effects Editing)	
1987 (60th)	RoboCop	Stephen Hunter Flick and John Pospisil
1988 (61st)	Best Sound	
1988 (61st)	Bird	Les Fresholtz, Dick Alexander, Vern Poore and Willie D. Burton
1988 (61st)	Die Hard	Don J. Bassman, Kevin F. Cleary, Richard Overton and Al Overton Jr.
1988 (61st)	Gorillas in the Mist	Andy Nelson, Brian Saunders and Peter Handford
1988 (61st)	Mississippi Burning	Robert J. Litt, Elliot Tyson, Rick Kline and Danny Michael
1988 (61st)	Who Framed Roger Rabbit	Robert Knudson, John Boyd, Don Digirolamo and Tony Dawe
1988 (61st)	Best Sound Effects Editing	
1988 (61st)	Who Framed Roger Rabbit	Charles L. Campbell and Louis Edemann
1988 (61st)	Die Hard	Stephen Hunter Flick and Richard Shorr
1988 (61st)	Willow	Ben Burtt and Richard Hymns
1989 (62nd)	Best Sound	
1989 (62nd)	Glory	Donald O. Mitchell, Gregg Rudloff, Elliot Tyson and Russell Williams II
1989 (62nd)	The Abyss	Don J. Bassman, Kevin F. Cleary, Richard Overton and Lee Orloff
1989 (62nd)	Black Rain	Donald O. Mitchell, Kevin O'Connell, Greg P. Russell and Keith A. Wester
1989 (62nd)	Born on the Fourth of July	Michael Minkler, Gregory H. Watkins, Wylie Stateman and Tod A. Maitland
1989 (62nd)	Indiana Jones and the Last Crusade	Ben Burtt, Gary Summers, Shawn Murphy and Tony Dawe
1989 (62nd)	Best Sound Effects Editing	
1989 (62nd)	Indiana Jones and the Last Crusade	Ben Burtt and Richard Hymns
1989 (62nd)	Black Rain	Milton Burrow and William Manger
1989 (62nd)	Lethal Weapon 2	Robert G. Henderson and Alan Robert Murray

=== 1990s ===
Year	Film	Nominees
1990 (63rd)	Best Sound	
1990 (63rd)	Dances With Wolves	Jeffrey Perkins, Bill W. Benton, Gregory H. Watkins and Russell Williams II
1990 (63rd)	Days of Thunder	Kevin O'Connell, Donald O. Mitchell, Rick Kline and Charles M. Wilborn
1990 (63rd)	Dick Tracy	Chris Jenkins, David E. Campbell, Doug Hemphill and Thomas Causey
1990 (63rd)	The Hunt for Red October	Don J. Bassman, Richard Overton, Kevin F. Cleary and Richard Bryce Goodman
1990 (63rd)	Total Recall	Michael J. Kohut, Carlos Delarios, Aaron Rochin and Nelson Stoll
1990 (63rd)	Best Sound Effects Editing	
1990 (63rd)	The Hunt for Red October	George Watters II and Cecelia Hall
1990 (63rd)	Flatliners	Charles L. Campbell and Richard C. Franklin
1990 (63rd)	Total Recall	Stephen Hunter Flick
1991 (64th)	Best Sound	
1991 (64th)	Terminator 2: Judgment Day	Gary Rydstrom, Tom Johnson, Gary Summers and Lee Orloff
1991 (64th)	Backdraft	Gary Rydstrom, Randy Thom, Gary Summers and Glenn Williams
1991 (64th)	Beauty and the Beast	Terry Porter, Mel Metcalfe, David J. Hudson and Doc Kane
1991 (64th)	JFK	Michael Minkler, Gregg Landaker and Tod A. Maitland
1991 (64th)	The Silence of the Lambs	Tom Fleischman and Christopher Newman
1991 (64th)	Best Sound Effects Editing	
1991 (64th)	Terminator 2: Judgment Day	Gary Rydstrom and Gloria S. Borders
1991 (64th)	Backdraft	Gary Rydstrom and Richard Hymns
1991 (64th)	Star Trek VI: The Undiscovered Country	George Watters II and F. Hudson Miller
1992 (65th)	Best Sound	
1992 (65th)	The Last of the Mohicans	Chris Jenkins, Doug Hemphill, Mark Smith and Simon Kaye
1992 (65th)	Aladdin	Terry Porter, Mel Metcalfe, David J. Hudson and Doc Kane
1992 (65th)	A Few Good Men	Kevin O'Connell, Rick Kline and Robert Eber
1992 (65th)	Under Siege	Donald O. Mitchell, Frank A. Montaño, Rick Hart and Scott D. Smith
1992 (65th)	Unforgiven	Les Fresholtz, Vern Poore, Dick Alexander and Rob Young
1992 (65th)	Best Sound Effects Editing	
1992 (65th)	Bram Stoker's Dracula	Tom McCarthy and David E. Stone
1992 (65th)	Aladdin	Mark Mangini
1992 (65th)	Under Siege	John Leveque and Bruce Stambler
1993 (66th)	Best Sound	
1993 (66th)	Jurassic Park	Gary Rydstrom, Gary Summers, Shawn Murphy and Ron Judkins
1993 (66th)	Cliffhanger	Michael Minkler, Bob Beemer and Tim Cooney
1993 (66th)	The Fugitive	Donald O. Mitchell, Michael Herbick, Frank A. Montaño and Scott D. Smith
1993 (66th)	Geronimo: An American Legend	Chris Carpenter, Doug Hemphill, Bill W. Benton and Lee Orloff
1993 (66th)	Schindler's List	Andy Nelson, Scott Millan, Steve Pederson and Ron Judkins
1993 (66th)	Best Sound Effects Editing	
1993 (66th)	Jurassic Park	Gary Rydstrom and Richard Hymns
1993 (66th)	Cliffhanger	Wylie Stateman and Gregg Baxter
1993 (66th)	The Fugitive	John Leveque and Bruce Stambler
1994 (67th)	Best Sound	
1994 (67th)	Speed	Gregg Landaker, Steve Maslow, Bob Beemer and David MacMillan
1994 (67th)	Clear and Present Danger	Donald O. Mitchell, Michael Herbick, Frank A. Montaño and Art Rochester
1994 (67th)	Forrest Gump	Randy Thom, Tom Johnson, Dennis S. Sands and William B. Kaplan
1994 (67th)	Legends of the Fall	Paul Massey, David E. Campbell, Chris David and Douglas Ganton
1994 (67th)	The Shawshank Redemption	Robert J. Litt, Elliot Tyson, Michael Herbick and Willie D. Burton
1994 (67th)	Best Sound Effects Editing	
1994 (67th)	Speed	Stephen Hunter Flick
1994 (67th)	Clear and Present Danger	Bruce Stambler and John Leveque
1994 (67th)	Forrest Gump	Randy Thom and Gloria S. Borders
1995 (68th)	Best Sound	
1995 (68th)	Apollo 13	Rick Dior, Steve Pederson, Scott Millan and David MacMillan
1995 (68th)	Batman Forever	Donald O. Mitchell, Frank A. Montaño, Michael Herbick and Petur Hliddal
1995 (68th)	Braveheart	Andy Nelson, Scott Millan, Anna Behlmer and Brian Simmons
1995 (68th)	Crimson Tide	Kevin O'Connell, Rick Kline, Gregory H. Watkins and William B. Kaplan
1995 (68th)	Waterworld	Steve Maslow, Gregg Landaker and Keith A. Wester
1995 (68th)	Best Sound Effects Editing	
1995 (68th)	Braveheart	Lon Bender and Per Hallberg
1995 (68th)	Batman Forever	John Leveque and Bruce Stambler
1995 (68th)	Crimson Tide	George Watters II
1996 (69th)	Best Sound	
1996 (69th)	The English Patient	Walter Murch, Mark Berger, David Parker and Christopher Newman
1996 (69th)	Evita	Andy Nelson, Anna Behlmer and Ken Weston
1996 (69th)	Independence Day	Chris Carpenter, Bill W. Benton, Bob Beemer and Jeff Wexler
1996 (69th)	The Rock	Kevin O'Connell, Greg P. Russell and Keith A. Wester
1996 (69th)	Twister	Kevin O'Connell, Gregg Landaker, Steve Maslow and Geoffrey Patterson
1996 (69th)	Best Sound Effects Editing	
1996 (69th)	The Ghost and the Darkness	Bruce Stambler
1996 (69th)	Daylight	Richard L. Anderson and David A. Whittaker
1996 (69th)	Eraser	Alan Robert Murray and Bub Asman
1997 (70th)	Best Sound	
1997 (70th)	Titanic	Gary Rydstrom, Tom Johnson, Gary Summers and Mark Ulano
1997 (70th)	Air Force One	Paul Massey, Rick Kline, Doug Hemphill and Keith A. Wester
1997 (70th)	Con Air	Kevin O'Connell, Greg P. Russell and Art Rochester
1997 (70th)	Contact	Randy Thom, Tom Johnson, Dennis S. Sands and William B. Kaplan
1997 (70th)	L.A. Confidential	Andy Nelson, Anna Behlmer and Kirk Francis
1997 (70th)	Best Sound Effects Editing	
1997 (70th)	Titanic	Christopher Boyes and Tom Bellfort
1997 (70th)	Face/Off	Mark P. Stoeckinger and Per Hallberg
1997 (70th)	The Fifth Element	Mark Mangini
1998 (71st)	Best Sound	
1998 (71st)	Saving Private Ryan	Gary Rydstrom, Gary Summers, Andy Nelson and Ron Judkins
1998 (71st)	Armageddon	Kevin O'Connell, Greg P. Russell and Keith A. Wester
1998 (71st)	The Mask of Zorro	Kevin O'Connell, Greg P. Russell and Pud Cusack
1998 (71st)	Shakespeare in Love	Robin O'Donoghue, Dominic Lester and Peter Glossop
1998 (71st)	The Thin Red Line	Andy Nelson, Anna Behlmer and Paul Brincat
1998 (71st)	Best Sound Effects Editing	
1998 (71st)	Saving Private Ryan	Gary Rydstrom and Richard Hymns
1998 (71st)	Armageddon	George Watters II
1998 (71st)	The Mask of Zorro	Dave McMoyler
1999 (72nd)	Best Sound	
1999 (72nd)	The Matrix	John T. Reitz, Gregg Rudloff, David E. Campbell and David Lee
1999 (72nd)	The Green Mile	Robert J. Litt, Elliot Tyson, Michael Herbick and Willie D. Burton
1999 (72nd)	The Insider	Andy Nelson, Doug Hemphill and Lee Orloff
1999 (72nd)	The Mummy	Leslie Shatz, Chris Carpenter, Rick Kline and Chris Munro
1999 (72nd)	Star Wars: Episode I – The Phantom Menace	Gary Rydstrom, Tom Johnson, Shawn Murphy and John Midgley
1999 (72nd)	Best Sound Effects Editing	
1999 (72nd)	The Matrix	Dane A. Davis
1999 (72nd)	Fight Club	Ren Klyce and Richard Hymns
1999 (72nd)	Star Wars: Episode I – The Phantom Menace	Ben Burtt and Tom Bellfort

=== 2000s ===
Year	Film	Nominees
2000 (73rd)	Best Sound	
2000 (73rd)	Gladiator	Scott Millan, Bob Beemer and Ken Weston
2000 (73rd)	Cast Away	Randy Thom, Tom Johnson, Dennis S. Sands and William B. Kaplan
2000 (73rd)	The Patriot	Kevin O'Connell, Greg P. Russell and Lee Orloff
2000 (73rd)	The Perfect Storm	John T. Reitz, Gregg Rudloff, David E. Campbell and Keith A. Wester
2000 (73rd)	U-571	Steve Maslow, Gregg Landaker, Rick Kline and Ivan Sharrock
2000 (73rd)	Best Sound Editing	
2000 (73rd)	U-571	Jon Johnson
2000 (73rd)	Space Cowboys	Bub Asman and Alan Robert Murray
2001 (74th)	Best Sound	
2001 (74th)	Black Hawk Down	Michael Minkler, Myron Nettinga and Chris Munro
2001 (74th)	Amélie	Vincent Arnardi, Guillaume Leriche and Jean Umansky
2001 (74th)	The Lord of the Rings: The Fellowship of the Ring	Christopher Boyes, Michael Semanick, Gethin Creagh and Hammond Peek
2001 (74th)	Moulin Rouge!	Andy Nelson, Anna Behlmer, Roger Savage and Guntis Sics
2001 (74th)	Pearl Harbor	Kevin O'Connell, Greg P. Russell and Peter J. Devlin
2001 (74th)	Best Sound Editing	
2001 (74th)	Pearl Harbor	George Watters II and Christopher Boyes
2001 (74th)	Monsters, Inc.	Gary Rydstrom and Michael Silvers
2002 (75th)	Best Sound	
2002 (75th)	Chicago	Michael Minkler, Dominick Tavella and David Lee
2002 (75th)	Gangs of New York	Tom Fleischman, Eugene Gearty and Ivan Sharrock
2002 (75th)	The Lord of the Rings: The Two Towers	Christopher Boyes, Michael Semanick, Michael Hedges and Hammond Peek
2002 (75th)	Road to Perdition	Scott Millan, Bob Beemer and John Pritchett
2002 (75th)	Spider-Man	Kevin O'Connell, Greg P. Russell and Ed Novick
2002 (75th)	Best Sound Editing	
2002 (75th)	The Lord of the Rings: The Two Towers	Ethan Van der Ryn and Mike Hopkins
2002 (75th)	Minority Report	Gary Rydstrom and Richard Hymns
2002 (75th)	Road to Perdition	Scott A. Hecker
2003 (76th)	Best Sound Mixing	
2003 (76th)	The Lord of the Rings: The Return of the King	Christopher Boyes, Michael Semanick, Michael Hedges and Hammond Peek
2003 (76th)	The Last Samurai	Andy Nelson, Anna Behlmer and Jeff Wexler
2003 (76th)	Master and Commander: The Far Side of the World	Paul Massey, Doug Hemphill and Art Rochester
2003 (76th)	Pirates of the Caribbean: The Curse of the Black Pearl	Christopher Boyes, David Parker, David E. Campbell and Lee Orloff
2003 (76th)	Seabiscuit	Andy Nelson, Anna Behlmer and Tod A. Maitland
2003 (76th)	Best Sound Editing	
2003 (76th)	Master and Commander: The Far Side of the World	Richard King
2003 (76th)	Finding Nemo	Gary Rydstrom and Michael Silvers
2003 (76th)	Pirates of the Caribbean: The Curse of the Black Pearl	Christopher Boyes and George Watters II
2004 (77th)	Best Sound Mixing	
2004 (77th)	Ray	Scott Millan, Greg Orloff, Bob Beemer and Steve Cantamessa
2004 (77th)	The Aviator	Tom Fleischman and Petur Hliddal
2004 (77th)	The Incredibles	Randy Thom, Gary A. Rizzo and Doc Kane
2004 (77th)	The Polar Express	Randy Thom, Tom Johnson, Dennis S. Sands and William B. Kaplan
2004 (77th)	Spider-Man 2	Kevin O'Connell, Greg P. Russell, Jeffrey J. Haboush and Joseph Geisinger
2004 (77th)	Best Sound Editing	
2004 (77th)	The Incredibles	Randy Thom and Michael Silvers
2004 (77th)	The Polar Express	Randy Thom and Dennis Leonard
2004 (77th)	Spider-Man 2	Paul N. J. Ottosson
2005 (78th)	Best Sound Mixing	
2005 (78th)	King Kong	Christopher Boyes, Michael Semanick, Michael Hedges and Hammond Peek
2005 (78th)	The Chronicles of Narnia: The Lion, the Witch and the Wardrobe	Terry Porter, Dean A. Zupancic and Tony Johnson
2005 (78th)	Memoirs of a Geisha	Kevin O'Connell, Greg P. Russell, Rick Kline and John Pritchett
2005 (78th)	Walk the Line	Paul Massey, Doug Hemphill and Peter Kurland
2005 (78th)	War of the Worlds	Andy Nelson, Anna Behlmer and Ron Judkins
2005 (78th)	Best Sound Editing	
2005 (78th)	King Kong	Mike Hopkins and Ethan Van der Ryn
2005 (78th)	Memoirs of a Geisha	Wylie Stateman
2005 (78th)	War of the Worlds	Richard King
2006 (79th)	Best Sound Mixing	
2006 (79th)	Dreamgirls	Michael Minkler, Bob Beemer and Willie D. Burton
2006 (79th)	Apocalypto	Kevin O'Connell, Greg P. Russell and Fernando Cámara
2006 (79th)	Blood Diamond	Andy Nelson, Anna Behlmer and Ivan Sharrock
2006 (79th)	Flags of Our Fathers	John T. Reitz, David E. Campbell, Gregg Rudloff and Walt Martin
2006 (79th)	Pirates of the Caribbean: Dead Man's Chest	Christopher Boyes, Paul Massey and Lee Orloff
2006 (79th)	Best Sound Editing	
2006 (79th)	Letters from Iwo Jima	Alan Robert Murray and Bub Asman
2006 (79th)	Apocalypto	Sean McCormack and Kami Asgar
2006 (79th)	Blood Diamond	Lon Bender
2006 (79th)	Flags of Our Fathers	Alan Robert Murray and Bub Asman
2006 (79th)	Pirates of the Caribbean: Dead Man's Chest	Christopher Boyes and George Watters II
2007 (80th)	Best Sound Mixing	
2007 (80th)	The Bourne Ultimatum	Scott Millan, David Parker and Kirk Francis
2007 (80th)	No Country for Old Men	Skip Lievsay, Craig Berkey, Greg Orloff and Peter Kurland
2007 (80th)	Ratatouille	Randy Thom, Michael Semanick and Doc Kane
2007 (80th)	3:10 to Yuma	Paul Massey, David Giammarco and Jim Stuebe
2007 (80th)	Transformers	Kevin O'Connell, Greg P. Russell and Peter J. Devlin
2007 (80th)	Best Sound Editing	
2007 (80th)	The Bourne Ultimatum	Karen Baker Landers and Per Hallberg
2007 (80th)	No Country for Old Men	Skip Lievsay
2007 (80th)	Ratatouille	Randy Thom and Michael Silvers
2007 (80th)	There Will Be Blood	Christopher Scarabosio and Matthew Wood
2007 (80th)	Transformers	Ethan Van der Ryn and Mike Hopkins
2008 (81st)	Best Sound Mixing	
2008 (81st)	Slumdog Millionaire	Ian Tapp, Richard Pryke and Resul Pookutty
2008 (81st)	The Curious Case of Benjamin Button	Ren Klyce, Michael Semanick, David Parker and Mark Weingarten
2008 (81st)	The Dark Knight	Lora Hirschberg, Gary A. Rizzo and Ed Novick
2008 (81st)	WALL-E	Tom Myers, Michael Semanick and Ben Burtt
2008 (81st)	Wanted	Chris Jenkins, Frank A. Montaño and Petr Forejt
2008 (81st)	Best Sound Editing	
2008 (81st)	The Dark Knight	Richard King
2008 (81st)	Iron Man	Christopher Boyes and Frank E. Eulner
2008 (81st)	Slumdog Millionaire	Glenn Freemantle and Tom Sayers
2008 (81st)	WALL-E	Ben Burtt and Matthew Wood
2008 (81st)	Wanted	Wylie Stateman
2009 (82nd)	Best Sound Mixing	
2009 (82nd)	The Hurt Locker	Paul N. J. Ottosson and Ray Beckett
2009 (82nd)	Avatar	Christopher Boyes, Gary Summers, Andy Nelson and Tony Johnson
2009 (82nd)	Inglourious Basterds	Michael Minkler, Tony Lamberti and Mark Ulano
2009 (82nd)	Star Trek	Andy Nelson, Anna Behlmer and Peter J. Devlin
2009 (82nd)	Transformers: Revenge of the Fallen	Greg P. Russell, Gary Summers and Geoffrey Patterson
2009 (82nd)	Best Sound Editing	
2009 (82nd)	The Hurt Locker	Paul N. J. Ottosson
2009 (82nd)	Avatar	Christopher Boyes and Gwendolyn Yates Whittle
2009 (82nd)	Inglourious Basterds	Wylie Stateman
2009 (82nd)	Star Trek	Mark P. Stoeckinger and Alan Rankin
2009 (82nd)	Up	Tom Myers and Michael Silvers

=== 2010s ===
Year	Film	Nominees
2010 (83rd)	Best Sound Mixing	
2010 (83rd)	Inception	Lora Hirschberg, Gary A. Rizzo and Ed Novick
2010 (83rd)	The King's Speech	Paul Hamblin, Martin Jensen and John Midgley
2010 (83rd)	Salt	Jeffrey J. Haboush, Greg P. Russell, Scott Millan and William Sarokin
2010 (83rd)	The Social Network	Ren Klyce, Michael Semanick, David Parker and Mark Weingarten
2010 (83rd)	True Grit	Skip Lievsay, Craig Berkey, Greg Orloff and Peter Kurland
2010 (83rd)	Best Sound Editing	
2010 (83rd)	Inception	Richard King
2010 (83rd)	Toy Story 3	Tom Myers and Michael Silvers
2010 (83rd)	Tron: Legacy	Gwendolyn Yates Whittle and Addison Teague
2010 (83rd)	True Grit	Skip Lievsay and Craig Berkey
2010 (83rd)	Unstoppable	Mark P. Stoeckinger
2011 (84th)	Best Sound Mixing	
2011 (84th)	Hugo	Tom Fleischman and John Midgley
2011 (84th)	The Girl with the Dragon Tattoo	Ren Klyce, Michael Semanick, David Parker and Bo Persson
2011 (84th)	Moneyball	Deb Adair, Ron Bochar, Dave Giammarco and Ed Novick
2011 (84th)	Transformers: Dark of the Moon	Greg P. Russell, Gary Summers, Jeffrey J. Haboush and Peter J. Devlin
2011 (84th)	War Horse	Gary Rydstrom, Tom Johnson, Andy Nelson and Stuart Willson
2011 (84th)	Best Sound Editing	
2011 (84th)	Hugo	Philip Stockton and Eugene Gearty
2011 (84th)	Drive	Lon Bender and Victor Ray Ennis
2011 (84th)	The Girl with the Dragon Tattoo	Ren Klyce
2011 (84th)	Transformers: Dark of the Moon	Ethan Van der Ryn and Erik Aadahl
2011 (84th)	War Horse	Gary Rydstrom and Richard Hymns
2012 (85th)	Best Sound Mixing	
2012 (85th)	Les Misérables	Andy Nelson, Mark Paterson and Simon Hayes
2012 (85th)	Argo	John T. Reitz, Gregg Rudloff and Jose Antonio García
2012 (85th)	Lincoln	Gary Rydstrom, Andy Nelson and Ron Judkins
2012 (85th)	Life of Pi	Ron Bartlett, Doug Hemphill and Drew Kunin
2012 (85th)	Skyfall	Scott Millan, Greg P. Russell and Stuart Wilson
2012 (85th)	Best Sound Editing (Note: A tie in voting resulted in two winners.)	
2012 (85th)	Skyfall (TIE)	Per Hallberg and Karen Baker Landers
2012 (85th)	Zero Dark Thirty (TIE)	Paul N. J. Ottosson
2012 (85th)	Argo	Erik Aadahl and Ethan Van der Ryn
2012 (85th)	Django Unchained	Wylie Stateman
2012 (85th)	Life of Pi	Eugene Gearty and Philip Stockton
2013 (86th)	Best Sound Mixing	
2013 (86th)	Gravity	Skip Lievsay, Niv Adiri, Christopher Benstead and Chris Munro
2013 (86th)	Captain Phillips	Chris Burdon, Mark Taylor, Mike Prestwood Smith and Chris Munro
2013 (86th)	The Hobbit: The Desolation of Smaug	Christopher Boyes, Michael Semanick, Michael Hedges and Tony Johnson
2013 (86th)	Inside Llewyn Davis	Skip Lievsay, Greg Orloff and Peter Kurland
2013 (86th)	Lone Survivor	Andy Koyama, Beau Borders and David Brownlow
2013 (86th)	Best Sound Editing	
2013 (86th)	Gravity	Glenn Freemantle
2013 (86th)	All Is Lost	Steve Boeddeker and Richard Hymns
2013 (86th)	Captain Phillips	Oliver Tarney
2013 (86th)	The Hobbit: The Desolation of Smaug	Brent Burge and Chris Ward
2013 (86th)	Lone Survivor	Wylie Stateman
2014 (87th)	Best Sound Mixing	
2014 (87th)	Whiplash	Craig Mann, Ben Wilkins and Thomas Curley
2014 (87th)	American Sniper	John T. Reitz, Gregg Rudloff and Walt Martin (posthumously)
2014 (87th)	Birdman or (The Unexpected Virtue of Ignorance)	Jon Taylor, Frank A. Montaño and Thomas Varga
2014 (87th)	Interstellar	Gary A. Rizzo, Gregg Landaker and Mark Weingarten
2014 (87th)	Unbroken	Jon Taylor, Frank A. Montaño and David Lee
2014 (87th)	Best Sound Editing	
2014 (87th)	American Sniper	Alan Robert Murray and Bub Asman
2014 (87th)	Birdman or (The Unexpected Virtue of Ignorance)	Martin Hernández and Aaron Glascock
2014 (87th)	The Hobbit: The Battle of the Five Armies	Brent Burge and Jason Canovas
2014 (87th)	Interstellar	Richard King
2014 (87th)	Unbroken	Becky Sullivan and Andrew DeCristofaro
2015 (88th)	Best Sound Mixing	
2015 (88th)	Mad Max: Fury Road	Chris Jenkins, Gregg Rudloff and Ben Osmo
2015 (88th)	Bridge of Spies	Gary Rydstrom, Andy Nelson and Drew Kunin
2015 (88th)	The Martian	Paul Massey, Mark Taylor and Mac Ruth
2015 (88th)	The Revenant	Randy Thom, Jon Taylor, Frank A. Montaño and Chris Duesterdiek
2015 (88th)	Star Wars: The Force Awakens	Christopher Scarabosio, Andy Nelson and Stuart Wilson
2015 (88th)	Best Sound Editing	
2015 (88th)	Mad Max: Fury Road	Mark Mangini and David White
2015 (88th)	The Martian	Oliver Tarney
2015 (88th)	The Revenant	Lon Bender and Martin Hernández
2015 (88th)	Sicario	Alan Robert Murray
2015 (88th)	Star Wars: The Force Awakens	David Acord and Matthew Wood
2016 (89th)	Best Sound Mixing	
2016 (89th)	Hacksaw Ridge	Kevin O'Connell, Andy Wright, Robert Mackenzie and Peter Grace
2016 (89th)	Arrival	Bernard Gariépy Strobl and Claude La Haye
2016 (89th)	La La Land	Andy Nelson, Ai-Ling Lee and Steven A. Morrow
2016 (89th)	Rogue One: A Star Wars Story	Christopher Scarabosio, David Parker and Stuart Wilson
2016 (89th)	13 Hours: The Secret Soldiers of Benghazi	Gary Summers, Jeffrey J. Haboush and Mac Ruth
2016 (89th)	Best Sound Editing	
2016 (89th)	Arrival	Sylvain Bellemare
2016 (89th)	Deepwater Horizon	Wylie Stateman and Renée Tondelli
2016 (89th)	Hacksaw Ridge	Robert Mackenzie and Andy Wright
2016 (89th)	La La Land	Ai-Ling Lee and Mildred Iatrou Morgan
2016 (89th)	Sully	Alan Robert Murray and Bub Asman
2017 (90th)	Best Sound Mixing	
2017 (90th)	Dunkirk	Gregg Landaker, Gary A. Rizzo and Mark Weingarten
2017 (90th)	Baby Driver	Julian Slater, Tim Cavagin and Mary H. Ellis
2017 (90th)	Blade Runner 2049	Ron Bartlett, Doug Hemphill and Mac Ruth
2017 (90th)	The Shape of Water	Christian Cooke, Brad Zoern and Glen Gauthier
2017 (90th)	Star Wars: The Last Jedi	David Parker, Michael Semanick, Ren Klyce and Stuart Wilson
2017 (90th)	Best Sound Editing	
2017 (90th)	Dunkirk	Richard King and Alex Gibson
2017 (90th)	Baby Driver	Julian Slater
2017 (90th)	Blade Runner 2049	Mark Mangini and Theo Green
2017 (90th)	The Shape of Water	Nathan Robitaille and Nelson Ferreira
2017 (90th)	Star Wars: The Last Jedi	Ren Klyce and Matthew Wood
2018 (91st)	Best Sound Mixing	
2018 (91st)	Bohemian Rhapsody	Paul Massey, Tim Cavagin and John Casali
2018 (91st)	Black Panther	Steve Boeddeker, Brandon Proctor and Peter J. Devlin
2018 (91st)	First Man	Jon Taylor, Frank A. Montaño, Ai-Ling Lee and Mary H. Ellis
2018 (91st)	Roma	Skip Lievsay, Craig Henighan and José Antonio García
2018 (91st)	A Star Is Born	Tom Ozanich, Dean Zupancic, Jason Ruder and Steven A. Morrow
2018 (91st)	Best Sound Editing	
2018 (91st)	Bohemian Rhapsody	John Warhurst and Nina Hartstone
2018 (91st)	Black Panther	Steve Boeddeker and Benjamin A. Burtt
2018 (91st)	First Man	Ai-Ling Lee and Mildred Iatrou Morgan
2018 (91st)	A Quiet Place	Ethan Van der Ryn and Erik Aadahl
2018 (91st)	Roma	Skip Lievsay and Sergio Díaz
2019 (92nd)	Best Sound Mixing	
2019 (92nd)	1917	Mark Taylor and Stuart Wilson
2019 (92nd)	Ad Astra	Gary Rydstrom, Tom Johnson and Mark Ulano
2019 (92nd)	Ford v Ferrari	Paul Massey, David Giammarco and Steven A. Morrow
2019 (92nd)	Joker	Tom Ozanich, Dean Zupancic and Tod A. Maitland
2019 (92nd)	Once Upon a Time in Hollywood	Michael Minkler, Christian P. Minkler and Mark Ulano
2019 (92nd)	Best Sound Editing	
2019 (92nd)	Ford v Ferrari	Donald Sylvester
2019 (92nd)	Joker	Alan Robert Murray
2019 (92nd)	1917	Oliver Tarney and Rachael Tate
2019 (92nd)	Once Upon a Time in Hollywood	Wylie Stateman
2019 (92nd)	Star Wars: The Rise of Skywalker	David Acord and Matthew Wood

=== 2020s ===
Year	Film	Nominees
2020/21 (93rd)	Sound of Metal	Nicolas Becker, Jaime Baksht, Michelle Couttolenc, Carlos Cortés Navarrete and Phillip Bladh
2020/21 (93rd)	Greyhound	Warren Shaw, Michael Minkler, Beau Borders and David Wyman
2020/21 (93rd)	Mank	Ren Klyce, Jeremy Molod, David Parker, Nathan Nance and Drew Kunin
2020/21 (93rd)	News of the World	Oliver Tarney, Mike Prestwood Smith, William Miller and John Pritchett
2020/21 (93rd)	Soul	Ren Klyce, Coya Elliott and David Parker
2021 (94th)	Dune	Mac Ruth, Mark Mangini, Theo Green, Doug Hemphill and Ron Bartlett
2021 (94th)	Belfast	Denise Yarde, Simon Chase, James Mather and Niv Adiri
2021 (94th)	No Time to Die	Simon Hayes, Oliver Tarney, James Harrison, Paul Massey and Mark Taylor
2021 (94th)	The Power of the Dog	Richard Flynn, Robert Mackenzie and Tara Webb
2021 (94th)	West Side Story	Tod A. Maitland, Gary Rydstrom, Brian Chumney, Andy Nelson and Shawn Murphy
2022 (95th)	Top Gun: Maverick	Mark Weingarten, James H. Mather, Al Nelson, Chris Burdon and Mark Taylor
2022 (95th)	All Quiet on the Western Front	Viktor Prášil, Frank Kruse, Markus Stemler, Lars Ginzel and Stefan Korte
2022 (95th)	Avatar: The Way of Water	Julian Howarth, Gwendolyn Yates Whittle, Dick Bernstein, Christopher Boyes, Gary Summers and Michael Hedges
2022 (95th)	The Batman	Stuart Wilson, William Files, Douglas Murray and Andy Nelson
2022 (95th)	Elvis	David Lee, Wayne Pashley, Andy Nelson and Michael Keller
2023 (96th)	The Zone of Interest	Tarn Willers and Johnnie Burn
2023 (96th)	The Creator	Ian Voigt, Erik Aadahl, Ethan Van der Ryn, Tom Ozanich and Dean Zupancic
2023 (96th)	Maestro	Steven A. Morrow, Richard King, Jason Ruder, Tom Ozanich and Dean Zupancic
2023 (96th)	Mission: Impossible – Dead Reckoning Part One	Chris Munro, James H. Mather, Chris Burdon and Mark Taylor
2023 (96th)	Oppenheimer	Willie D. Burton, Richard King, Gary A. Rizzo and Kevin O'Connell
2024 (97th)	Dune: Part Two	Gareth John, Richard King, Ron Bartlett and Doug Hemphill
2024 (97th)	A Complete Unknown	Tod A. Maitland, Donald Sylvester, Ted Caplan, Paul Massey and David Giammarco
2024 (97th)	Emilia Pérez	Erwan Kerzanet, Aymeric Devoldère, Maxence Dussère, Cyril Holtz and Niels Barletta
2024 (97th)	Wicked	Simon Hayes, Nancy Nugent Title, Jack Dolman, Andy Nelson and John Marquis
2024 (97th)	The Wild Robot	Randy Thom, Brian Chumney, Gary A. Rizzo and Leff Lefferts
2025 (98th)	F1	Gareth John, Al Nelson, Gwendolyn Yates Whittle, Gary A. Rizzo and Juan Peralta
2025 (98th)	Frankenstein	Greg Chapman, Nathan Robitaille, Nelson Ferreira, Christian Cooke and Brad Zoern
2025 (98th)	One Battle After Another	José Antonio García, Christopher Scarabosio and Tony Villaflor
2025 (98th)	Sinners	Chris Welcker, Benjamin A. Burtt, Felipe Pacheco, Brandon Proctor and Steve Boeddeker
2025 (98th)	Sirāt	Amanda Villavieja, Laia Casanovas and Yasmina Praderas

== Multiple nominations and awards for Best Sound Mixing ==
Awards	Nominations	Recipient
5	16	Thomas T. Moulton
5	15	Douglas Shearer
5	7	Fred Hynes
4	12	Gary Summers
4	10	Gary Rydstrom
4	9	Gregg Landaker
4	9	Scott Millan
4	7	Bob Beemer
4	4	Mark Berger
3	17	John P. Livadary
3	16	Gordon E. Sawyer
3	12	Michael Minkler
3	10	Robert Knudson
3	8	Gary A. Rizzo
3	7	Gregg Rudloff
3	7	Steve Maslow
3	6	Franklin Milton
3	5	Chris Jenkins
3	5	Christopher Newman
3	3	David MacMillan
2	24	Andy Nelson
2	12	Les Fresholtz
2	11	Michael Semanick
2	9	David Parker
2	9	Tom Johnson
2	8	Christopher Boyes
2	8	Dick Alexander
2	8	George Groves
2	7	Willie D. Burton
2	4	Bill Varney
2	4	Chris Munro
2	4	Hammond Peek
2	4	Michael Hedges
2	4	Ron Judkins
2	4	Simon Kaye
2	4	Stephen Dunn
2	3	David Lee
2	3	Walter Murch
2	2	David Hildyard
2	2	Russell Williams II
2	2	Tom Scott
1	21	Kevin O'Connell
1	17	Nathan Levinson
1	14	Donald O. Mitchell
1	12	Randy Thom
1	11	Edmund H. Hansen
1	11	Richard Portman
1	9	Aaron Rochin
1	9	Paul Massey
1	8	Bernard B. Brown
1	8	Doug Hemphill
1	7	Arthur Piantadosi
1	7	Gene Cantamessa
1	7	Jack Whitney
1	7	Lee Orloff
1	6	David E. Campbell
1	6	Jack Solomon
1	6	John T. Reitz
1	6	Leslie I. Carey
1	6	Robert Glass
1	6	Stuart Wilson
1	5	Don MacDougall
1	5	Franklin B. Hansen
1	5	Skip Lievsay
1	5	Tom Fleischman
1	5	Vern Poore
1	5	William McCaughey
1	4	Carlton W. Faulkner
1	4	Douglas Williams
1	4	Ed Novick
1	4	Elliot Tyson
1	4	Gordon McCallum
1	4	Greg Orloff
1	4	Ivan Sharrock
1	4	James Corcoran
1	4	Mark Ulano
1	4	Mark Weingarten
1	4	Roy Charman
1	3	Bill W. Benton
1	3	Charles Grenzbach
1	3	Don Digirolamo
1	3	Gregory H. Watkins
1	3	John Cox
1	3	John Midgley
1	3	John Wilkinson
1	3	Mark Taylor
1	3	Ronald Pierce
1	3	Shawn Murphy
1	2	Bob Minkler
1	2	Jim Webb
1	2	Ken Weston
1	2	Kirk Francis
1	2	Lora Hirschberg
1	2	Murray Spivack
1	2	Peter Handford
1	2	Roger Herman Jr.
1	2	Steve Pederson
1	2	Tim Cavagin
1	2	Todd Boekelheide

Nominations	Recipient
16	Greg P. Russell
12	Loren L. Ryder
11	Rick Kline
10	Anna Behlmer
9	Frank A. Montaño
9	John Aalberg
7	Daniel J. Bloomberg
7	Michael J. Kohut
7	William B. Kaplan
6	Elmer A. Raguse
6	Keith A. Wester
6	Waldon O. Watson
5	Art Rochester
5	Michael Herbick
5	Peter J. Devlin
5	Theodore Soderberg
4	A. W. Watkins
4	Al Overton Jr.
4	Carlos Delarios
4	Charles L. Lootens
4	Dennis S. Sands
4	Doc Kane
4	Jeffrey J. Haboush
4	Peter Kurland
4	Ren Klyce
4	Richard Tyler
4	Sam Slyfield
4	Terry Porter
4	Tod A. Maitland
4	Tony Dawe
3	Ben Burtt
3	Chris Carpenter
3	Christopher Newman
3	David J. Hudson
3	David M. Ronne
3	Dean Zupancic
3	Don J. Bassman
3	Graham V. Hartstone
3	Gregory H. Watkins
3	Harry W. Tetrick
3	Herman Lewis
3	James L. Fields
3	John Pritchett
3	Jon Taylor
3	Kevin F. Cleary
3	Larry Jost
3	Mac Ruth
3	Mel Metcalfe
3	Nicolas Le Messurier
3	Richard Overton
3	Robert J. Litt
3	Robert O. Cook
3	Robert Thirlwell
3	Steven A. Morrow
3	Tony Johnson
3	Wesley C. Miller
2	Ai-Ling Lee
2	Bill Nelson
2	Brian Chumney
2	Bud Alper
2	Carl Dreher
2	Christopher Scarabosio
2	Craig Berkey
2	Curly Thirlwell
2	David Giammarco
2	Drew Kunin
2	Geoffrey Patterson
2	George Dutton
2	Gerry Humphreys
2	Homer G. Tasker
2	James R. Alexander
2	Jay M. Harding
2	Jeff Wexler
2	John Aldred
2	John Boyd
2	John W. Mitchell
2	Jose Antonio Garcia
2	Les Lazarowitz
2	Mary H. Ellis
2	Michael A. Carter
2	Nelson Stoll
2	Paul Wells
2	Petur Hliddal
2	Robert W. Glass Jr.
2	Robin Gregory
2	Robin O'Donoghue
2	Ron Bartlett
2	Scott D. Smith
2	Tom Beckert
2	Tom Ozanich
2	Walt Martin
2	William A. Mueller

== Multiple awards and nominations for Best Sound Editing ==
=== Multiple awards ===
5 awards

- Richard King

4 awards

- Ben Burtt †

3 awards

- Charles L. Campbell
- Per Hallberg
- Richard Hymns
- Gary Rydstrom

2 awards

- Bub Asman
- Karen Baker Landers
- Christopher Boyes
- Mike Hopkins
- Stephen Hunter Flick †
- Alan Robert Murray
- Paul N. J. Ottosson
- George Watters II
- Ethan Van der Ryn

=== Multiple nominations ===
10 nominations

- Alan Robert Murray

9 nominations

- Richard Hymns

8 nominations

- Gary Rydstrom
- George Watters II
- Ben Burtt †

7 nominations

- Wylie Stateman

6 nominations

- Bub Asman
- Christopher Boyes
- Richard King
- Mark Mangini
- Michael Silvers
- Ethan Van der Ryn

5 nominations

- Stephen Hunter Flick †
- Bruce Stambler
- Matthew Wood

4 nominations

- Lon Bender
- Charles L. Campbell
- Per Hallberg
- John Leveque
- Randy Thom

3 nominations

- Richard L. Anderson †
- Mike Hopkins
- Skip Lievsay
- Paul N. J. Ottosson
- Mark Stoeckinger
- Gwendolyn Yates Whittle
- John Wilkinson (sound engineer)

2 nominations

- Erik Aadahl
- Karen Baker Landers
- Tom Bellfort
- Steve Boeddeker
- Gloria S. Borders
- Robert Bratton
- Brent Burge
- Glenn Freemantle
- Eugene Gearty
- Cecelia Hall
- Robert G. Henderson
- Martin Hernández
- Mildred Iatrou Morgan
- Ren Klyce
- Ai-Ling Lee
- Tom Myers
- Walter Rossi
- Philip Stockton
- Oliver Tarney

† = includes special achievement awards

== Age superlatives ==
Record	Sound engineer	Film	Age
Oldest winner	Richard King	Dune: Part Two	85 years, 25 days
Oldest nominee	Richard King	Dune: Part Two	84 years, 352 days
Youngest winner	Christopher Boyes	Titanic	25-26 years
Youngest nominee	Larry Johnson	Woodstock	23 years, 257 days

== Shortlisted finalists ==
Finalists for Best Sound are selected by the Sound Branch. Sound Branch members shall vote in order of their preference for not more than ten pictures to be considered for the Sound award. The ten motion pictures receiving the highest number of votes shall advance to the next round of voting. Finalists listed from 1981 to 2005 are for the now defunct award for Best Sound Effects Editing.

Year	Finalists	Ref
1965	Cat Ballou, Dr. Goldfoot and the Bikini Machine, The Greatest Story Ever Told, I'll Take Sweden, In Harm's Way, That Darn Cat!	
1966	The Bible: In the Beginning..., Boy, Did I Get a Wrong Number!, Lt. Robin Crusoe, U.S.N., The Liquidator, A Man for All Seasons, Nevada Smith, The Professionals	
1967	Casino Royale, El Dorado, Guess Who's Coming to Dinner, In Cold Blood, Sofi	
1968	Blackbeard's Ghost, Chitty Chitty Bang Bang, Head, Hell in the Pacific, The Lion in Winter, The Odd Couple, The Shoes of the Fisherman, 2001: A Space Odyssey, Yours, Mine and Ours	
1969	Downhill Racer, Paint Your Wagon, The Reivers, The Secret of Santa Vittoria, The Wild Bunch	
1970	Cromwell, The Great White Hope, The Hawaiians, Little Big Man, Scrooge	
1971	A Clockwork Orange, Dirty Harry, The Last Picture Show, Le Mans, Shaft	
1972	Avanti!, Deliverance, Lady Sings the Blues, Man of La Mancha, Pete 'n' Tillie	
1973	Dillinger, Oklahoma Crude, The Seven-Ups, The Way We Were, Westworld	
1974	Airport 1975, The Front Page, The Godfather Part II, The Taking of Pelham One Two Three, Zandy's Bride	
1975	Barry Lyndon, Lucky Lady, Nashville, One Flew Over the Cuckoo's Nest, The Sunshine Boys	
1976	Logan's Run, Midway, Network, The Omen, Silent Movie	
1977	Black Sunday, Julia, Looking for Mr. Goodbar, MacArthur, Rollercoaster	
1978	The Boys from Brazil, Grease, The Lord of the Rings, Midnight Express, An Unmarried Woman	
1979	All That Jazz, The Black Hole, The China Syndrome, Rocky II, Star Trek: The Motion Picture	
1981	Dragonslayer, Heaven's Gate, Reds, Sharky's Machine, Sphinx, Stripes, Superman II, Time Bandits, Wolfen	
1982	Conan the Barbarian, The Dark Crystal, Gandhi, Tron	
1983	Blue Thunder, The Golden Seal, Never Cry Wolf, Sudden Impact, WarGames	
1984	Dune, Gremlins, Indiana Jones and the Temple of Doom, 2010: The Year We Make Contact	
1985	American Flyers, The Emerald Forest, Runaway Train, Year of the Dragon	
1986	The Color of Money, Platoon, Tai-Pan	
1987	Batteries Not Included, Cry Freedom, Full Metal Jacket, Lethal Weapon, Predator, The Witches of Eastwick	
1988	Beetlejuice, Mississippi Burning	
1989	Born on the Fourth of July, Glory, The Winter War	
1990	Dances With Wolves, Goodfellas	
1991	Beauty and the Beast, For the Boys, Hook, The Last Boy Scout	
1992	The Last of the Mohicans, Lethal Weapon 3, Patriot Games, Unforgiven	
1993	Geronimo: An American Legend	
1994	The Shawshank Redemption, True Lies	
1995	Apollo 13, Heat, Under Siege 2: Dark Territory, Waterworld	
1996	Independence Day, The Rock, Star Trek: First Contact, Twister	
1997	Con Air, L.A. Confidential, The Lost World: Jurassic Park, Men in Black	
1998	Godzilla, Lethal Weapon 4, Ronin, The Thin Red Line	
1999	Any Given Sunday, The Green Mile, The Mummy, Three Kings	
2000	Cast Away, Gladiator, Mission: Impossible 2, The Perfect Storm, Unbreakable	
2001	A.I. Artificial Intelligence, Amélie, Black Hawk Down, The Fast and the Furious, The Lord of the Rings: The Fellowship of the Ring	
2002	Harry Potter and the Chamber of Secrets, Spider-Man, We Were Soldiers, xXx	
2003	Kill Bill: Volume 1, The Last Samurai, The Lord of the Rings: The Return of the King, Seabiscuit	
2004	The Aviator, Collateral, The Day After Tomorrow, Ray	
2005	The Chronicles of Narnia: The Lion, the Witch, and the Wardrobe, Harry Potter and the Goblet of Fire, Walk the Line, Star Wars: Episode III – Revenge of the Sith	
2021	Last Night in Soho, The Matrix Resurrections, A Quiet Place Part II, Spider-Man: No Way Home, Tick, Tick...Boom!	
2022	Babylon, Black Panther: Wakanda Forever, Everything Everywhere All at Once, Guillermo del Toro's Pinocchio, Moonage Daydream	
2023	Barbie, Ferrari, The Killer, Killers of the Flower Moon, Napoleon	
2024	Alien: Romulus, Blitz, Deadpool & Wolverine, Gladiator II, Joker: Folie à Deux	
2025	Avatar: Fire and Ash, Mission: Impossible – The Final Reckoning, Springsteen: Deliver Me from Nowhere, Superman, Wicked: For Good	

== See also ==
- BAFTA Award for Best Sound
- Critics' Choice Movie Award for Best Sound
- Motion Picture Sound Editors Golden Reel Awards
- List of Academy Award–nominated films
