= Robert W. Glass Jr. =

American sound engineer

- Occupation: Sound engineer
- Years active: 1977–1999

Robert W. Glass Jr. is an American sound engineer. He was nominated for two Academy Awards in the category Best Sound for the films Days of Heaven and Outland.

== Selected filmography ==
- Days of Heaven (1978; co-nominated with John Wilkinson, John T. Reitz and Barry Thomas)
- Outland (1981; co-nominated with John Wilkinson, Robert Thirlwell and Robin Gregory)
