= Thirlwell =

Thirlwell may refer to:

- Adam Thirlwell (born 1978), British novelist
- Curly Thirlwell, American sound engineer
- J. G. Thirlwell (born 1960), Australian vocalist, composer and record producer
- Paul Thirlwell (born 1979), English footballer
- Robert Thirlwell, American sound engineer
