= Bud Alper =

American sound engineer (1930–2012)

- Born: August 24, 1930
- Died: December 19, 2012 (aged 82)
- Occupation: Sound engineer
- Years active: 1967–2000

Bud Alper (August 24, 1930 – December 19, 2012) was an American sound engineer. He was nominated for two Academy Awards in the category Best Sound.

== Selected filmography ==
- Rocky (1976)
- Ladyhawke (1985)
