= Graham V. Hartstone =

British sound engineer

- Born: 1944 (age 81–82); Uxbridge, England
- Occupation: Sound engineer
- Years active: 1962-present

Graham V. Hartstone (born in June 1944) is a British sound engineer. He has been nominated for three Academy Awards in the category Best Sound. He has worked on over 190 films since 1962.

== Selected filmography ==
- Superman (1978)
- A Passage to India (1984)
- Aliens (1986)
