= Al Overton =

Sound engineer

- Born: May 20, 1912; Connecticut, United States
- Died: August 1, 1985 (aged 73); San Clemente, California, United States
- Occupation: Sound engineer
- Years active: 1954-1975

Al Overton (May 20, 1912 – August 1, 1985) was an American sound engineer. He was nominated for an Academy Award in the category Best Sound for the film Diamonds Are Forever. He worked on more than 90 films between 1954 and 1975. His son, Al Overton Jr., was later nominated for four Academy Awards for Best Sound.

== Selected filmography ==
- Diamonds Are Forever (1971)
