= Jack Whitney =

American sound engineer

- Born: February 21, 1905; Iowa, United States
- Died: November 2, 1992 (aged 87); San Diego, California, United States
- Occupation: Sound engineer
- Years active: 1940–1947

Jack Whitney (February 21, 1905 – November 2, 1992) was an American sound engineer. He won two Academy Awards, one for Best Sound Recording and the other for Best Visual Effects. He was nominated six more times in the category Best Sound.

Whitney was born in Eagle Grove Iowa; in the 1940’s, he moved out of Eagle Grove into Hollywood, where he was promptly sent to Paris. He worked under the Sound Services Company. He was hired for Sound services after helping fix the sound system within a cinema, which he had previous experience with due to his previous work of making radios.

== Selected filmography ==
Won

- The Thief of Bagdad (1940 – Best Special Effects)
- That Hamilton Woman (1941 – Best Sound)

Nominated

- The Howards of Virginia (1940)
- Friendly Enemies (1942)
- Hangmen Also Die! (1943)
- It Happened Tomorrow (1944)
- The Southerner (1945)
- T-Men (1947)
