= John W. Mitchell =

British sound engineer (1917–2005)

- Born: John William Mitchell; 14 June 1917; Wakefield, Yorkshire, England
- Died: 21 November 2005 (aged 88); Cheltenham, Gloucestershire, England
- Occupation: Sound engineer
- Years active: 1934-1998

John William Mitchell, MBE (14 June 1917 – 21 November 2005) was a British sound engineer. Throughout his career, he was nominated for two Academy Awards in the category Best Sound, working on 170 films between 1934 and 1998.

== Selected filmography ==
- Diamonds Are Forever (1971)
- A Passage to India (1984)
