= Gene Cantamessa =

American sound engineer

- Born: February 17, 1931; New York City, New York, United States
- Died: November 8, 2011 (aged 80); Los Angeles, California, United States
- Occupation: Sound engineer
- Years active: 1969–1999

Gene Cantamessa (February 17, 1931 – November 8, 2011) was an American sound engineer. He won an Academy Award for Best Sound for his work on the 1982 Steven Spielberg film, E.T. the Extra-Terrestrial. Cantamessa received six additional Academy Award nominations in the same category during his career.

== Selected filmography ==
Cantamessa won an Academy Award and was nominated for six more:

Won

- E.T. the Extra-Terrestrial (1982)

Nominated

- The Candidate (1972)
- Young Frankenstein (1974)
- Close Encounters of the Third Kind (1977)
- 1941 (1979)
- 2010: The Year We Make Contact (1984)
- Star Trek IV: The Voyage Home (1986)
