= James Corcoran (sound engineer) =

American sound engineer

- Occupation: Sound engineer
- Years active: 1963 – 1970

James Corcoran was an American sound engineer. He won an Academy Award for Sound Recording and was nominated for three more in the same category.

== Selected filmography ==
Corcoran won an Academy Award and was nominated for three more:

Won

- The Sound of Music (1965)

Nominated

- Cleopatra (1963)
- The Agony and the Ecstasy (1965)
- The Sand Pebbles (1966)
