= Fred Hynes =

American sound engineer

- Born: May 8, 1908; Nashville, Tennessee, United States
- Died: February 10, 1992 (aged 83); Los Angeles, California, United States
- Occupation: Sound engineer
- Years active: 1933–1972

Fred Hynes (May 8, 1908 – February 10, 1992) was an American sound engineer. He won five Academy Awards in the category Sound Recording and was nominated for two more in the same category.

== Selected filmography ==
Hynes won five Academy Awards and was nominated for two more:

Won

- Oklahoma! (1955)
- South Pacific (1958)
- The Alamo (1960)
- West Side Story (1961)
- The Sound of Music (1965)

Nominated

- Porgy and Bess (1959)
- Cleopatra (1963)
