= The Devil Pays Off =

1941 film

- Film poster
- Directed by: John H. Auer
- Written by: Lawrence Kimble; Malcolm Stuart Boylan; George Worthing Yates; Julian Zimet
- Produced by: Albert J. Cohen
- Starring: J. Edward Bromberg; Osa Massen; William Wright
- Cinematography: John Alton
- Edited by: Howard O'Neill
- Music by: Cy Feuer
- Production company: Republic Pictures
- Distributed by: Republic Pictures
- Release date: November 10, 1941
- Running time: 70 minutes
- Country: United States
- Language: English

The Devil Pays Off is a 1941 American spy thriller film directed by John H. Auer and starring J. Edward Bromberg, Osa Massen and William Wright. It was produced and distributed by Republic Pictures. The film was nominated for an Academy Award for Best Sound Recording (Charles L. Lootens).

== Plot ==
The former naval lieutenant Chris Waring is awakened by the police late time and delivered to Admiral Curtiss, his former commander. The admiral asks Waring for his support in an undercover operation. The op is about the shipowner Arnold Debrock, who sold ships to the United States but later got manipulated by enemy powers in a mysterious way. Since Curtiss knows that Chris is successful with women, he asks him to flirt with Debrocks's wife Valerie Avancen. Chris initially refuses to participate, but he changes his opinion in a short while after seeing Valerie boarding a ship to Havana and takes up the pursuit of the beautiful woman.

He actually succeeds in flirting viciously with Valerie and to get her to go with him to his cabin. There, however, they both meet, for Chris's great surprise, Joan Millard, the Admiral Curtiss's secretary. Asked by Valerie, Joan introduces herself as Chris's wife, and Valerie also reveals her identity and says that she left her husband. Joan tells speechless Chris that Curtiss has sent her to support him. The couple has to begin with their investigations against its will.

Some time later, the ship finds a man in the sea, Capt. Jonathan Hunt. He tells Chris that he worked at the Debrock shipping company and that his crew mutinied against him after he refused to comply with Debrock's order to moor in a foreign port. He was then deprived of his position. Capt. Brigham, however, believes that Hunt has fallen victim to the sea. After the ship reaches Havana, Chris and Joan try to get more information from Valerie. Brigham is attacked by Debrock, who is angry that Hunt, as everyone believes, has been sent to certain death. However, Hunt holds back allegations since measures have been taken to prevent him from talking about the incident.

Shortly thereafter, Debrock tries to convince Valerie that he will soon leave the business to retreat to private life together with her. Valerie, however, tells her husband that she does not love him anymore. These words affect him very much, and he tries to shoot Chris but misses. Meanwhile, Chris learns that Carlos Castillo-Martinez, whom he regarded as a craftsman, actually belongs to the Cuban military secret service and is also involved in the investigation against Debrock.

Chris, Joan, Carlos, and Hunt attend a farewell dinner. Debrock sees Hunt and feels deeply insecure as he thinks that Hunt may expose him and prevent further orders to deploy his ships in enemy ports. Carlos arrests all those involved in Debrock's affair, while Chris compels Debrock to order his ships to go to American ports. When trying to get to Chris' weapon, Debrock falls out of the window during the fight between the two. After the case is solved, Chris and Joan want to marry as soon as possible.

== Cast ==
- J. Edward Bromberg as Arnold DeBrock
- Osa Massen as Valeria DeBrock
- William Wright as Christopher Waring
- Margaret Tallichet as Joan Millard
- Abner Biberman as Carlos Castillo-Martinez
- Martin Kosleck as Grebb, Henchman
- Charles D. Brown as Capt. Jonathan Hunt
- Roland Varno as Ship's Doctor

== Bibliography ==
- Fetrow, Alan G. Feature Films, 1940-1949: a United States Filmography. McFarland, 1994.
