= Mark Berger (sound engineer) =

American sound engineer

- Born: May 14, 1943 (age 83); San Francisco, California, United States
- Occupation: Sound engineer
- Years active: 1973–present

Mark Berger (born May 14, 1943) is an American sound engineer. He has won four Academy Awards for Best Sound. He is the first person to hold the Academy Award record for "perfect score" with 4 nominations and 4 wins. He is best known for his work on The Godfather Part II (1974), One Flew Over the Cuckoo's Nest (1975) and Apocalypse Now (1979). He has worked on more than 170 films since 1973.

== Background ==
Berger studied experimental psychology at the University of California, Berkeley. He took part in the recording of some documentaries for radio about the opposition to Vietnam. Through this work, he got a job in the South focused on the civil rights of workers. He spent nine months in New Orleans making the film. When he returned to Berkeley, he started to realize that his filming experience was more interesting than his studies and he found a job recording sound for a documentary on the programs of the U.S. Agency for International Development [USAID]. He visited 11 countries in the course of 7 days.

== Career beginnings ==
After Berger worked on the documentary The Place for No Story, Walter Murch noticed him. Murch was an editor and sound mixer who had been working with George Lucas and Francis Ford Coppola. He tried to recruit Berger for Coppola’s new film – The Conversation – but Berger was committed to a trip to Cuba to interview Fidel Castro. When Berger returned and got in touch with Murch he was offered the job of working on The Godfather, Part II. This was his first job in feature film.

== Personal life ==
Berger created, and has been teaching the “Film 140: The Sound of Film” course at UC Berkeley in their undergraduate program since the year 2000. Berger is married to former Berkeley City Council member Susan Wengraf.

== Selected filmography ==
- Apocalypse Now (1979)
- The Right Stuff (1983)
- Amadeus (1984)
- The English Patient (1996)
