= Don Bassman =

American sound engineer

- Born: April 2, 1927; United States
- Died: January 24, 1993 (aged 64); Hollywood Hills, California, United States
- Occupation: Sound engineer
- Years active: 1958-1992

Don Bassman (April 2, 1927 – January 24, 1993) was an American sound engineer and VP of Special Sound Projects at 20th Century Fox. He won an Academy Award for Best Sound for Patton and was nominated for Die Hard, The Abyss and The Hunt for Red October in the same category. He also won an Emmy Award for Eleanor and Franklin.

== Selected filmography ==
Bassman won an Academy Award and was nominated for three more:

Won

- Patton (1970)

Nominated

- Die Hard (1988)
- The Abyss (1989)
- The Hunt for Red October (1990)
