= George Groves (sound engineer) =

English film sound pioneer

- Born: George Robert Groves; 13 December 1901; St Helens, Lancashire, England
- Died: 4 September 1976 (aged 74)
- Occupation: Sound engineer
- Years active: 1926-1970
- Spouse: Jane (?-?)

George Robert Groves (13 December 1901 – 4 September 1976) was a film sound pioneer who played a significant role in developing the technology that brought sound to the silent screen. He is also credited as being Hollywood's first ‘sound man’; he was the recording engineer on the seminal Al Jolson picture, The Jazz Singer (1927), as well as many other early talkies. In a career with Warner Brothers that spanned 46 years, he rose to become their Director of Sound and won two Academy Awards out of eight nominations in total.

== Early life ==
George was born on 13 December 1901 over a barber's shop at 57 Duke Street, St Helens, Lancashire, England. His father, George Alfred Groves, was a master barber and talented musician who founded the first brass band in St Helens. His son George Jr. was proficient in a number of instruments and regularly played the cornet in the town's Theatre Royal. He was also a lather boy in his father's two barber shops in Duke Street and Owen Street.

George was educated at Nutgrove Junior School and Cowley Grammar School in St. Helens. After gaining a scholarship to Liverpool University, he graduated in 1922 with an honours degree in Engineering and Telephony. He spent a year in Coventry working for GEC developing early wireless receivers and then applied for employment in the United States. On 1 December 1923, George sailed to New York on the SS Laconia for what he thought would be a two-year engagement.

== Career ==
He obtained a position with the research team at Bell Laboratories who were developing film sound technology using the sound-on-disc process. In 1925, Warner Brothers bought the Bell system and created the Vitaphone Corporation. In 1926, George Groves was assigned to Vitaphone and was charged with recording the soundtrack to the John Barrymore picture, Don Juan (1926). This was the first full-length film to have a synchronized soundtrack, provided by the New York Philharmonic. Groves devised an innovative, multi-microphone technique and performed a live mix of the 107-strong orchestra. In doing so he became the first music mixer in film history.

George Groves then recorded the sound for The Jazz Singer (1927) a ground-breaking motion picture which revolutionized the film industry. The star of the film, Al Jolson, dubbed George The Quiet Little Englishman and insisted that he alone record his pictures. In recording the sound for The Jazz Singer, Groves became the first ever production recordist.

During World War II, Groves served with the First Motion Picture Unit of the Army Air Force.

In his lengthy Warner Brothers career, George Groves pioneered numerous other sound techniques and practices that the film and television industries take for granted today, including ADR and the use of radio microphones. He won two Oscars for Best Sound for his work on the films Sayonara (1957) and My Fair Lady (1964). His Oscar for the latter was presented to him on stage at the Academy Awards of 1965 by Steve McQueen and Claudia Cardinale. In total, Groves worked on thirty-two films that received Academy Award nominations for best sound.

In 1957, George Groves became Director of Sound at Warner Brothers, and in 1972, the year of his retirement, he was awarded the prestigious Samuel L. Warner memorial award by the Society of Motion Picture Engineers. George died of a heart attack on 4 September 1976. He is interred in the Forest Lawn Memorial Park (Hollywood Hills).

=== Academy Awards ===
Groves won two Academy Awards and was nominated for six more in the category Best Sound.

Won

- Sayonara (1957)
- My Fair Lady (1964)

Nominated

- Song of the Flame (1930)
- The Nun's Story (1959)
- Sunrise at Campobello (1960)
- The Music Man (1962)
- The Great Race (1965)
- Who's Afraid of Virginia Woolf? (1966)

== Campaign for recognition ==
In 1993, George Groves’ 92-year-old sister, Hilda Barrow from Liverpool, began a campaign for official recognition in the United Kingdom of her brother's pioneering work. As a result, in 1996 two British Film Industry plaques were unveiled to commemorate his achievements. One was at Groves' birthplace in Duke Street, St Helens, the other was in a prestigious Warners Cinema in London's West End.
