= Nicolas Le Messurier =

English sound engineer

- Occupation: Sound engineer
- Years active: 1968-present

Nicolas Le Messurier is an English sound engineer. He has been nominated for three Academy Awards in the category Best Sound. He has worked on more than 150 films since 1968.

== Selected filmography ==
- Superman (1978)
- A Passage to India (1984)
- Aliens (1986)
