= Tony Johnson (sound engineer) =

New Zealand sound engineer

- Occupation: Sound engineer
- Years active: 1981–present

Tony Johnson is a New Zealand sound engineer. He has been nominated for three Academy Awards in the category Best Sound Mixing. He has worked on more than 30 films since 1981.

== Selected filmography ==
- The Chronicles of Narnia: The Lion, the Witch and the Wardrobe (2005)
- Avatar (2009)
- The Hobbit: The Desolation of Smaug (2013)
