= Petur Hliddal =

American sound engineer

- Born: 1945 (age 80–81)
- Occupation: Sound engineer
- Years active: 1972–present

Petur Hliddal (born 1945) is an American sound engineer. He has been nominated for two Academy Awards in the category Best Sound. He has worked on more than 80 films since 1972.

== Selected filmography ==
- Batman Forever (1995)
- The Aviator (2004)
