= Stephen Dunn (sound engineer) =

American sound engineer

- Born: December 26, 1894; Modesto, California, United States
- Died: February 3, 1980 (aged 85); Napa, California, United States
- Occupation: Sound engineer
- Years active: 1942–1947

Stephen Dunn (December 26, 1894 – February 3, 1980) was an American sound engineer. He won two Academy Awards in the category Best Sound Recording and was nominated twice more in the same category.

== Selected filmography ==
Won

- This Land Is Mine (1943)
- The Bells of St. Mary's (1945)

Nominated

- Once Upon a Honeymoon (1942)
- Music in Manhattan (1944)
