= Bob Jones (sound engineer) =

British sound engineer

- Occupation: Sound engineer
- Years active: 1952 – 1985

Bob Jones was a British sound engineer. He was nominated for an Academy Award in the category Best Sound for the film Mary, Queen of Scots. He worked on over 100 films between 1952 and 1985.

Bob Jones was nominated together with John Cox (sound engineer) in 1969 for the British Academy Film Award in the Best Sound category, presented for the first time by the British Academy of Film and Television Arts, for the film adaptation of the Charles Dickens novel Oliver Twist, Oliver (Oliver! (film), 1968) by Carol Reed with Mark Lester, Ron Moody and Shani Wallis.

== Selected filmography ==
- Moulin Rouge (1952 film) (1952)
- Derby Day (1952 film) (1952)
- The Silent Enemy (1958 film) (1958)
- Saturday Night and Sunday Morning (film) (1960)
- The Entertainer (1960 film) (1960)
- A Taste of Honey (film) (1961)
- Lawrence of Arabia (film) (1962)
- The Loneliness of the Long Distance Runner (film) (1962)
- Billy Liar (film) (1963)
- A Hard Day's Night (film) (1964)
- A Man for All Seasons (1966 film) (1966)
- Casino Royale (1967 film) (1967)
- Oliver! (film) (1968)
- Mary, Queen of Scots (1971)
- The Man Who Fell to Earth (1976)
- Ordeal by Innocence (film) (1984)
