= Aaron Rochin =

American sound engineer

- Occupation: Sound engineer
- Years active: 1967–1998

Aaron Rochin is an American sound engineer. He won an Oscar for Best Sound and was nominated for eight more in the same category.

Rochin's Oscar statuette was blemished, so it was replaced with a temporary award whilst the original was repaired. However, the original was stolen and never recovered. In 2011 a man was charged with selling a stolen Oscar statuette that might have been Rochin's original.

== Selected filmography ==
Rochin won an Academy Award and was nominated for eight more:

Won

- The Deer Hunter (1978)

Nominated

- The Wind and the Lion (1975)
- King Kong (1976)
- Meteor (1979)
- Fame (1980)
- WarGames (1983)
- 2010: The Year We Make Contact (1984)
- RoboCop (1987)
- Total Recall (1990)
