= Arthur Piantadosi =

American sound engineer

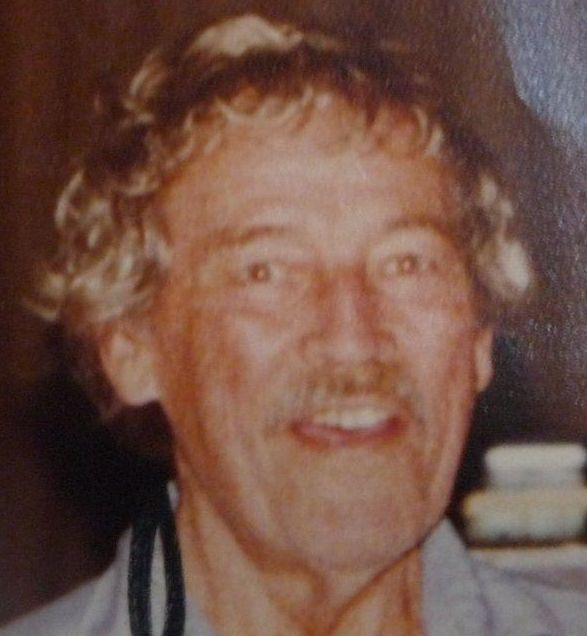
- Born: November 4, 1916; Brooklyn, New York, U.S.
- Died: February 23, 1994 (aged 77); Newport Beach, California, U.S.
- Occupation: Sound engineer
- Years active: 1935—1987

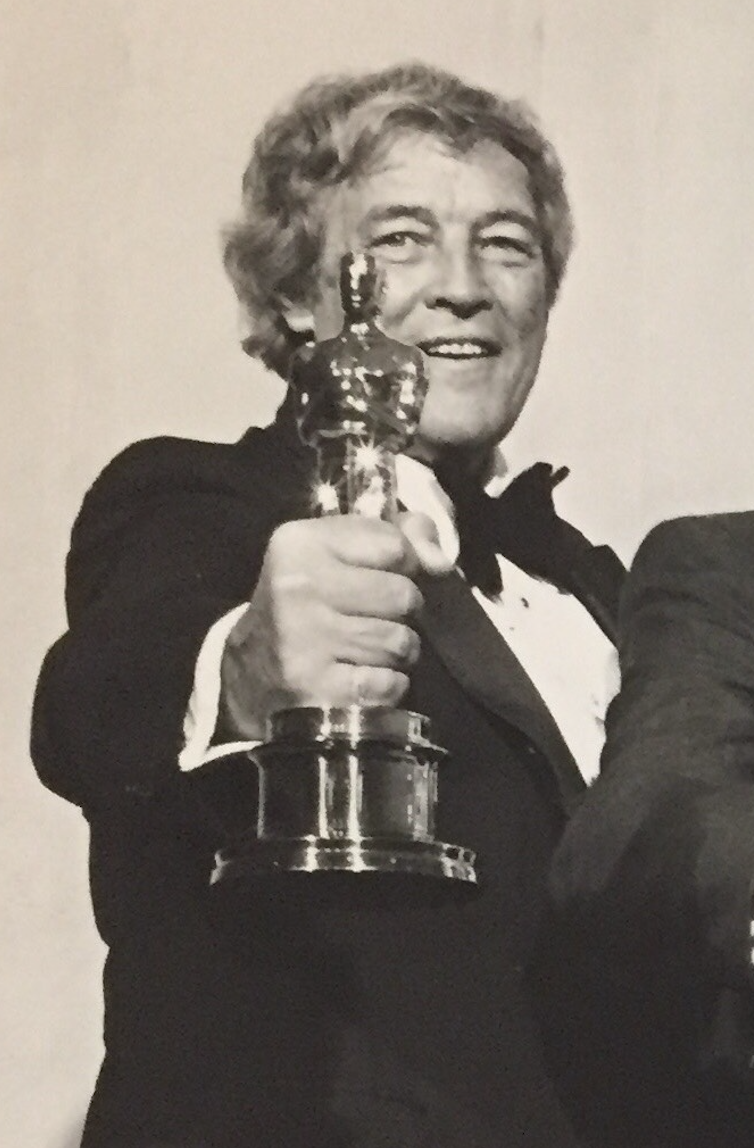
Arthur Piantadosi holding his 1976 sound Oscar for All the President's Men

Arthur Piantadosi (November 4, 1916 – February 23, 1994) was an American sound engineer. He won an Academy Award for Best Sound for the Robert Redford film All the President's Men and was nominated for six more in the same category. He won a BAFTA Award in 1973 for Best Sound for the 1972 film Cabaret.

He worked as a music mixer for Warner Brothers, 20th Century-Fox, Columbia Pictures, Republic Pictures, and Universal Studios. During World War II, he worked for the Office of Strategic Services in John Ford's department. He was the nephew of composer Al Piantadosi.

== Selected filmography ==
Piantadosi won an Academy Award and was nominated for another six:

Won

- All the President's Men (1976)

Nominated

- Marooned (1969)
- Butterflies Are Free (1972)
- Bite the Bullet (1975)
- The Electric Horseman (1979)
- Altered States (1980)
- Tootsie (1982)
