= Dick Alexander =

American sound engineer

- Occupation: Sound engineer
- Years active: 1975-present

Dick Alexander is an American sound engineer. He won two Academy Awards for Best Sound and was nominated for six more in the same category. He has worked on over 170 films and television shows since 1975.

== Selected filmography ==
Alexander won two Academy Awards for Best Sound and was nominated for another six:

Won

- All the President's Men (1976)
- Bird (1988)

Nominated

- The Deep (1977)
- Tootsie (1982)
- Ladyhawke (1985)
- Heartbreak Ridge (1986)
- Lethal Weapon (1987)
- Unforgiven (1992)
