= William B. Kaplan =

American sound engineer

William “Bill” B. Kaplan
- Born: December 18, 1944 (age 81)
- Occupation: Sound engineer
- Years active: 1972–present

William B. Kaplan (born December 18, 1944) is an American sound engineer. He has over 125 credits to his name and has been nominated for seven Academy Awards in the category Best Sound. He has worked on over 80 films since 1972. Bill is still working at a high level as of April 2025.

== Selected filmography ==
- Back to the Future (1985)
- Top Gun (1986)
- Forrest Gump (1994)
- Crimson Tide (1995)
- Contact (1997)
- Cast Away (2000)
- The Polar Express (2004)

== Awards ==
Kaplan has won two Cinema Audio Society Awards: one for Forrest Gump, and in 2020 he was given their Career Achievement Award. He was nominated for awards due to his work on Crimson Tide, Cast Away, and The Contact.
