= Al Overton Jr. =

American sound engineer

- Occupation: Sound engineer
- Years active: 1969 – 1991

Al Overton Jr. is an American sound engineer. He has been nominated for four Academy Awards in the category Best Sound. He has worked on more than 40 films between 1969 and 1991. His father, Al Overton, was also nominated for an Academy Award for Best Sound.

== Selected filmography ==
- Bite the Bullet (1975)
- The Electric Horseman (1979)
- Pennies from Heaven (1981)
- Die Hard (1988)
