= Richard Overton (sound engineer) =

American sound engineer

- Occupation: Sound engineer
- Years active: 1963-1992

Richard Overton is an American sound engineer. He was nominated for three Academy Awards in the category Best Sound. He worked on more than 60 films during his career.

== Selected filmography ==
- Die Hard (1988)
- The Abyss (1989)
- The Hunt for Red October (1990)
