= Vern Poore =

American sound engineer

- Occupation: Sound engineer
- Years active: 1975 – 1996

Vern Poore is an American sound engineer. He won an Academy Award for Best Sound and has been nominated for four more in the same category. He worked on over 60 films between 1975 and 1996.

== Selected filmography ==
Poore won an Academy Award for Best Sound and has been nominated for another four:

Won

- Bird (1988)

Nominated

- Ladyhawke (1985)
- Heartbreak Ridge (1986)
- Lethal Weapon (1987)
- Unforgiven (1992)
