= Elliot Tyson =

American sound engineer

- Born: November 20, 1952 (age 73); Santa Monica, California, United States
- Occupation: Sound engineer
- Years active: 1979–present

Elliot Tyson (born November 20, 1952) is an American sound engineer. He won an Academy Award for Best Sound and has been nominated for three more in the same category. He has worked on more than 160 films since 1979.

== Selected filmography ==
Tyson won an Academy Award for Best Sound and has been nominated for another three:

Won

- Glory (1989)

Nominated

- Mississippi Burning (1988)
- The Shawshank Redemption (1994)
- The Green Mile (1999)
