= Charles Rice (sound engineer) =

American sound engineer

- Occupation: Sound engineer
- Years active: 1960 – 1963

Charles Rice was an American sound engineer. He was nominated for two Academy Awards in the category Sound Recording.

== Selected filmography ==
- Pepe (1960)
- Bye Bye Birdie (1963)
