= Jack Solomon =

American sound engineer

- Born: March 8, 1913; Manhattan, New York, United States
- Died: November 8, 2002 (aged 89); Los Angeles, California, United States
- Occupation: Sound engineer
- Years active: 1953–1991

Jack Solomon (March 8, 1913 – November 8, 2002) was an American sound engineer. He won an Oscar for Sound Recording and was nominated for five more in the same category. He worked on over 90 films between 1953 and 1991.

== Selected filmography ==
Solomon won an Academy Award and was nominated for five more:

Won

- Hello, Dolly! (1969)

Nominated

- Kotch (1971)
- Funny Lady (1975)
- King Kong (1976)
- Hooper (1978)
- Meteor (1979)
