= Donald O. Mitchell =

American sound engineer

- Occupation: Sound engineer
- Years active: 1973-2002

Donald O. Mitchell is an American sound engineer. He won an Oscar for Best Sound and was nominated for thirteen more in the same category. He worked on nearly 120 films between 1973 and 2002.

In 2013, Donald Mitchell received an honorary award at the Motion Picture Editors Guild.

== Selected filmography ==
Mitchell won an Academy Awards for Best Sound and was nominated for thirteen more:

Won

- Glory (1989)

Nominated

- The Paper Chase (1973)
- Silver Streak (1976)
- Raging Bull (1980)
- Terms of Endearment (1983)
- Silverado (1985)
- A Chorus Line (1985)
- Top Gun (1986)
- Black Rain (1989)
- Days of Thunder (1990)
- Under Siege (1992)
- The Fugitive (1993)
- Clear and Present Danger (1994)
- Batman Forever (1995)
