= Robert J. Litt =

American sound engineer

- Occupation: Sound engineer
- Years active: 1964-2000

Robert J. Litt is an American sound engineer. He was nominated for three Academy Awards in the category Best Sound. He worked on over 160 films between 1964 and 2000.

== Selected filmography ==
- Mississippi Burning (1988)
- The Shawshank Redemption (1994)
- The Green Mile (1999)
