= Wesley C. Miller =

American sound engineer (1894–1962)

- Born: December 27, 1894; Haverhill, Massachusetts, United States
- Died: April 19, 1962 (aged 67); Los Angeles, California, United States
- Occupation: Sound engineer
- Years active: 1929-1959

Wesley C. Miller (December 27, 1894 – April 19, 1962) was an American sound engineer. He was nominated for four Academy Awards, three in the category Sound Recording and one for Best Effects, Special Effects.

== Selected filmography ==
- Brigadoon (1954)
- Love Me or Leave Me (1955)
- Forbidden Planet (1956)
- Les Girls (1957)
