= Sam Slyfield =

Sound engineer

- Born: May 11, 1898; Frankfort, Michigan
- Died: January 15, 1974 (aged 75); Escondido, California
- Occupation: Sound engineer
- Years active: 1940–1955

Sam Slyfield (May 11, 1898 – January 15, 1974) was an American sound engineer. He was nominated for four Academy Awards in the category Best Sound Recording.

== Selected filmography ==
- Bambi (1942)
- Saludos Amigos (1942)
- The Three Caballeros (1944)
- Cinderella (1950)
