= Art Rochester =

American sound engineer

- Born: Arthur Rochester; February 25, 1944 (age 82); Los Angeles, California, U.S.
- Occupation: Sound engineer
- Years active: 1970-2008

Art Rochester (born February 25, 1944) is an American sound engineer. He has been nominated for five Academy Awards in the category Best Sound. He worked on more than 60 films from 1970 to 2008.

== Selected filmography ==
- The Conversation (1974)
- The Witches of Eastwick (1987)
- Clear and Present Danger (1994)
- Con Air (1997)
- Master and Commander: The Far Side of the World (2003)
