= Walter Rossi (sound editor) =

Sound editor (1894–1978)

- Born: July 12, 1894; New York, U.S.
- Died: February 12, 1978 (aged 83); Los Angeles County, California
- Occupation: Sound editor
- Years active: 1953-1970

Walter Rossi (July 12, 1894 – February 12, 1978) was a sound editor who won 1 Academy Award and was nominated for 2 more Academy Awards.

== Oscar nominations ==
- 1957 Academy Awards-Award for The Enemy Below in the category of Best Special Effects . Won.
- 1965 Academy Awards-Nominated for Von Ryan's Express in the category of Best Sound Editing. Lost to The Great Race.
- 1966 Academy Awards-Nominated for Fantastic Voyage in the category of Best Sound Editing. Lost to Grand Prix.

== Filmography ==
- The Robe (1953)
- Prince of Players (1955)
- The Enemy Below (1957)
- The Barbarian and the Geisha (1958)
- Von Ryan's Express (1965)
- Fantastic Voyage (1966)
- Motorista Sem Limites (1970)
