= Michael A. Carter =

British sound engineer

- Died: 21 September 2004
- Occupation: Dubbing mixer
- Years active: 1984–2004

Michael A. Carter (died 21 September 2004) was a British sound engineer. He was nominated for two Oscars in the Best Sound category for A Passage to India in 1985 and for Aliens in 1987 and was also nominated for a BAFTA in the Best Sound category in 1996 for GoldenEye. He worked on over 60 films between 1984 and 2004.

== Selected filmography ==
- A Passage to India (1984)
- Aliens (1986)
- GoldenEye (1995)
