= James L. Fields =

American sound engineer

- Born: 1905
- Died: December 1977 (aged 71–72)
- Occupation: Sound engineer
- Years active: 1931 – 1976

James L. Fields (1905 – December 1977) was an American sound engineer. He was nominated for two Academy Awards in the category Best Sound Recording. He worked on 400 films over a period of 45 years.

== Selected filmography ==
- The Gold Rush (1942 re-release)
- So This Is Washington (1943)
