= Murray Spivack =

American sound engineer (1903–1994)

- Born: September 6, 1903; Russian Empire
- Died: May 8, 1994 (aged 90); Los Angeles, United States
- Occupation: Sound engineer
- Years active: 1930–1978

Murray Spivack (September 6, 1903 – May 8, 1994) was an American sound engineer best known as the sound designer for the 1933 film King Kong. He won an Oscar for Sound Recording and was nominated for another in the same category. He was also a drum teacher whose students included Louie Bellson, Remo Belli, David Garibaldi, William Kraft, Alan Maitland, Jim Banks, Chad Wackerman, Josh Freese, Vinnie Colaiuta, Christiaan Oyens and Joe Morello.

== Awards ==
Spivack won an Academy Award and was nominated for another:

Won

- Hello, Dolly! (1969)

Nominated

- Tora! Tora! Tora! (1970)
