= John Cox (sound engineer) =

English sound engineer

- Born: 7 May 1908; Leicester, England
- Died: September 1972 (aged 64); London, England
- Occupation: Sound engineer
- Years active: 1931–1973 (last film released after his death)

John Cox (7 May 1908 – September 1972) was an English sound engineer. He won an Academy Award for Sound Recording and was nominated for two more in the same category. He worked on over 140 films between 1931 and 1972.

Cox was last nominated together with Bob Jones in 1969 for the British Academy Film Award in the Best Sound category, presented for the first time by the British Academy of Film and Television Arts, for the film adaptation of the Charles Dickens novel Oliver Twist, Oliver (Oliver!, 1968) by Carol Reed with Mark Lester, Ron Moody and Shani Wallis.

== Selected filmography ==
Won

- Lawrence of Arabia (1962)

Nominated

- The Guns of Navarone (1961)
- Becket (1964)
