= Tony Dawe =

British sound engineer

- Born: 26 September 1940 (age 85)
- Occupation: Sound engineer
- Years active: 1958-present

Tony Dawe (born 26 September 1940) is a British sound engineer for television and film, born in Maidenhead, Berkshire.

Since 1958, he has worked on 70 feature films, 18 films made for television, and 340 hours of television drama - including over 40 episodes of Special Branch, all 53 episodes of The Sweeney and 17 episodes (Series 4 to 7) of Inspector Morse. Before joining the film industry at Shepperton Studios in 1967, he worked as an engineer at EMI Abbey Road recording studios in 1958/60. Between 1960 and 1967 he worked for ABC Television at Teddington Studios where he was in charge of the sound dubbing suite. In the 1970s he established his own sound transfer studio, Gemini Sound Services, based in Woking.

Dawe has worked regularly with the director Tim Burton, starting with the film Batman in 1987 and continuing until Dark Shadows (2010), Miss Peregrine's Home for Peculiar Children (2016) and Dumbo (2019). He was the 1989 BAFTA Film Award winner (Best Sound) for Empire of the Sun, and the 1992 winner of the BAFTA TV Award (Best Sound, Fiction) for Inspector Morse. Dawe has been nominated for four Academy Awards in the category Best Sound.

He has been married to the glass artist Marie Dawe since 1994 and they live in Norfolk.

== Selected filmography ==
- Oliver! (1968)
- Return of the Jedi (1983)
- Empire of the Sun (1987)
- Who Framed Roger Rabbit (1988)
- Batman (1989)
- Indiana Jones and the Last Crusade (1989)
- Sense and Sensibility (1995)
- The Hours (2002)
- The Phantom of the Opera (2004)
- Troy (2004)
- Dean Spanley (2008)
- Alice in Wonderland (2010)
- Robin Hood (2010)
- Dumbo (2019)
