= A. W. Watkins =

English sound engineer

- Born: Alfred Wilfred Watkins; 1 December 1895; Kidderminster, Worcestershire, England
- Died: February 1970 (age 74); Stoke Poges, Buckinghamshire, England
- Occupation: Sound engineer
- Years active: 1930-1969

A. W. Watkins (1 December 1895 – February 1970) was an English sound engineer. He was nominated for four Academy Awards in the category Best Sound Recording.

== Selected filmography ==
- Goodbye, Mr. Chips (1939)
- Knights of the Round Table (1953)
- Libel (1959)
- Doctor Zhivago (1965)
