= Franklin Milton =

American sound engineer

- Born: Franklin Eugene Milton; August 19, 1907; Carthage, Missouri, United States
- Died: October 16, 1985 (aged 78); Agoura Hills, California, United States
- Occupation: Sound engineer
- Years active: 1933 – 1972

Franklin Milton (August 19, 1907 – October 16, 1985) was an American sound engineer. He won three Academy Awards for Sound Recording and was nominated for three more in the same category.

== Selected filmography ==
Milton won three Academy Awards and was nominated for three more:

Won

- Ben-Hur (1959)
- How the West Was Won (1962)
- Grand Prix (1966)

Nominated

- Cimarron (1960)
- The Unsinkable Molly Brown (1964)
- Doctor Zhivago (1965)
