= Richard Tyler (sound engineer) =

American sound engineer (1928–1990)

Richard Tyler (May 7, 1928 – October 24, 1990) was an American sound engineer. He has been nominated for four Academy Awards in the category Best Sound. He worked on more than 60 films between 1971 and 1989.

== Selected filmography ==
- Bite the Bullet (1975)
- Silver Streak (1976)
- Sorcerer (1977)
- Pennies from Heaven (1981)
