= John Boyd (sound engineer) =

American sound engineer

- Occupation: Sound engineer
- Years active: 1970–present

John Boyd is an American sound engineer. He was nominated for two Academy Awards in the category Best Sound.

== Selected filmography ==
- Empire of the Sun (1987)
- Who Framed Roger Rabbit (1988)
