= Daniel J. Bloomberg =

American audio engineer

- Born: July 4, 1905; Massachusetts, United States
- Died: August 14, 1984 (aged 79); Ventura, California, United States
- Occupation: Sound engineer
- Years active: 1934 – 1952

Daniel J. Bloomberg (July 4, 1905 – August 14, 1984) was an Academy Award-winning audio engineer. Bloomberg's first Hollywood credit was in 1934, his last his Oscar-nominated work on John Ford’s The Quiet Man 18 years later. In the intervening time, he worked on several films in the Dick Tracy and Zorro series.

Although his work was mainly confined to B pictures, Bloomberg did enjoy the distinction of winning five technical awards from the Academy, as well as eight Academy Award nominations. He also won an Honorary Award in 1945 for designing and building a musical scoring auditorium with state-of-the-art acoustics.

Bloomberg was married to award-winning British actress and beauty queen Eugenie Prescott Bloomberg (born: 1909, Cheshire, England, UK) whose film credits include The Rising Generation (1928), The Flying Squad (1929) and Diggers (1931).

== Selected filmography ==
Bloomberg was nominated for eight Academy Awards:

- Flying Tigers (1942) - Two categories (Best Sound and Best Effects)
- In Old Oklahoma (1943)
- Brazil (1944)
- Flame of Barbary Coast (1945)
- Moonrise (1948)
- Sands of Iwo Jima (1949)
- The Quiet Man (1952)
