= Charles L. Lootens =

American sound engineer

- Born: Charles Louis Lootens; May 14, 1900
- Died: May 10, 1994 (aged 93); Denver, Colorado, United States
- Occupation: Sound engineer
- Years active: 1937-1942

Charles L. Lootens (May 14, 1900 – May 10, 1994) was an American sound engineer. He was nominated for four Academy Awards in the category Best Sound Recording.

== Selected filmography ==
- Army Girl (1938)
- Man of Conquest (1939)
- Behind the News (1940)
- The Devil Pays Off (1941)
