= James R. Alexander =

American sound engineer (1930–2019)

- Born: James Riley Alexander; September 3, 1930; Los Angeles, California
- Died: August 19, 2019 (aged 88); Woodland Hills, California
- Occupation: Sound engineer
- Years active: 1956–1993

James Riley Alexander (September 3, 1930 – August 19, 2019) was an American sound engineer.

Alexander was born in Los Angeles, California and served in the United States Army as a communications specialist. Alexander was commissioned a sergeant. He was nominated for two Academy Awards in the Category Best Sound.

== Selected filmography ==
- Coal Miner's Daughter (1980)
- Terms of Endearment (1983)
