= Michael Herbick =

American sound engineer

- Occupation: Sound engineer
- Years active: 1988-present

Michael Herbick is an American sound engineer. He has been nominated for five Academy Awards in the category Best Sound. He has worked on over 90 films since 1988.

== Selected filmography ==
- The Fugitive (1993)
- Clear and Present Danger (1994)
- The Shawshank Redemption (1994)
- Batman Forever (1995)
- The Green Mile (1999)
