= Franklin Hansen =

American sound engineer

- Born: Franklin Hansen; May 2, 1897
- Died: January 13, 1982 (aged 84)
- Occupation: Sound engineer
- Years active: 1928-1961

Franklin Hansen (May 2, 1897 – January 13, 1982) was an American sound engineer. He won an Academy Award in the category of Sound Recording for 1932's A Farewell to Arms and was nominated for four more in the same category.

== Selected filmography ==
Hansen won an Academy Award and was nominated for four more in the category Best Sound:

Won

- A Farewell to Arms (1932)

Nominated

- The Love Parade (1930)
- Cleopatra (1934)
- The Lives of a Bengal Lancer (1935)
- The Texas Rangers (1936)
