= Ed Novick =

American sound engineer

- Occupation: Sound engineer
- Years active: 1982-present

Ed Novick is an American sound engineer. He has won an Academy Award for Best Sound and has been nominated for another three in the same category. He has worked on more than 60 films since 1982.

== Selected filmography ==
Novick has won an Academy Award and has been nominated for another three:

Won

- Inception (2010)

Nominated

- Spider-Man (2002)
- The Dark Knight (2008)
- Moneyball (2011)
