= Waldon O. Watson =

American sound engineer

- Born: January 20, 1907; Los Angeles, California, United States
- Died: August 15, 1986 (aged 79); Fullerton, California, United States
- Occupation: Sound engineer
- Years active: 1948-1973

Waldon O. Watson (January 20, 1907 – August 15, 1986) was an American sound engineer. He was nominated for six Academy Awards in the category Sound Recording. He worked on nearly 150 films between 1948 and 1973.

== Selected filmography ==
- Flower Drum Song (1961)
- That Touch of Mink (1962)
- Captain Newman, M.D. (1963)
- Father Goose (1964)
- Shenandoah (1965)
- Gambit (1966)
