= Les Lazarowitz =

Sound engineer

- Born: Leslie Lazarowitz; October 2, 1941
- Died: January 6, 2017 (aged 75); Florida, U.S.
- Occupation: Sound engineer
- Years active: 1971–1999

Leslie Lazarowitz (October 2, 1941 – January 6, 2017) was an American sound engineer. He was nominated for two Academy Awards in the category Best Sound for Raging Bull and Tootsie. Lazarowitz died from cancer on January 6, 2017, in Florida. He was 75.

His life began in Williamsburg, Brooklyn, New York. He studied at Brooklyn College, and started work as a photographer's assistant in the early 1960s. He soon was working in several roles at a commercial television studio, including editing.

Throughout his career, Les Lazarowitz worked his way up to production sound mixer until his retirement in the late 1990s. He has worked with many directors including Martin Scorsese, John Badham, Sidney Pollack, Mike Nichols, Jonathan Demme, Penny Marshall, James Toback, and Brian De Palma. His film credits began in 1969 with Midnight Cowboy up through Don't Drink the Water in 1994.

== Selected filmography ==
- Taxi Driver (1976)
- Raging Bull (1980)
- Tootsie (1982)
- Carlito's Way (1993)
- Groundhog Day (1993)
