= Walt Martin =

American production sound mixer

- Born: April 8, 1945
- Died: July 24, 2014 (aged 69); Burbank, California, U.S.
- Occupation: Production sound mixer
- Years active: 1984–2014

Walt Martin (April 8, 1945 – July 24, 2014) was an American production sound mixer. He was nominated for Academy Awards in the category Best Sound Mixing for the 2006 film Flags of Our Fathers and the 2014 film American Sniper. He worked on more than 70 films. He died of vasculitis on July 24, 2014, aged 69. His final film, American Sniper, was released posthumously.

== Selected filmography ==
- Space Cowboys (1999)
- Charlie's Angels (2000)
- Blood Work (2002)
- The Banger Sisters (2002)
- A Man Apart (2003)
- Mystic River (2003)
- Eulogy (2004)
- Million Dollar Baby (2004)
- Flags of Our Fathers (2006)
- Hollywoodland (2006)
- Letters from Iwo Jima (2006)
- Changeling (2008)
- Gran Torino (2008)
- Invictus (2009)
- Hereafter (2010)
- Trouble with the Curve (2012)
- Jersey Boys (2014)
- American Sniper (2014)
