= Jay M. Harding =

American sound engineer

- Occupation: Sound engineer
- Years active: 1966-1991

Jay M. Harding is an American sound engineer. He was nominated for two Academy Awards in the category Best Sound.

== Selected filmography ==
- Fame (1980)
- Pennies from Heaven (1981)
