= Gloria Borders =

American sound editor

- Other name: Gloria S. Borders
- Occupation: sound effects editor
- Years active: 1982-present

Gloria Borders is a sound effects editor, best known for Terminator 2: Judgment Day for which she won an Oscar as well for Best Sound Editing. She was also the General Manager for Skywalker Sound.

Borders attended Moorestown Friends School.

== Oscar history ==
Both film were for Best Sound Editing.

- 1991 Academy Awards-Terminator 2: Judgment Day. Award shared with Gary Rydstrom. Won.
- 1994 Academy Awards-Forrest Gump. Nomination shared with Randy Thom. Lost to Speed.

== Selected filmography ==
- TRON: Legacy (2010) (visual effects executive producer)
- Titan A.E. (2000) (Skywalker post-production liaison)
- Forrest Gump (1994) (supervising sound editor)
- Mrs. Doubtfire (1993) (supervising sound editor)
- Terminator 2: Judgment Day (1991)
- Driving Miss Daisy (1989)
- Tucker: The Man and His Dream (1988)
- Ewoks: The Battle for Endor (1985)
- The Ewok Adventure (1984)
- Indiana Jones and the Temple of Doom (1984)
- Return of the Jedi (1983)
- The Right Stuff (1983) (stock footage researcher)
