= Tom Beckert =

American sound engineer

- Born: Thomas Austin Beckert; December 6, 1926
- Died: September 13, 2017 (aged 90)
- Occupation: Sound engineer
- Years active: 1976-1991

Thomas Austin Beckert (December 6, 1926 – September 13, 2017) was an American sound engineer. He was nominated for two Academy Awards in the category Best Sound.

== Selected filmography ==
- The Deep (1977)
- The Witches of Eastwick (1987)
