= Carlos Delarios =

American sound engineer

- Occupation: Sound engineer
- Years active: 1980–2008

Carlos Delarios is an American sound engineer. He has been nominated for four Academy Awards in the category Best Sound. He worked on 130 films from 1980 to 2008.

== Selected filmography ==
- WarGames (1983)
- 2010: The Year We Make Contact (1984)
- RoboCop (1987)
- Total Recall (1990)
