= John Aldred (sound engineer) =

English sound engineer (1921–2020)

- Born: August 1921; Doncaster, England
- Died: 15 December 2020 (aged 99); Worthing, West Sussex, England
- Occupation: Sound engineer
- Years active: 1942–1986

John Brian Aldred (August 1921 – 15 December 2020) was an English sound engineer. He was nominated for two Academy Awards in the category Sound Recording. He worked on 57 different films and TV shows from 1942 to 1973. He retired in 1986.

Aldred died in Worthing, West Sussex in December 2020 at the age of 99.

== Selected filmography ==
- Anne of the Thousand Days (1969)
- Mary, Queen of Scots (1971)
