= Robert Bratton (sound editor) =

American sound editor

- Born: September 26, 1918
- Died: April 29, 2008 (aged 89); Santa Clara, California
- Other names: Robert L. Bratton; Bob Bratton
- Occupation: Sound editor
- Years active: 1954–1964

Robert Bratton (September 26, 1918 – April 29, 2008) was an American sound editor who was nominated twice at the Academy Awards for Best Sound Editing.

== Oscar nominations ==
- 1963 Academy Awards-Nominated for A Gathering of Eagles. Lost to It's a Mad, Mad, Mad, Mad World.
- 1964 Academy Awards-Nominated for The Lively Set. Lost to Goldfinger.
