= David M. Ronne =

American sound engineer

- Born: April 23, 1943; Chicago, Illinois, United States
- Died: January 23, 2007 (aged 63); Los Angeles, California, United States
- Occupation: Sound engineer
- Years active: 1966-2007

David M. Ronne (April 23, 1943 – January 23, 2007) was an American sound engineer. He was nominated for three Academy Awards in the category Best Sound. He worked on more than 120 films between 1966 and 2007.

== Selected filmography ==
- On Golden Pond (1981)
- The River (1984)
- Silverado (1985)
