= William A. Mueller =

American sound engineer

- Born: January 17, 1901; Elmwood, Nebraska, United States
- Died: May 11, 1992 (aged 91); Newport Beach, California, USA
- Occupation: Sound engineer
- Years active: 1927-1957

William Archibald Mueller (January 17, 1901 – May 11, 1992) was an American sound engineer. He was head of the sound department of Warner Bros. during the 1950s and was nominated for two Academy Awards in the category Sound Recording.

== Biography ==
Born in Nebraska, Mueller went to the University of Nebraska and obtained a degree in electrical engineering in 1922. He became a research engineer for Western Electric in New York City, which later became Bell Telephone Laboratories. At Bell Labs, he worked on technology that was licensed by Warner Bros. and he went to Hollywood, helping to develop the Vitaphone sound-on-disc system while working on The Jazz Singer (1927), the first feature-length motion picture with not only a synchronized recorded music score but also lip-synchronous singing and speech in several isolated sequences.

He carried on working for Warner Bros., installing sound systems in movie theaters on the West Coast, and eventually became the head of the sound department where he received two nominations for the Academy Award for Best Sound Recording for Calamity Jane (1953) and Mister Roberts (1955).

After leaving Warner Bros. in the late 1950s, he went to work for Hughes Aircraft, the United States Department of State and the United States Air Force, making training films, including for the Indonesian government. He retired in 1964.

He had a son and two daughters. He died in his sleep in 1992 at home in Newport Beach, California at the age of 91.
