= Edmund H. Hansen =

American sound engineer

- Born: November 13, 1894; Springfield, Illinois, United States
- Died: October 10, 1962 (aged 67); Orange, California, United States
- Occupation: Sound engineer
- Years active: 1928-1944

Edmund H. Hansen (November 13, 1894 – October 10, 1962) was an American sound engineer. He won two Academy Awards; one for Best Sound Recording and the other Best Visual Effects. He was nominated for another 12 films across the two categories.

== Filmography ==
=== Best Sound Recording ===
Won

- Wilson (1944)

Nominated

- The White Parade (1934)
- Thanks a Million (1935)
- Banjo on My Knee (1936)
- In Old Chicago (1937)
- Suez (1938)
- The Rains Came (1940)
- The Grapes of Wrath (1940)
- How Green Was My Valley (1941)
- This Above All (1942)
- The Song of Bernadette (1943)

=== Best Visual Effects ===
Won

- The Rains Came (1940)

Nominated

- The Blue Bird (1940)
- A Yank in the R.A.F. (1941)
