= Harry W. Tetrick =

American sound engineer

- Born: May 6, 1911
- Died: March 17, 1977 (aged 65); Solana Beach, California, United States
- Occupation: Sound engineer
- Years active: 1966-1976

Harry W. Tetrick (May 6, 1911 – March 17, 1977) was an American sound engineer. He was nominated for three Academy Awards in the category Best Sound.

== Selected filmography ==
- The Wind and the Lion (1975)
- Rocky (1976)
- King Kong (1976)
