= Charles Grenzbach =

American sound engineer (1923–2004)

- Born: December 29, 1923; New York City, New York, United States
- Died: March 29, 2004 (aged 80); Palm Desert, California, United States
- Occupation: Sound engineer
- Years active: 1956–1989

Charles Grenzbach (December 29, 1923 – March 29, 2004) was an American sound engineer. He won an Academy Award for Best Sound and was nominated for two more in the same category. He worked on more than 130 films between 1956 and 1989.

== Selected filmography ==
Grenzbach won an Academy Award and was nominated for two more:

Won

- Platoon (1986)

Nominated

- The Godfather (1972)
- Chinatown (1974)
