= Rick Kline =

American sound engineer

- Occupation: Sound engineer
- Years active: 1978–present

Rick Kline is an American sound engineer. He has been nominated for eleven Academy Awards in the category Best Sound. He has worked on more than 220 films since 1978.

== Selected filmography ==
- Terms of Endearment (1983)
- Silverado (1985)
- Top Gun (1986)
- Mississippi Burning (1988)
- Days of Thunder (1990)
- A Few Good Men (1992)
- Crimson Tide (1995)
- Air Force One (1997)
- The Mummy (1999)
- U-571 (2000)
- Memoirs of a Geisha (2005)
