= The White Parade =

1934 film by Irving Cummings

- Swedish Theatrical release poster
- Directed by: Irving Cummings
- Written by: Rian James (novel)/(screenplay); Jesse L. Lasky Jr. Sonya Levien; Ernest Pascal
- Produced by: Jesse L. Lasky
- Starring: Loretta Young; John Boles
- Cinematography: Arthur C. Miller
- Music by: Louis De Francesco
- Distributed by: Fox Film Corporation
- Release date: November 16, 1934 (U.S.)
- Running time: 80 minutes
- Country: United States
- Language: English

The White Parade is a 1934 film directed by Irving Cummings and starring Loretta Young and John Boles. The screenplay was written by Rian James, Jesse Lasky Jr., Sonya Levien, and Ernest Pascal, based on the novel by Rian James.

Dedicated to "the memory of Florence Nightingale," the film follows the challenges and romances of young women training to become nurses. It received a nomination for the Academy Award for Best Picture.

The only known surviving print is held at the UCLA Film Archive. The print is in poor condition, with several frames misaligned and the overall image appearing faded and blurry. Additionally, near the film's conclusion, a "reel 7" title card briefly appears.

== Plot ==
In 1907, June Arden enrolls at the Mitchell-Reed School for Nurses with the ambition of following in the footsteps of Florence Nightingale. She shares a room with Zita Scofield, who struggles with homesickness. June mentions her acquaintance with Ronald Hall III, a wealthy polo player, a relationship later confirmed by Ronald's secretary.

After six months of study, the students pass their first examination and begin practical training at a nearby hospital. Despite the demanding workload, Gertrude Mack, one of the students, frequently interferes in others' affairs. When Gertrude learns that Ronald will visit the city, she inquires if June plans to meet him. June meets Ronald at the train station, and they soon develop a genuine romantic relationship.

During the course, June faces difficulties balancing her studies with her relationship. After a disagreement over June's nursing career, Ronald is involved in a car accident and recuperates at the hospital where June works. June requests a shift change to care for him but ultimately chooses to attend to a terminally ill patient instead.

Two weeks before the final exams, Zita is reprimanded for slow performance and, following a conflict with her boyfriend Dr. Jim Moore, attempts suicide with anesthetics. June, responsible for the anesthesia keys, had temporarily entrusted them to another staff member. Zita is saved by surgeon Dr. Thorne, who, alongside head nurse Sailor Roberts, advocates for June to remain enrolled despite the incident. The school principal permits June to continue and take the final examination.

On graduation day, Gertrude apologizes to June for previous behavior. June's relationship with Ronald ends after he insists she abandon her nursing career upon marriage. June affirms her dedication to nursing, a decision supported by Dr. Thorne.

== Cast ==
- Loretta Young as June Arden
- John Boles as Ronald Hall III
- Dorothy Wilson as Zita Scofield
- Muriel Kirkland as Glenda Farley
- Astrid Allwyn as Gertrude Mack
- Frank Conroy as Dr. Thorne
- Jane Darwell as Miss 'Sailor' Roberts
- Sara Haden as Miss Harrington
- Joyce Compton as Una Mellon
- June Gittelson as Lou 'Pudgy' Stebbins
- Polly Ann Young as Hannah Seymour
- Noel Francis as Nurse Clare
- Shirley Palmer as Telephone Operator

== Reception ==
The film was a success at the box office.

== Awards ==
The White Parade was nominated for the Best Picture Oscar in 1934. Loretta Young also appeared in The House of Rothschild the same year, which was also nominated for the Academy Award for Best Picture. The film was also nominated in the category Sound Recording (Edmund H. Hansen).
