= Bill W. Benton =

American sound engineer

- Occupation: Sound engineer
- Years active: 1980–present

Bill W. Benton is an American sound engineer. He won an Academy Award for Best Sound and has been nominated for two more in the same category. He has worked on more than 110 films since 1980.

== Selected filmography ==
Benton won an Academy Award for Best Sound and has been nominated for another two:

Won

- Dances with Wolves (1990)

Nominated

- Geronimo: An American Legend (1993)
- Independence Day (1996)
