= Herman Lewis =

American sound engineer

- Born: Herman Levy; November 10, 1910
- Died: February 28, 2001 (aged 90)
- Occupation: Sound engineer
- Years active: 1949-1982

Herman Lewis (November 10, 1910 – February 28, 2001) was an American sound engineer. He was nominated for three Academy Awards in the category Best Sound.

== Selected filmography ==
- Tora! Tora! Tora! (1970)
- The Poseidon Adventure (1972)
- The Towering Inferno (1974)
