= Douglas Williams (sound engineer) =

American sound engineer

- Born: July 29, 1917
- Died: January 31, 1993 (aged 75)
- Occupation: Sound engineer
- Years active: 1965 – 1984

Douglas O. Williams (July 29, 1917 – January 31, 1993) was an American sound engineer. He won an Academy Award for Best Sound and was nominated for three more in the same category.

== Selected filmography ==
Williams won an Academy Award and was nominated for three more:

Won

- Patton (1970)

Nominated

- Silver Streak (1976)
- The Turning Point (1977)
- The Rose (1979)
