= Curly Thirlwell =

American sound engineer

- Born: Edward Thirlwell; November 18, 1905
- Died: December 2, 1985 (aged 80)
- Occupation: Sound engineer
- Years active: 1970–1978

Edward "Curly" Thirlwell (November 18, 1905 – December 2, 1985) was an American sound engineer. He has been nominated for two Academy Awards in the category Best Sound.

== Selected filmography ==
- The Godfather (1972) Sound effects re-recordist (uncredited)
- Funny Lady (1975)
- The Buddy Holly Story (1978)
