= Kirk Francis (sound engineer) =

American sound engineer (1947–2026)

- Francis in 2008
- Born: August 27, 1947; Oakland, California, U.S.
- Died: February 8, 2026 (aged 78)
- Occupation: Sound engineer
- Years active: 1972–2014

Kirk H. Francis (August 27, 1947 – February 8, 2026) was an American sound engineer. He won the 2008 Academy Award for The Bourne Ultimatum, and for LA Confidential he also received an Academy Award nomination in 1998. He was on the crew for the 1973 film Executive Action.

Francis died on February 8, 2026, at the age of 78.

At the 98th Academy Awards, his name was mentioned in the In Memoriam section.
