= John T. Reitz =

American re-recording mixer

- Occupation: Re-recording mixer
- Years active: 1976–present

John T. Reitz is an American re-recording mixer. He won an Oscar for Best Sound and was nominated for another four in the same category. He has worked on more than 180 films since 1976.

== Selected filmography ==
Reitz won an Academy Award for Best Sound and was nominated for another four in the same category:

Won

- The Matrix (1999)

Nominated

- Days of Heaven (1978)
- The Perfect Storm (2000)
- Flags of Our Fathers (2006)
- Argo (2012)
- American Sniper (2014)
