= Barry Thomas (sound engineer) =

Sound engineer

- Born: June 8, 1932; Hollywood, California
- Died: October 4, 2017 (aged 85); Sandpoint, Idaho
- Occupation: Sound engineer
- Years active: 1966-1999

Barry Dean Thomas (June 8, 1932 – October 4, 2017) was an American sound engineer. He was nominated for an Academy Award in the category Best Sound for the film Days of Heaven.

== Selected filmography ==
- Days of Heaven (1978)
