= John O. Aalberg =

American audio engineer (1897–1984)

- Born: April 3, 1897; Chicago, Illinois, United States
- Died: August 30, 1984 (aged 87); Los Angeles County, California, United States
- Occupation: Sound engineer
- Years active: 1933 – 1957
- Spouse: Sara Jane Moore

John O. Aalberg (April 3, 1897 – August 30, 1984) was a Hollywood sound technician. He was the head of the sound department at RKO Pictures from the early 1930s until the 1950s. Some of the film he worked on included Citizen Kane and It's a Wonderful Life. He was a ten-time Oscar nominee, and received three technical awards from the Academy of Motion Picture Arts and Sciences.

Aalberg was also married to Sara Jane Moore, who tried to assassinate President Gerald Ford. They had one child named Fredric W. Aalborg.

== Filmography ==
Aalberg was nominated for ten Academy Awards:

- That Girl from Paris (1936)
- Hitting a New High (1937)
- Vivacious Lady (1938)
- The Hunchback of Notre Dame (1939)
- Kitty Foyle: The Natural History of a Woman (1940)
- Swiss Family Robinson (1940)
- Citizen Kane (1941)
- It's a Wonderful Life (1946)
- Two Tickets to Broadway (1951)
- Susan Slept Here (1954)
