= Gordon E. Sawyer =

American sound engineer

- Born: August 27, 1905; Santa Barbara, California, United States
- Died: May 15, 1980 (aged 74); Santa Barbara, California, United States
- Occupation: Sound engineer
- Years active: 1930 – 1968

Gordon E. Sawyer (27 August 1905 – 15 May 1980) was sound director at Samuel Goldwyn Productions. He won 3 Oscars for Best Sound and was nominated a further 13 times.

== Selected filmography ==
Sawyer won three Academy Awards and was nominated for 13 more:

Won

- The Bishop's Wife (1947)
- The Alamo (1960)
- West Side Story (1961)

Nominated

- Wonder Man (1945)
- The Best Years of Our Lives (1946)
- Our Very Own (1950)
- I Want You (1951)
- Hans Christian Andersen (1952)
- Friendly Persuasion (1956)
- Witness for the Prosecution (1957)
- I Want to Live! (1958)
- Porgy and Bess (1959)
- The Apartment (1960)
- The Loudest Whisper (1961)
- It's a Mad, Mad, Mad, Mad World (1963)
- Hawaii (1966)

== Legacy ==
The Gordon E. Sawyer award was instituted at the Academy Awards in 1981 *Gordon E. Sawyer Award
