= Leslie I. Carey =

- Born: Leslie Irwin Carey; August 3, 1895; Innisfail, Alberta, Canada
- Died: June 17, 1984 (aged 88); Los Angeles, California, United States
- Occupation: Sound engineer
- Years active: 1947 – 1960

Sound recordist Leslie I. Carey (August 3, 1895 – June 17, 1984) first hit Hollywood in 1938, where he embarked on the first of over 300 films. Some of these were A Double Life in 1947, The Naked City and Abbott and Costello Meet Frankenstein in 1948, Winchester '73 in 1950, Creature from the Black Lagoon and Magnificent Obsession in 1954, Man Without a Star and This Island Earth in 1955, The Incredible Shrinking Man (1957) and Operation Petticoat (1959). Also in the late 1950s, he worked extensively on the "Peter Gunn" TV series. Nominated six times for the Academy Awards, he won an Oscar in 1954 for The Glenn Miller Story.

== Awards ==
Carey was nominated for six Academy Awards and won one:

- Once More, My Darling (1949)
- Louisa (1950)
- Bright Victory (1951)
- The Mississippi Gambler (1953)
- The Glenn Miller Story (1954)
- A Time to Love and a Time to Die (1958)
