= Robin Gregory =

- Born: 1936; Chester, Cheshire, England
- Died: 2004 (aged 67–68); Truro, Cornwall, England
- Occupation: Sound engineer
- Years active: 1964-1989

Robin Marshall Gregory (1936 – 2004) was an English sound engineer. He was nominated for two Academy Awards in the category Best Sound.

== Selected filmography ==
- The Deep (1977)
- Outland (1981)
