= Robert Thirlwell =

American sound engineer

- Occupation: Sound engineer
- Years active: 1978 – 1998

Robert Thirlwell is an American sound engineer. He was nominated for three Academy Awards in the category Best Sound.

== Selected filmography ==
- Outland (1981)
- The River (1984)
- Back to the Future (1985)
