= 50th Academy Awards =

- Official poster
- Date: April 3, 1978
- Site: Dorothy Chandler Pavilion, Los Angeles, California, U.S.
- Hosted by: Bob Hope
- Produced by: Howard W. Koch
- Directed by: Marty Pasetta

Highlights
- Best Picture: Annie Hall
- Most awards: Star Wars (6)
- Most nominations: Julia and The Turning Point (11)

TV in the United States
- Network: ABC
- Duration: 2 hours, 55 minutes
- Ratings: 48.5 million 36.3% (Nielsen ratings)

The 50th Academy Awards ceremony, presented by the Academy of Motion Picture Arts and Sciences (AMPAS), honored films released in 1977 and took place on April 3, 1978, at the Dorothy Chandler Pavilion in Los Angeles. During the ceremony, AMPAS presented Academy Awards (commonly referred to as Oscars) in 22 categories. The ceremony, televised in the United States by ABC, was produced by Howard W. Koch and directed by Marty Pasetta. Actor and comedian Bob Hope hosted the show for the 19th time. He first presided over the 12th ceremony held in 1940 and had last served as a co-host of the 47th ceremony held in 1975. Five days earlier, in a ceremony held at The Beverly Hilton in Beverly Hills, California, on March 29, the Academy Scientific and Technical Awards were presented by hosts Kirk Douglas and Gregory Peck.

Annie Hall won four awards, including Best Picture. Other winners included Star Wars with six awards, Julia with three, and Close Encounters of the Third Kind, The Goodbye Girl, Gravity Is My Enemy, I'll Find a Way, A Little Night Music, Madame Rosa, The Sand Castle, Who Are the DeBolts? And Where Did They Get Nineteen Kids?, and You Light Up My Life with one. In addition, Close Encounters of the Third Kind and Star Wars were each presented with an additional Special Award. The telecast garnered 48.5 million viewers in the United States.

== Winners and nominees ==
The nominees for the 50th Academy Awards were announced on February 21, 1978. Julia and The Turning Point tied for the most nominations with eleven each. The winners were announced during the awards ceremony on April 3. Woody Allen became the first person to receive nominations for acting, directing, and screenwriting for the same film since Orson Welles, who previously achieved this feat for 1941's Citizen Kane. With its eleven nominations and zero wins, The Turning Point was the most nominated film in Oscar history without a win. (Note: The Color Purple later equaled this record with eleven nominations and no wins, in 1986.) Vanessa Redgrave became the first performer to win in a supporting acting category for playing a titular role (via Julia). United Artists became the first studio to win Best Picture for a third consecutive year.

=== Awards ===
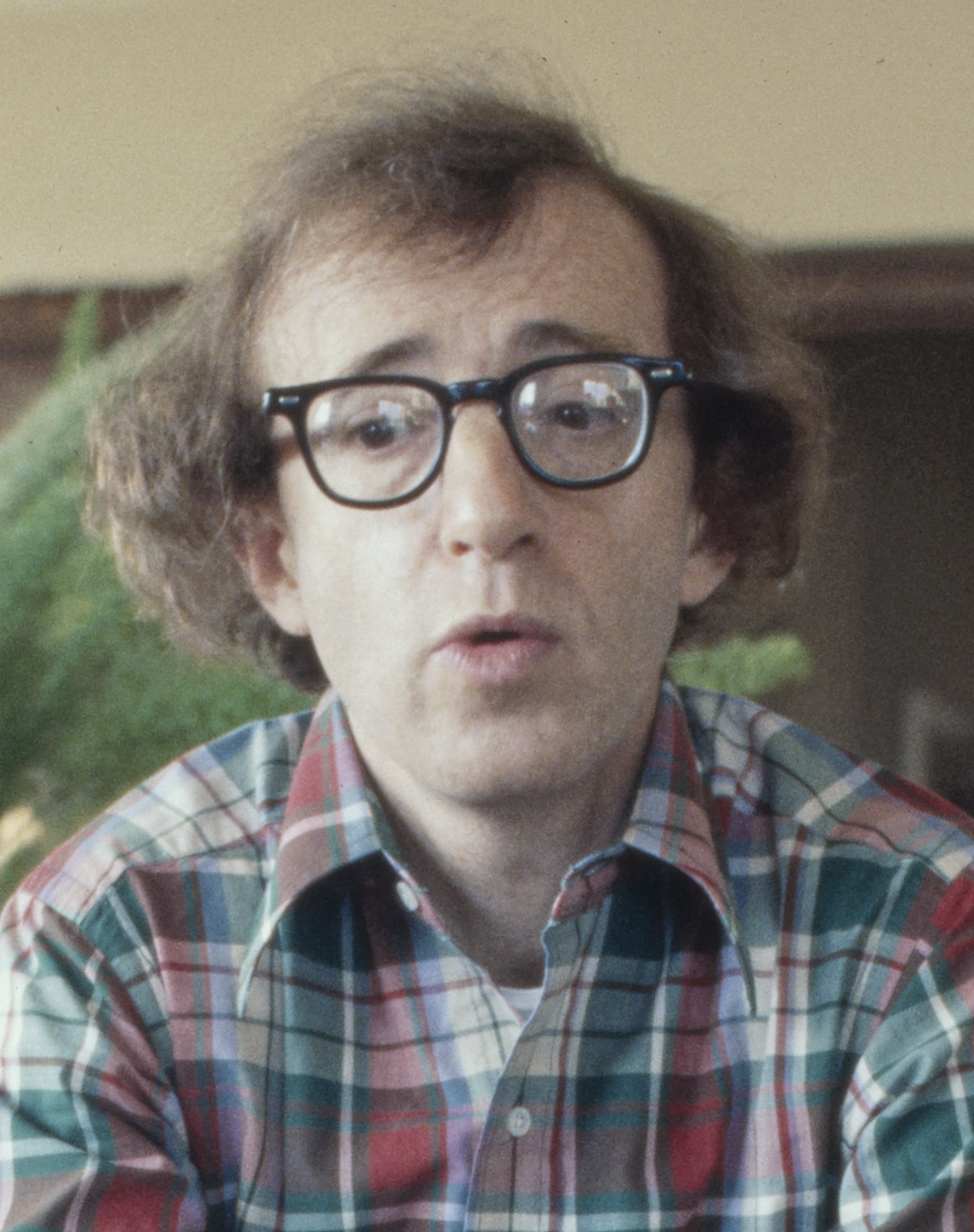
Woody Allen, Best Director winner and Best Original Screenplay co-winner

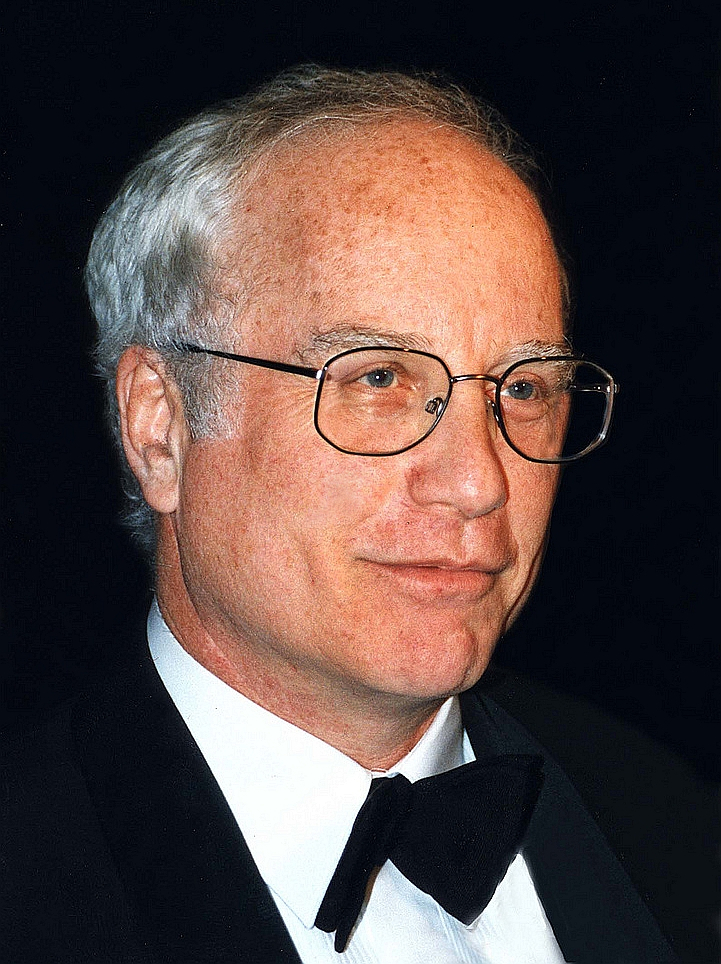
Richard Dreyfuss, Best Actor winner

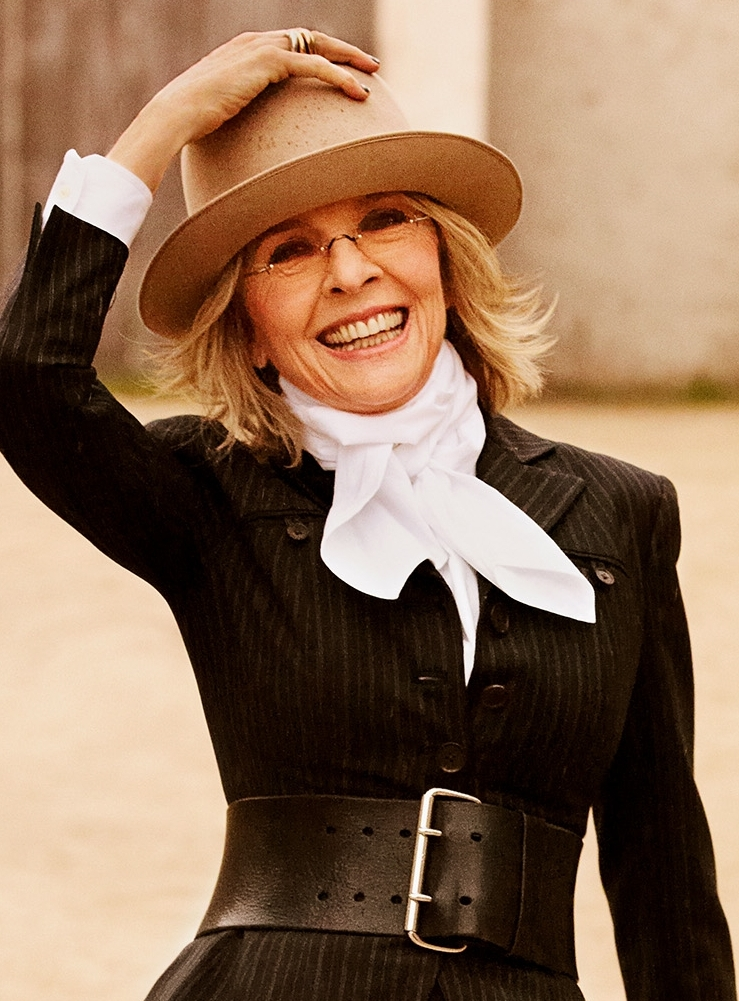
Diane Keaton, Best Actress winner

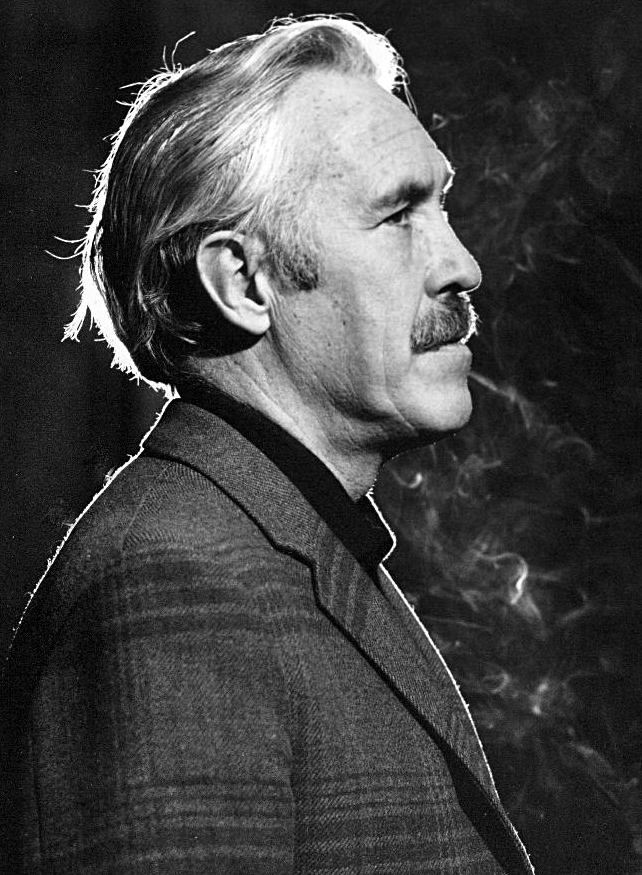
Jason Robards, Best Supporting Actor winner

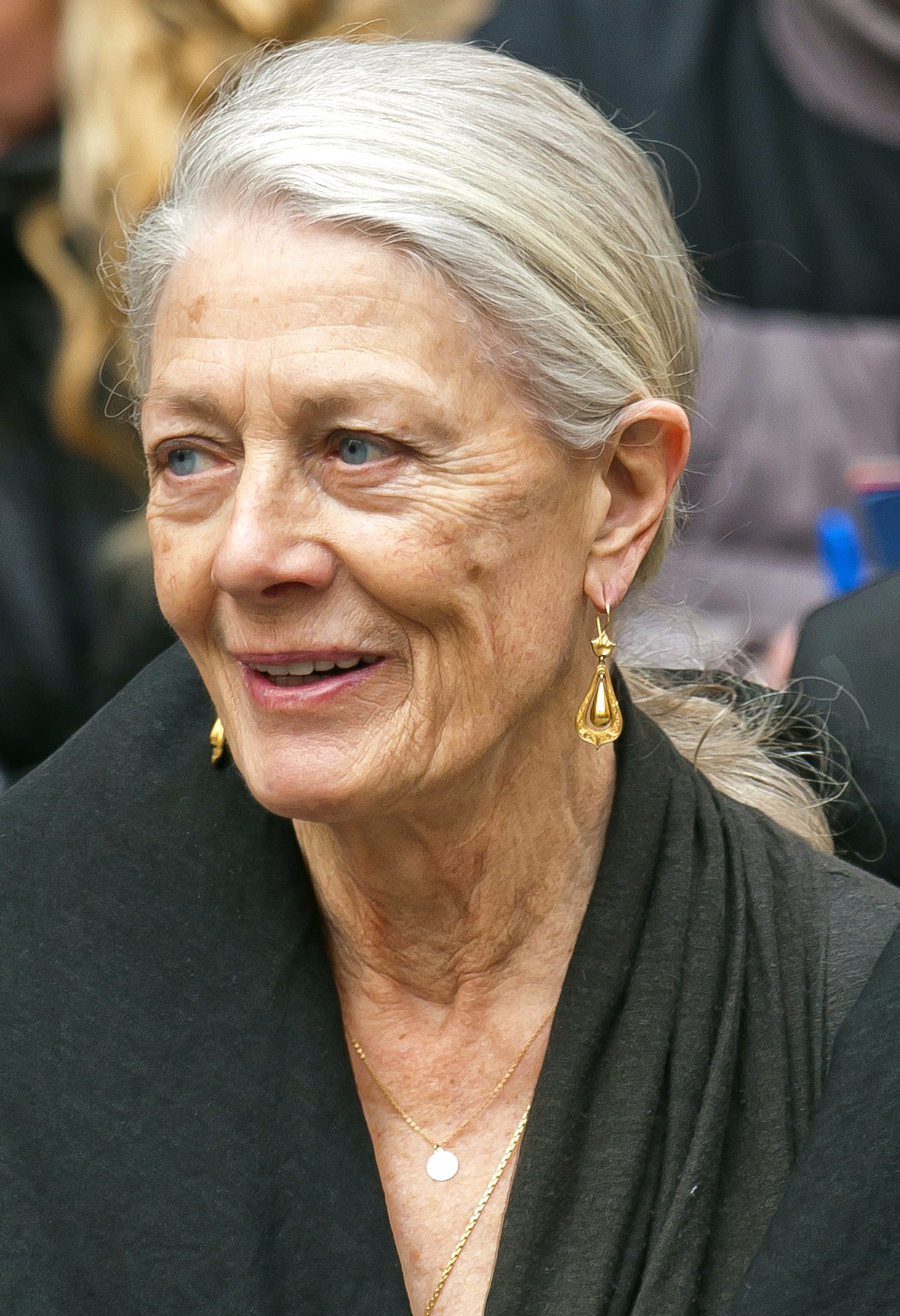
Vanessa Redgrave, Best Supporting Actress winner

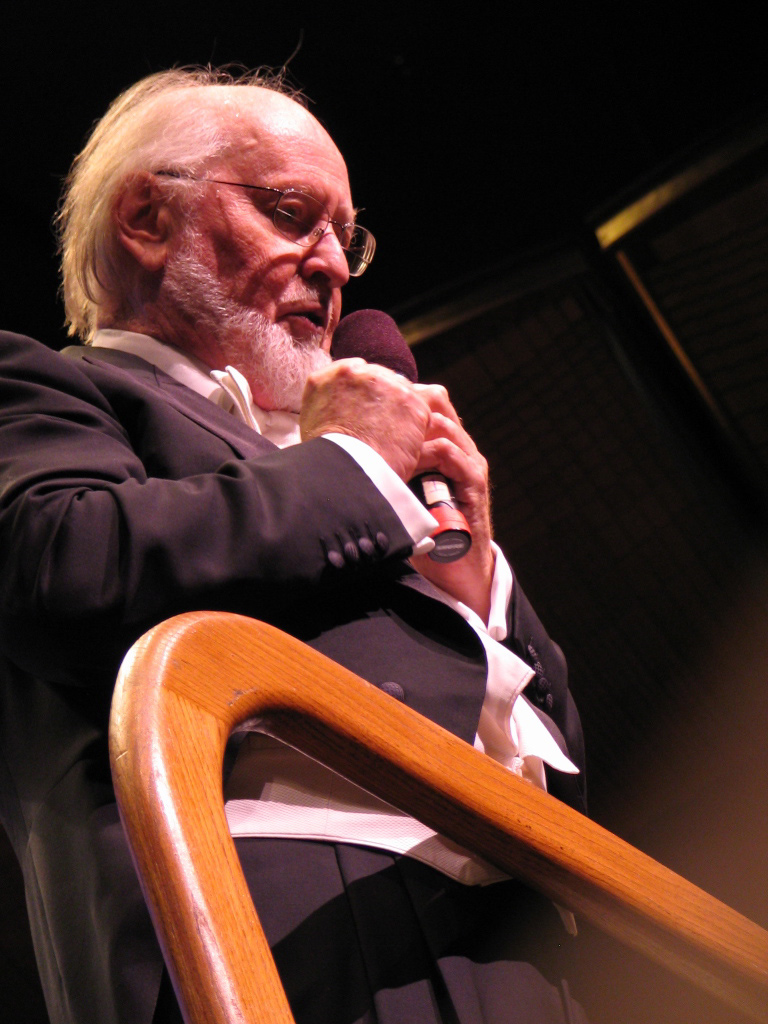
John Williams, Best Original Score winner

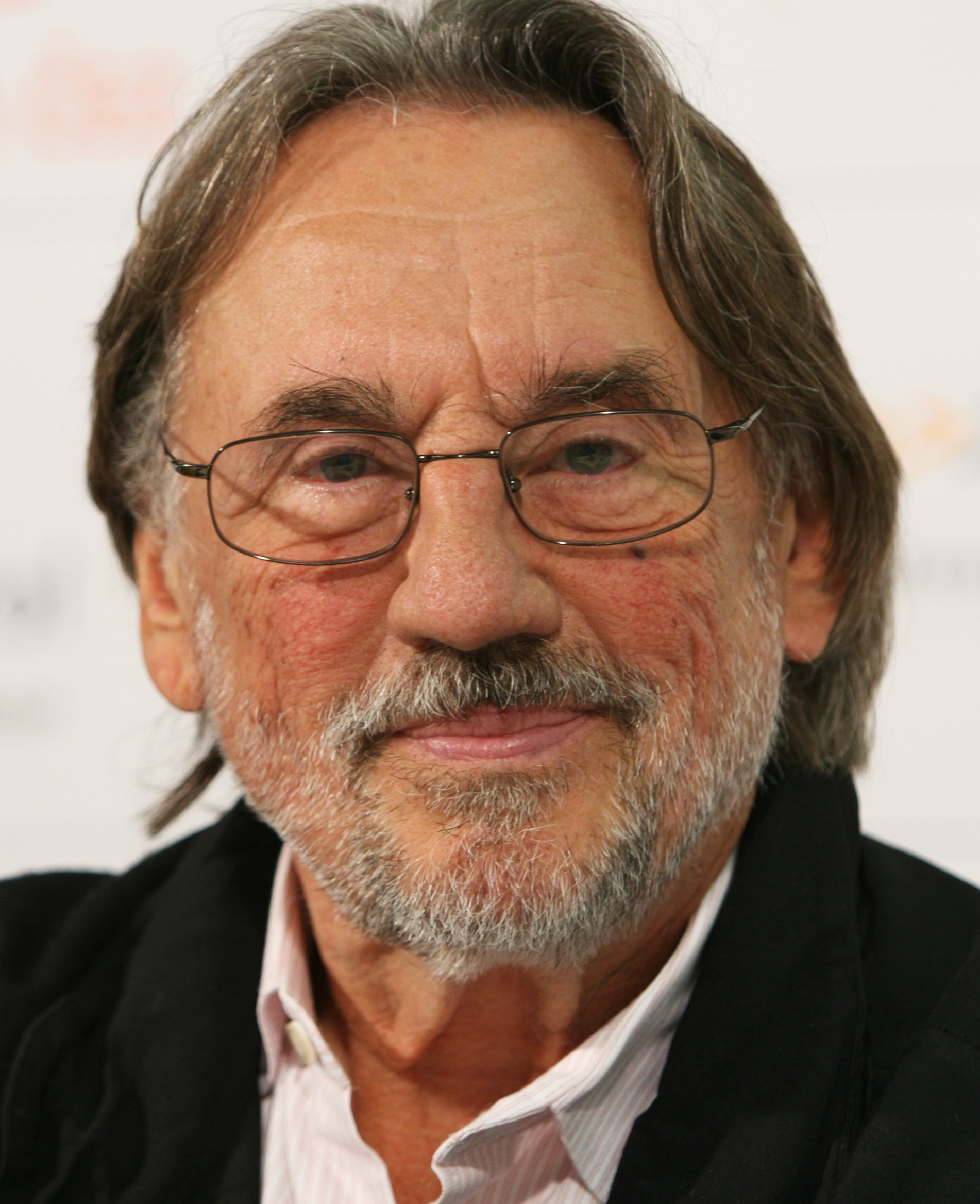
Vilmos Zsigmond, Best Cinematography winner

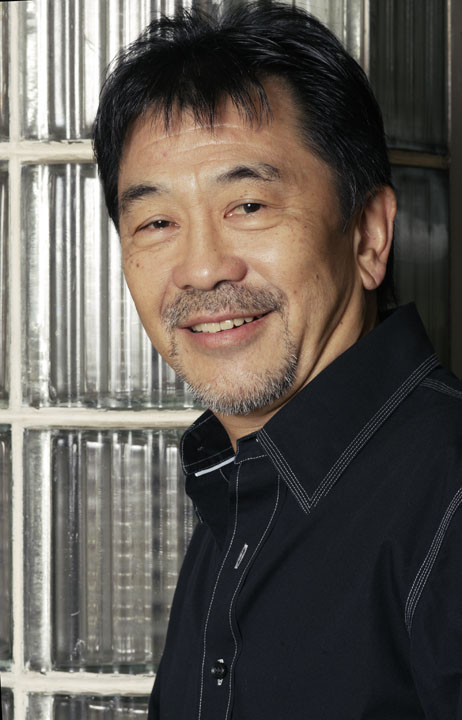
Richard Chew, Best Film Editing co-winner

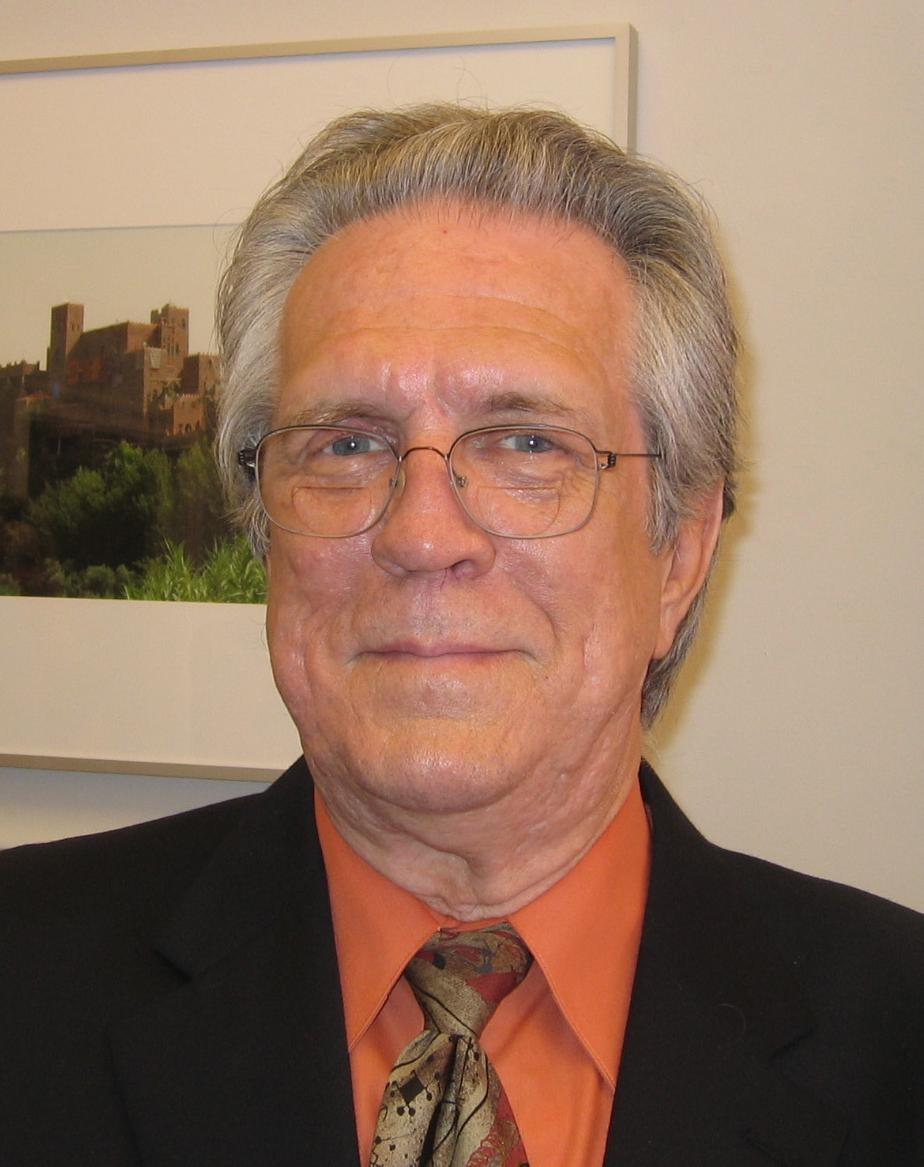
Richard Edlund, Best Visual Effects co-winner

Winners are listed first, highlighted in boldface and indicated with a double dagger (‡).

Table featuring winners and nominees of the 50th Academy Awards
| **Best Picture**: **Annie Hall – Charles H. Joffe, producer**‡; The Goodbye Girl – Ray Stark, producer; Julia – Richard Roth, producer; Star Wars – Gary Kurtz, producer; The Turning Point – Herbert Ross and Arthur Laurents, producers | **Best Directing**: **Woody Allen – Annie Hall**‡; Steven Spielberg – Close Encounters of the Third Kind; Fred Zinnemann – Julia; George Lucas – Star Wars; Herbert Ross – The Turning Point |
| **Best Actor in a Leading Role**: **Richard Dreyfuss – The Goodbye Girl as Elliot Garfield**‡; Woody Allen – Annie Hall as Alvy Singer; Richard Burton – Equus as Doctor Martin Dysart; Marcello Mastroianni – A Special Day as Gabriele; John Travolta – Saturday Night Fever as Anthony "Tony" Manero | **Best Actress in a Leading Role**: **Diane Keaton – Annie Hall as Annie Hall**‡; Anne Bancroft – The Turning Point as Emma Jacklin; Jane Fonda – Julia as Lillian Hellman; Shirley MacLaine – The Turning Point as DeeDee Rodgers; Marsha Mason – The Goodbye Girl as Paula McFadden |
| **Best Actor in a Supporting Role**: **Jason Robards – Julia as Dashiell Hammett** ‡; Mikhail Baryshnikov – The Turning Point as Yuri Kopeikine; Peter Firth – Equus as Alan Strang; Alec Guinness – Star Wars as Obi Wan "Ben" Kenobi; Maximilian Schell – Julia as Johann | **Best Actress in a Supporting Role**: **Vanessa Redgrave – Julia as Julia** ‡; Leslie Browne – The Turning Point as Emilia Rodgers; Quinn Cummings – The Goodbye Girl as Lucy McFadden; Melinda Dillon – Close Encounters of the Third Kind as Jillian Guiler; Tuesday Weld – Looking for Mr. Goodbar as Katherine Dunn |
| **Best Writing (Screenplay Written Directly for the Screen -- Based on Factual Material or on Story Material Not Previously Published or Produced)**: **Annie Hall – Woody Allen and Marshall Brickman**‡; The Goodbye Girl – Neil Simon; The Late Show – Robert Benton; Star Wars – George Lucas; The Turning Point – Arthur Laurents | **Best Writing (Screenplay -- Based on Material from Another Medium)**: **Julia – Alvin Sargent based on the novel Pentimento by Lillian Hellman**‡; Equus – Peter Shaffer based on his play; I Never Promised You a Rose Garden – Gavin Lambert and Lewis John Carlino based on the novel by Hannah Greene; Oh, God! – Larry Gelbart based on the novel by Avery Corman; That Obscure Object of Desire – Luis Buñuel and Jean-Claude Carrière based on the novel La Femme et le pantin by Pierre Louÿs |
| **Best Foreign Language Film**: **Madame Rosa (France) in French – directed by Moshé Mizrahi**‡; Iphigenia (Greece) in Greek – directed by Michael Cacoyannis; Operation Thunderbolt (Israel) in Hebrew, English, Arabic, German, French, and Spanish – directed by Menahem Golan; A Special Day (Italy) in Italian – directed by Ettore Scola; That Obscure Object of Desire (Spain) in Spanish – directed by Luis Buñuel | **Best Documentary (Feature)**: **Who Are the DeBolts? And Where Did They Get Nineteen Kids? – John Korty, Dan McCann and Warren L. Lockhart**‡; The Children of Theatre Street – Robert Dornhelm and Earle Mack; High Grass Circus – Bill Brind, Torben Schioler and Tony Ianzelo; Homage to Chagall: The Colours of Love – Harry Rasky; Union Maids – James Klein, Julia Reichert and Miles Mogulescu |
| **Best Documentary (Short Subject)**: **Gravity Is My Enemy – John Joseph and Jan Stussy**‡; Agueda Martinez: Our People, Our Country – Moctesuma Esparza; First Edition – Helen Whitney and DeWitt L. Sage Jr.; Of Time, Tombs and Treasures – James R. Messenger and Paul N. Raimondi; The Shetland Experience – Douglas Gordon | **Best Short Film (Live Action)**: **I'll Find a Way – Beverly Shaffer and Yuki Yoshida**‡; The Absent-Minded Waiter – William E. McEuen; Floating Free – Jerry Butts; Notes on the Popular Arts – Saul Bass; Spaceborne – Philip Dauber |
| **Best Short Film (Animated)**: **The Sand Castle – Co Hoedeman**‡; Bead Game – Ishu Patel; The Doonesbury Special – John Hubley (posthumous nomination), Faith Hubley and Garry Trudeau; Jimmy the C – James Picker, Robert Grossman and Craig Whitaker | **Best Music (Original Score)**: **Star Wars – John Williams**‡; Close Encounters of the Third Kind – John Williams; Julia – Georges Delerue; Mohammad, Messenger of God – Maurice Jarre; The Spy Who Loved Me – Marvin Hamlisch |
| **Best Music (Original Song Score and Its Adaptation or Adaptation Score)**: **A Little Night Music – Adapted by Jonathan Tunick**‡; Pete's Dragon – Song Score by Al Kasha and Joel Hirschhorn; Adapted by Irwin Kostal; The Slipper and the Rose: The Story of Cinderella – Song Score by Richard M. Sherman and Robert B. Sherman; Adapted by Angela Morley | **Best Music (Original Song)**: **"You Light Up My Life" from You Light Up My Life – Music and Lyrics by Joseph Brooks**‡; "Candle on the Water" from Pete's Dragon – Music and Lyrics by Al Kasha and Joel Hirschhorn; "Nobody Does It Better" from The Spy Who Loved Me – Music by Marvin Hamlisch; Lyrics by Carole Bayer Sager; "The Slipper and the Rose Waltz (He Danced with Me/She Danced with Me)" from The Slipper and the Rose: The Story of Cinderella – Music and Lyrics by Richard M. Sherman and Robert B. Sherman; "Someone's Waiting for You" from The Rescuers – Music by Sammy Fain; Lyrics by Carol Connors and Ayn Robbins |
| **Best Sound**: **Star Wars – Don MacDougall, Ray West, Bob Minkler and Derek Ball**‡; Close Encounters of the Third Kind – Robert Knudson, Robert J. Glass, Don MacDougall and Gene S. Cantamessa; The Deep – Walter Goss, Dick Alexander, Tom Beckert and Robin Gregory; Sorcerer – Robert Knudson, Robert J. Glass, Richard Tyler and Jean-Louis Ducarme; The Turning Point – Theodore Soderberg, Paul Wells, Douglas O. Williams and Jerry Jost | **Best Art Direction**: **Star Wars – Art Direction: John Barry, Norman Reynolds and Leslie Dilley; Set Decoration: Roger Christian**‡; Airport '77 – Art Direction: George C. Webb; Set Decoration: Mickey S. Michaels; Close Encounters of the Third Kind – Art Direction: Joe Alves and Dan Lomino; Set Decoration: Phil Abramson; The Spy Who Loved Me – Art Direction: Ken Adam and Peter Lamont; Set Decoration: Hugh Scaife; The Turning Point – Art Direction: Albert Brenner; Set Decoration: Marvin March |
| **Best Cinematography**: **Close Encounters of the Third Kind – Vilmos Zsigmond**‡; Islands in the Stream – Fred J. Koenekamp; Julia – Douglas Slocombe; Looking for Mr. Goodbar – William A. Fraker; The Turning Point – Robert Surtees | **Best Costume Design**: **Star Wars – John Mollo**‡; Airport '77 – Edith Head and Burton Miller; Julia – Anthea Sylbert; A Little Night Music – Florence Klotz; The Other Side of Midnight – Irene Sharaff |
| **Best Film Editing**: **Star Wars – Paul Hirsch, Marcia Lucas and Richard Chew**‡; Close Encounters of the Third Kind – Michael Kahn; Julia – Walter Murch; Smokey and the Bandit – Walter Hannemann and Angelo Ross; The Turning Point – William Reynolds | **Best Visual Effects**: **Star Wars – John Stears, John Dykstra, Richard Edlund, Grant McCune and Robert Blalack**‡; Close Encounters of the Third Kind – Roy Arbogast, Douglas Trumbull, Matthew Yuricich, Gregory Jein and Richard Yuricich |

=== Non-competitive awards ===
Special Achievement Award

- To Benjamin Burtt, Jr. for the creation of the alien, creature and robot voices featured in Star Wars.
- To Frank E. Warner for the sound effects editing of Close Encounters of the Third Kind.

Honorary Award

- To Margaret Booth for her exceptional contribution to the art of film editing in the motion picture industry.

Jean Hersholt Humanitarian Award

The award recognizes individuals whose humanitarian efforts have brought credit to the motion picture industry.

- Charlton Heston

Irving G. Thalberg Memorial Award

The award honors "creative producers whose bodies of work reflect a consistently high quality of motion picture production".

- Walter Mirisch

=== Multiple nominations and awards ===
Films with multiple nominations
| Nominations | Film |
|---|---|
| 11 | Julia |
| 11 | The Turning Point |
| 10 | Star Wars (Note: Not including the Special Achievement Award.) |
| 8 | Close Encounters of the Third Kind |
| 5 | Annie Hall |
| 5 | The Goodbye Girl |
| 3 | Equus |
| 3 | The Spy Who Loved Me |
| 2 | Airport '77 |
| 2 | A Little Night Music |
| 2 | Looking for Mr. Goodbar |
| 2 | Pete's Dragon |
| 2 | The Slipper and the Rose |
| 2 | A Special Day |
| 2 | That Obscure Object of Desire |

Films with multiple wins
| Wins | Film |
|---|---|
| 6 | Star Wars |
| 4 | Annie Hall |
| 3 | Julia |

== Presenters and performers ==
The following individuals (in order of appearance) presented awards or performed musical numbers:

=== Presenters ===
Table featuring presenters for the 50th Academy Awards
| Name(s) | Role | Ref. |
|---|---|---|
| Hank Simms | Announcer for the 50th Academy Awards | |
| Howard W. Koch (AMPAS President) | Gave opening remarks welcoming guests to the awards ceremony | |
| Bette Davis Gregory Peck | Explained the voting rules to the public | |
| John Travolta | Presenter of the award for Best Supporting Actress | |
| Mark Hamill R2-D2 C-3PO | Presenters of the Special Achievement Award | |
| Jodie Foster Mickey Mouse Paul Williams | Presenters of the awards for Best Animated Short Film and Best Live Action Short Film | |
| William Holden Barbara Stanwyck | Presenters of the Best Sound | |
| Joan Fontaine | Presenter of the award for Best Visual Effects | |
| Kirk Douglas Raquel Welch | Presenters of the awards for Best Documentary Feature and Best Documentary Short Subject | |
| Billy Dee Williams | Presenter of the segment of the Academy Scientific and Technical Awards | |
| Greer Garson Henry Winkler | Presenters of the award of Best Art Direction | |
| Eva Marie Saint Jack Valenti | Presenters of the award for Best Foreign Language Film | |
| Michael Caine Maggie Smith | Presenters of the award for Best Supporting Actor | |
| Natalie Wood | Presenter of the award for Best Costume Design | |
| Johnny Green Henry Mancini Olivia Newton-John | Presenters of the awards for Best Original Score and Best Original Song Score and Its Adaptation or Adaptation Score | |
| Goldie Hawn Jon Voight | Presenters of the award for Best Cinematography | |
| Bette Davis | Presenter of the Jean Hersholt Humanitarian Award to Charlton Heston | |
| Olivia de Havilland | Presenter of the Honorary Award to Margaret Booth | |
| Farrah Fawcett Marcello Mastroianni | Presenters of the award for Best Film Editing | |
| Fred Astaire | Presenter of the award for Best Original Song | |
| Cicely Tyson King Vidor | Presenters of the award for Best Director | |
| Paddy Chayefsky | Presenter of the awards for Best Screenplay Written Directly for the Screen Based on Factual Material or on Story Material Not Previously Published or Produced and Screenplay Based on Material from Another Medium | |
| Janet Gaynor Walter Matthau | Presenters of the award for Best Actress | |
| Sylvester Stallone | Presenter of the award for Best Actor | |
| Stanley Kramer | Presenter of the Irving G. Thalberg Memorial Award to Walter Mirisch | |
| Jack Nicholson | Presenter of the award for Best Picture | |

=== Performers ===
Table featuring performers for the 50th Academy Awards
| Name | Role | Performed | Ref. |
|---|---|---|---|
| Nelson Riddle | Musical arranger and conductor | Orchestral | |
| Debbie Reynolds | Performer | "Look How Far We've Come" | |
| Debby Boone | Performer | "You Light Up My Life" from You Light Up My Life | |
| Gloria Loring | Performer | "Candle on the Water" from Pete's Dragon and "Someone's Waiting for You" from The Rescuers | |
| Sammy Davis Jr. Marvin Hamlisch | Performers | "Come Light the Candles" during a tribute honoring Richard Carlson, Zero Mostel, Peter Finch, Joan Crawford, Bing Crosby, Elvis Presley, Groucho Marx, and Charlie Chaplin | |
| Aretha Franklin | Performer | "Nobody Does It Better" from The Spy Who Loved Me | |
| Jane Powell | Performer | "The Slipper and the Rose Waltz (He Danced with Me)" from The Slipper and the Rose | |
| Academy Awards Chorus | Performers | "That's Entertainment!" | |

== Ceremony information ==
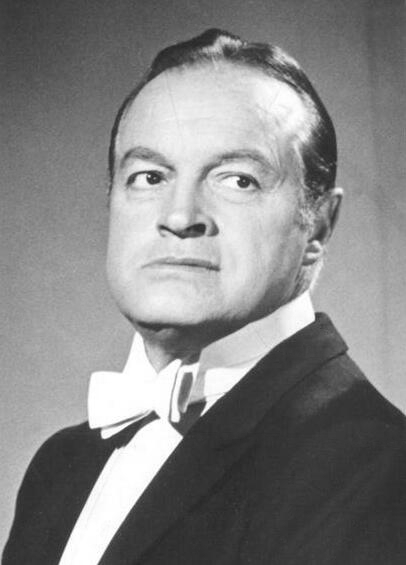
Bob Hope hosted the 50th Academy Awards.

In December 1977, the Academy announced that actor and comedian Bob Hope was chosen to host the 1978 ceremony. As a result of his selection, he became the first person to emcee the Oscars gala solo since the 40th ceremony held in 1968. Oscars gala producer Howard W. Koch explained his decision to hire Hope as host, stating, "The multiple emcee system of recent years is a good one, but we decided this year's show called for a single master of ceremonies. And we couldn't think of anyone better suited for the role than Bob Hope."

In celebration of the 50th anniversary of the Academy and the Oscars, AMPAS hosted a dinner reception at the Los Angeles Biltmore Hotel on May 11, 1977. The gala, which Hope also hosted, took place in the same spot as the organization's first meeting, exactly 50 years earlier. ABC also aired specials prior to the ceremony to highlight the history of the awards.

=== Vanessa Redgrave's speech ===
Prior to the ceremony, Vanessa Redgrave's Best Supporting Actress nomination was met with controversy due to her recent involvement with The Palestinian, a documentary chronicling the activities of the Palestine Liberation Organization. The film garnered controversy from several Jewish groups for its anti-Israel commentary. Outside of the Dorothy Chandler Pavilion on the day of the ceremony, Jewish Defense League protestors burned a statue of the actress, while counter-protestors waved Palestinian flags. After paying tribute to writer Lillian Hellman and the titular character of Julia for which she won the Best Supporting Actress award, Redgrave remarked in her acceptance speech, "And I salute you, and I pay tribute to you, and I think you should be very proud that in the last few weeks you've stood firm, and you have refused to be intimidated by the threats of a small bunch of Zionist hoodlums." She concluded her speech stating, "I salute you and I thank you and I pledge to you that I will continue to fight against Antisemitism and fascism." The comments received both applause and booing amongst the audience. Later during the ceremony, screenwriter Paddy Chayefsky prefaced his presentation of the screenplay awards, saying, "I would like to suggest to Miss Redgrave that her winning an Academy Award is not a pivotal moment in history, does not require a proclamation and a simple ‘Thank you’ would’ve sufficed."

=== Critical reviews ===
Los Angeles Times film critic Charles Champlin wrote, "The Oscar show as a show had more of what it has recently been short of, which is the presence of authentic film stars. It had refreshingly less of what it has sometimes had too much of, which is awkward and underrehearsed cross-talk." Columnist Aaron Gold of the Chicago Tribune remarked, "Howard Koch and Allan Carr deserve Oscars for the work they did in creating an exciting and glamorous show, as they promised. Master of ceremonies Bob Hope... brought the air of dignity and continuity to the show that it lacked last year." The News & Observer entertainment columnist commented, "If the evening was never as nimble as a dance by Fred Astaire, it was jam-packed with nostalgia, suspense, laughter, a few tears, and production numbers as striking as anything in Oscar's history."

John Huddy of the Miami Herald observed, "The Redgrave-Chayevsky exchange enlivened a long Oscar night in which there were too many silly songs, too many special awards that nobody gave a hoot about, and too many dreary acceptance speeches by obscure if talented short-subject makers." The Arizona Republic columnist Mike Petryni wrote, "Produced this year by Howard Koch, who incidentally co-wrote Casablanca, the show seemed, as usual, rather dull, draggy and sluggish. Writing for the Fort Worth Star-Telegram said, "Monday's Academy Awards telecast seemed like one of the dullest in recent years." He noted that the Best Original Song performances were longer and more ridiculous than in previous years, and he lamented that winners Jason Robards and Woody Allen were absent to collect their awards.

=== Ratings and reception ===
The American telecast on ABC drew in an average of 48.5 million people over the length of the entire ceremony, which was a 22% increase from the previous year's ceremony. The show drew higher Nielsen ratings compared to the previous ceremony, with 36.3% of households watching with a 68% share. The ceremony presentation received five nominations at the 30th Primetime Emmys, but failed to win any of its nominations.

== See also ==
- List of submissions to the 50th Academy Awards for Best Foreign Language Film

== Bibliography ==
- Franks, Don (2005), Entertainment Awards: A Music, Cinema, Theatre and Broadcasting Guide, 1928 through 2003 (3rd ed.), Jefferson, North Carolina, United States: McFarland & Company, ISBN 978-1-5791-2396-3
- Holden, Anthony (1993), Behind the Oscar: The Secret History of the Academy Awards, New York, New York, United States: Simon & Schuster, ISBN 978-0-6717-0129-1
- Osborne, Robert (2013). 85 Years of the Oscar: The Complete History of the Academy Awards. New York, New York, United States: Abbeville Publishing Group. ISBN 978-0-7892-1142-2. OCLC 856879222.
- Terrance, Vincent (2013). Television Specials: 5,336 Entertainment Programs, 1936–2012 (5 ed.). Jefferson, North Carolina, United States: Ballantine Books, McFarland & Company. ISBN 978-1-4766-1240-9. OCLC 844373010.
- Wiley, Mason; Bona, Damien (1996), Inside Oscar: The Unofficial History of the Academy Awards (5 ed.), New York, New York, United States: Ballantine Books, ISBN 978-0-3454-0053-6, OCLC 779680732
