= 35th Golden Globe Awards =

Film award ceremony in 1978

- Date: January 28, 1978

Highlights
- Best Film: Drama: The Turning Point
- Best Film: Musical or Comedy: The Goodbye Girl
- Best Drama Series: Roots
- Best Musical or Comedy Series: All in the Family
- Best Television film: Raid on Entebbe

The 35th Golden Globe Awards, honoring the best in film and television for 1977, were held on January 28, 1978.

== Winners and nominees ==
=== Film ===
Best Motion Picture
Drama	Comedy or Musical
The Turning Point; Close Encounters of the Third Kind; I Never Promised You a Rose Garden; Julia; Star Wars	The Goodbye Girl; Annie Hall; High Anxiety; New York, New York; Saturday Night Fever
Best Performance in a Motion Picture – Drama
Actor	Actress
Richard Burton – Equus as Dr. Martin Dysart; Marcello Mastroianni – A Special Day as Gabriele; Al Pacino – Bobby Deerfield as Bobby Deerfield; Gregory Peck – MacArthur as Douglas MacArthur; Henry Winkler – Heroes as Jack Dunne	Jane Fonda – Julia as Lillian Hellman; Anne Bancroft – The Turning Point as Emma Jacklin; Diane Keaton – Looking for Mr. Goodbar as Theresa Dunn; Kathleen Quinlan – I Never Promised You a Rose Garden as Deborah Blake; Gena Rowlands – Opening Night as Myrtle Gordon
Best Performance in a Motion Picture – Comedy or Musical
Actor	Actress
Richard Dreyfuss – The Goodbye Girl as Elliott Garfield; Woody Allen – Annie Hall as Alvy Singer; Mel Brooks – High Anxiety as Dr. Richard H. Thorndyke; Robert De Niro – New York, New York as Jimmy Doyle; John Travolta – Saturday Night Fever as Tony Manero	Diane Keaton – Annie Hall as Annie Hall; Marsha Mason – The Goodbye Girl as Paula McFadden; Sally Field – Smokey and the Bandit as Carrie; Liza Minnelli – New York, New York as Francine Evans; Lily Tomlin – The Late Show as Margo Sperling
Best Supporting Performance in a Motion Picture – Drama, Comedy or Musical
Supporting Actor	Supporting Actress
Peter Firth – Equus as Alan Strang; Mikhail Baryshnikov – The Turning Point as Yuri Kopeikine; Alec Guinness – Star Wars as Obi-Wan Kenobi; Jason Robards – Julia as Dashiell Hammett; Maximilian Schell – Julia as Johann	Vanessa Redgrave – Julia as Julia; Ann-Margret – Joseph Andrews as Lady Booby; Joan Blondell – Opening Night as Sarah Goode; Leslie Browne – The Turning Point as Emilia Rodgers; Quinn Cummings – The Goodbye Girl as Lucy McFadden; Lilia Skala – Roseland as Rosa
Other
Best Director	Best Screenplay
Herbert Ross – The Turning Point; Woody Allen – Annie Hall; George Lucas – Star Wars; Steven Spielberg – Close Encounters of the Third Kind; Fred Zinnemann – Julia	The Goodbye Girl – Neil Simon; Annie Hall – Woody Allen and Marshall Brickman; Close Encounters of the Third Kind – Steven Spielberg; Julia – Alvin Sargent; The Turning Point – Arthur Laurents
Best Original Score	Best Original Song
Star Wars – John Williams; Close Encounters of the Third Kind – John Williams; Pete's Dragon – Joel Hirschhorn and Al Kasha; Saturday Night Fever – Barry, Maurice and Robin Gibb and David Shire; The Spy Who Loved Me – Marvin Hamlisch and Carole Bayer Sager	"You Light Up My Life" (Joseph Brooks) – You Light Up My Life; "Down Deep Inside" (John Barry) – The Deep; "How Deep Is Your Love" (Barry, Maurice and Robin Gibb) – Saturday Night Fever; "New York, New York" (John Kander, Fred Ebb) – New York, New York; "Nobody Does It Better" (Marvin Hamlisch, Carole Bayer Sager) – The Spy Who Loved Me
Best Foreign Film
A Special Day (Italy); Cría Cuervos (Spain); Madame Rosa (France); Pardon Mon Affaire (France); That Obscure Object of Desire (France/Spain)

The following films received multiple nominations:

Nominations	Title
7	Julia
6	The Turning Point
5	Annie Hall
5	The Goodbye Girl
4	Close Encounters of the Third Kind
4	New York, New York
4	Saturday Night Fever
4	Star Wars
2	Equus
2	High Anxiety
2	I Never Promised You a Rose Garden
2	Opening Night
2	A Special Day
2	The Spy Who Loved Me

The following films received multiple wins:

Wins	Title
4	The Goodbye Girl
2	Equus
2	Julia
2	The Turning Point

=== Television ===
Best Television Series
Drama	Musical or Comedy
Roots: Charlie's Angels; Columbo; Family; Starsky & Hutch; Upstairs, Downstairs	All in the Family: Barney Miller; The Carol Burnett Show; Happy Days; Laverne & Shirley
Best Performance in a Television Series Drama
Actor	Actress
Ed Asner - Lou Grant as Lou Grant: Robert Conrad - Baa Baa Black Sheep as Gregory "Pappy" Boyington; Peter Falk - Columbo as Lt. Columbo; James Garner - The Rockford Files as Jim Rockford; Telly Savalas - Kojak as Lt. Theo Kojak	Lesley Ann Warren - 79 Park Avenue as Marja Fludjicki / Marianne: Angie Dickinson - Police Woman as Sgt. Suzanne "Pepper" Anderson; Kate Jackson - Charlie's Angels as Sabrina Duncan; Leslie Uggams - Roots as Kizzy Reynolds; Lindsay Wagner - The Bionic Woman as Jaime Sommers
Best Performance in a Television Series – Musical or Comedy
Actor	Actress
Ron Howard - Happy Days as Richie Cunningham (TIE) Henry Winkler - Happy Days as Arthur "Fonzie" Fonzarelli (TIE): Alan Alda - M*A*S*H as Benjamin Franklin "Hawkeye" Pierce; Hal Linden - Barney Miller as Captain Barney Miller; Carroll O'Connor - All in the Family as Archie Bunker	Carol Burnett - The Carol Burnett Show as Various Characters: Bea Arthur - Maude as Maude Findlay; Penny Marshall - Laverne & Shirley as Laverne DeFazio; Isabel Sanford - The Jeffersons as Louise "Weezy" Jefferson; Jean Stapleton - All in the Family as Edith Bunker; Cindy Williams - Laverne & Shirley as Shirley Feeney
Best Miniseries or Television Film
Raid on Entebbe: Just a Little Inconvenience; Mary Jane Harper Cried Last Night; Mary White; Something for Joey

The following programs received multiple nominations:

Nominations	Title
3	All in the Family
3	Happy Days
2	Barney Miller
2	The Carol Burnett Show
2	Charlie's Angels
2	Columbo
2	Laverne & Shirley
2	Roots

The following programs received multiple wins:

Wins	Title
2	Happy Days

=== Cecil B. DeMille Award ===
Red Skelton

== See also ==
- 50th Academy Awards
- 29th Primetime Emmy Awards
- 30th Primetime Emmy Awards
- 31st British Academy Film Awards
- 32nd Tony Awards
- 1977 in film
- 1977 in television
