= Isabel Mirrow Brown =

American ballerina (1928–2014)

Isabel Brown
- Born: June 9, 1928; New York City, U.S.
- Died: August 2014 (aged 86)
- Spouse: Kelly Brown (divorced)

Isabel Mirrow Brown (June 9, 1928 – August 2014) was an American ballerina. A fictionalized version of her life was documented in the 1977 film The Turning Point, in which she was portrayed by Shirley MacLaine, who was nominated for an Academy Award for her performance.

== Personal life ==
Brown was born in New York City to Jewish-Russian immigrant parents Sonia and Alexander "Sasha" Mirrow (1893–1977).

She married dancer Kelly Kingman Brown (1928–1981) and had four children: dancers Leslie Browne and Elizabeth, and sons Kelly Brown II, a film producer, and Ethan Brown, who was a soloist dancer with ABT until 2004. Kelly Brown, originally from Mississippi, began dancing at a young age under the guidance of his mother Sue, who was a dance instructor. He later trained at the Stone-Camryn School of Ballet in Chicago before moving to New York City to join ABT, where he met Isabel. At ABT, he collaborated with Agnes de Mille.

Isabel's husband, Kelly Brown, also made appearances as a featured dancer in several Hollywood musical films, including Seven Brides for Seven Brothers, Daddy Long Legs, The Girl Most Likely, and Oklahoma!. On Broadway, he served as the dance captain for I Can Get It for You Wholesale, starring Barbra Streisand. Nora Kaye, Arthur Laurents, and Herbert Ross, who later collaborated on The Turning Point, also worked on that show.

In the 1960s, after Kelly and Isabel had transitioned away from being principal dancers, they relocated to Phoenix, Arizona, where they operated a dance studio. However, when their daughters auditioned for School of American Ballet in New York, Leslie was selected, followed by her sister Elizabeth a year later. The move to Arizona strained their marriage, as Isabel became homesick for her native New York. They divorced a year later, and Isabel returned to New York to support her daughters as they pursued their training there.

== Career ==
Mirrow was a principal dancer with the American Ballet Theatre in New York City from 1947 until 1953. Some of her peers she danced with during this time include Svetlana Beriosova, Tamara Toumanova, and Irina Baronova.

In 1945, she danced in the Broadway musical The Day Before Spring. She later became a dance mentor for many aspiring dancers and worked with Finis Jhung's Ballet Company.

== The Turning Point ==
Mirrow was childhood friends with the ballerina Nora Kaye. Their parents had immigrated from Russia to New York City at the same time and lived in the same brownstone apartment building. Kaye was later married to film director Herbert Ross. Nora Kaye was the godmother of the Brown's eldest daughter Leslie, born in 1957.

In the 1970s, a script by Arthur Laurents was developed based on the Brown Family. Shirley Maclaine was cast to play Isabel and originally, the dancer Gelsey Kirkland was cast to play Leslie. Kirkland dropped out of the film due to substance abuse problems, and Ross cast Leslie believing she would be able to portray a fictionalized version of herself in the film.

The film was directed by Herbert Ross and produced by Ross and Kaye. Released in 1977, The Turning Point was nominated for eleven Academy Awards, including Best Picture. Her daughter Leslie Browne (at age 20) was nominated for the Academy Award for Best Supporting Actress and Shirley MacLaine was nominated for playing Leslie's mother. The family name was changed to "Rodgers" for the film. Her daughter Leslie Browne had added an "e" to her name for her stage name, believing it sounded more feminine after being mistaken as male in a playbill. Her other daughter, Elizabeth (Brown) Healy (born 1959), was portrayed in the film by Lisa Lucas with her name changed to "Janina."
