= Isabel Brown =

Isabel Brown may refer to:

- Isabel Brown (American activist) (born 1997), right-wing political activist and media personality
- Isabel Brown (British activist) (1894–1984), communist political activist
- Isabel Mirrow Brown (1928–2014), American ballerina
