= The Turning Point (1977 film) =

1977 film by Herbert Ross

- Directed by: Herbert Ross
- Written by: Arthur Laurents
- Produced by: Arthur Laurents; Herbert Ross; Nora Kaye
- Starring: Anne Bancroft; Shirley MacLaine; Tom Skerritt; Mikhail Baryshnikov; Leslie Browne; Martha Scott; Marshall Thompson; Anthony Zerbe
- Cinematography: Robert Surtees
- Edited by: William H. Reynolds
- Production company: Hera Productions
- Distributed by: 20th Century Fox
- Release date: November 14, 1977
- Running time: 119 minutes
- Country: United States
- Language: English
- Box office: $33.6 million

The Turning Point is a 1977 American drama film centered on the world of ballet in New York City, written by Arthur Laurents and directed by Herbert Ross. It stars Shirley MacLaine and Anne Bancroft, along with Leslie Browne, Mikhail Baryshnikov, and Tom Skerritt. It was nominated for 11 Academy Awards, including Best Picture; however, the film did not win any Oscars, and it is tied with The Color Purple (1985) with that distinction for most nominations and no wins. The script is a fictionalized version of the real-life Brown family and the friendship between ballerinas Isabel Mirrow Brown (whose daughter, Leslie Browne, stars in the film) and Nora Kaye.

== Plot ==
DeeDee Rodgers leaves an eminent New York ballet company after becoming pregnant by Wayne, another dancer in the company. They marry and later move to Oklahoma City to run a dance studio. Emma Jacklin stays with the company and eventually becomes a prima ballerina and well-known figure in the ballet community.

While the company is on tour and performs a show in Oklahoma City, DeeDee and the family go to see the show and then have an after-party for the company at their home. The reunion stirs up old memories and sets the plot into motion.

At the party, DeeDee's daughter Emilia, an aspiring dancer who is also Emma's goddaughter, is invited to take class with the company the following day. Afterwards, Emilia is asked to join the company but she does not immediately accept the offer as she wants to think it over. DeeDee and Wayne decide that DeeDee should go to New York with Emilia, who is rather shy and does not make friends as easily as her younger sister. Meanwhile, their son, Ethan, gets a scholarship to the company's summer program while Wayne and their other daughter stay in Oklahoma City.

Once in New York, they rent several rooms in Carnegie Hall with Madame Dakharova, a ballet coach. Emilia soon starts a relationship with a Russian dancer in the company, Yuri. However, when she catches Yuri with another dancer, Caroline, the broken-hearted Emilia gets drunk in a bar before a performance, and Emma takes the situation at hand and cares for and helps Emilia complete the performance. This angers DeeDee who, because of a brief affair with the former conductor of the company, has caused conflict between herself and Emilia. Meanwhile, Emma argues with Arnold, the choreographer, about giving her a better role in his new ballet, which he refuses and leads Emma to suggest Emilia for the role instead. DeeDee resents that Emma dotes on Emilia; after all, DeeDee chose family life over her career while Emma chose not to have children and to excel as a ballerina. DeeDee accuses Emma of telling her to get pregnant and have Wayne's baby so Emma could play the lead in Anna Karenina.

Eventually, Emma and DeeDee get into a physical altercation on the rooftop of Carnegie Hall before finally settling their misunderstandings; DeeDee admits her jealousy of Emma's life, and Emma admits that she would have "done anything" to get the lead in Anna Karenina.

Because of her stunning performance in Arnold's ballet, Emilia is given the lead in Sleeping Beauty alongside former love Yuri, and she and Yuri make up and agree to a professional partnership and nothing more. DeeDee decides she is content with her life and the decision she made to leave professional ballet to have a family. Emma accepts that her performing days are numbered, and she must embrace a different role within the company. DeeDee and Emma step onto the stage and reminisce together.

== Cast ==
- Shirley MacLaine as DeeDee Rodgers – a former ballerina with the company (based on Isabel Mirrow)
- Anne Bancroft as Emma Jacklin – an aging prima ballerina (based on Nora Kaye)
- Tom Skerritt as Wayne Rodgers – a former dancer with the company, married to DeeDee (based on Kelly Brown)
- Leslie Browne as Emilia Rodgers – a young ballerina beginning professional training and becoming a woman (based on herself)
- Mikhail Baryshnikov as Yuri Kopeikine – Emilia's playboy love interest
- Martha Scott as Adelaide – a former dancer, now head of the company (based on Lucia Chase)
- James Mitchell as Michael Cooke – the company artistic director (based on Jerome Robbins)
- Alexandra Danilova as Madame Dakharova – a ballet coach
- Lisa Lucas as Janina Rodgers – sister of Emilia (based on Elizabeth Brown)
- Philip Saunders as Ethan Rodgers – brother of Emilia who takes ballet himself (based on Ethan Brown)
- Antoinette Sibley as Sevilla Haslam – a rival ballerina
- Marshall Thompson as Carter – a married man Emma is dating
- Starr Danias as Carolyn – a rival ballerina that Yuri leaves Emilia for
- Anthony Zerbe as Joe "Rosie" Rosenberg – a married former conductor of the company with whom DeeDee has an affair
- Daniel Levans as Arnold Berger – a headstrong choreographer with the company

A number of actresses were offered the roles of Emma and DeeDee, including Audrey Hepburn, Grace Kelly, and Doris Day.

Bancroft had no previous dance experience, while MacLaine had started her career as a dancer of ballet and other types. She appeared on Broadway performing in the musicals Me and Juliet and The Pajama Game.

The title "The Turning Point" is a pun, meaning a big change in a person's life and being on pointe.

Choreography for the film was done by Alvin Ailey and George Balanchine.

== Production ==
The story is based on events in the lives of Isabel Mirrow Brown and Nora Kaye, who became friends as children. Their parents had emigrated from Russia around the same time and they lived in the same New York City brownstone building. Kaye was a few years older than Mirrow and encouraged her to train. Nora Kaye was in a relationship with Jerome Robbins in the early 1950s, but they never married, focusing on their careers instead. Robbins was also a known bisexual.

Isabel Mirrow danced with American Ballet Theatre from 1947 until 1953. Nora was with the company from its inception in 1939 until 1951, and later returned in a leadership role. Unlike in the film, Isabel did not get pregnant while she was with the company; however, during this time Isabel married fellow dancer Kelly Brown, who was widely sought after. Lucia Chase was the head of the company when Isabel and Nora were there.

Kaye continued to dance in New York with other companies and became a more prominent figure in the ballet world, while Isabel had stopped performing to marry and have children. Her first child, Leslie Browne, born in 1957, was Nora Kaye's goddaughter. Kaye went on to marry director Herbert Ross in 1959. The two couples were close friends, along with Arthur Laurents. Kelly Brown, Ross, Kaye, and Laurents all worked together in the Broadway musical I Can Get It for You Wholesale in 1962. In his autobiography, Laurents wrote that in the 1940s he had a sexual relationship with Nora Kaye.

In 1965, an opportunity to run a dance studio opened up, and Kelly Brown decided to move his family to Phoenix, Arizona (changed to Oklahoma City in the film). By this time he and his wife had aged out of performing. Isabel Mirrow Brown was not thrilled to leave her native New York for Arizona, and the move caused strain in their marriage. When their daughter Leslie auditioned and was accepted to train back in New York in the School of American Ballet (SAB), Isabel moved back to New York to watch over Leslie, who was still a teenager. The film depicts Isabel's experience entering back into the dance world after living in Phoenix and having four children (three in the film). In real life she eventually divorced Kelly Brown, who died in 1981 at age 52.

While in Arizona the Browns had kept in touch with their friends Nora and Herbert. Later in the mid-1970s, a script based on the Brown family was developed by Arthur Laurents. Ross directed the film and co-produced with his wife. Ross, Laurents, and Kaye never had children and took a special interest in Leslie Browne as she grew older.

The script was a fictionalized version of the Browns' life and the long friendship between Isabel and Nora. The fictional parts primarily concern the character Yuri, who was created as a love interest for Emilia. Originally, the ballerina Gelsey Kirkland, who was at the height of her fame at the time and dating Mikhail Baryshnikov (Yuri), was offered the role of Emilia. She rejected the role as she was dealing with substance abuse issues at the time and she "wanted no part of Hollywood". Ross then decided that Leslie Browne, who was nineteen at the time, would be able to portray a fictionalized version of herself in the film. In real life, Leslie had just joined ABT in 1976 and was experiencing the same things she portrayed on screen. Leslie had added an "e" to her last name as her stage name to sound more feminine after being mistaken as a man in a playbill.

The script changed the family name from Brown to Rodgers, and all the first names except for their son Ethan Brown. The real-life Ethan Brown later became a soloist with American Ballet Theatre, retiring from performing in 2004; he now teaches. In real life, the Browns had another son, Kelly Brown II, who danced as a child but did not train professionally like his siblings and later became a film producer. Their other daughter, Elizabeth Brown (born 1959), was also a dancer, unlike in the film, and was accepted into SAB a year after Leslie. Nora Kaye died of cancer in 1987 at age 67. After the film, Leslie Browne went on to become a principal dancer with American Ballet Theatre in New York City from 1986 until 1993 and now teaches ballet. Her mother Isabel continued to be associated with New York ballet and died in August 2014 at the age of 86.

Herbert Ross later directed two more dance-themed films, Nijinsky (1980) and Dancers (1987), both of which also feature Leslie Browne.

Arthur Laurents claimed an important subplot regarding Wayne's homosexuality in the original script was cut from the film by Herbert Ross and his wife. This was the reason why Wayne's character's development does not progress steadily throughout the film.

== Reception and legacy ==
=== Critical response ===
Vincent Canby of The New York Times called the film an "entertaining new movie, an old-fashioned backstage musical transplanted to the world of ballet by three people who not only know it but also love it, sentimental clichés and all." Arthur D. Murphy of Variety declared it "one of the best films of this era. It's that rare example of synergy in which every key element is excellent and the ensemble is an absolute triumph." Gene Siskel of the Chicago Tribune gave the film three-and-a-half stars out of four and wrote, "In a movie year that will be remembered as the year of the science-fiction special effect, it is refreshing to see a film such as 'The Turning Point,' which offers another kind of excitement: the pleasure of following a story you can't easily anticipate." Charles Champlin of the Los Angeles Times stated, "The performances by Bancroft and MacLaine are stunning, and both are at Academy Award level ... 'The Turning Point' is a handsome, thoughtful, well-spoken and emotionally holding piece of stylish entertainment." Gary Arnold of The Washington Post called the film "enormously appealing" and "an authentic breakthrough-throwback: a vividly enacted depiction of the conflicts between strong, capable, conscious, willful women." Pauline Kael of The New Yorker wrote, "As a device, the turning point (like that synthetic summer when adolescent heroes grow into men) is so mechanical it's an exposed construction ... [Laurents] writes sodden, expository dialogue in which people are forever revealing truths to each other and then explaining those truths—'The Turning Point' comes with its own footnotes."

On the review aggregator website Rotten Tomatoes, 63% of 27 critics' reviews are positive, with an average rating of 6.2/10. The website's consensus reads: "The Turning Point is a handsomely-made resuscitation of Old Hollywood melodramas with a compelling duo at its center, but the formulaic script keeps this story from realizing its symphonic potential." On Metacritic it has a score of 68% based on reviews from 10 critics.

=== Awards and nominations ===
The film was nominated for 11 Academy Awards, but failed to win any of them. It shares the record with The Color Purple for receiving the most Oscar nominations without a single win.

Award	Category	Recipients	Result
Academy Awards	Best Picture	Herbert Ross and Arthur Laurents	Nominated
Academy Awards	Best Director	Herbert Ross	Nominated
Academy Awards	Best Actress	Anne Bancroft	Nominated
Academy Awards	Best Actress	Shirley MacLaine	Nominated
Academy Awards	Best Supporting Actor	Mikhail Baryshnikov	Nominated
Academy Awards	Best Supporting Actress	Leslie Browne	Nominated
Academy Awards	Best Screenplay – Written Directly for the Screen	Arthur Laurents	Nominated
Academy Awards	Best Art Direction	Art Direction: Albert Brenner; Set Decoration: Marvin March	Nominated
Academy Awards	Best Cinematography	Robert Surtees	Nominated
Academy Awards	Best Film Editing	William H. Reynolds	Nominated
Academy Awards	Best Sound	Theodore Soderberg, Paul Wells, Douglas O. Williams, and Jerry Jost	Nominated
American Cinema Editors Awards	Best Edited Feature Film	William Reynolds	Won
British Academy Film Awards	Best Actress in a Leading Role	Anne Bancroft	Nominated
David di Donatello Awards	David Giovani Award	Mikhail Baryshnikov	Won
Directors Guild of America Awards	Outstanding Directorial Achievement in Motion Pictures	Herbert Ross	Nominated
Golden Globe Awards	Best Motion Picture – Drama		Won
Golden Globe Awards	Best Actress in a Motion Picture – Drama	Anne Bancroft	Nominated
Golden Globe Awards	Best Supporting Actor – Motion Picture	Mikhail Baryshnikov	Nominated
Golden Globe Awards	Best Supporting Actress – Motion Picture	Leslie Browne	Nominated
Golden Globe Awards	Best Director – Motion Picture	Herbert Ross	Won
Golden Globe Awards	Best Screenplay – Motion Picture	Arthur Laurents	Nominated
Japan Academy Film Prize	Outstanding Foreign Language Film		Nominated
Los Angeles Film Critics Association Awards	Best Director	Herbert Ross	Won
Motion Picture Sound Editors Awards	Best Sound Editing – Dialogue	Godfrey Marks	Won
National Board of Review Awards	Best Film		Won
National Board of Review Awards	Top Ten Films		Won
National Board of Review Awards	Best Actress	Anne Bancroft	Won
National Board of Review Awards	Best Supporting Actor	Tom Skerritt	Won
Writers Guild of America Awards	Best Drama – Written Directly for the Screenplay	Arthur Laurents	Won

=== Appearances in popular culture ===
- In an episode of The Nanny, Fran references the film by saying: "This is like that movie The Turning Point, only they were dancers and one was the mother and they were old friends... [looks confused] I should really rent that again."
- In the Judy Blume book Summer Sisters this film sparked a great discussion with the two main characters of the story, Vix and Caitlin, which showed how different the girls' priorities were.
- In the episode of That '70s Show entitled "Fez Dates Donna", Eric, much to his delight, could not take Donna out to see the movie since Donna was pretending to be dating Fez.
- In an episode of Beverly Hills, 90210 ("Pass/Not Pass"), Brenda (Shannen Doherty) and Andrea (Gabrielle Carteris) perform a scene from the film for their theater class.
- In the opening episode of Bunheads, Sutton Foster responds to hearing her mother-in-law's life story by saying "How very Turning Point."
- The film is mentioned in the final episode of Feud: Bette & Joan ("You Mean All This Time We Could Have Been Friends?"); while attending the 1978 Academy Awards ceremony, Bette Davis (Susan Sarandon) praises the film to a bartender who asks her which of that year's "Best Picture" nominees she hopes wins. Davis speaks positively of the film and its feminist themes and calls the film (and Bancroft/MacLaine's rooftop fight) "the story of her life".

== See also ==
- List of Russian Academy Award winners and nominees for Best Supporting Actor
