= Paul Wells (disambiguation) =

Paul Wells (born 1966) is a Canadian journalist and pundit.

Paul Wells may also refer to:

- Paul Wells (musician) (1888–1927), American pianist and composer
- Paul Wells (sound engineer) (1930–2005), American sound engineer
- Paul Wells, character in the American TV series Last Resort
