= National Board of Review Awards 1977 =

Annual US film awards ceremony

49th National Board of Review Awards

December 19, 1977

Best Picture:
The Turning Point

The 49th National Board of Review Awards were announced on December 19, 1977.

== Top ten films ==
1. The Turning Point
2. Annie Hall
3. Julia
4. Star Wars
5. Close Encounters of the Third Kind
6. The Late Show
7. Saturday Night Fever
8. Equus
9. The Picture Show Man
10. Harlan County, USA

== Top foreign films ==
1. That Obscure Object of Desire
2. The Man Who Loved Women
3. A Special Day
4. Cria!
5. The American Friend

== Winners ==
- Best Picture:
  - The Turning Point
- Best Foreign Film:
  - That Obscure Object of Desire
- Best Actor:
  - John Travolta - Saturday Night Fever
- Best Actress:
  - Anne Bancroft - The Turning Point
- Best Supporting Actor:
  - Tom Skerritt - The Turning Point
- Best Supporting Actress:
  - Diane Keaton - Annie Hall
- Best Director:
  - Luis Buñuel - That Obscure Object of Desire
- Special Citation:
  - Close Encounters of the Third Kind, for outstanding special effects
  - The Rescuers, for restoring and upgrading the art of animation
