= The Last of Sheila =

1973 mystery thriller film directed by Herbert Ross

- Theatrical release poster
- Directed by: Herbert Ross
- Written by: Anthony Perkins; Stephen Sondheim
- Produced by: Herbert Ross
- Starring: Richard Benjamin; Dyan Cannon; James Coburn; Joan Hackett; James Mason; Ian McShane; Raquel Welch
- Cinematography: Gerry Turpin
- Edited by: Edward Warschilka
- Music by: Billy Goldenberg
- Production company: Hera Productions
- Distributed by: Warner Bros.
- Release date: June 14, 1973
- Running time: 120 minutes
- Country: United States
- Language: English
- Budget: $2 million
- Box office: $2,200,000 (US/ Canada rentals)

The Last of Sheila is a 1973 American whodunnit mystery film directed and produced by Herbert Ross and written by Anthony Perkins and Stephen Sondheim. It stars Richard Benjamin, Dyan Cannon, James Coburn, Joan Hackett, James Mason, Ian McShane, and Raquel Welch.

The film was released to positive reviews, and has garnered a solid following over time. The script by Perkins and Sondheim was later novelized by Alexander Edwards.

== Plot ==
On a one-week Mediterranean pleasure cruise aboard the "Sheila," the yacht of movie producer Clinton Greene, the guests include: actress Alice Wood; her talent-manager husband Anthony Wood (né Blondin but he took her last name instead); talent agent Christine; screenwriter Tom Parkman and his wife Lee; and director Philip Dexter. All but Lee were together at Clinton's home one year before, on the night a hit-and-run accident resulted in the death of Clinton's wife, gossip columnist Sheila Greene.

Greene, a parlor game enthusiast, informs everyone that the week's entertainment will consist of "The Sheila Greene Memorial Gossip Game". Each guest is assigned an index card containing a secret that must be kept hidden from the others. The game's objective is to discover everyone else's secret while protecting one's own. Each night, the yacht anchors at a different Mediterranean port city, where one of the six secrets is disclosed to the entire group. The guests are given a clue, then sent ashore to find the proof of who holds the card bearing that secret. The game for that night ends when the actual holder discovers the proof.

Following the first day's game, suspicion begins that the "pretend" secrets are actually true. The first card says "YOU are a SHOPLIFTER" and was assigned to Philip, but it applies to Alice, who was caught shoplifting before becoming famous.

On the second day, Christine almost dies when someone turns the boat's propellers on while she is swimming near them. The second secret is revealed to be "YOU are a HOMOSEXUAL". In the evening, Greene goes to the designated island and prepares for the "game" ahead of the guests. It takes place in a monastery, with all guests dressed in hooded monks' robes; in addition to the robe, Greene is dressed up as Alice, with a wig and makeup. The game does not run as smoothly as in the first night. The following day, the guests discuss the game on the yacht and notice that Greene has not returned. Returning to the monastery, they discover his corpse.

Back on the yacht, Parkman suggests that Greene was murdered by one of them. He suggests that the rest should put their index cards on the table. Five cards are revealed: YOU are a SHOPLIFTER, HOMOSEXUAL, EX-CONVICT, INFORMER, and LITTLE CHILD MOLESTER. Parkman reveals his card -- "YOU are a HIT-AND-RUN KILLER" -- and suggests that the hit-and-run killer murdered Greene to conceal their involvement in Sheila's death. Parkman volunteers that the "HOMOSEXUAL" card applies to him. He had a brief encounter with Greene years before Parkman was married to Lee.

Alice admits to being the shoplifter. Christine reveals that when she was a secretary in the film industry, during the Second Red Scare, she informed on left-leaning actors to further her career and become a talent agent. Out of guilt, she says she now tries to help them find work. Anthony reveals that he is the "EX-CONVICT," having been jailed twice for assault, then taunts Dexter about choosing one of the two final cards. Before he does, Lee, who has been drinking, tearfully confesses to having killed Sheila while driving drunk the previous year (she was on her way to Clinton's party when she accidentally struck Sheila. Panicked, she drove back home) and to killing Clinton the previous night after he provoked her with this fact. Distraught, she locks herself in her cabin. She is later found dead, with her wrists slit, in the bathtub in Greene's cabin, and the case seems to be closed.

On the final night of the cruise, the crew and most of the guests go to a party onshore, but Dexter, who brought no money, remains on the ship. Parkman sees lights on the ship blinking on and off and returns to find Dexter pondering loose ends of earlier events. Dexter suspects that Lee "killed" a dead body, and that the real murderer rearranged the scene to implicate her. Dexter points out that the six "secrets" spell out "SHEILA", except for the final letter "A", which breaks the pattern.

After figuring out what the game was the first night, Parkman actually changed out his own card—"YOU are an ALCOHOLIC" (the missing A)—for a more condemning one: "YOU are a HIT-AND-RUN KILLER", knowing both secrets applied to Lee. He later arranged for Lee to see that new card, leading her to believe that the game's purpose was to expose her for her role in Sheila's death.

On the second night, Parkman murdered Greene, and framed Lee for the deed. Then, he spiked her bottle of bourbon with sleeping pills, and after she drank it, carried her body into the bathtub and slit her wrists, making it seem like a suicide. Lee's estate, worth $5 million, therefore went to Parkman, making him wealthy and free of a marriage that bored him.

Dexter also attempted to kill Greene with the boat's propellers to prevent his secret from coming out. Parkman tries to kill Dexter, but is stopped by Christine, who had come up to the yacht for a sexual rendezvous and has heard their entire conversation. Dexter and Christine then blackmail Parkman: In exchange for keeping the secret that he killed Greene, Parkman must finance their next film with the money from Lee's estate.

== Cast ==
- Richard Benjamin as Tom Parkman, a screenwriter
- Dyan Cannon as Christine, an agent
- James Coburn as Clinton Greene, a producer
- Joan Hackett as Lee Parkman, Tom's wife
- James Mason as Philip Dexter, a director
- Ian McShane as Anthony Wood, Alice's manager
- Raquel Welch as Alice Wood, an actress
- Yvonne Romain as Sheila Greene, Clinton's wife

== Production ==
The movie was inspired by an irregular series of elaborate, real-life scavenger hunts Sondheim and Perkins arranged for their show business friends (including Lee Remick and George Segal) in Manhattan in the late 1960s and early 1970s. Herb Ross also took part in the treasure hunts with his wife, Nora Kaye. Ross said one of the clues was spelled out by icing on a cake which had been cut up into different pieces.

The climax of one hunt was staged in the lobby of a seedy flophouse (see Sunshine Hotel and The Bowery House), where participants heard a skipping LP record endlessly repeating the first line of the Harold Arlen/Johnny Mercer standard "One for My Baby" ("It's quarter to three ... It's quarter to three ..."). The winning team eventually recognized the clue — 2:45 — and immediately headed for room 245 of the hotel, where bottles of champagne awaited them.

Sondheim later recalled:

The idea for the movie grew out of two murder games I devised some time ago. One was for Phyllis Newman; the other for four couples just after I got out of college. A murder game? No, nobody gets murdered. With the four couples, I told each person to think of a way to kill one of the others over the weekend we would be spending together in the country. Then we passed out envelopes and inside one was an "X". That person was the only one who was to carry out his plan; the others were to spend the time avoiding being murdered.

Herb Ross made the film for his own production company; it was distributed by Warner Bros. Ross:

If you have a group of people on a ship, the ship becomes a metaphor for existence, you can't help it. It's not a symbol one strives for, but it does happen. It's not a picture about film people, it's about people... I'll tell you what this picture is about. It's about civilisation and barbarism. You cannot make up for the absence of civilisation.

=== Casting ===
Stephen Sondheim said he and Perkins "thought of the secrets before the characters". The character of Christine, played by Dyan Cannon, was based on talent agent Sue Mengers.

Herbert Ross originally offered the role to Mengers herself, but she turned it down, claiming too many of her clients were out of work. Instead she pitched her client, Dyan Cannon, for the part. Mengers stated, "But they came and took pictures of my office to see what a lady agent's office looks like ... It's filled with ferns and plants. They want to construct a set just like it over in Nice."

Cannon later said she had not wanted to do the film at first as she disliked the role, "the script seemed too broad, everybody caricaturised, especially my part. I mean, Sue Mengers is wild, but not that wild. There seemed to be no humanity in the women's roles." She said Mengers talked her into it as "it'll be a chance to show them you've got something more than your obvious assets." Cannon said she gained 19 pounds to play the role and the part was "finally changed, deepened. I still had to bring a lot to it, and I think the result's unlike anything I've ever done."

James Mason played a washed-up film director, who was reportedly based on a composite of two real-life directors. "Steve and Tony insist they wrote the part for me", said Mason. "If they did, they did it for a ready-made image. If the passé director is played by someone who makes constant appearances on The Late, Late Show, it helps. Consequently I'm playing it as everybody's idea of James Mason."

Raquel Welch played a movie starlet and Ian McShane her manager-husband. Welch claimed the two were based on Ann-Margret and her husband, Roger Smith. Sondheim later said the part was actually based on Welch herself and her one time husband Patrick Curtis. In a 1975 interview, Welch said she thought she had been "good" in Kansas City Bomber, Myra Breckenridge and The Last of Sheila. James Coburn signed for a relatively brief role.

=== Shooting ===
The movie was shot in the south of France. In an interview for a fortieth-anniversary screening of the film, Cannon said that filming on an actual yacht proved to be too difficult, and so production was halted, stranding the cast on location: "So we had to wait in the south of France while they built a set at the Victorine Studios [in Nice] for us. We had to spend our days lying on the beach and going to lunch and shopping. It was a hard job!"

The shoot was not easy; according to Cannon, the first cameraman was fired and the yacht sank. This required reshooting early in the process. There were also complaints about Welch's behaviour. In turn, she announced she was suing Herbert Ross for assault and battery as a result of an incident in her dressing room. She claimed she had to flee to London during the shoot "to escape physical harm". However, she then returned to Nice to shoot the film's final scenes, although she was provided with a bodyguard. Warner Bros later issued a statement supporting Ross and criticising Welch for her "public utterances". Mason told a newspaper at the time that Welch was "the most selfish, ill-mannered, inconsiderate actress that I've ever had the displeasure of working with".

Joel Schumacher worked on the film as costume designer.

== Soundtrack ==
The original music score was composed by Billy Goldenberg. The Bette Midler song "Friends" plays as the final scene transitions to the end credits.

== Reception ==
Critical reception for the film was mostly positive. On the review aggregator website Rotten Tomatoes, 90% of 21 critics' reviews are positive, with an average rating of 7/10. Vincent Canby of The New York Times called the film "an old-fashioned murder mystery" that "makes murder, as well as life, more interesting." Roger Ebert of the Chicago Sun-Times gave the film three and a half out of 4 stars, praising the cast and script, and saying, "It's the kind of movie that wraps you up in itself, and absorbs you at the very time you're being impressed by its cleverness. And it leaves you thinking maybe Sheila got off easy, after all."

In a 2007 review for Empire, Kim Newman gave the film four stars, writing "It remains an underrated pleasure, a rare original film mystery (most whodunits are adapted from novels – which means your target audience already knows the solution) with dialogue as precisely turned as one of Norman Bates's twitches or Sweeney Todd's razor-rhymes."

== Legacy ==
Filmmakers Edgar Wright and Larry Karaszewski have extolled the film in recorded introductions for Turner Classic Movies and Trailers from Hell, respectively.

Beau Flynn and Joel Silver were attached to a 2012 announcement that New Line Cinema would remake the film, though the project was never produced.

Director Rian Johnson cited The Last of Sheila as an inspiration for his 2019 film Knives Out, as well as its 2022 sequel Glass Onion, which includes Sondheim's last film appearance.

"Johnson has been happy to acknowledge that the similarities between Glass Onion and The Last of Sheila are explicit."

== Awards ==
Perkins and Sondheim won the 1974 Edgar Award for Best Motion Picture from the Mystery Writers of America. They went on to try to collaborate again two more times, on The Chorus Girl Murder Case and Crime and Variations, but the projects were ultimately not made.
