= A Special Day =

1977 film by Ettore Scola

- Italian theatrical release poster
- Italian: Una giornata particolare
- Directed by: Ettore Scola
- Written by: Ruggero Maccari; Ettore Scola; Maurizio Costanzo
- Produced by: Carlo Ponti
- Starring: Sophia Loren; Marcello Mastroianni
- Cinematography: Pasqualino De Santis
- Edited by: Raimondo Crociani
- Music by: Armando Trovajoli
- Production companies: Compagnia Cinematografica Champion; Canafox Films
- Distributed by: Gold Film (Italy)
- Release dates: 17 May 1977 (Cannes); 12 August 1977 (Italy)
- Running time: 106 minutes
- Countries: Italy; Canada
- Language: Italian

A Special Day (Italian: Una giornata particolare) is a 1977 period drama film directed and co-written by Ettore Scola, produced by Carlo Ponti, and starring Sophia Loren and Marcello Mastroianni. Set in Rome in 1938, its narrative follows a housewife (Loren) and her neighbor (Mastroianni) who stay home the day Adolf Hitler visits Benito Mussolini.

Themes addressed in the film include gender roles, fascism, and the persecution of homosexuals under the Mussolini regime.

An Italian-Canadian co-production, the film premiered at the 1977 Cannes Film Festival. It earned several accolades and nominations, including David di Donatello Awards for Best Director (Scola) and Best Actress (Loren), a Golden Globe for Best Foreign Language Film, and two Oscar nominations, for Best Foreign Language Film and Best Actor (Mastroianni).

In 2008, the film was included on the Italian Ministry of Cultural Heritage’s 100 Italian films to be saved, a list of 100 films that "have changed the collective memory of the country between 1942 and 1978."

== Plot ==
Gabriele (Mastroianni) and Antonietta (Loren) in her living room

On 4 May 1938, the day Hitler visits Mussolini in Rome, Antonietta, a naïve, sentimental and overworked homemaker, stays home doing her usual domestic tasks, while her fascist husband, Emanuele, and their six spoiled children take to the streets to follow a parade. The building is empty, except for the caretaker Pauletta and a neighbor across the complex, a charming man named Gabriele. He is a radio broadcaster who has been dismissed from his job and is about to be deported to Sardinia because of his homosexuality and alleged anti-fascist stance.

After the family's myna escapes from their apartment and flies outside Gabriele's window, Antonietta shows up at his door, asking to be let in to reach the bird. Gabriele has been interrupted from attempting suicide, but helps rescue the myna by offering it food, and is amused by the episode. Antonietta is surprised by his demeanor and, unaware of his sexual orientation, flirts and dances the rumba with him.

Despite their differences, they warm to each other. Pauletta warns Antonietta that Gabriele is an anti-fascist, which Antonietta finds despicable. Gabriele eventually opens up, confessing he was fired because he is a homosexual. Antonietta confides in him about her troubles with her arrogant and unfaithful husband, who, she says, has shown a preference for an educated woman.

Throughout their interaction and conversation, each realizes that the other is oppressed by social and governmental conditioning and comes to form a new impression of the other than the one they first drew from one another. As a result, they have sex, but for different reasons. Gabriele explains that this changes nothing, as does Antonietta. (However, later, when her son reminds his mother of all the newspaper clippings she will have from the parade for her album collection, Antonietta's face reveals a look of slight indifference.) Soon after their intimate encounter, Antonietta's family comes back home, and Gabriele is arrested.

At the end, Antonietta sits near the window and starts reading a book Gabriele has given to her (The Three Musketeers). She watches as her lover leaves the complex, escorted by fascist policemen, before turning off the light and retiring to bed: Her husband is waiting there for her to beget their seventh child, whom he wants to name Adolfo.

== Cast ==
- Sophia Loren as Antonietta Taberi
- Marcello Mastroianni as Gabriele
- John Vernon as Emanuele Taberi
- Françoise Berd as Pauletta, the caretaker
- Patrizia Basso as Romana Taberi
- Tiziano De Persio as Arnaldo Taberi
- Maurizio Di Paolantonio as Fabio Taberi
- Antonio Garibaldi as Littorio Taberi
- Vittorio Guerrieri as Umberto Taberi
- Alessandra Mussolini as Maria Luisa Taberi
- Nicole Magny as Officer's Daughter

== Themes ==
Much of the film's themes revolve around gender roles and the model of masculinity under fascist Italy. Antonietta is the donna madre, a mother figure who fulfills her feminine responsibilities within the regime by having six children, boasting one more will secure her the government bonus established for large families in 1933. The Fascist regime equates homosexuality with depopulation, and thus, Gabriele is suspected of treason. The bachelor tax of 1926 was a measure against this, and Gabriele had to pay it. While the stay-at-home mother and homosexual neighbor would seem to be an improbable pairing, both are minimized by the regime and find comfort and some sympathy in each other. At the end of the film, domestic life will continue as usual, but "inner resistance" to Fascism has been awakened.

== Production ==
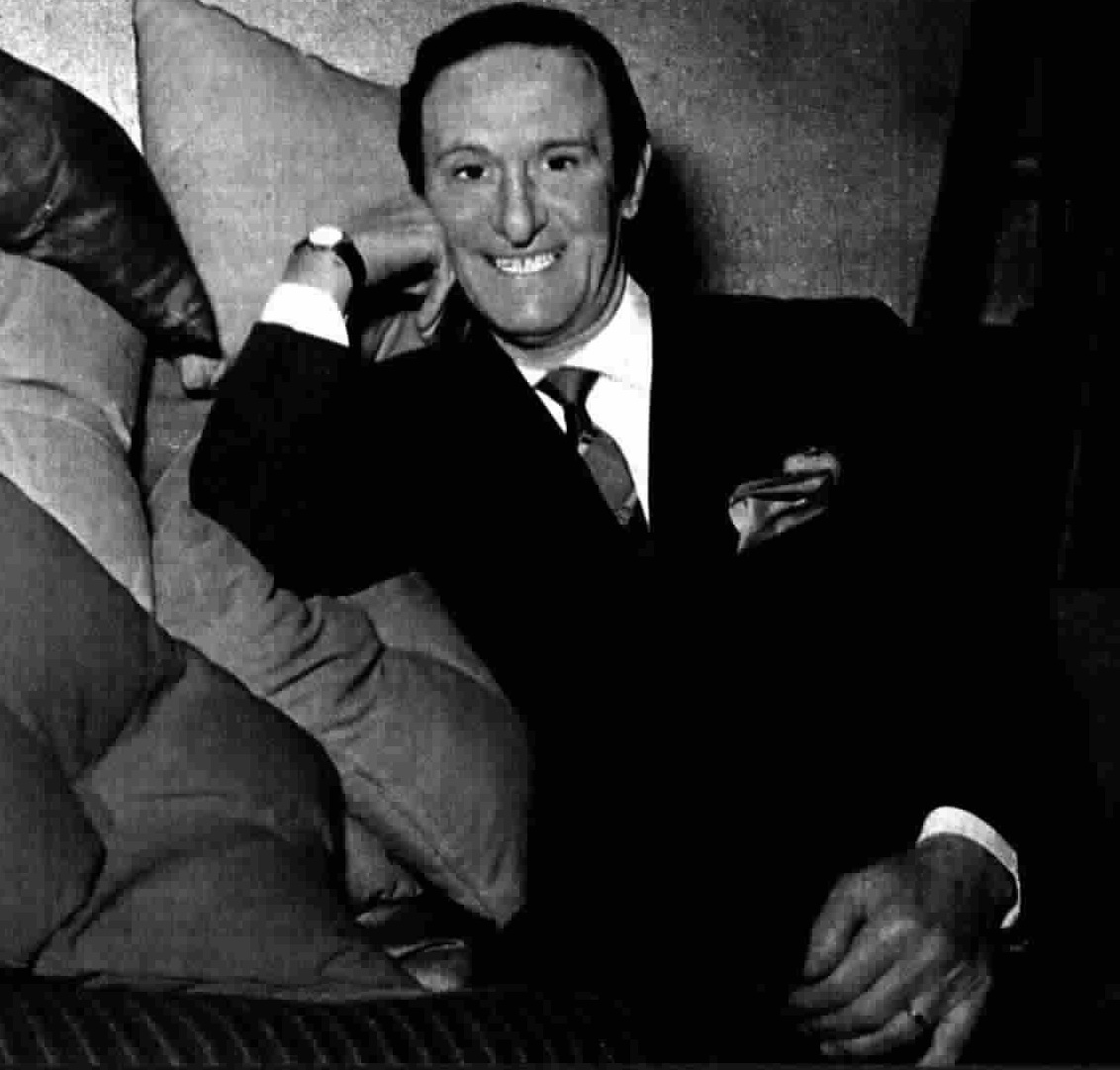
Italian broadcaster Nunzio Filogamo was an inspiration for the film.

Maurizio Costanzo, Ruggero Maccari and Ettore Scola wrote the screenplay, after Maccari had learned about an incident in Fascist Italy in which homosexuals were arrested and taken to Sardinia. Particularly, the story of broadcaster Nunzio Filogamo was an inspiration to the story, as Filogamo always had to carry a certificate stating he was not homosexual.

The actors selected for the roles defied type casting, as Marcello Mastroianni was often seen in previous roles as "the prototype of the Italian Latin lover," and Sophia Loren was perceived as a sexy Italian celebrity. Along with Il bell'Antonio and I Don't Want to Talk About It, this is one of Mastroianni's roles critiquing the Italian masculine figure as an incompetent character falling behind an evolving society.

Due to the abundance of news coverage of Hitler's visit to Rome in 1938, the filmmakers had plenty of footage to work with when writing the screenplay. The public service film The Führer's Trip to Italy was especially mined for footage. Faced with a lack of funding from Italian producers, the filmmakers persuaded investors in Canada to support the project. Canafox, a company based in Montreal, co-produced.

Several unusual cinematic techniques are used in this film. A long take scene introduces Antonietta and her family: the camera enters through the kitchen window and moves into the rooms. Deep focus is utilized in a scene where the camera is positioned in Antonietta's room, with her in the frame, and through a distant window, Gabriele can be seen moving in his house, all within the same frame simultaneously. In post-production, cinematic color grading was applied to the film, giving it a muted sepia tone throughout.

== Release ==
The film screened at the Cannes Film Festival in May 1977. It also played in New York City in September 1977.

== Reception ==
=== Critical response ===
The film received praise from critics in Italy and throughout Europe on its release. A Special Day has an approval rating of 100% on review aggregator website Rotten Tomatoes, based on 10 reviews, and an average rating of 8/10.

Vincent Canby, writing for The New York Times, appreciated the film's humor and humanity. The New York review states that while the celebrity of Sophia Loren and Marcello Mastroianni would draw audiences in, they were too glamorous to portray their characters convincingly, and thus, the film did not succeed.

In 2008, it was featured on the list of the 100 Italian films to be saved, chosen by a jury of film experts for preservation. In 2015, The Hollywood Reporter critic Deborah Young praised it as "one of the most telling films ever made about Italian Fascism," which "suggests a path that cuts through mass-think ideologies, one that anyone can follow with a little human solidarity and courage." Writing for the LGBT-oriented Out, Armond White said the film demonstrated empathy before falling into mawkishness, and Mastroianni was great. Mike D'Angelo of The A.V. Club gave it a B−, saying the film became more powerful throughout its runtime, although it has less story. D'Angelo felt it was positive that the sex between the protagonists is not claimed to convert Gabriele to heterosexuality.

=== Awards and nominations ===
The film competed for the Palme d'Or in the 1977 Cannes Film Festival, and while a few festival coordinators supported its bid, juror Roberto Rossellini successfully lobbied for Padre Padrone instead. At the 2014 Venice Film Festival, it won the award for Best Restored Film.

Award	Date of ceremony	Category	Recipient(s)	Result	Ref(s)
Academy Awards	3 April 1978	Best Actor	Marcello Mastroianni	Nominated	
Academy Awards	3 April 1978	Best Foreign Language Film	Italy	Nominated	
César Awards	4 February 1978	Best Foreign Film	Ettore Scola	Won	
David di Donatello Awards	1978	Best Director	Ettore Scola	Won	
David di Donatello Awards	1978	Best Actress	Sophia Loren	Won	
Golden Globes	28 January 1978	Best Foreign Language Film		Won	
Golden Globes	28 January 1978	Best Actor – Motion Picture Drama	Marcello Mastroianni	Nominated	
Nastro d'Argento	1978	Best Actress	Sophia Loren	Won	
Nastro d'Argento	1978	Best Screenplay	Maurizio Costanzo, Ruggero Maccari, Ettore Scola	Won	
Nastro d'Argento	1978	Best Score	Armando Trovajoli	Won	
National Board of Review	19 December 1977	Top Foreign Films		Won	

== Restoration ==
After a restoration by Cineteca Nazionale di Roma and Surf Film, the film was included in the Venice Classics section at the 2014 Venice Film Festival.

== Home media ==
In Region 1, The Criterion Collection released the film on Blu-ray on 13 October 2015.

== Stage adaptation ==
An English-language stage adaptation, titled Working on a Special Day, had its U.S. Premiere in 2013 in an Off-Broadway production by Por Piedad Teatro and The Play Company. Mexican theatre artists Ana Graham and Antonio Vega co-directed and performed the roles of Antonietta and Gabriele, respectively.

== See also ==
- List of submissions to the 50th Academy Awards for Best Foreign Language Film
- List of Italian submissions for the Academy Award for Best Foreign Language Film
