= Nijinsky (film) =

1980 film by Herbert Ross

- Theater poster
- Directed by: Herbert Ross
- Written by: Hugh Wheeler; Romola Nijinsky; Vaslav Nijinsky
- Produced by: Nora Kaye; Stanley O'Toole; Harry Saltzman
- Starring: Alan Bates; Leslie Browne; George de la Peña; Alan Badel; Colin Blakely; Carla Fracci
- Cinematography: Douglas Slocombe
- Edited by: William Reynolds
- Production company: Hera Productions
- Distributed by: Paramount Pictures
- Release date: March 20, 1980
- Running time: 125 minutes
- Country: United States
- Language: English
- Box office: $1,047,454

Nijinsky is a 1980 American biographical film directed by Herbert Ross. Hugh Wheeler wrote a screenplay that explores the later life and career of Vaslav Nijinsky; it was based largely on the premier danseur's personal diaries (a bowdlerized 1936 version was edited and published by his wife, Romola de Pulszky), and her 1934 biography of Nijinsky, largely ghostwritten by Lincoln Kirstein, who later co-founded the New York City Ballet.

== Plot ==
The film suggests Nijinsky was driven into madness by both his consuming ambition and self-enforced heterosexuality. He became involved with Romola de Pulszky, a society girl who joined impresario Sergei Diaghilev's Ballets Russes specifically to seduce Nijinsky. After a series of misunderstandings with Diaghilev, who is both his domineering mentor and possessive lover, Nijinsky succumbs to Romola's charms and marries her. After this, his gradual decline from artistic moodiness to a diagnosis of schizophrenia begins.

== Principal cast ==
- Alan Bates ..... Sergei Diaghilev
- George de la Peña ..... Vaslav Nijinsky
- Leslie Browne ..... Romola de Pulsky
- Carla Fracci ..... Tamara Karsavina
- Ronald Pickup ..... Igor Stravinsky
- Vernon Dobtcheff ..... Sergei Grigoriev
- Frederick Jaeger ..... Gabriel Astruc
- Janet Suzman ..... Emilia Marcus
- Siân Phillips ..... Lady Ripon
- Alan Badel ..... Baron de Gunzburg
- Colin Blakely ..... Vassili
- Ronald Lacey ..... Léon Bakst
- Jeremy Irons ..... Mikhail Fokine
- Anton Dolin ..... Maestro Cecchetti
- Hetty Baynes ..... Magda

== Principal production credits ==
- Producers ..... Harry Saltzman, Nora Kaye
- Musical Conductor ..... John Lanchbery
- Cinematography ..... Douglas Slocombe
- Production Design ..... John Blezard
- Art Direction ..... George Richardson
- Costume Design ..... Alan Barrett
- Ballet mistress ..... Irina Baronova

== Soundtrack ==
- "Invitation to the Dance" from Le Spectre de la Rose by Carl Maria von Weber
- Scheherazade by Nikolai Rimsky-Korsakov
- Prelude à l'Après-midi d'un faune by Claude Debussy
- Jeux by Claude Debussy
- Carnaval by Robert Schumann
- The Rite of Spring by Igor Stravinsky
- Prince Igor by Alexander Borodin
- Petrushka by Igor Stravinsky

== Production notes ==
- Harry Saltzman purchased the rights in 1969 from film director Charles Vidor's widow. Saltzman had originally promised to let Ken Russell direct the film, but due to a falling out, Saltzman hired Tony Richardson to direct. The film was canceled during pre-production. After the success of Herbert Ross's ballet film The Turning Point, Saltzman approached Ross to direct; Ross was initially unenthusiastic.
- This was Herbert Ross' second film to focus on the world of ballet. In his 1977 film he had worked with Mikhail Baryshnikov and other members of the American Ballet Theatre. Baryshnikov turned down the role of Vaslav Nijinsky as the American Ballet Theatre had promoted him to the role of artistic director.
- Nijinsky was the film debut of Jeremy Irons. It was the second to last film produced by Harry Saltzman.
- The Los Angeles Philharmonic Orchestra and the London Festival Ballet were featured in the dance sequences. David Hersey of the National Film Theatre in London designed the theatrical lighting in these scenes.

== Critical reception ==
Reception to Nijinsky is mixed. On the review aggregator website Rotten Tomatoes, 50% of 8 critics' reviews are positive, with an average rating of 4.5/10.

In his review in Time, Richard Schickel opined, "Some people will be titillated by the openness with which homosexual love is portrayed in the film. But this is mostly a slow, cautious biography, elegantly attentive to Edwardian decor and dress. It slights Nijinsky's melodramatic story and, finally, offends with its relentless reductionism. There are times when excesses of good taste become a kind of bad taste, a falsification of a subject's spirit and milieu. This is never more true than when the troubles of a genius are presented in boring and conventional terms."

Time Out London calls it "the best gay weepie since Death in Venice … the first major studio film to centre on a male homosexual relationship (albeit a doomed one) without being moralistic … director Ross and writer Hugh Wheeler … do right by their male characters (Alan Bates, in particular, is a plausibly adult Diaghilev), their grasp of the historical reconstructions seems more than competent, and their dialogue and exposition are unusually adroit. Best of all, they never show ballet for its own sake, and have the courage to keep emotional dynamics in the forefront throughout."

Channel 4 says, "What could have been a powerful period drama quickly descends into soap opera territory … but it's always watchable, and director Ross … laces the action with some well-choregraphed dance."

Director Tony Richardson, who had intended to direct the planned 1970 film on Nijinsky, considered this 1980 film a "travesty".
