= Leslie Browne =

American prima ballerina and actress

- Born: Leslie Sue Brown; June 29, 1957 (age 69); New York City, New York, U.S.
- Occupations: dancer, actress
- Spouse: Leonid Slepak

Leslie Browne (born June 29, 1957) is an American prima ballerina and actress. She was a principal dancer with the American Ballet Theatre in New York City from 1986 until 1993. She was also nominated for an Academy Award for Best Supporting Actress, as well as a Golden Globe Award at age 20, for portraying a young dancer invited to join a large New York ballet company in The Turning Point (1977).

== Personal life ==
She was born in New York, the daughter of dancers Isabel Mirrow (1928-2014) and Kelly Kingman Brown (1928-1981). Her middle name, Sue, was the name of her paternal grandmother, Sue Brown, a respected dance teacher in Mississippi. The late Nora Kaye and Herbert Ross were her godparents. She has two brothers and one sister; her brother Kevin is a film producer. At the age of seven she began dancing, and trained at her father's studio in Arizona, along with her brother Ethan and her sister Elizabeth. She earned a scholarship to study at the School of American Ballet, then joined the distinguished New York City Ballet. She also studied acting at HB Studio in Greenwich Village. She added an "e" to her last name for her stage name, considering it more feminine after being mistaken as male in a playbill.

== Ballet career ==
In 1976 she joined the American Ballet Theatre as a soloist, then became principal in 1986. She retired from the company in 1993. Since then she has made guest appearances, studied acting for three years, and made her Broadway debut in the show The Red Shoes. She has also choreographed, and taught dance. In 1997 she was awarded the Distinguished Achievement Award by the New York City Dance Alliance.

== The Turning Point ==
In 1977, a film based on her family, The Turning Point was created by Nora Kaye and Herbert Ross. Gelsey Kirkland was cast to play Emilia, but after Kirkland dropped out due to substance abuse issues as well as a dislike of the script, Ross cast Browne in the role, believing that she could play a fictionalized version of herself. She went on to be nominated for a Golden Globe Award and Academy Award for Best Supporting Actress.

== Other works ==
Browne also appeared in the dance films Nijinsky (1980) and Dancers (1987), both directed by Herbert Ross. She also appeared on the television series Happy Days as a special guest star as a dancer-girlfriend of Fonzie's.
