= Nora Kaye =

American ballet dancer and choreographer (1920–1987)

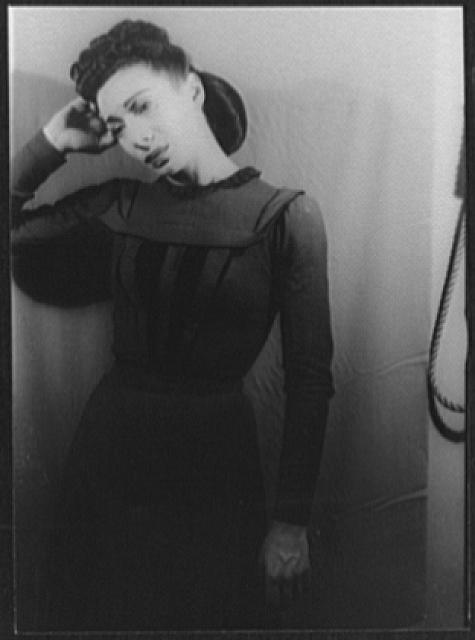
- Kaye, photographed by Carl Van Vechten
- Born: Nora Kaye Koreff; January 17, 1920; New York City, U.S.
- Died: February 28, 1987 (aged 67); Los Angeles, California, U.S.
- Occupations: Prima ballerina; film producer; choreographer
- Spouses: Michael Murray Van Beuren (m. 1943; div. 1946) Isaac Stern (m. 1948; div. 1950) Herbert Ross (m. 1959)

Nora Kaye-Ross (born Nora Kaye Koreff; January 17, 1920 – February 28, 1987) was an American prima-ballerina known for her ability to perform dramatic roles. Called the Duse of Dance after the acclaimed actress Eleonora Duse, she also worked in films as a choreographer and producer and performed on Broadway.

== Early life ==
Kaye was born Nora Koreff in New York City, the daughter of Russian Jewish immigrant parents, Louise (1895–1973) and Gregory Joseph Koreff (1893–1976). She later changed her surname to Kaye.

Her father, Gregory Koreff, was an actor with the Moscow Art Theatre and worked under Konstantin Stanislavski. At the age of five, Kaye began studying dancing under tutelage from Michel Fokine and three years later joined a ballet class at the Metropolitan Opera school where she continued her studies under Margaret Craske. When Kaye turned 15, she graduated from the Metropolitan Opera into its corps de ballet.

Kaye also studied at the School of American Ballet and with such notable teachers as Anatole Vilzak, Ludmilla Schollar and Margaret Craske.

== Career ==
In 1939, she joined the American Ballet, directed by Lucia Chase. She later became a member of the Radio City Music Hall corps de ballet and danced in several Broadway productions, including Giselle (1941), Antony Tudor's Pillar of Fire (1942), and Two's Company (1952), a revue starring Bette Davis. She worked as an assistant on the musicals I Can Get It for You Wholesale (1962), Tovarich (1963), and On a Clear Day You Can See Forever (1965).

Kaye married Michael Murray Van Beuren in 1943 (divorced) and married violinist Isaac Stern in 1948 (divorced). She was briefly engaged to Jerome Robbins in 1951. She married the film director, producer, choreographer and actor Herbert Ross in Majorca in August 1959. The couple founded Ballet of Two Worlds, which toured Europe in 1960 performing such Ross choreography as Persephone and The Dybbuk. After retirement from ballet in 1961, Kaye continued assisting her husband with many films, including Goodbye, Mr. Chips (1969), The Last of Sheila (1973), Funny Lady and The Sunshine Boys (both 1975), and The Seven-Per-Cent Solution (1976). Playwright and screenwriter Arthur Laurents claimed in his autobiography Original Story By (2000) that he and Kaye had an on-again, off-again romantic relationship after he was discharged from the U.S. Army in 1946.

Kaye's producing credits include The Turning Point (1977), Nijinsky (1980), Pennies from Heaven (1981) and The Secret of My Succe$s (1987).

Their final work together was a film Dancers.

== Death ==
Kaye-Ross died from cancer in Los Angeles at age 67, and is buried with her husband Herbert Ross in the Westwood Village Memorial Park Cemetery in Los Angeles. Their gravestone is inscribed "They Loved Each Other".
