= First Edition (film) =

1977 film

- Directed by: Helen Whitney
- Written by: DeWitt Sage; Helen Whitney
- Produced by: DeWitt Sage; Helen Whitney
- Cinematography: Ted Haimes
- Edited by: Nancy Baker
- Production company: D. L. Sage Productions for the A. S. Abell Company
- Distributed by: Films Inc.
- Release date: 1977
- Running time: 30 minutes
- Country: United States
- Language: English

First Edition is a 1977 American short documentary film about the Baltimore Sun directed by Helen Whitney. It was nominated for an Academy Award for Best Documentary Short.
