= Albert Brenner =

American production designer (1926–2022)

- Born: February 17, 1926; Brooklyn, New York City, U.S.
- Died: December 8, 2022 (aged 96)
- Occupations: Production designer Art director
- Years active: 1955–2022

Albert Brenner (February 17, 1926 – December 8, 2022) was an American production designer and art director. His numerous credits included Bullitt (1968), Monte Walsh (1970), The Goodbye Girl (1977), Coma (1978), The Presidio (1988), Pretty Woman (1990), Backdraft (1991), and Mr. Saturday Night (1992).

Born in New York, Brenner was a graduate of the New York School of Industrial Arts and he worked on department store window displays before World War II. After serving as an Army Air Force gunner during the War, he was a graduate student at the Yale Drama School and later taught scenic design, costume design and technical theatre at the University of Kansas City. After returning to New York in the early 1950s, Brenner worked in theater as an assistant to designer Samuel Leve. He designed live television programs for ABC and CBS, as well as television commercials and industrial films. Other television credits are Car 54, Where Are You (1961) and The Phil Silvers Show (1955).

Brenner was nominated for five Academy Awards in the category Best Art Direction. In 2003, he was a recipient of a Lifetime Achievement Award from the Art Directors Guild.

Brenner died on December 8, 2022, at the age of 96.

== Selected filmography ==
Brenner was nominated for five Academy Awards for Best Art Direction:

- The Sunshine Boys (1975)
- The Turning Point (1977)
- California Suite (1978)
- 2010 (1984)
- Beaches (1988)
