= Daniel A. Lomino =

American production designer and art director

- Occupations: Production designer Art director
- Years active: 1977-2008

Daniel A. Lomino is an American production designer and art director. He was nominated for an Academy Award in the category Best Art Direction for the film Close Encounters of the Third Kind.

== Selected filmography ==
- Close Encounters of the Third Kind (1977)
- Child's Play (1988)
