= Arthur Laurents =

American playwright, theatre director and screenwriter (1917–2011)

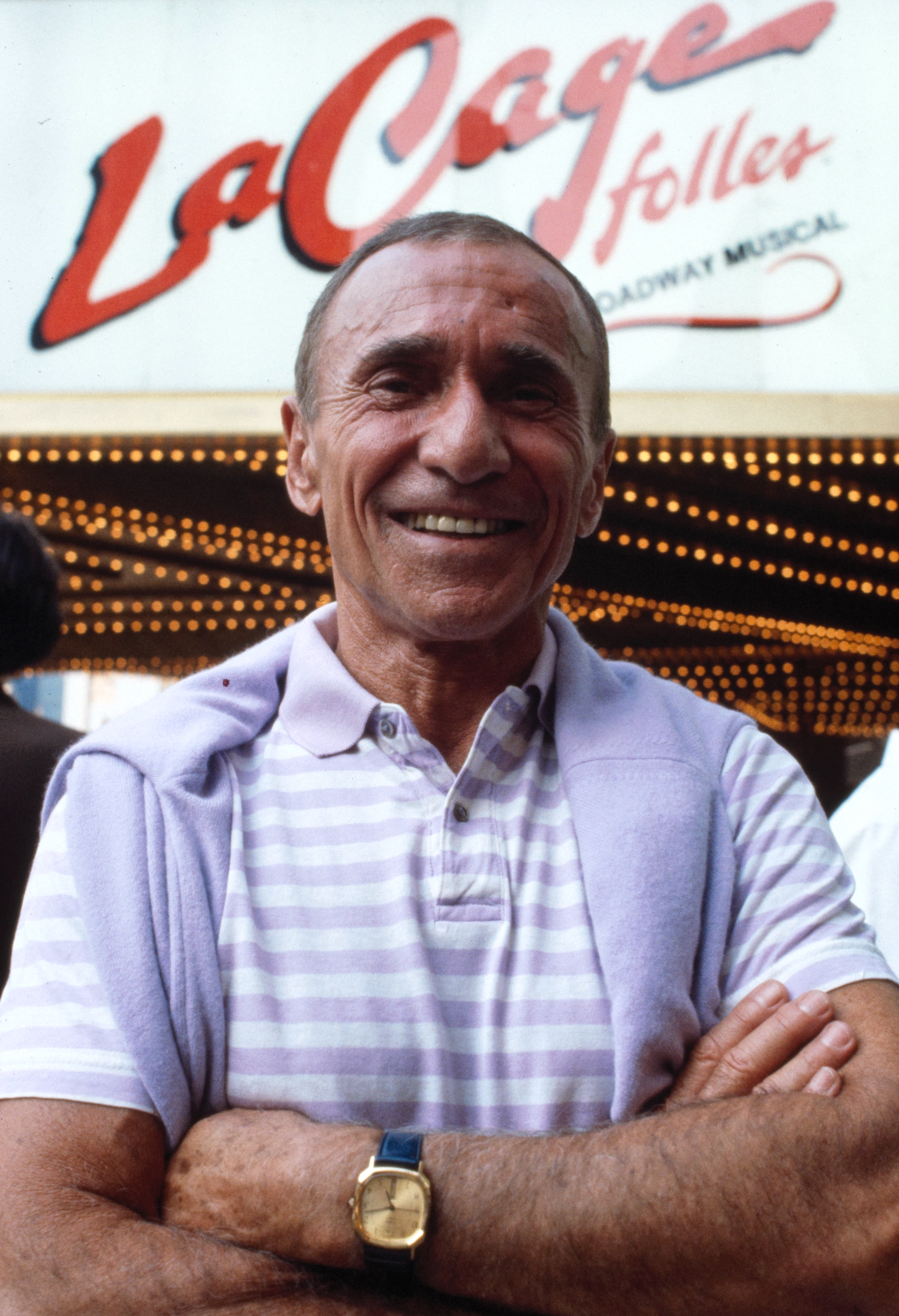
- Laurents in 1983
- Born: Arthur Levine; July 14, 1917; New York City, U.S.
- Died: May 5, 2011 (aged 93); New York City, U.S.
- Resting place: Quogue, New York
- Education: Cornell University
- Occupations: Playwright; theatre director; film producer; screenwriter
- Partner: Tom Hatcher (co. 1954; d. 2006)
- Writing career
- Language: English
- Period: 1945–2011
- Notable awards: 1968 Tony Award for Best Musical – Hallelujah, Baby! 1975 Drama Desk Award for Outstanding Director of a Musical – Gypsy; 1977 Writers Guild of America Award for Best Original Screenplay – The Turning Point; 1984 Tony Award for Best Direction of a Musical – La Cage aux Folles

Arthur Laurents (July 14, 1917 – May 5, 2011) was an American playwright, theatre director, film producer and screenwriter. With a career spanning seven decades he received numerous accolades including two Tony Awards, a Drama Desk Award, and nominations for two Academy Awards, two BAFTA Awards, and a Golden Globe Award.

After writing scripts for radio shows after college and then training films for the U.S. Army during World War II, Laurents turned to writing for Broadway, producing a body of work that includes West Side Story (1957), Gypsy (1959), and Hallelujah, Baby! (1967), winning the Tony Award for Best Musical for the latter. He directed the musical La Cage aux Folles in 1983 and received the Tony Award for Best Direction of a Musical.

Laurents also worked as a screenwriter on Hollywood films such as Alfred Hitchcock's thriller Rope (1948), Anastasia (1956), Bonjour Tristesse (1958) and Sydney Pollack's romance The Way We Were (1973). He received two Academy Award nominations for Best Picture and Best Original Screenplay for the Herbert Ross drama film The Turning Point (1977).

== Early life ==
Born Arthur Levine, Laurents was the son of middle-class Jewish parents, his father a lawyer and his mother a schoolteacher, who gave up her career when she married. He was born and raised in the Flatbush section of Brooklyn, a borough of New York City, New York, the elder of two children, and attended Erasmus Hall High School. His sister Edith suffered from chorea as a child.

His paternal grandparents were Orthodox Jews, and his mother's parents, although born Jewish, were atheists. His mother kept a kosher home for her husband's sake, but was lax about attending synagogue and observing the Jewish holidays. His bar mitzvah marked the end of Laurents' religious education and the beginning of his rejection of all fundamentalist religions, although he continued to identify himself as Jewish. However, late in life he admitted to having changed his last name from Levine to the less Jewish-sounding Laurents, "to get a job."

After graduating from Cornell University, Laurents took an evening class in radio writing at New York University. William N. Robson, his instructor, a CBS Radio director/producer, submitted his script Now Playing Tomorrow, a comedic fantasy about clairvoyance, to the network, and it was produced in the Columbia Workshop series on January 30, 1939, with Shirley Booth in the lead role. It was Laurents' first professional credit. The show's success led to him being hired to write scripts for various radio shows, among them Lux Radio Theater. Laurents' career was interrupted when he was drafted into the U.S. Army in the middle of World War II. Through a series of clerical errors, he never saw battle, but instead was assigned to the U.S. Army Pictorial Service located in a film studio in Astoria, Queens, where he wrote training films and met, among others, George Cukor and William Holden. He later was reassigned to write plays for Armed Service Force Presents, a radio show that dramatized the contributions of all branches of the armed forces.

== Career ==
=== Theatre ===
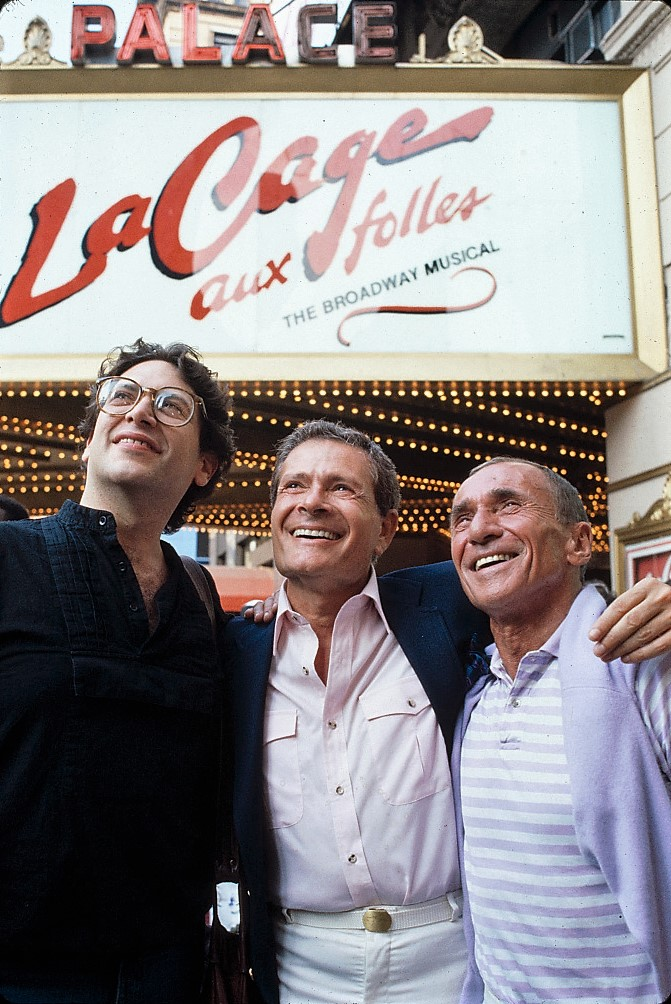
Left to right: Harvey Fierstein, Jerry Herman, Arthur Laurents, creators of the musical La Cage Aux Folles, in front of the Palace theater where it is playing, 1983

According to John Clum, "Laurents was always a mirror of his times. Through his best work, one sees a staged history of leftist, gender, and gay politics in the decades after World War II." After graduating from Cornell University in 1937, Laurents, who was gay, went to work as a writer for radio drama at CBS in New York. His military duties during World War II, which consisted of writing training films and radio scripts for Armed Service Force Presents, brought him into contact with some of the best film directors—distinguished director George Cukor directed his first script. Laurents's work in radio and film during World War II was an excellent apprenticeship for a budding playwright and screenwriter. He also had the good fortune to be based in New York City. His first stage play, Home of the Brave, was produced in 1945. The sale of the play to a film studio gave Laurents the entrée he needed to become a Hollywood screenwriter though he continued, with mixed success, to write plays. The most important of his early screenplays is his adaptation of Rope for Alfred Hitchcock.

Soon after being discharged from the Army, Laurents met ballerina Nora Kaye, and the two became involved in an on-again, off-again romantic relationship. While Kaye was on tour with Fancy Free, Laurents continued to write for the radio but was becoming discontented with the medium. He subsequently collaborated with Stephen Sondheim and Jerome Robbins on the musicals West Side Story (1957) and Gypsy (1959). In 1962, Laurents directed I Can Get It for You Wholesale, which helped to turn then-unknown Barbra Streisand into a star. His next project was the 1964 stage musical Anyone Can Whistle, which he directed and for which he wrote the book, but it proved to be an infamous flop. He later had success with the musicals Hallelujah, Baby! (1967, written for Lena Horne but ultimately starring Leslie Uggams) and La Cage aux Folles (1983), which he directed, however Nick & Nora (1991) was not successful.

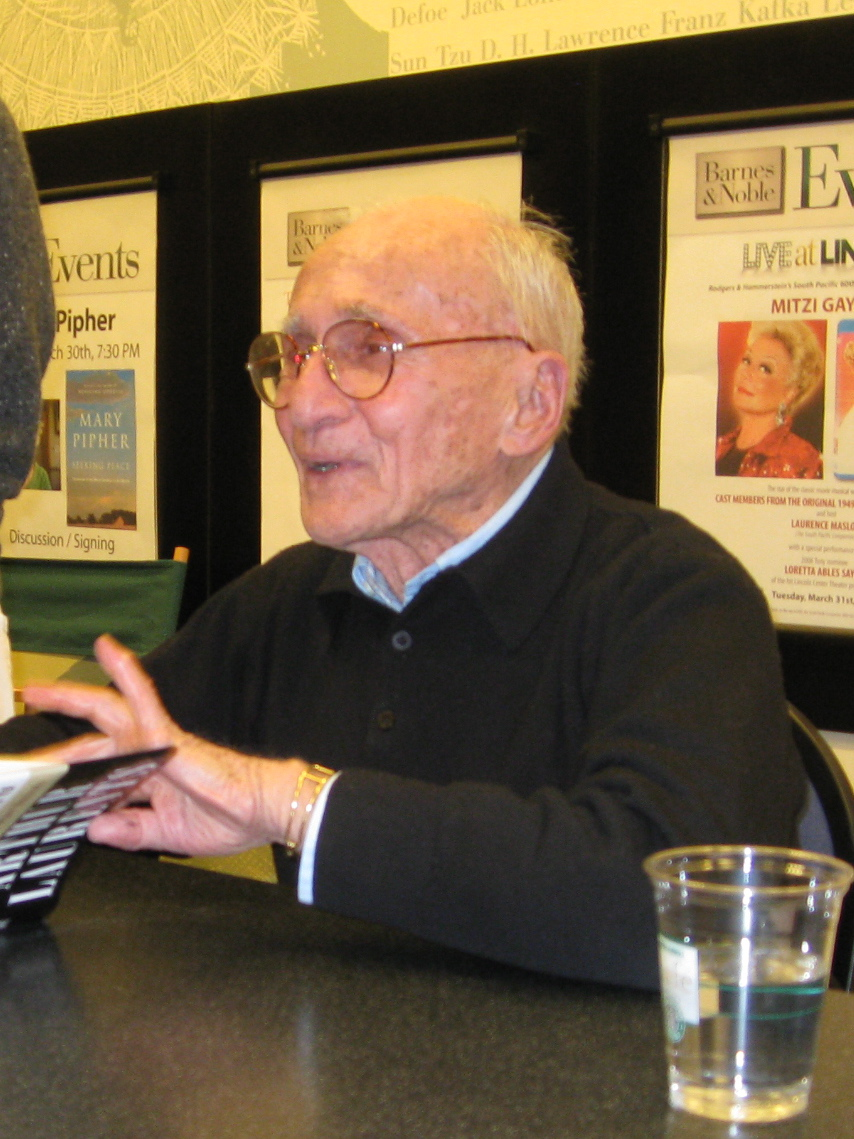
Laurents in 2009

In 2008, Laurents directed a Broadway revival of Gypsy starring Patti LuPone, and in 2009, he tackled a bilingual revival of West Side Story, with Spanish translations of some dialogue and lyrics by Lin-Manuel Miranda. While preparing West Side Story, he noted, "The musical theatre and cultural conventions of 1957 made it next to impossible for the characters to have authenticity." Following the production's March 19 opening at the Palace Theatre, Ben Brantley of The New York Times called the translations "an only partly successful experiment" and added, "Mr. Laurents has exchanged insolence for innocence and, as with most such bargains, there are dividends and losses." The national tour (2011–2012) was directed by David Saint, who was Laurents' assistant director on the Broadway production. The Spanish lyrics and dialog were reduced from about 18% of the total to about 10%.

=== Hollywood ===
Laurents' first Hollywood experience proved to be a frustrating disappointment. Director Anatole Litvak, unhappy with the script submitted by Frank Partos and Millen Brand for The Snake Pit (1948), hired Laurents to rewrite it. Partos and Brand later insisted the bulk of the shooting script was theirs, and produced carbon copies of many of the pages Laurents actually had written to bolster their claim. Having destroyed the original script and all his notes and rewritten pages after completing the project, Laurents had no way to prove most of the work was his, and the Writers Guild of America denied him screen credit. Brand later confessed he and Partos had copied scenes written by Laurents and apologized for his role in the deception. Four decades later, Laurents learned he was ineligible for WGA health benefits because he had failed to accumulate enough credits to qualify. He was short by one, the one he failed to get for The Snake Pit.

Upon hearing 20th Century Fox executives were pleased with Laurents' work on The Snake Pit, Alfred Hitchcock hired him for his next project, the film Rope starring James Stewart. Hitchcock wanted Laurents to Americanize the British play Rope (1929) by Patrick Hamilton for the screen. With his then-lover Farley Granger set to star, Laurents was happy to accept the assignment. His dilemma was how to make the audience aware of the fact the three main characters were homosexual without blatantly saying so. The Hays Office kept close tabs on his work, and the final script was so discreet that Laurents was unsure whether co-star James Stewart ever realized that his character was gay. In later years, Hitchcock asked him to script both Torn Curtain (1966) and Topaz (1969), However, Laurents, in both cases unenthused by the material, declined the offers.

Laurents also scripted Anastasia (1956) and Bonjour Tristesse (1958). The Way We Were (1973), in which he incorporated many of his own experiences, particularly those with the HUAC, reunited him with Barbra Streisand, and The Turning Point (1977), inspired in part by his love for Nora Kaye, was directed by her husband Herbert Ross. The Fox animated feature film Anastasia (1997) was based in part on his screenplay of the live-action 1956 film of the same title.

=== Blacklist ===
Because of a casual remark made by Russel Crouse, Laurents was called to Washington, D.C., to account for his political views. He explained himself to the House Un-American Activities Committee, and his appearance had no obvious impact on his career, which at the time was primarily in the theatre. When the McCarran Internal Security Act, which prohibited individuals suspected of engaging in subversive activities from obtaining a passport, was passed in 1950, Laurents and Granger immediately applied for and received passports and departed for Paris with Harold Clurman and his wife Stella Adler. Laurents and Granger remained abroad, traveling throughout Europe and northern Africa, for about 18 months.

Years earlier, Laurents and Jerome Robbins had developed Look Ma, I'm Dancin'! (1948), a stage musical about the world of ballet that ran for 188 performances on Broadway, and starred Nancy Walker and Harold Lang. Laurents left the project, however, and the musical was ultimately produced with a book by Jerome Lawrence and Robert E. Lee. When Robbins approached Paramount Pictures about directing a screen version, the studio agreed as long as Laurents was not part of the package.

It was only then that Laurents learned he officially had been blacklisted, primarily because a review of Home of the Brave had been published in the Daily Worker. He decided to return to Paris, but the State Department refused to renew his passport. Laurents spent three months trying to clear his name, and after submitting a lengthy letter explaining his political beliefs in detail, it was determined they were so idiosyncratic he could not have been a member of any subversive groups. Within a week his passport was renewed, and the following day he sailed for Europe on the Ile de France. While on board, he received a cable from Metro-Goldwyn-Mayer offering him a screenwriting assignment. The blacklisting had ended.

=== Memoirs ===
Laurents wrote Original Story By Arthur Laurents: A Memoir of Broadway and Hollywood, published in 2000. In it, he discusses his lengthy career and his many gay affairs and long-term relationships, including those with Farley Granger and Tom Hatcher (August 24, 1929 – October 26, 2006). Hatcher was an aspiring actor whom Gore Vidal suggested Laurents seek out at the Beverly Hills men's clothing store Hatcher was managing at the time. The couple remained together for 52 years until Hatcher's death on October 26, 2006.

Laurents wrote Mainly on Directing: Gypsy, West Side Story and Other Musicals, published in 2009, in which he discussed musicals he directed and the work of other directors he admired.

His last memoir titled The Rest of the Story was published posthumously in September 2012.

== Death ==
Laurents died from complications of pneumonia at his home in Manhattan on May 5, 2011, aged 93. Following a long tradition, Broadway theatre lights were dimmed at 8 p.m. on May 6, 2011, for one minute in his memory. His ashes were buried alongside those of Tom Hatcher in a memorial bench in Quogue, Long Island, New York.

== Work ==
=== Writing ===
Musicals

- West Side Story (1957) – Tony Award nomination for Best Musical
- Gypsy (1959) – Tony Award nomination for Best Musical
- Anyone Can Whistle (1964)
- Do I Hear a Waltz? (1965)
- Hallelujah, Baby! (1967) – Tony Award for Best Musical
- The Madwoman of Central Park West (1979)
- Nick & Nora (1991)

Novels

- The Way We Were (1972); Harper & Row (New York City)
- The Turning Point (1977); New American Library (New York City); OCLC 11014907

Plays

- Home of the Brave (1945)
- The Bird Cage (1950)
- The Time of the Cuckoo (1952)
- A Clearing in the Woods (1957)
- Invitation to a March (1960)
- The Enclave (1973)
- Scream (1983)
- Jolson Sings Again (1995)
- The Radical Mystique (1995)
- My Good Name (1997)
- Big Potato (2000)
- Claudia Lazlo (2001)
- Attacks on the Heart (2003)
- 2 Lives (2003)
- New Year's Eve (2009)
- Come Back, Come Back, Wherever You Are (2009)

Films

- Rope (1948)
- Caught (1949)
- Anna Lucasta (1949)
- Anastasia (1956)
- Bonjour Tristesse (1958)
- The Way We Were (1973)
- The Turning Point (1977)

=== Directing ===
- Invitation to a March (1960)
- I Can Get It for You Wholesale (1962)
- Anyone Can Whistle (1964)
- The Enclave (1973)
- Gypsy (1974) – Tony Award nomination for Best Direction of a Musical
- The Madwoman of Central Park West (1979)
- La Cage aux Folles (1983) – Tony Award for Best Direction of a Musical
- Birds of Paradise (1987)
- Gypsy (1989)
- Nick & Nora (1991)
- The Radical Mystique (1995)
- West Side Story (1998) – Prince Edward Theatre, London
- Gypsy (2008) – Tony Award nomination for Best Director of a Musical
- West Side Story (2009)
- Come Back, Come Back, Wherever You Are (2009)

== Accolades ==
Year	Award	Category	Work	Result	Ref.
1977	Academy Awards	Best Picture	The Turning Point	Nominated	
1977	Academy Awards	Best Screenplay – Written Directly for the Screen	The Turning Point	Nominated	
1957	British Academy Film Awards	Best British Screenplay	Anastasia	Nominated	
1958	British Academy Film Awards	Best British Screenplay	Bonjour Tristesse	Nominated	
1975	Drama Desk Awards	Outstanding Director of a Musical	Gypsy	Won	
1948	Edgar Allan Poe Awards	Best Motion Picture	Rope	Nominated	
1977	Golden Globe Awards	Best Screenplay – Motion Picture	The Turning Point	Nominated	
1999	National Board of Review Awards	Best Screenplay (for career achievement)	—N/a	Won	
1975	Tony Awards	Best Direction of a Musical	Gypsy	Nominated	
1984	Tony Awards	Best Direction of a Musical	La Cage aux Folles	Won	
2008	Tony Awards	Best Direction of a Musical	Gypsy	Nominated	
1973	Writers Guild of America Awards	Best Drama – Written Directly for the Screen	The Way We Were	Nominated	
1977	Writers Guild of America Awards	Best Drama – Written Directly for the Screen	The Turning Point	Won	

=== Legacy ===
A new award was established in 2010, The Laurents/Hatcher Foundation Award. This is awarded annually "for an un-produced, full-length play of social relevance by an emerging American playwright." The Laurents/Hatcher Foundation will give $50,000 to the writer with a grant of $100,000 towards production costs at a nonprofit theatre. The first award will be given in 2011.

== See also ==
- List of Jewish American playwrights
- List of novelists from the United States
- List of people from Brooklyn, New York
- List of playwrights from the United States
- List of theatre directors
