= Jerry Jost =

American sound engineer

- Born: October 5, 1929; Detroit, Michigan, U.S.
- Died: December 30, 2014 (aged 85); Wenatchee, Washington, U.S.
- Occupation: Sound engineer
- Years active: 1970–1991

Gerald Gordon Jost (October 5, 1929 – December 30, 2014) was an American sound engineer. He was nominated for an Academy Award in the category Best Sound for the film The Turning Point.

== Selected filmography ==
- The Turning Point (1977)
