= Of Time, Tombs and Treasures =

1977 American short documentary film

- Produced by: James R. Messenger; Paul Raimondi
- Production company: Exxon
- Distributed by: Modern Talking Picture Service
- Release date: 1977
- Running time: 29 minutes
- Country: United States
- Language: English

Of Time, Tombs and Treasures is a 1977 American short documentary film about the discovery the Tomb of the Tutankamun. Produced by James R. Messenger, the film was nominated for an Academy Award for Best Documentary Short.
