= Herbert Ross =

American choreographer and film & theatre director (1927–2001)

- Born: Herbert David Ross; May 13, 1927; New York City, New York, U.S.
- Died: October 9, 2001 (aged 74); New York City, New York, U.S.
- Resting place: Westwood Village Memorial Park Cemetery
- Occupations: Film director, theatre director, film producer, theatre producer, choreographer, dancer
- Years active: 1942–1995
- Spouses: Nora Kaye (m. 1959; died 1987) Lee Radziwill (m. 1988; div. 2001)

Herbert David Ross (May 13, 1927 – October 9, 2001) was an American choreographer, director, and producer, who was active in both theatre and film. He was known for his work on Broadway as a choreographer for productions for Barbra Streisand, Stephen Sondheim, Richard Rodgers, and Arthur Laurents. His credits included A Tree Grows in Brooklyn in 1951, Finian's Rainbow in 1960, I Can Get It for You Wholesale in 1962, and Do I Hear a Waltz? in 1965. He was nominated for a Tony Award for Best Choreography for Anyone Can Whistle in 1964.

On screen, he was known for directing musicals and comedies such as Goodbye, Mr. Chips (1969), The Owl and the Pussycat (1970), Play It Again, Sam (1972), The Sunshine Boys, Funny Lady (both 1975), The Goodbye Girl (1977), California Suite (1978), and Pennies From Heaven (1981). His later films included Footloose (1984), and Steel Magnolias (1989). For the drama The Turning Point (1977), he received two Academy Award nominations for Best Picture and Best Director and received the Golden Globe Award for Best Director.

== Early life ==
Ross was born on May 13, 1927, in Brooklyn, New York, the son of Louis Chester Ross, a postal clerk, and his wife Martha (née Grundfast). His parents were Russian-Jewish immigrants. When Ross was nine, his mother died and his father moved the family to Miami and opened a luncheonette.

After dropping out of high school, Ross initially went to New York to pursue an acting career. However, during his work there, he was captivated by dance and went on to study it.

== Career ==
=== Theatre ===
Dancer

In 1942, Ross' stage debut came as "Third Witch" in a touring company of Macbeth. The next year brought his first Broadway performance credits with Something for the Boys, as a dancer. Ross was a dancer in Follow the Girls (1943–44), Laffing Room Only (1944–45), Beggar's Holiday (1946–47), and Look, Ma, I'm Dancin'!.

Choreographer

By 1950, he was a choreographer with the American Ballet Theatre and choreographed his first Broadway production, the Arthur Schwartz-Dorothy Fields musical adaptation of A Tree Grows in Brooklyn (1951). For TV he choreographed All Star Revue, The Milton Berle Show, and The Steve Allen Plymouth Show. Ross's first film assignment came as an uncredited choreographer on Carmen Jones (1954).

Back on Broadway he choreographed House of Flowers (1954) for Peter Brook, and The Body Beautiful (1958). He choreographed some TV specials: The Jerry Lewis Show (1957), Wonderful Town (1958), Meet Me in St Louis (1959) and A Christmas Festival (1959). On Broadway Ross directed and choreographed a revival of Finian's Rainbow (1960). In 1965, Ross choreographed the original production of On a Clear Day, You Can See Forever and, without credit, took over the helm from the director of record, Robert Lewis, when the musical ran into trouble in Boston during its pre-Broadway tryout tour.

Ross went to England where he choreographed the feature film The Young Ones (1961), starring Cliff Richard. He returned to Broadway to be musical director on The Gay Life (1961–62) and I Can Get It for You Wholesale (1962), the latter directed by Arthur Laurents and starring Barbra Streisand. He choreographed The Bacchantes (1961) in Italy. Ross then choreographed a second Cliff Richard musical in England, Summer Holiday (1963). On Broadway he choreographed Tovarich (1963) with Vivien Leigh and Anyone Can Whistle (1964) with Laurents. For TV he did musical numbers for The Fantasticks (1964), The Bell Telephone Hour, Delia Scala Show (1962), Rinaldo in campo (1963), and The Nut House!! (1964) and staged numbers for the films Inside Daisy Clover (1965), Who's Afraid of Virginia Woolf? (1966) and Doctor Dolittle (1967).

On Broadway Ross directed and choreographed Kelly (1965), and choreographed Do I Hear a Waltz? (1965) and On a Clear Day You Can See Forever (1965-66). He did some additional staging on The Apple Tree (1966–67) directed by Mike Nichols. Ross was choreographer and director of musical numbers for Funny Girl (1968), produced by Ray Stark.

=== Film ===
His film directorial debut came with the musical version of Goodbye, Mr. Chips (1969), made by MGM-British, with Peter O'Toole and Petula Clark. It was produced by Arthur P. Jacobs who had made Doctor Dolittle two years prior, and just like that film, Goodbye, Mr. Chips was a box-office disappointment. However, Ross' second feature as director, The Owl and the Pussycat (1970), was a big hit. The film was produced by Ray Stark and stars Streisand.

Ross did T.R. Baskin (1971) then Play It Again, Sam (1972), the latter produced by Jacobs and starring Woody Allen based on his play. Ross made The Last of Sheila (1973) co-written by Stephen Sondheim and Anthony Perkins, and Funny Lady (1975) with Stark and Streisand. Ross directed The Sunshine Boys (1975) based on a play and script by Neil Simon, starting a long collaboration between the two men; Stark produced. Ross directed The Seven-Per-Cent Solution (1976), and The Turning Point (1977); Ross produced the latter.

Ross had two big hits with Simon scripts produced by Stark, The Goodbye Girl (1977) and California Suite (1978). Ross returned to Broadway to direct Neil Simon's Chapter Two (1977–79). After doing the ballet film Nijinsky (1980) he directed Simon's I Ought to Be in Pictures (1980–81) on Broadway. He followed this with Pennies from Heaven (1981) and the film version of I Ought to Be in Pictures (1982). His last film with Simon was Max Dugan Returns (1983).

=== Later career ===
Ross had a huge hit with Footloose (1984). He followed this with two comedies, Protocol (1984) with Goldie Hawn and The Secret of My Success (1987) with Michael J. Fox. Less successful was Dancers (1987).

Ross had one last big hit with another play adaptation, Steel Magnolias (1989). In the 1990s, he directed My Blue Heaven (1990), True Colors (1991), Undercover Blues (1993) and Boys on the Side (1995).

== Personal life ==
In 1959, he married Nora Kaye, a ballerina, with whom he produced four films. In 1987, his wife Nora died of cancer.

In September 1988, he married for the second time to Lee Radziwiłł, the younger sister of former First Lady Jacqueline Kennedy Onassis. The marriage ended in divorce in 2001, shortly before his death. In 2013, Radziwiłł described their relationship as follows:

He was certainly different from anybody else I'd been involved with, and the film world sounded exciting. Well, it wasn't. I hated Hollywood, and the provincialism of the industry ... Herbert had been married to the ballerina Nora Kaye until she died, and unbeknownst to me was still obsessed by her. It was 'Nora said this, Nora did it like that, Nora liked brown and orange.'

=== Death ===
On October 9, 2001, Ross died from heart failure in New York City. A memorial was held for him at the Majestic Theater on West 44th Street in New York where Leslie Browne, Barbara Cook, Arthur Laurents, Marsha Mason, Mike Nichols and Mary-Louise Parker spoke of Ross. He was interred with Kaye in the Westwood Village Memorial Park Cemetery in Los Angeles.

The 2011 remake of Footloose was dedicated to Ross' memory.

== Stage credits ==
Year	Title	Contributed to				Role	Notes
Year	Title	Directing	Choreo.	Acting	Dancing	Role	Notes
1942	Macbeth	No	No	Yes	No	3rd Witch	Touring
1943-44	Something for the Boys	No	No	No	Yes		
1944-46	Follow the Girls	No	No	Yes	Yes	Dancing Boy	
1944-45	Laffing Room Only	No	No	No	No	Ensemble member	
1946-47	Beggar's Holiday	No	No	Yes	Yes	Ensemble member	
1948	Look, Ma, I'm Dancin'!	No	No	Yes	Yes	Ensemble member	
1951	A Tree Grows in Brooklyn	No	Yes	No	No		
1952	Three Wishes for Jamie	No	Yes	No	No		
1954-55	House of Flowers	No	Yes	No	No		
1955-56	The Amazing Adele	No	Yes	No	No		
1958	The Body Beautiful	No	Yes	No	No		
1960	Finian's Rainbow	Yes	Yes	No	No		
1961-62	The Gay Life	No	Yes	No	No		Musical staging
1962	I Can Get It for You Wholesale	No	Yes	No	No		Musical staging
1963	Hot Spot	Yes	Yes	No	No		
1963	Tovarich	No	Yes	No	No		
1964	Anyone Can Whistle	No	Yes	No	No		
1964	Dylan	No	Yes	No	No		
1964	Anyone Can Whistle	No	Yes	No	No		
1965	Do I Hear a Waltz?	No	Yes	No	No		
1965	Kelly	Yes	Yes	No	No		
1965-65	On a Clear Day You Can See Forever	No	Yes	No	No		
1966-67	The Apple Tree	No	Yes	No	No		Addt. Musical staging
1977-79	Chapter Two	Yes	No	No	No		
1980-81	I Ought to Be in Pictures	Yes	No	No	No		
1985	Follies	Yes	No	No	No		
1985	The Boys of Winter	Yes	No	No	No		Left during previews
1995	Anyone Can Whistle	Yes	No	No	No		

== Filmography ==
=== Film ===
Year	Title	Contributed to			Note
Year	Title	Directing	Producing	Choreo.	Note
1954	Carmen Jones	No	No	Yes	Uncredited
1961	The Bacchantes	No	No	Yes	
1961	The Young Ones	No	No	Yes	
1963	Summer Holiday	No	No	Yes	
1965	Inside Daisy Clover	No	No	Yes	Musical staging
1966	Who's Afraid of Virginia Woolf?	No	No	Yes	Uncredited
1967	Doctor Dolittle	No	No	Yes	Musical staging
1968	Funny Girl	No	No	Yes	
1969	Goodbye, Mr. Chips	Yes	No	No	Directorial Debut
1970	The Owl and the Pussycat	Yes	No	No	
1971	T.R. Baskin	Yes	No	No	
1972	Play It Again, Sam	Yes	No	No	
1973	The Last of Sheila	Yes	Yes	No	
1975	The Sunshine Boys	Yes	No	No	
1975	Funny Lady	Yes	No	Yes	Musical staging
1976	The Seven-Per-Cent Solution	Yes	Yes	No	
1977	The Turning Point	Yes	Yes	No	
1977	The Goodbye Girl	Yes	No	No	
1978	California Suite	Yes	No	No	
1980	Nijinsky	Yes	No	No	
1981	Pennies From Heaven	Yes	Yes	No	
1982	I Ought to Be in Pictures	Yes	Yes	No	
1983	Max Dugan Returns	Yes	Yes	No	
1984	Footloose	Yes	No	No	
1984	Protocol	Yes	No	No	
1987	The Secret of My Success	Yes	Yes	No	
1987	Dancers	Yes	No	No	
1989	Steel Magnolias	Yes	No	No	
1990	My Blue Heaven	Yes	Yes	No	
1991	True Colors	Yes	Yes	No	
1991	Soapdish	No	Executive	No	
1993	Undercover Blues	Yes	No	No	
1995	Boys on the Side	Yes	Yes	No	

=== Television ===
Year	Title	Contributed to			Notes
Year	Title	Directing	Producing	Choreo.	Notes
1953	All Star Revue	No	No	Yes	
1953-54	Texco Berle Theater	No	No	Yes	
1954	Wonderful Town	Yes	No	No	Television film
1954	The Paul Winchell Show	No	No	Yes	
1954-56	The Martha Raye Show	No	No	Yes	
1956	The Steve Allen Show	No	No	Yes	
1957	The Jerry Lewis Show	No	No	Yes	Special
1959	Meet Me in St. Louis	No	No	Yes	Television film
1959	A Christmas Festival	No	No	Yes	Television film
1963	Rinaldo in campo	No	No	Yes	Television film
1964-66	The Bell Telephone Hour	No	Yes	No	6 episodes
1964	The Nut House!!	No	No	Yes	Special
1964	Hallmark Hall of Fame	No	No	Yes	Episode: "The Fantasticks"
1964	Perry Como's Kraft Music Hall	No	No	Yes	
1986	Great Performances	Yes	No	No	Episode: "Follies in Concert"
1994	Placido Domingo's Tales from the Opera	Yes	No	No	Episode: "La bohème"

== Awards and nominations ==
Institution	Year	Category	Work	Result
American Choreography Awards	1997	Career Achievement Award	—N/a	Won
Academy Awards	1977	Best Picture	The Turning Point	Nominated
Academy Awards	1977	Best Director	The Turning Point	Nominated
David di Donatello	1978	Best Foreign Director	The Goodbye Girl	Nominated (Note: Tied with Ridley Scott for The Duellists.)
Directors Guild of America Awards	1977	Outstanding Directing - Feature Film	The Turning Point	Nominated
Giffoni Film Festival	1971	Golden Gryphon	Goodbye, Mr. Chips	Won
Golden Globe Awards	1977	Best Director	The Turning Point	Won
Los Angeles Film Critics Association Awards	1977	Best Director	The Turning Point	Won
Moscow International Film Festival	1995	Golden St. George	Boys on the Side	Nominated
Tokyo International Film Festival	1987	Grand Prix	Dancers	Nominated
Tony Award	1964	Best Choreography	Anyone Can Whistle	Nominated
Valladolid International Film Festival	1976	Best Film	The Sunshine Boys	Nominated

Awards and nominations for Ross' directed motion pictures
Year	Film	Academy Awards		BAFTAs		Golden Globes	
Year	Film	Nominations	Wins	Nominations	Wins	Nominations	Wins
1969	Goodbye, Mr. Chips	2				3	1
1970	The Owl and the Pussycat					1	
1975	Funny Lady	5				6	
1975	The Sunshine Boys	4	1	2		5	4
1976	The Seven-Per-Cent Solution	2					
1977	The Turning Point	11		1		6	2
1977	The Goodbye Girl	5	1	3	1	5	4
1978	California Suite	3	1	1		2	1
1981	Pennies from Heaven	3				3	1
1984	Footloose	2				1	
1987	The Secret of My Success					1	
1989	Steel Magnolias	1		1		2	1
Total		38	3	8	1	35	14

=== Directed Academy Award Performances ===
Under Ross' direction, these actors have earned Oscar nominations and wins for their performances in these respective roles.

Year	Performer	Film	Result
Best Actor Oscar
1970	Peter O'Toole	Goodbye, Mr. Chips	Nominated
1976	Walter Matthau	The Sunshine Boys	Nominated
1978	Richard Dreyfuss	The Goodbye Girl	Won
Best Actress Oscar
1978	Anne Bancroft	The Turning Point	Nominated
1978	Shirley MacLaine	The Turning Point	Nominated
1978	Marsha Mason	The Goodbye Girl	Nominated
Best Supporting Actor Oscar
1976	George Burns	The Sunshine Boys	Won
1978	Mikhail Baryshnikov	The Turning Point	Nominated
Best Supporting Actress Oscar
1978	Leslie Browne	The Turning Point	Nominated
1978	Quinn Cummings	The Goodbye Girl	Nominated
1979	Maggie Smith	California Suite	Won
1990	Julia Roberts	Steel Magnolias	Nominated
