= Dancers (film) =

1987 film by Herbert Ross

- Directed by: Herbert Ross
- Written by: Sarah Kernochan
- Based on: Giselle by Adolphe Adam; Jean Coralli; Jules Perrot
- Produced by: Menahem Golan; Yoram Globus
- Starring: Mikhail Baryshnikov; Alessandra Ferri; Leslie Browne; Thomas Rall; Lynn Seymour; Victor Barbee; Julie Kent; Mariangela Melato
- Cinematography: Ennio Guarnieri
- Edited by: William Reynolds
- Music by: Pino Donaggio
- Production company: The Cannon Group
- Distributed by: Cannon Film Distributors
- Release date: October 9, 1987
- Running time: 82 minutes
- Country: United States
- Language: English
- Budget: $7 million
- Box office: $1,190,416

Dancers is a 1987 film directed by Herbert Ross and stars Mikhail Baryshnikov and Julie Kent. The film received scathing reviews upon release.

== Plot ==
The story revolves around a ballet dancer who is planning to make a film version of the ballet Giselle, and how his romance with a young woman parallels the plotline of the ballet.

== Cast ==
- Mikhail Baryshnikov as Tony
- Alessandra Ferri as Francesca
- Leslie Browne as Nadine
- Tommy Rall as Patrick
- Lynn Seymour as Muriel
- Victor Barbee as Wade
- Mariangela Melato as Countess
- Julie Kent as Lisa
- Gianmarco Tognazzi as Guido
