= Paul Wells (sound engineer) =

American sound engineer (1930–2005)

- Born: February 12, 1930
- Died: September 1, 2005 (aged 75)
- Occupation: Sound engineer
- Years active: 1977-1988

Paul Wells (February 12, 1930 – September 1, 2005) was an American sound engineer. He was nominated for two Academy Awards in the category Best Sound.

== Selected filmography ==
- The Turning Point (1977)
- The Rose (1979)
