= Cinema Audio Society Award for Outstanding Achievement in Sound Mixing for a Motion Picture – Animated =

Annual US film award

- Country: United States
- Presented by: Cinema Audio Society
- Currently held by: Ken Gombos, Leff Lefferts, Gary A. Rizzo, Alan Meyerson and Richard Duarte – The Wild Robot (2024)

The Cinema Audio Society Award for Outstanding Achievement in Sound Mixing for a Motion Picture – Animated is an annual award given by the Cinema Audio Society to live-action motion picture sound mixer for their outstanding achievements in sound mixing. The award came to its current title in 2013, when feature motion pictures were separated into two categories; achievement in live-action sound mixing, and achievement in animated sound mixing (later, documentary features would get their own category as well). Before this, the category was labeled Outstanding Achievement in Sound Mixing for Motion Pictures, and was given annually starting in 1994 (for films released the previous year).

== Winners and nominees ==
=== 1990s ===
Outstanding Achievement in Sound Mixing for Motion Pictures

Year	Film	Nominees
1993 (1st)	The Fugitive	Scott D. Smith (production mixer); Donald O. Mitchell, Michael Herbick, Frank A. Montaño (re-recording mixers)
1993 (1st)	Cliffhanger	Tim Cooney (production mixer); Bob Beemer, Michael Minkler (re-recording mixers)
1993 (1st)	In the Line of Fire	Willie D. Burton (production mixer); Kevin O'Connell, Rick Kline (re-recording mixers)
1993 (1st)	Jurassic Park	Ron Judkins (production mixer); Gary Rydstrom, Gary Summers, Shawn Murphy (re-recording mixers)
1993 (1st)	Schindler's List	Ron Judkins (production mixer); Andy Nelson, Steve Pederson, Scott Millan (re-recording mixers)
1994 (2nd)	Forrest Gump	William B. Kaplan (production mixer); Randy Thom, Tom Johnson, Dennis S. Sands (re-recording mixers)
1994 (2nd)	Clear and Present Danger	Art Rochester (production mixer); Donald O. Mitchell, Michael Herbick, Frank A. Montaño (re-recording mixers)
1994 (2nd)	The Lion King	Doc Kane (original dialogue mixer); Terry Porter, Mel Metcalfe, David J. Hudson (re-recording mixers)
1994 (2nd)	Speed	David MacMillan (production mixer); Gregg Landaker, Steve Maslow, Bob Beemer (re-recording mixers)
1994 (2nd)	True Lies	Lee Orloff (production mixer); Michael Minkler, Bob Beemer (re-recording mixers)
1995 (3rd)	Apollo 13	David MacMillan (production mixer); Rick Dior, Steve Pederson, Scott Millan (re-recording mixers)
1995 (3rd)	Braveheart	Brian Simmons (production mixer); Andy Nelson, Scott Millan, Anna Behlmer (re-recording mixers)
1995 (3rd)	Crimson Tide	William B. Kaplan (production mixer); Kevin O'Connell, Rick Kline, Gregory H. Watkins (re-recording mixers)
1995 (3rd)	Heat	Lee Orloff (production mixer); Chris Jenkins, Ron Bartlett, Mark Smith (re-recording mixers)
1995 (3rd)	Jumanji	Rob Young (production mixer); Randy Thom, Gary Summers, Shawn Murphy (re-recording mixers)
1996 (4th)	The English Patient	Christopher Newman (production mixer); Walter Murch, Mark Berger, David Parker (re-recording mixers)
1996 (4th)	The Birdcage	Gene Cantamessa (production mixer); Lee Dichter (re-recording mixer)
1996 (4th)	Independence Day	Jeff Wexler (production mixer); Chris Carpenter, Bob Beemer, Bill W. Benton (re-recording mixers)
1996 (4th)	The Rock	Keith A. Wester (production mixer); Kevin O'Connell, Greg P. Russell (re-recording mixers)
1996 (4th)	Twister	Geoffrey Patterson (production mixer); Steve Maslow, Gregg Landaker, Kevin O'Connell (re-recording mixers)
1997 (5th)	James Cameron's Titanic	Mark Ulano (production mixer); Gary Rydstrom, Tom Johnson, Gary Summers (re-recording mixers)
1997 (5th)	Air Force One	Keith A. Wester (production mixer); Paul Massey, Doug Hemphill, Rick Kline (re-recording mixers)
1997 (5th)	Contact	William B. Kaplan (production mixer); Randy Thom, Tom Johnson, Dennis S. Sands (re-recording mixers)
1997 (5th)	L.A. Confidential	Kirk Francis (production mixer); Andy Nelson, Anna Behlmer (re-recording mixers)
1997 (5th)	Men in Black (MIB)	Peter Kurland (production mixer); Skip Lievsay, Lee Dichter, Michael Barry (re-recording mixers)
1998 (6th)	Saving Private Ryan	Ron Judkins (production mixer); Gary Rydstrom, Gary Summers, Andy Nelson (re-recording mixers)
1998 (6th)	Armageddon	Keith A. Wester (production mixer); Kevin O'Connell, Greg P. Russell (re-recording mixers)
1998 (6th)	The Horse Whisperer	Tod A. Maitland (production mixer); Tom Johnson, Lora Hirschberg, Dennis S. Sands (re-recording mixers)
1998 (6th)	The Mask of Zorro	Pud Cusack (production mixer); Kevin O'Connell, Greg P. Russell (re-recording mixers)
1998 (6th)	The X-Files	Geoffrey Patterson (production mixer); Andy Nelson, Anna Behlmer (re-recording mixers)
1999 (7th)	The Matrix	David Lee (production mixer); John T. Reitz, Gregg Rudloff, David E. Campbell (re-recording mixers)
1999 (7th)	American Beauty	Richard Van Dyke (production mixer); Scott Millan, Bob Beemer (re-recording mixers)
1999 (7th)	Any Given Sunday	Peter J. Devlin (production mixer); Patrick Cyccone Jr., Michael Keller, Tom Fleischman (re-recording mixers)
1999 (7th)	The Sixth Sense	Allan Byer (production mixer); Reilly Steele, Michael Kirchberger (re-recording mixers)
1999 (7th)	Star Wars: Episode I – The Phantom Menace	John Midgley (production mixer); Gary Rydstrom, Tom Johnson, Shawn Murphy (re-recording mixers)

=== 2000s ===
Year	Film	Nominees
2000 (8th)	Gladiator	Ken Weston (production mixer); Scott Millan, Bob Beemer (re-recording mixers)
2000 (8th)	Cast Away	William B. Kaplan (production mixer); Randy Thom, Tom Johnson, Dennis S. Sands (re-recording mixers)
2000 (8th)	The Patriot	Lee Orloff (production mixer); Kevin O'Connell, Greg P. Russell (re-recording mixers)
2000 (8th)	The Perfect Storm	Keith A. Wester (production mixer); John T. Reitz, David E. Campbell, Gregg Rudloff (re-recording mixers)
2000 (8th)	U-571	Ivan Sharrock (production mixer); Steve Maslow, Gregg Landaker, Rick Kline (re-recording mixers)
2001 (9th)	The Lord of the Rings: The Fellowship of the Ring	Hammond Peek (production mixer); Christopher Boyes, Michael Semanick, Gethin Creagh (re-recording mixers)
2001 (9th)	Black Hawk Down	Chris Munro (production mixer); Michael Minkler, Myron Nettinga (re-recording mixers)
2001 (9th)	Moulin Rouge!	Guntis Sics (production mixer); Andy Nelson, Anna Behlmer, Roger Savage (re-recording mixers)
2001 (9th)	Pearl Harbor	Peter J. Devlin (production mixer); Kevin O'Connell, Greg P. Russell (re-recording mixers)
2001 (9th)	Shrek	Charleen Richards (production mixer); Andy Nelson, Anna Behlmer (re-recording mixers)
2002 (10th)	Road to Perdition	John Pritchett (production mixer); Scott Millan, Bob Beemer (re-recording mixers)
2002 (10th)	Catch Me if You Can	Ron Judkins (production mixer); Andy Nelson, Anna Behlmer (re-recording mixers)
2002 (10th)	Chicago	David Lee (production mixer); Michael Minkler, Dominick Tavella (re-recording mixers)
2002 (10th)	The Lord of the Rings: The Two Towers	Hammond Peek (production mixer); Christopher Boyes, Michael Semanick, Michael Hedges (re-recording mixers)
2002 (10th)	Spider-Man	Ed Novick (production mixer); Kevin O'Connell, Greg P. Russell (re-recording mixers)
2003 (11th)	Master and Commander: The Far Side of the World	Art Rochester (production mixer); Paul Massey, Doug Hemphill (re-recording mixers)
2003 (11th)	The Last Samurai	Jeff Wexler (production mixer); Andy Nelson, Anna Behlmer (re-recording mixers)
2003 (11th)	The Lord of the Rings: The Return of the King	Hammond Peek (production mixer); Christopher Boyes, Michael Semanick, Michael Hedges (re-recording mixers)
2003 (11th)	Pirates of the Caribbean: The Curse of the Black Pearl	Lee Orloff (production mixer); Christopher Boyes, David Parker, David E. Campbell (re-recording mixers)
2003 (11th)	Seabiscuit	Tod A. Maitland (production mixer); Andy Nelson, Anna Behlmer (re-recording mixers)
2004 (12th)	The Aviator	Petur Hliddal (production mixer), Tom Fleischman (re-recording mixer)
2004 (12th)	The Bourne Supremacy	Kirk Francis (production mixer); Scott Millan, Bob Beemer (re-recording mixers)
2004 (12th)	Finding Neverland	David Crozier (production mixer); Lora Hirschberg, Brandon Proctor (re-recording mixers)
2004 (12th)	Ray	Steve Cantamessa (production mixer); Scott Millan, Greg Orloff, Bob Beemer (re-recording mixers)
2004 (12th)	Spider-Man 2	Joseph Geisinger (production mixer); Kevin O'Connell, Greg P. Russell, Jeffrey J. Haboush (re-recording mixers)
2005 (13th)	Walk the Line	Peter Kurland (production mixer); Paul Massey, Doug Hemphill (re-recording mixers)
2005 (13th)	Crash	Richard Van Dyke (production mixer); Marc Fishman, Adam Jenkins, Rick Ash (re-recording mixers)
2005 (13th)	King Kong	Hammond Peek (production mixer); Christopher Boyes, Michael Semanick, Michael Hedges (re-recording mixers)
2005 (13th)	Memoirs of a Geisha	John Pritchett (production mixer); Kevin O'Connell, Greg P. Russell, Rick Kline (re-recording mixers)
2005 (13th)	War of the Worlds	Ron Judkins (production mixer); Andy Nelson, Anna Behlmer (re-recording mixers)
2006 (14th)	Dreamgirls	Willie D. Burton (production mixer); Michael Minkler, Bob Beemer (re-recording mixers)
2006 (14th)	Babel	José Antonio García (production mixer); Jon Taylor, Christian P. Minkler (re-recording mixers)
2006 (14th)	Blood Diamond	Ivan Sharrock (production mixer); Andy Nelson, Anna Behlmer (re-recording mixers)
2006 (14th)	Flags of Our Fathers	Walt Martin (production mixer); John T. Reitz, Gregg Rudloff, David E. Campbell (re-recording mixers)
2006 (14th)	Pirates of the Caribbean: Dead Man's Chest	Lee Orloff (production mixer); Christopher Boyes, Paul Massey (re-recording mixers)
2007 (15th)	No Country for Old Men	Peter Kurland (production mixer); Skip Lievsay, Craig Berkey, Greg Orloff (re-recording mixer)
2007 (15th)	The Bourne Ultimatum	Kirk Francis (production mixer); Scott Millan, David Parker (re-recording mixers)
2007 (15th)	Into the Wild	Edward Tise (production mixer); Lora Hirschberg, Michael Minkler (re-recording mixers)
2007 (15th)	300	Patrick Rousseau (production mixer); Chris Jenkins, Frank A. Montaño (re-recording mixers)
2007 (15th)	Transformers	Peter J. Devlin (production mixer); Kevin O'Connell, Greg P. Russell (re-recording mixers)
2008 (16th)	Slumdog Millionaire	Resul Pookutty (production mixer); Ian Tapp, Richard Pryke (re-recording mixers)
2008 (16th)	The Dark Knight	Ed Novick (production mixer); Lora Hirschberg, Gary A. Rizzo (re-recording mixers)
2008 (16th)	Iron Man	Mark Ulano (production mixer); Christopher Boyes, Lora Hirschberg (re-recording mixers)
2008 (16th)	Quantum of Solace	Chris Munro (production mixer); Mike Prestwood Smith, Mark Taylor (re-recording mixers)
2008 (16th)	WALL-E	Ben Burtt (original dialogue mixer); Tom Myers, Michael Semanick (re-recording mixers)
2009 (17th)	The Hurt Locker	Ray Beckett (production mixer), Paul N. J. Ottosson (re-recording mixer)
2009 (17th)	James Cameron's Avatar	Tony Johnson (production mixer); Christopher Boyes, Gary Summers, Andy Nelson (re-recording mixer)
2009 (17th)	District 9	Ken Saville (production mixer); Michael Hedges, Gilbert Lake (re-recording mixers)
2009 (17th)	Star Trek	Peter J. Devlin (production mixer); Andy Nelson, Anna Behlmer, Paul Massey (re-recording mixers)
2009 (17th)	Transformers: Revenge of the Fallen	Geoffrey Patterson (production mixer); Greg P. Russell, Gary Summers (re-recording mixers)

=== 2010s ===
Year	Film	Nominees
2010 (18th)	True Grit	Peter Kurland (production mixer); Skip Lievsay, Craig Berkey, Greg Orloff (re-recording mixers)
2010 (18th)	Black Swan	Ken Ishii (production mixer); Dominick Tavella, Craig Henighan (re-recording mixers)
2010 (18th)	Inception	Ed Novick (production mixer); Lora Hirschberg, Gary A. Rizzo (re-recording mixers)
2010 (18th)	Shutter Island	Petur Hliddal (production mixer), Tom Fleischman (re-recording mixer)
2010 (18th)	The Social Network	Mark Weingarten (production mixer); Ren Klyce, Michael Semanick, David Parker (re-recording mixers)
2011 (19th)	Hugo	John Midgley (production mixer), Tom Fleischman (re-recording mixer), Simon Rhodes (scoring mixer)
2011 (19th)	Hanna	Roland Winke (production mixer); Christopher Scarabosio, Craig Berkey (re-recording mixers); Andrew Dudman (scoring mixer)
2011 (19th)	Moneyball	Ed Novick (production mixer); Deb Adair, Ron Bochar, David Giammarco (re-recording mixers); Brad Haehnel (scoring mixer)
2011 (19th)	Pirates of the Caribbean: On Stranger Tides	Lee Orloff (production mixer); Christopher Boyes, Paul Massey (re-recording mixer); Alan Meyerson (scoring mixer)
2011 (19th)	Super 8	Mark Ulano (production mixer); Tom Johnson, Andy Nelson, Anna Behlmer (re-recording mixers); Dan Wallin (scoring mixer)

Outstanding Achievement in Sound Mixing for a Motion Picture – Animated

Year	Film	Nominees
2012 (20th)	Brave	Bobby Johansen (original dialogue mixer); Gary Rydstrom, Tom Johnson (re-recording mixers); Andrew Dudman (scoring mixer); Frank Rinella (foley mixer)
2012 (20th)	Dr. Seuss' The Lorax	Carlos Sotolongo (original dialogue mixer); Randy Thom, Gary A. Rizzo (re-recording mixers); Shawn Murphy (scoring mixer); Glen Gathard (foley mixer)
2012 (20th)	Frankenweenie	Doc Kane (original dialogue mixer); Christopher Boyes, Michael Semanick, Tom Johnson (re-recording mixers); Dennis S. Sands (scoring mixer); Frank Rinella (foley mixer)
2012 (20th)	Rise of the Guardians	Tighe Sheldon (original dialogue mixer); Andy Nelson, James Bolt (re-recording mixers); Peter Cobbin (scoring mixer); Kyle Rochlin (foley mixer)
2012 (20th)	Wreck-It Ralph	Doc Kane (original dialogue mixer); Gary A. Rizzo, David E. Fluhr (re-recording mixers); Alan Meyerson (scoring mixer); Frank Rinella (foley mixer)
2013 (21st)	Frozen	Gabriel Guy (original dialogue mixer/re-recording mixer); David E. Fluhr (re-recording mixer); Casey Stone (scoring mixer); Mary Jo Lang (foley mixer)
2013 (21st)	The Croods	Tighe Sheldon (original dialogue mixer); Randy Thom, Gary A. Rizzo (re-recording mixers); Dennis Sands (scoring mixer); Corey Tyler (foley mixer)
2013 (21st)	Despicable Me 2	Charleen Richards (original dialogue mixer); Christopher Scarabosio, Gary A. Rizzo, Tom Johnson (re-recording mixers); Alan Meyerson (scoring mixer); Tony Eckert (foley mixer)
2013 (21st)	Monsters University	Doc Kane (original dialogue mixer); Michael Semanick, Gary Summers (re-recording mixers); David Boucher (scoring mixer); Corey Tyler (foley mixer)
2013 (21st)	Walking with Dinosaurs	Chris Navarro (original dialogue mixer); Andrew Koyama, Martyn Zub (re-recording mixers); Rupert Coulson (scoring mixer); Sam Rogers (foley mixer)
2014 (22nd)	Big Hero 6	Gabriel Guy (original dialogue mixer/re-recording mixer); David E. Fluhr (re-recording mixer); Alan Meyerson (scoring mixer); Mary Jo Lang (foley mixer)
2014 (22nd)	The Boxtrolls	Carlos Sotolongo (original dialogue mixer); Tom Myers, Ren Klyce, Nathan Nance (re-recording mixers); Nick Wollage (scoring mixer); Mary Jo Lang (foley mixer)
2014 (22nd)	How to Train Your Dragon 2	Tighe Sheldon (original dialogue mixer); Randy Thom, Brandon Proctor (re-recording mixers); Shawn Murphy (re-recording mixer/scoring mixer); Corey Tyler (foley mixer)
2014 (22nd)	The Lego Movie	Thomas J. O'Connell (original dialogue mixer); Michael Semanick, Gregg Rudloff, Wayne Pashley (re-recording mixers); Brad Haehnel (scoring mixer); Ryan Squires (foley mixer)
2014 (22nd)	Penguins of Madagascar	Tighe Sheldon (original dialogue mixer); Paul N. J. Ottosson (re-recording mixer); Dennis S. Sands (scoring mixer); Randy Singer (foley mixer)
2015 (23rd)	Inside Out	Doc Kane (original dialogue mixer); Tom Johnson, Michael Semanick (re-recording mixers); Joel Iwataki (scoring mixer); Mary Jo Lang (foley mixer)
2015 (23rd)	The Good Dinosaur	Vince Caro (original dialogue mixer); (original dialogue mixer); Tom Johnson, Michael Semanick (re-recording mixers); Brad Haehnel (scoring mixer); Kyle Rochlin (foley mixer)
2015 (23rd)	Hotel Transylvania 2	Howard London (original dialogue mixer); Michael Semanick, Tom Johnson (re-recording mixers); Brad Haehnel (scoring mixer); Randy Singer (foley mixer)
2015 (23rd)	Minions	Carlos Sotolongo (original dialogue mixer); Christopher Scarabosio, Gary A. Rizzo (re-recording mixers); Shawn Murphy (scoring mixer); Corey Tyler (foley mixer)
2015 (23rd)	The Peanuts Movie	Bill Higley (original dialogue mixer); Randy Thom, Lora Hirschberg, Leff Lefferts (re-recording mixers); Shawn Murphy (scoring mixer); Casey Stone (scoring mixer); Jason Butler (foley mixer)
2016 (24th)	Finding Dory	Doc Kane (original dialogue mixer); Michael Semanick, Nathan Nance (re-recording mixers); Thomas Vicari (scoring mixer); Scott Curtis (foley mixer)
2016 (24th)	Kubo and the Two Strings	Carlos Sotolongo (original dialogue mixer); Tim Chau, Tim LeBlanc (re-recording mixers); Nick Wollage (scoring mixer); Darrin Mann (foley mixer)
2016 (24th)	Moana	Paul McGrath (original dialogue mixer); David E. Fluhr, Gabriel Guy (re-recording mixers); David Boucher (scoring mixer); Scott Curtis (foley mixer)
2016 (24th)	The Secret Life of Pets	Carlos Sotolongo (original dialogue mixer); David Acord, Gary A. Rizzo (re-recording mixers); Frank Wolf (scoring mixer); Jason Butler (foley mixer)
2016 (24th)	Zootopia	Paul McGrath (original dialogue mixer); David E. Fluhr, Gabriel Guy (re-recording mixers); Joel Iwataki (scoring mixer); Scott Curtis (foley mixer)
2017 (25th)	Coco	Vince Caro (original dialogue mixer); Christopher Boyes, Michael Semanick (re-recording mixers); Joel Iwataki (scoring mixer); Blake Collins (foley mixer)
2017 (25th)	Cars 3	Doc Kane (original dialogue mixer); Tom Myers, Michael Semanick, Nathan Nance (re-recording mixers); David Boucher (scoring mixer); Blake Collins (foley mixer)
2017 (25th)	Despicable Me 3	Carlos Sotolongo (original dialogue mixer); Randy Thom, Tim Nielsen, Brandon Proctor (re-recording mixers); Greg Hayes (scoring mixer); Scott Curtis (foley mixer)
2017 (25th)	Ferdinand	Bill Higley (original dialogue mixer); Randy Thom, Lora Hirschberg, Leff Lefferts (re-recording mixers); Shawn Murphy (scoring mixer); Scott Curtis (foley mixer)
2017 (25th)	The Lego Batman Movie	Jason Oliver (original dialogue mixer); Michael Semanick, Gregg Landaker, Wayne Pashley (re-recording mixers); Stephen Lipson (scoring mixer); Lisa Simpson (foley mixer)
2018 (26th)	Isle of Dogs	Darrin Moore (original dialogue mixer); Christopher Scarabosio, Wayne Lemmer (re-recording mixers); Xavier Forcioli, Simon Rhodes (scoring mixers); Peter Persaud (foley mixer)
2018 (26th)	Dr. Seuss' The Grinch	Bill Higley, Michael Miller (original dialogue mixers); Gary A. Rizzo, Juan Peralta (re-recording mixers); Noah Scot Snyder (scoring mixer); Blake Collins (foley mixer)
2018 (26th)	Incredibles 2	Vince Caro, Doc Kane (original dialogue mixers); Michael Semanick, Nathan Nance (re-recording mixers); Joel Iwataki (scoring mixer); Scott Curtis (foley mixer)
2018 (26th)	Ralph Breaks the Internet	Doc Kane, Paul McGrath (original dialogue mixers); David E. Fluhr, Gabriel Guy (re-recording mixers); Alan Meyerson (scoring mixer); Scott Curtis (foley mixer)
2018 (26th)	Spider-Man: Into the Spider-Verse	Brian Smith, Aaron Hasson, Howard London (original dialogue mixers); Michael Semanick, Tony Lamberti (re-recording mixers); Sam Okell (scoring mixer); Randy Singer (foley mixer)
2019 (27th)	Toy Story 4	Doc Kane (original dialogue mixer); Michael Semanick, Nathan Nance (re-recording mixers); David Boucher (scoring mixer); Vince Caro (ADR mixer); Scott Curtis (foley mixer)
2019 (27th)	Abominable	Tighe Sheldon (original dialogue mixer), Myron Nettinga (re-recording mixer), Nick Wollage (scoring mixer), David Jobe (foley mixer)
2019 (27th)	Frozen 2	Paul McGrath (original dialogue mixer); David E. Fluhr, Gabriel Guy (re-recording mixers); David Boucher (song mixer); Greg Hayes (scoring mixer); Doc Kane (ADR mixer); Scott Curtis (foley mixer)
2019 (27th)	How to Train Your Dragon: The Hidden World	Tighe Sheldon (original dialogue mixer); Gary A. Rizzo, Scott R. Lewis, Shawn Murphy (re-recording mixer); Blake Collins (foley mixer)
2019 (27th)	The Lion King	Ron Judkins (original dialogue mixer); Christopher Boyes, Lora Hirschberg (re-recording mixers); Alan Meyerson (scoring mixer); Blake Collins (foley mixer)

=== 2020s ===
Year	Film	Nominees
2020 (28th)	Soul	Vincent Caro (original dialogue mixer); Ren Klyce, David Parker (re-recording mixers); David Boucher, Atticus Ross (scoring mixers); Bobby Johanson (ADR mixer); Scott Curtis (foley mixer)
2020 (28th)	The Croods: A New Age	Tighe Sheldon (original dialogue mixer); Christopher Scarabosio, Leff Lefferts (re-recording mixers); Alan Meyerson (scoring mixer); Scott Curtis, Richard Duarte (foley mixers)
2020 (28th)	Onward	Vincent Caro, Doc Kane (original dialogue mixers); Michael Semanick, Juan Peralta (re-recording mixers); Brad Haehnel (scoring mixer); Scott Curtis (foley mixer)
2020 (28th)	A Shaun the Sheep Movie: Farmageddon	Dom Boucher (dialogue/ADR mixer); Chris Burdon, Gilbert Lake, Adrian Rhodes (re-recording mixers); Alan Meyerson (scoring mixer); Ant Bayman (foley mixer)
2020 (28th)	Trolls World Tour	Tighe Sheldon (original dialogue mixer); Paul Hackner, Scott Millan (re-recording mixers); Christopher Fogel (scoring mixer); Randy K. Singer (foley mixer)
2021 (29th)	Encanto	Paul McGrath (original dialogue mixer); David Boucher, David E. Fluhr, Gabriel Guy (re-recording mixers); Alvin Wee (scoring mixer); Doc Kane (ADR mixer); Scott Curtis (foley mixer)
2021 (29th)	Luca	Vince Caro (original dialogue mixer); Christopher Scarabosio, Tony Villaflor (re-recording mixers); Greg Hayes (scoring mixer); Jason Butler, Richard Duarte (foley mixers)
2021 (29th)	The Mitchells vs. the Machines	Aaron Hasson, Howard London (original dialogue mixers); Tony Lamberti, Michael Semanick (re-recording mixers); John Sanacore (foley mixer)
2021 (29th)	Raya and the Last Dragon	Paul McGrath (original dialogue mixer); David E. Fluhr, Gabriel Guy (re-recording mixers); Alan Meyerson(scoring mixer); Doc Kane (ADR mixer); Scott Curtis (foley mixer)
2021 (29th)	Sing 2	Edward Sutton (production mixer); Gary A. Rizzo, Juan Peralta (re-recording mixers); Alan Meyerson (scoring mixer); Robert Edwards (ADR mixer); Frank Rinella (foley mixer)
2022 (30th)	Guillermo del Toro's Pinocchio	Jon Taylor, Frank Montaño (re-recording mixer); Peter Cobbin (scoring mixer); Tavish Grade (foley mixer)
2022 (30th)	Lightyear	Paul McGrath (original dialogue mixer); Ren Klyce, Stephen Urata (re-recording mixers); Warren Brown (scoring mixer); Scott Curtis (foley mixer)
2022 (30th)	Minions: The Rise of Gru	Tim Nielsen, Steve Slanec (re-recording mixer); Alan Meyerson (scoring mixer); Jason Butler (foley mixer)
2022 (30th)	Puss in Boots: The Last Wish	Tighe Sheldon, Ken Gombos (original dialogue mixers); Julian Slater, Greg P. Russell (re-recording mixers); Alan Meyerson, Seth Waldmann (scoring mixers); Ryan Squires (foley mixer)
2022 (30th)	Turning Red	Vince Caro (original dialogue mixer); Ren Klyce, Stephen Urata (re-recording mixers); Chris Fogel (scoring mixer); Scott Curtis (foley mixer)
2023 (31st)	Spider-Man: Across the Spider-Verse	Brian Smith, Aaron Hasson, Howard London (original dialogue mixers); Michael Semanick, Juan Peralta (re-recording mixers); Sam Okell (scoring mixer); Randy K. Singer (foley mixer)
2023 (31st)	The Boy and the Heron	Kôji Kasamatsu (original dialogue mixer/re-recording mixer)
2023 (31st)	Elemental	Vince Caro, Paul McGrath (original dialogue mixers); Ren Klyce, Stephen Urata (re-recording mixers); Thomas Vicari (scoring mixer); Scott Curtis (foley mixer)
2023 (31st)	The Super Mario Bros. Movie	Carlos Sotolongo (original dialogue mixer); Pete Horner, Juan Peralta (re-recording mixers); Casey Stone (scoring mixer); Doc Kane (ADR mixer); Richard Durante (foley mixer)
2023 (31st)	Teenage Mutant Ninja Turtles: Mutant Mayhem	Doc Kane (original dialogue mixer); Michael Semanick, Mark Mangini (re-recording mixers); Trent Reznor, Atticus Ross (scoring mixers); Chris Cirino (ADR mixer); Chelsea Body (foley mixer)
2024 (32nd)	The Wild Robot	Ken Gombos (original dialogue mixer); Leff Lefferts, Gary A. Rizzo (re-recording mixers); Alan Meyerson (scoring mixer); Richard Duarte (foley mixer)
2024 (32nd)	Inside Out 2	Vince Caro (original dialogue mixer); Ren Klyce, Stephen Urata (re-recording mixers); Warren Brown (scoring mixer); Doc Kane (ADR mixer),;Leff Lefferts (foley mixer)
2024 (32nd)	Moana 2	Gabriel Guy (original dialogue mixer/re-recording mixer); David Fluhr (re-recording mixer); David Boucher (scoring mixer); Doc Kane (ADR mixer); Richard Duarte (foley mixer)
2024 (32nd)	Mufasa: The Lion King	Doc Kane (original dialogue mixer); Onnalee Blank, Greg P. Russell (re-recording mixers); Chris Fogel, David Boucher (scoring mixers); Gary Turnbull (ADR mixer); Mikel Parraga-Wills (foley mixer)
2024 (32nd)	Wallace & Gromit: Vengeance Most Fowl	Will Norie (original dialogue mixer); Chris Burdon, Gilbert Lake (re-recording mixers); Simon Rhodes (scoring mixer); Nick Roberts (ADR mixer); Adrian Rhodes (foley mixer)
