= 48th British Academy Film Awards =

1995 film awards ceremony

- Date: 23 April 1995
- Site: London Palladium
- Hosted by: Billy Connolly

Highlights
- Best Film: Four Weddings and a Funeral
- Best British Film: Shallow Grave
- Best Actor: Hugh Grant; Four Weddings and a Funeral
- Best Actress: Susan Sarandon; The Client
- Most awards: Four Weddings and a Funeral (4)
- Most nominations: Four Weddings and a Funeral (11)

The 48th British Academy Film Awards, more commonly known as the BAFTAs, took place on 23 April 1995 at the London Palladium in London, honouring the best national and foreign films of 1994. Presented by the British Academy of Film and Television Arts, accolades were handed out for the best feature-length film and documentaries of any nationality that were screened at British cinemas in 1994.

Mike Newell's Four Weddings and a Funeral won the award for Best Film. It also won the awards for Best Director (Mike Newell), Actor (Hugh Grant) and Supporting Actress (Kristin Scott Thomas). Pulp Fiction won the awards for Best Supporting Actor (Samuel L. Jackson) and Original Screenplay. Susan Sarandon won the BAFTA Award for Best Actress for her role in The Client.

== Winners and nominees ==
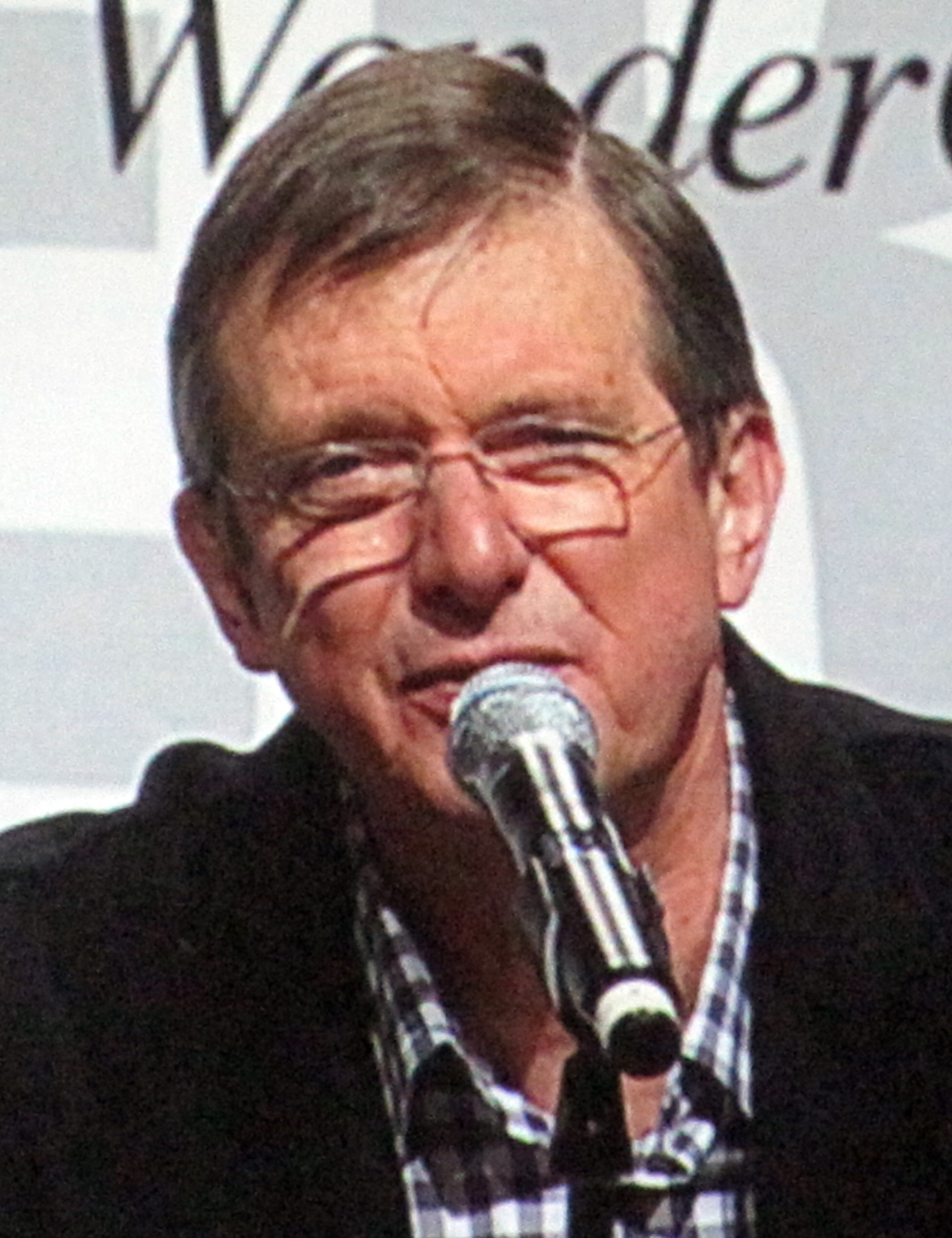
Mike Newell, Best Director winner

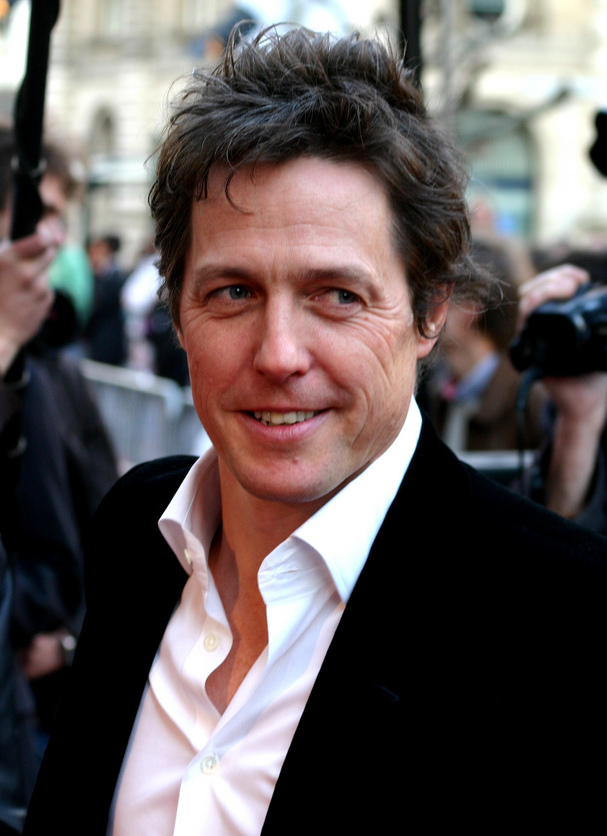
Hugh Grant, Best Actor winner

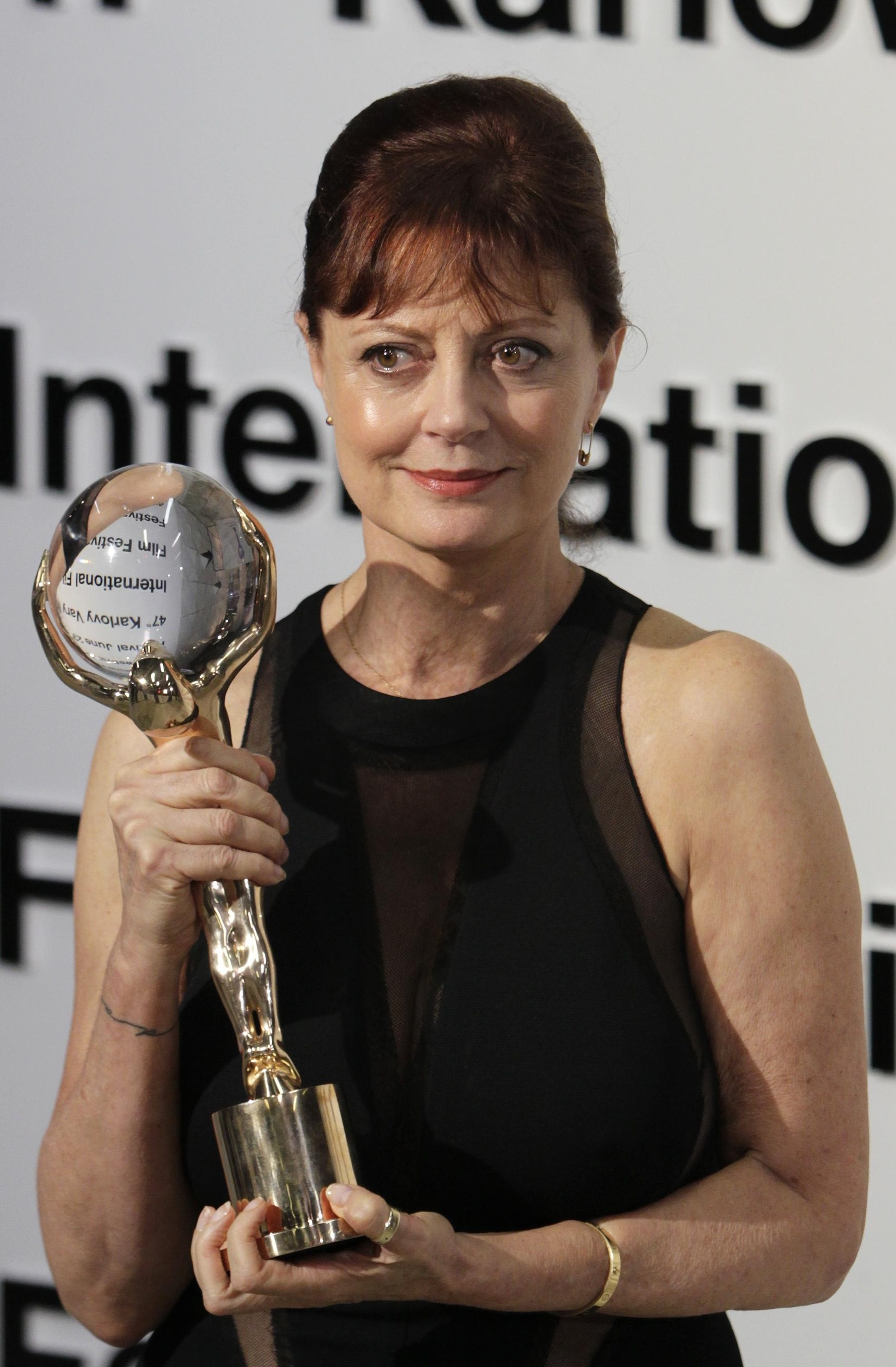
Susan Sarandon, Best Actress winner

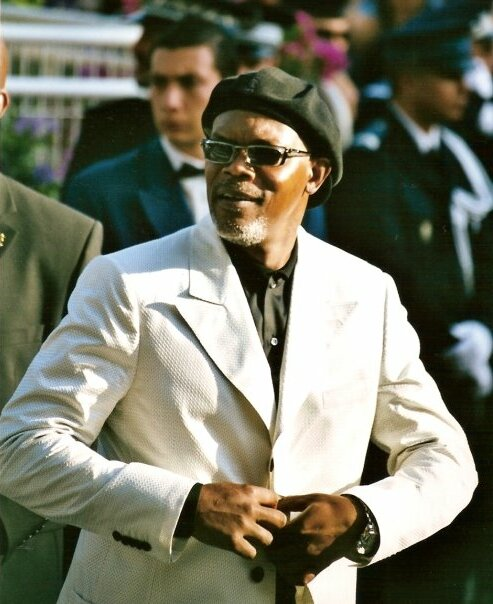
Samuel L. Jackson, Best Supporting Actor winner

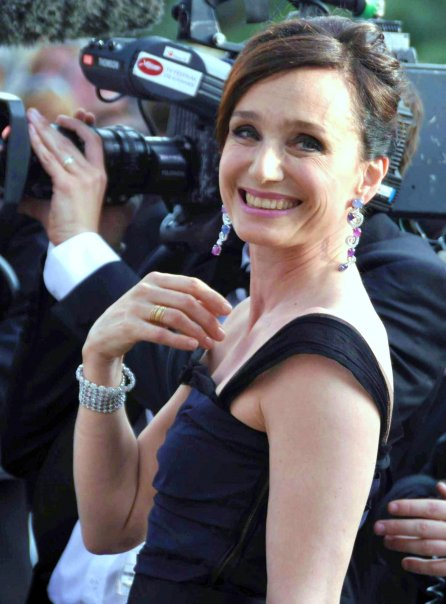
Kristin Scott Thomas, Best Supporting Actress winner

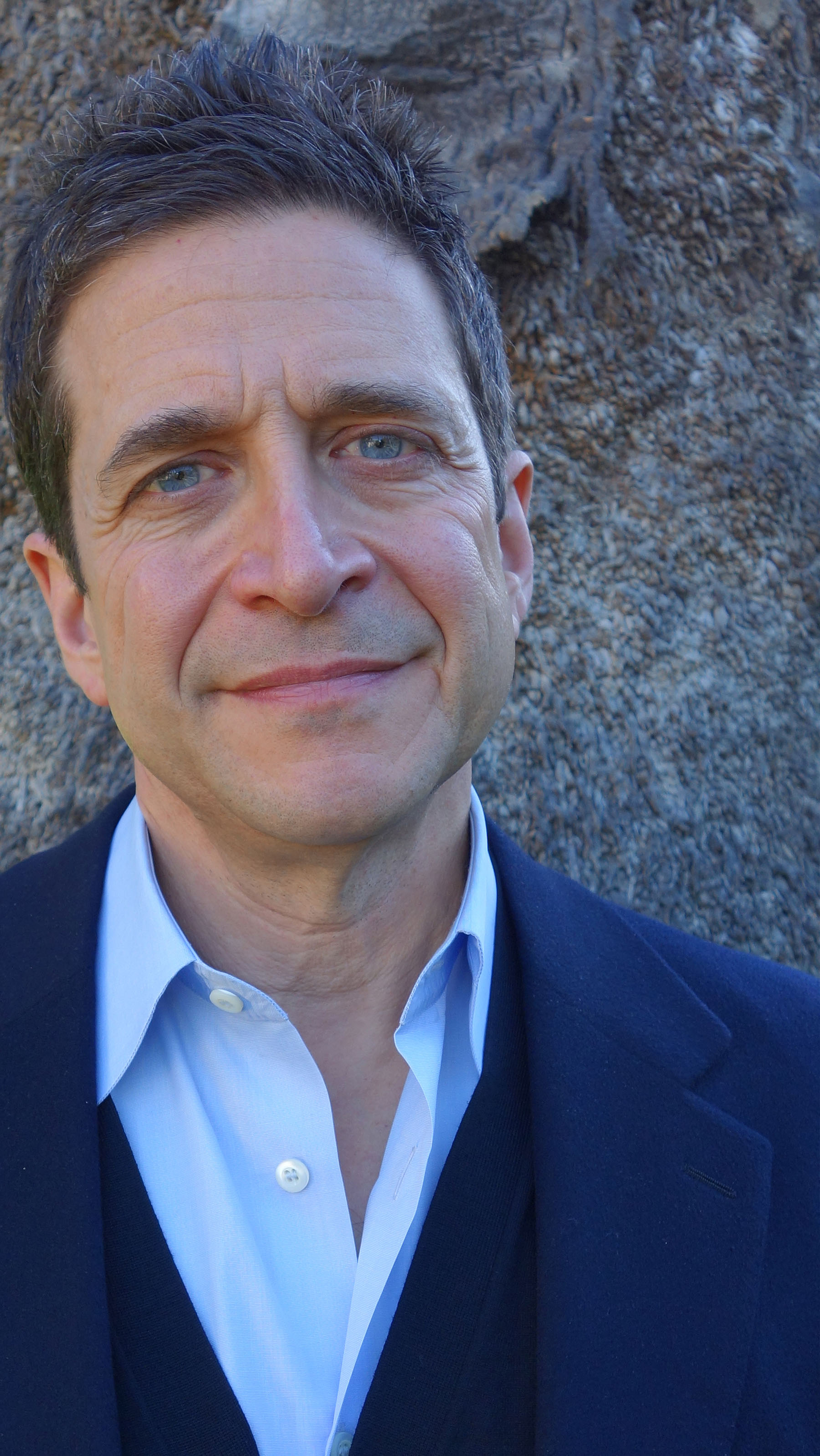
Paul Attanasio, Best Adapted Screenplay winner

=== BAFTA Fellowship ===
- **Billy Wilder**

=== Outstanding British Contribution to Cinema ===
- **Ridley Scott** and **Tony Scott**

=== Awards ===
Winners are listed first and highlighted in boldface.

**Best Film**: **Four Weddings and a Funeral – Duncan Kenworthy and Mike Newell**; Forrest Gump – Wendy Finerman, Steve Tisch, Steve Starkey and Robert Zemeckis; Pulp Fiction – Lawrence Bender and Quentin Tarantino; Quiz Show – Michael Jacobs, Julian Krainin, Michael Nozik and Robert Redford	**Best Direction**: **Mike Newell – Four Weddings and a Funeral**; Krzysztof Kieślowski – Three Colours: Red; Quentin Tarantino – Pulp Fiction; Robert Zemeckis – Forrest Gump
**Best Actor in a Leading Role**: **Hugh Grant – Four Weddings and a Funeral as Charles**; Tom Hanks – Forrest Gump as Forrest Gump; Terence Stamp – The Adventures of Priscilla, Queen of the Desert as Bernadette Bassenger; John Travolta – Pulp Fiction as Vincent Vega	**Best Actress in a Leading Role**: **Susan Sarandon – The Client as Regina Love**; Linda Fiorentino – The Last Seduction as Bridget Gregory; Irène Jacob – Three Colours: Red as Valentine Dussaut; Uma Thurman – Pulp Fiction as Mia Wallace
**Best Actor in a Supporting Role**: **Samuel L. Jackson – Pulp Fiction as Jules Winnfield**; Simon Callow – Four Weddings and a Funeral as Gareth; John Hannah – Four Weddings and a Funeral as Matthew; Paul Scofield – Quiz Show as Mark Van Doren	**Best Actress in a Supporting Role**: **Kristin Scott Thomas – Four Weddings and a Funeral as Fiona**; Charlotte Coleman – Four Weddings and a Funeral as Scarlett; Sally Field – Forrest Gump as Mrs. Gump; Anjelica Huston – Manhattan Murder Mystery as Marcia Fox
**Best Original Screenplay**: **Pulp Fiction – Quentin Tarantino and Roger Avary**; The Adventures of Priscilla, Queen of the Desert – Stephan Elliott; Four Weddings and a Funeral – Richard Curtis; Philadelphia – Ron Nyswaner; Three Colours: Red – Krzysztof Kieślowski and Krzysztof Piesiewicz	**Best Adapted Screenplay**: **Quiz Show – Paul Attanasio**; The Browning Version – Ronald Harwood; Forrest Gump – Eric Roth; The Joy Luck Club – Amy Tan and Ronald Bass
**Best Cinematography**: **Interview with the Vampire – Philippe Rousselot**; The Adventures of Priscilla, Queen of the Desert – Brian J. Breheny; Forrest Gump – Don Burgess; Pulp Fiction – Andrzej Sekuła	**Best Costume Design**: **The Adventures of Priscilla, Queen of the Desert – Lizzy Gardiner and Tim Chappel**; Four Weddings and a Funeral – Lindy Hemming; Interview with the Vampire – Sandy Powell; Little Women – Colleen Atwood
**Best Editing**: **Speed – John Wright**; Forrest Gump – Arthur Schmidt; Four Weddings and a Funeral – Jon Gregory; Pulp Fiction – Sally Menke	**Best Makeup and Hair**: **The Adventures of Priscilla, Queen of the Desert – Cassie Hanlon, Angela Conte and Strykermeyer**; Interview with the Vampire – Stan Winston, Michèle Burke and Jan Archibald; The Mask – Greg Cannom and Sheryl Leigh Ptak; Mrs. Doubtfire – Greg Cannom, Ve Neill and Yolanda Toussieng
**Best Original Music**: **Backbeat – Don Was**; The Adventures of Priscilla, Queen of the Desert – Guy Gross; Four Weddings and a Funeral – Richard Rodney Bennett; The Lion King – Hans Zimmer	**Best Production Design**: **Interview with the Vampire – Dante Ferretti**; The Adventures of Priscilla, Queen of the Desert – Owen Paterson and Colin Gibson; Mary Shelley's Frankenstein – Tim Harvey; The Mask – Craig Stearns
**Best Sound**: **Speed – Stephen Hunter Flick, Gregg Landaker, Steve Maslow, Bob Beemer and David MacMillan**; Backbeat – Glenn Freemantle, Chris Munro and Robin O'Donoghue; The Lion King – Terry Porter, Mel Metcalfe, David J. Hudson and Doc Kane; Pulp Fiction – Stephen Hunter Flick, Ken King, Rick Ash and Dean A. Zupancic	**Best Special Visual Effects**: **Forrest Gump – Ken Ralston, George Murphy, Stephen Rosenbaum, Allen Hall and Doug Chiang**; The Mask – Scott Squires, Steve Williams, Tom Bertino and Jon Farhat; Speed – Boyd Shermis, John Frazier, Ron Brinkmann and Richard E. Hollander; True Lies – John Bruno, Thomas L. Fisher, Jacques Stroweis, Patrick McClung and Jamie Dixon
**Outstanding British Film**: **Shallow Grave – Andrew Macdonald and Danny Boyle**; Backbeat – Finola Dwyer, Stephen Woolley and Iain Softley; Bhaji on the Beach – Nadine Marsh-Edwards and Gurinder Chadha; Priest – George S. J. Faber, Josephine Ward and Antonia Bird	**Best Film Not in the English Language**: **To Live – Chiu Fu-sheng and Zhang Yimou**; Belle Époque – Fernando Trueba; Eat Drink Man Woman – Hsu Li-kong and Ang Lee; Three Colours: Red – Marin Karmitz and Krzysztof Kieślowski
**Best Short Animation**: **The Big Story – Tim Watts and David Stoten**; The Monk and the Fish – Patrick Eveno, Jacques-Remy Girard and Michaël Dudok de Wit; Pib and Pog – Carla Shelley and Peter Peake; Stressed – Karen Kelly	**Best Short Film**: **Zinky Boys Go Underground – Tatiana Kennedy and Paul Tickell**; Lost Mojave – Vladimir Perlovich and Jonathan Cardish; Marooned – Andrea Calderwood and Jonas Grimås; That Sunday – Damiano Vukotic and Dan Zeff

== Statistics ==
Films that received multiple nominations
Nominations	Film
11	Four Weddings and a Funeral
9	Pulp Fiction
8	Forrest Gump
7	The Adventures of Priscilla, Queen of the Desert
4	Interview with the Vampire
4	Three Colours: Red
3	Backbeat
3	The Mask
3	Quiz Show
3	Speed
2	The Lion King

Films that received multiple awards
Awards	Film
4	Four Weddings and a Funeral
2	The Adventures of Priscilla, Queen of the Desert
2	Interview with the Vampire
2	Pulp Fiction
2	Speed

== See also ==
- 1st Screen Actors Guild Awards
- 8th European Film Awards – Award ceremony for European films held in 1995
- 10th Independent Spirit Awards – US film awards ceremony in 1995
- 20th César Awards – Annual film award
- 21st Saturn Awards – 1994 film and television awards
- 47th Directors Guild of America Awards
- 47th Writers Guild of America Awards
- 67th Academy Awards
- 6th Golden Laurel Awards
- 9th Goya Awards
- 15th Golden Raspberry Awards – Award for worst cinematic under-achievements in 1994
- 52nd Golden Globe Awards – Film award ceremony in 1995
