= MTV Movie Award for Best Action Sequence =

Film award category

The following is a list of the MTV Movie Award winners and nominees for Best Action Sequence. This award was last given out in 2005.

Year	Action scene Movie	Nominees
1992	L.A. freeway scene —Terminator 2: Judgment Day (James Cameron)	Burning building/Escape through old tunnel - Backdraft (Ron Howard); Roof scene - The Hard Way (John Badham); Helicopter blades sequence - The Last Boy Scout (Tony Scott); Second jump from the plane - Point Break (Kathryn Bigelow)
1993	Mel Gibson's motorcycle crash —Lethal Weapon 3 (Richard Donner)	Aliens chase through tunnel - Alien 3 (David Fincher); Plane crash - Alive (Frank Marshall); Oklahoma land race - Far and Away (Ron Howard); Helicopter explosion - Under Siege (Andrew Davis)
1994	Train wreck —The Fugitive (Andrew Davis)	Opening catwalk sequence - Cliffhanger (Renny Harlin); Motorcycle scene - Hard Target (John Woo); T-Rex/Jeep scene - Jurassic Park (Steven Spielberg); Lena Olin handcuffed in backseat of a car - Romeo is Bleeding (Peter Medak)
1995	Bus escape/Airplane explosion —Speed (Jan de Bont)	Escape from exploding ship - Blown Away (Stephen Hopkins); Ambush of CIA convoy - Clear and Present Danger (Phillip Noyce); Bridge explosion/Limo rescue - True Lies (James Cameron)
1996	Battle scene —Braveheart (Mel Gibson)	Airplane hangar shootout - Bad Boys (Michael Bay); Underground shootout/explosion - Broken Arrow (John Woo); Drive through NYC/Subway explosion and derailment - Die Hard with a Vengeance (John McTiernan)
1997	Truck drives through farm equipment —Twister (Jan de Bont)	Arnold Schwarzenegger freefalls - Eraser (Chuck Russell); Aliens blowup cities - Independence Day (Roland Emmerich); Train/Helicopter chase - Mission: Impossible (Brian De Palma); Ferrari chase through San Francisco - The Rock (Michael Bay)
1998	Speedboat chase —Face/Off (John Woo)	T-Rex attacks San Diego - The Lost World: Jurassic Park (Steven Spielberg); Bug attacks fortress - Starship Troopers (Paul Verhoeven); Ship sinks - Titanic (James Cameron); Motorcycle/helicopter chase - Tomorrow Never Dies (Roger Spottiswoode)
1999	Asteroid destroys New York City —Armageddon (Michael Bay)	Gibson/Glover car chase on freeway and through building - Lethal Weapon 4 (Richard Donner); Car chase in France with Robert De Niro pursuing Natascha McElhone - Ronin (John Frankenheimer); Tom Hanks and company land on Normandy Beach - Saving Private Ryan (Steven Spielberg)
2000	The Pod Race —Star Wars: Episode I – The Phantom Menace (George Lucas)	End sequence -The Blair Witch Project (Daniel Myrick and Eduardo Sanchez); Rooftop/Helicopter scene - The Matrix (The Wachowskis) (Note: Credited as The Wachowski Brothers.); Sand monster scene - The Mummy (Stephen Sommers)
2001	Motorcycle chase —Mission: Impossible 2 (John Woo)	Plane crash - Cast Away (Robert Zemeckis); Roman army vs. Germanic horde - Gladiator (Ridley Scott); Car chase through construction site - Gone in 60 Seconds (Dominic Sena)
2002	Japanese attack scene —Pearl Harbor (Michael Bay)	First helicopter crash - Black Hawk Down (Ridley Scott); Final race - The Fast and the Furious (Rob Cohen); Cave tomb battle - The Lord of the Rings: The Fellowship of the Ring (Peter Jackson)
2003	Battle for Helm's Deep —The Lord of the Rings: The Two Towers (Peter Jackson)	Collision on Highway 23 - Final Destination 2 (David R. Ellis); The Escape - Minority Report (Steven Spielberg); Arena Conflict - Star Wars: Episode II – Attack of the Clones (George Lucas)
2004	Battle at Gondor —The Lord of the Rings: The Return of the King (Peter Jackson)	Intercoastal Freeway Pursuit - Bad Boys II (Michael Bay); Escape from Mongolia - Charlie's Angels: Full Throttle (McG); Champion Crane Chase - Terminator 3: Rise of the Machines (Jonathan Mostow)
2005	Destruction of Los Angeles —The Day After Tomorrow (Roland Emmerich)	Beverly Hills plane crash - The Aviator (Martin Scorsese); Moscow car chase - The Bourne Supremacy (Paul Greengrass); Subway battle - Spider-Man 2 (Sam Raimi); Desert Terrorist Assault - Team America: World Police (Trey Parker)
