= True Lies =

1994 action comedy film by James Cameron

- Theatrical release poster
- Directed by: James Cameron
- Screenplay by: James Cameron
- Based on: La Totale! (1991 film) by Claude Zidi; Simon Michaël; Didier Kaminka Émilie (1981 screenplay) by Lucien Lambert
- Produced by: James Cameron; Stephanie Austin
- Starring: Arnold Schwarzenegger; Jamie Lee Curtis; Tom Arnold; Bill Paxton; Art Malik; Tia Carrere
- Cinematography: Russell Carpenter
- Edited by: Conrad Buff IV; Mark Goldblatt; Richard A. Harris
- Music by: Brad Fiedel
- Production company: Lightstorm Entertainment
- Distributed by: 20th Century Fox (United States, Canada, France and Italy); Universal Pictures (through United International Pictures, international)
- Release dates: July 12, 1994 (Regency Village Theatre); July 15, 1994 (United States)
- Running time: 141 minutes
- Country: United States
- Language: English
- Budget: $100–120 million
- Box office: $378.9 million

True Lies is a 1994 American action comedy film written and directed by James Cameron. It stars Arnold Schwarzenegger as Harry Tasker, a U.S. government agent, who struggles to balance his double life as a spy with his familial duties, and Jamie Lee Curtis as his unknowing wife. Tom Arnold, Bill Paxton, Art Malik, Tia Carrere, Eliza Dushku, and Charlton Heston star in supporting roles. The screenplay is based on the 1991 French comedy film La Totale!.

The film was the first Lightstorm Entertainment project to be distributed under Cameron's multimillion-dollar production deal with 20th Century Fox, as well as the first major production for the visual effects company Digital Domain, which was co-founded by Cameron. It was also the first film to cost $100 million.

True Lies received mostly positive reviews from critics, and ultimately grossed $378 million worldwide at the box office, becoming the third-highest-grossing film of 1994. For her performance, Curtis won the Golden Globe Award for Best Actress – Motion Picture Musical or Comedy and the Saturn Award for Best Actress, while Cameron won the Saturn Award for Best Director. It was also nominated at the Academy Awards and BAFTAs in the Best Visual Effects category, and also for seven Saturn Awards. A streaming television series adaptation premiered in 2023.

A 2004 ruling by the Court of Appeal of Paris found that True Lies and La Totale! were plagiarized from an unproduced 1981 screenplay, Émilie, by Lucien Lambert.

== Plot ==
Harry Tasker, to the knowledge of his wife Helen and his daughter Dana, is a mild-mannered computer hardware salesman often away on business trips. In reality he works for Omega Sector, a top-secret U.S. counterterrorism agency. Harry, aided by his teammates Albert "Gib" Gibson and Faisil, infiltrates a party in Switzerland hosted by billionaire Jamal Khaled. At the party, Harry approaches Khaled's art dealer Juno Skinner, who is also a paid agent of "Crimson Jihad", a terrorist organization led by Salim Abu Aziz.

Posing as a potential art entrepreneur, Harry visits Juno, leading the terrorists to attempt to kill him. Harry fights them off but loses Aziz in a pursuit. As a result, Harry misses the birthday party that Helen and Dana planned for him. The next day, Harry goes to Helen's office to reconcile with her, but instead overhears her secretly arranging to meet someone called Simon.

Suspecting Helen is having an affair, Harry uses Omega Sector resources to learn that Simon is a used car salesman who pretends to be a spy to seduce women. In disguise, Harry and other Omega agents arrest Helen and Simon. After terrifying Simon into keeping away from Helen, Harry and Gib interrogate her while hiding their identities. They understand she is suffering a midlife crisis and is desperately seeking adventure. They arrange for Helen to participate in a staged spy mission, where she is to seduce a mysterious figure (who is actually Harry) and plant a bug in his hotel room. As the fake mission proceeds, Aziz's men burst in and capture Helen and Harry.

The couple is taken to an island in the Florida Keys, where Harry's double life is exposed to Helen, revealing that he had been deceiving her since before they were married. Harry discerns Juno had managed to smuggle four MIRV nuclear warheads by concealing them in phony antique statues. Aziz sends a message threatening to detonate warheads in major cities unless the U.S. government withdraws its forces from the Persian Gulf. He starts a timer to detonate one warhead on an uninhabited island as a demonstration.

Harry breaks out of his restraints and kills his would-be torturers. The couple discovers that one warhead is set to explode in 90 minutes while the others are loaded onto vehicles to be taken into the mainland via the Overseas Highway, bypassing U.S. Customs. In the ensuing melee, Harry and Helen kill many of the terrorists, but their main convoy drives off with two warheads, while Aziz carries one on a helicopter. Helen is caught by Juno and taken in a limousine following the convoy.

Gib and other Omega agents pick up Harry. Two Marine Harrier jump jets destroy part of the original Seven Mile Bridge, intercepting the convoy. Hanging from a helicopter, Harry rescues Helen from the limousine just before it plummets off the bridge—killing Juno—as the couple reconciles and Helen falls back in love with Harry for the man he truly is. The warhead left on the island detonates without killing anyone.

Harry is told by Gib that Aziz and his men are holding Dana hostage in a Miami skyscraper and are threatening to detonate their last warhead. Harry commandeers one of the jets to rescue her. Faisil gets into the building by posing as a news cameraman. Dana steals the missile control key and flees to the roof, while Faisil kills several of Aziz's men. Aziz pursues Dana onto a tower crane, and then Harry arrives. Harry rescues Dana, and after a struggle with Aziz, he has him ensnared on the end of one of the plane's missiles, which Harry fires at a terrorist helicopter, killing Aziz and the remnants of Crimson Jihad. Harry, Helen and Dana are safely reunited.

A year later, Harry and Helen are working together as Omega agents. While on a mission at a formal party, they encounter Simon, working as a waiter and pretending to be a spy. Simon flees in terror after they reveal who they really are and threaten to kill him to keep their cover intact. Harry and Helen dance the tango, while Gib pleads for them to take their work seriously.

== Cast ==
- Arnold Schwarzenegger as Harry Tasker
- Jamie Lee Curtis as Helen Tasker
- Tia Carrere as Juno Skinner
- Tom Arnold as Albert "Gib" Gibson
- Bill Paxton as Simon
- Art Malik as Salim Abu Aziz
- Eliza Dushku as Dana Tasker
- Grant Heslov as Faisil
- Charlton Heston as Spencer Trilby
- Marshall Manesh as Jamal Khaled
- Ofer Samra as Yusif
- John Bruno as High-Rise Custodian

== Production ==
Arnold Schwarzenegger stated that while filming a scene with a horse, a camera boom hit the horse and "it went crazy, spinning and rearing" near a drop of 90 feet (27 m). Schwarzenegger quickly slid off the horse and a stuntman caught him; he concluded, "[this is] why I will always love stunt people". Art Malik said he was drawn to the script's "pantomime quality" and the chance to work with director James Cameron. Costing $100–120 million to produce, True Lies was the first film with a production budget of over $100 million. It was filmed over a seven-month schedule.

Of the many locations that were used in the film, the Rosecliff Mansion was used for the ballroom tango scenes in the beginning of the film and the exterior of the Swiss chalet that Harry Tasker infiltrates is Ochre Court. The ballroom dancing scene that closes the film, as well as the scenes in the lobby of the fictional Hotel Marquis in Washington, take place in the Crystal Ballroom of the Millennium Biltmore Hotel in downtown Los Angeles. The outdoor structures used by Aziz's smuggling ring as a base of operations were a series of custom made Alaska Structures fabric buildings, leased to the production crew during filming.

It was during the production of True Lies in 1993 when Cameron would also first meet his future Titanic and Avatar film series co-producer Jon Landau, who Cameron stated in July 2024 was "the studio 'suit' assigned to oversee True Lies." In the time following the production of True Lies, Landau would leave Fox to join Cameron's production company Lightstorm.

=== Joel Kramer sexual misconduct allegation ===
In 2018, Eliza Dushku alleged that while filming True Lies at the age of twelve, she was sexually molested by the film's stunt coordinator, Joel Kramer. According to Dushku, soon after that, an adult friend of hers confronted Kramer on set, and that same day, Dushku was injured during a stunt and several of her ribs were broken, while Kramer was responsible for her safety. Dushku's co-stars Arnold Schwarzenegger, Jamie Lee Curtis, Tom Arnold, and director James Cameron all voiced support and admiration for Dushku's bravery. Kramer has denied the accusation of sexual misconduct.

== Music ==
True Lies was the first film to use the 1994 20th Century Fox logo and fanfare adapted and composed by Alfred Newman; conducted by Bruce Broughton.

True Lies

Film score by Brad Fiedel and various artists
- Released: July 19, 1994
- Length: 70:35
- Label: Lightstorm/Epic Soundtrax

All music is composed by Brad Fiedel, except where noted.

Track list
No.	Title	Writer(s)	Performer(s)	Length
1.	"Sunshine of Your Love"	Jack Bruce, Eric Clapton	Living Colour	5:17
2.	"Darkness, Darkness"	Jesse Colin Young	Screaming Trees	4:08
3.	"Alone in the Dark"	John Hiatt	John Hiatt	4:46
4.	"Entity"	Christian Leibfried, Geoff Haba, Bryan Tulao, David Robert Gould	Mother Tongue	4:21
5.	"Sunshine of Your Love (The Adrian Sherwood & Skip McDonald Remix)"	Bruce, Clapton	Living Colour	5:49
6.	"Main Title/Harry Makes His Entrance"			2:40
7.	"Escape from the Chateau"			2:41
8.	"Harry's Sweet Home"			1:06
9.	"Harry Rides Again"			7:05
10.	"Spying on Helen"			4:16
11.	"Juno's Place"			1:29
12.	"Caught in the Act"			1:29
13.	"Shadow Lover"			1:20
14.	"Island Suite"			6:55
15.	"Causeway/Helicopter Rescue"			7:56
16.	"Nuclear Kiss"			0:51
17.	"Harry Saves the Day"			8:26
Total length:				70:35

Songs appearing in the film not included on the soundtrack album:

- "I Never Thought I'd See the Day" – Sade
- "More Than a Woman" – Bee Gees
- "The Blue Danube" – The Philadelphia Orchestra
- "Por una Cabeza" – Argentinean tango, performed by The Tango Project

== Reception ==
=== Box office ===
True Lies was a box-office success. Opening in 2,368 theaters in the United States and Canada, it ranked number one at the US box office in its opening weekend, grossing $25,869,770 and beating Forrest Gump. Once Forrest Gump returned to the top of the box office the following week, True Lies dropped into second place, grossing $20.7 million. It set a record opening weekend in South Korea with a gross of $995,023. It also had a record opening weekend in Japan for distributor Nippon Herald with a gross of $3 million and was number one at the Japanese box office for twelve straight weeks. True Lies was the second major American film to be released in China since The Fugitive and generated a total of CN¥103 million, becoming the country's highest-grossing Hollywood film. The film also became the highest-grossing film of all time in the Philippines. True Lies went on to gross $146,282,411 in the United States and Canada and $232,600,000 in the rest of world, totaling $378,882,411 worldwide, making it the third-highest-grossing film of 1994, behind The Lion King and Forrest Gump.

=== Critical reception ===
On the review aggregator website Rotten Tomatoes, the film holds an approval rating of 77% based on 135 reviews. The website's critical consensus reads, "If it doesn't reach the heights of director James Cameron's and star Arnold Schwarzenegger's previous collaborations, True Lies still packs enough action and humor into its sometimes absurd plot to entertain". On Metacritic, the film has a weighted average score of 63 out of 100 based on reviews from 17 critics, indicating "generally favorable reviews". Audiences polled by CinemaScore gave the film an average grade of "A" on an A+ to F scale.

Roger Ebert of the Chicago Sun-Times gave the film three stars out of four, writing, "It's stuff like that we go to Arnold Schwarzenegger movies for, and True Lies has a lot of it: laugh-out-loud moments when the violence is so cartoonish we don't take it seriously, and yet are amazed at its inventiveness and audacity." He wrote that he found the plot "perfunctory", but praised the film's stunts and special effects. In a two out of five review, Bob Fenster of The Arizona Republic stated that "True Lies isn't as bad as Last Action Hero, but it's not half as hot as Speed."

The film received criticism for its portrayal of Middle Easterners and its treatment of female characters. John Simon of the National Review criticized the plot line of the hero character (Schwarzenegger) using his agency's resources to stalk and frighten his wife as cruel and misogynistic. In a negative review, Kenneth Turan of the Los Angeles Times wrote:

Taken individually, the cruder and childish things about this film, its determination to use caricatured unshaven Arabs as terrorists, the pleasure it takes in continually mortifying a weasely used-car salesman (Bill Paxton) in the most personal ways, might be overlooked, but added together they leave a sour taste.

Some Arabs and Muslims perceived the film as conveying strong anti-Arab or anti-Muslim prejudice, with some Arab-American advocacy groups calling for its banning in Arab countries.

In a 2022 retrospective review, Polish writer Jacek Szafranowicz called the film "a masterpiece of cinematic fun", noting that the collaboration between the director and its main star "deserves a golden medal". Commenting on the state of blockbuster films, Scott Tobias of The Guardian and The A.V. Club wrote, "True Lies is the strange case of a film that's alternately retrograde, forward-looking, and thoroughly of its time. For better or worse, it's a marker of how the Hollywood action blockbuster had advanced in 1994, as well as a commentary (intended or not) on the troubled state of American masculinity, marital relationships, and lingering racial attitudes."

=== Accolades ===
==== Year-end lists ====
- 4th – David Stupich, The Milwaukee Journal
- Top 3 Runner-ups (not ranked) – Sandi Davis, The Oklahoman
- Top 10 (listed alphabetically, not ranked) – Mike Clark, USA Today
- Top 10 (listed alphabetically, not ranked) – Jimmy Fowler, Dallas Observer
- Honorable mention – Michael MacCambridge, Austin American-Statesman
- Honorable mention – Dan Craft, The Pantagraph
- 5th worst – Glenn Lovell, San Jose Mercury News
- Top 10 worst (listed alphabetically, not ranked) – Mike Mayo, The Roanoke Times
- Top 10 worst (listed alphabetically, not ranked) – William Arnold, Seattle Post-Intelligencer

==== Awards and nominations ====
Award	Category	Recipient	Result	Ref.
Academy Awards	Best Visual Effects	John Bruno, Thomas L. Fisher, Jacques Stroweis and Patrick McClung	Nominated	
American Cinema Editors Awards	Best Edited Feature Film	Conrad Buff IV, Mark Goldblatt and Richard A. Harris	Nominated	
American Comedy Awards	Funniest Lead Actress in a Motion Picture	Jamie Lee Curtis	Won	
British Academy Film Awards	Best Special Visual Effects	John Bruno, Thomas L. Fisher, Jacques Stroweis, Pat McClung and Jamie Dixon	Nominated	
Cinema Audio Society Awards	Outstanding Achievement in Sound Mixing for Feature Films	Lee Orloff, Michael Minkler and Bob Beemer	Nominated	
Golden Globe Awards	Best Actress in a Motion Picture – Comedy or Musical	Jamie Lee Curtis	Won	
Japan Academy Film Prize	Outstanding Foreign Language Film	True Lies	Nominated	
MTV Movie Awards	Best Female Performance	Jamie Lee Curtis	Nominated	
MTV Movie Awards	Best Comedic Performance	Tom Arnold	Nominated	
MTV Movie Awards	Best Kiss	Arnold Schwarzenegger and Jamie Lee Curtis	Nominated	
MTV Movie Awards	Best Dance Sequence	Arnold Schwarzenegger and Tia Carrere	Nominated	
MTV Movie Awards	Best Action Sequence	Bridge Explosion/Limo Rescue	Nominated	
Saturn Awards	Best Action/Adventure/Thriller Film	True Lies	Nominated	
Saturn Awards	Best Direction	James Cameron	Won	
Saturn Awards	Best Actor	Arnold Schwarzenegger	Nominated	
Saturn Awards	Best Actress	Jamie Lee Curtis	Won (Note: Tied with Sandra Bullock for Speed.)	
Saturn Awards	Best Supporting Actor	Bill Paxton	Nominated	
Saturn Awards	Best Supporting Actress	Tia Carrere	Nominated	
Saturn Awards	Best Special Effects	John Bruno (Digital Domain)	Won	
Screen Actors Guild Awards	Outstanding Performance by a Female Actor in a Supporting Role	Jamie Lee Curtis	Nominated	

=== Censorship ===
On October 1, 1994, True Lies was banned from Indonesian movie theaters due to the film spawning controversy that focused on Muslim leaders insulting Islam and portraying themselves as religious extremists. According to the Council of Muslim Scholars, it led people to hate Arab terrorists defending the interests of some Islamic nations, but justified American terrorism. Earlier that year, officials had already banned Schindler's List from the country because it contained too much violence and nudity.

== Plagiarism lawsuit ==
True Lies and its source material La Totale! were the subject of a 2000 plagiarism lawsuit launched by French screenwriter Lucien Lambert. Lambert sued Cameron and La Totale! writer-director Claude Zidi, claiming the latter had knowingly plagiarized from his unproduced 1981 screenplay called Émilie, about a con artist who poses as a spy in order to seduce a woman.

In 2001, the court ruled against Lambert, which he appealed. In June 2004, the Court of Appeal of Paris ruled in favor of Lambert, based on new evidence. Claude Zidi was ordered to pay Lambert US$15 million (his total profit percentage for the box office receipts of True Lies). Cameron was not held liable for damages, as the Court ruled he had purchased the film rights to La Totale! in good faith.

== Home media ==
True Lies was released on VHS on January 10, 1995, and on LaserDisc a month later on February 8. It was the second LaserDisc release to feature a Dolby Digital AC-3 track, after Clear and Present Danger. On August 20, 1996, the film was released on a THX certified Widescreen Series VHS release, along with Speed, The Abyss and The Last of the Mohicans. It was then released on a non-anamorphic widescreen DVD on May 25, 1999. A two-disc "Five-Star Collection" edition DVD with anamorphic widescreen was planned for release in 2002, but was scrapped after the September 11 attacks. A high-definition version was released on D-Theater in 2003. In 2018, James Cameron stated that a new transfer for Blu-ray had been completed, but he hasn't found time to review it.

Walt Disney Studios Home Entertainment released the film for purchase digitally on December 12, 2023, followed by a release on Blu-ray and Ultra HD Blu-ray on March 12, 2024. This release, along with the 4K releases of Cameron's Aliens and The Abyss, have received criticism for the quality of their AI upscaling.

== Legacy ==
=== Video game ===
Shortly after the film's release, video game based on the film of the same name were released for the Super Nintendo Entertainment System, Sega Genesis, Game Gear and Game Boy platforms.

=== Cancelled sequel ===
In April 1997, Arnold Schwarzenegger and Tom Arnold met with Cameron and discussed the possibility of an eventual True Lies sequel, which would also bring back Curtis in her role. At the time, Cameron was busy working on Titanic. Following the release of Titanic in late 1997, Cameron was planning to begin work on a True Lies sequel early the following year. Schwarzenegger and Arnold were expected to reprise their roles. Cameron conducted a search for a writer to work on True Lies 2. In August 1999, Cameron and 20th Century Fox were negotiating to have Jeff Eastin write the script under Cameron's supervision. At the time, the film was being planned for a mid-2001 release, with Cameron expected to direct it. By the end of 1999, there was the possibility that filming would begin in the third quarter of 2000. However, development of the script was ongoing as of June 2000. Cameron planned to produce True Lies 2 with Fox, but was undecided at that time on whether he would also direct it, as he wanted to wait until the script was complete. Eastin worked with Cameron on the project for approximately a year and a half, and Schwarzenegger and Arnold liked Eastin's script.

By March 2001, the script had been completed, and Curtis was confirmed to reprise her role alongside Schwarzenegger and Arnold. Following the September 11 attacks, Schwarzenegger said in January 2002, "We'll shoot it next year. We have a good script. There does need to be some changes because it deals with some terrorist act of some sort. But it's pretty much done." Later in 2002, Cameron said the film would not be made following the September 11 attacks: "Terrorism is no longer something to take as lightly as we did in the first one. I just can't see it happening given the current world climate."

In June 2003, Schwarzenegger said that after the attacks, "Cameron was worried because there's an airplane scene – a terrific airplane scene – that didn't have anything to do with the terrorism that we had in 9/11, but it was a great fight scene inside the plane while the plane goes down and this kind of thing. It was a very important moment in the movie, and he felt like he can't do that and therefore has to rewrite it ... These things take a long time." The following month, Curtis said the film would never be made due to the September 11 attacks: "Terrorists aren't funny anymore. They never were, but, it was distant enough from our psyche that we could make it funny. It'll never be funny again. I just think that that is over, that kind of humor is over." Eastin cited Schwarzenegger's 2003 election as California governor as another reason that True Lies 2 did not get made. However, Arnold remained optimistic that the film would be made. (Note: Attributed to multiple references:)

In 2005, Schwarzenegger said he had met with Cameron, Curtis, Paxton, and Dushku to discuss True Lies 2. Schwarzenegger said that filming would begin once his role as California governor was concluded. Cameron said in 2009 that there were no plans to make the film, and Curtis, in 2019, reiterated her previous comments: "I don't think we could ever do another True Lies after 9/11." Art Malik concurred, saying during the time of True Lies' filming, "there was an element of fanaticism brewing and anti-West feeling going on. But I don't think any of us took any of it as seriously as we had to after 9/11. I think one of the reasons for that is probably the reason True Lies 2 was never made.”

In the 2005 film The Kid & I, Tom Arnold plays a fictional character based on himself. In that film, the character had starred in True Lies and is pursued by a fan and teams up with Henry Winkler and Linda Hamilton to make a sequel; Schwarzenegger and Curtis cameo as themselves.

=== Television series ===
On February 10, 2021, CBS announced a pilot order for the True Lies series adaptation. Matt Nix wrote the pilot and produce with Josh Levy via Flying Glass of Milk Productions. James Cameron, director of the film, executive produced with Rae Sanchini through Lightstorm Entertainment. Mary Viola of Wonderland Sound and Vision also executive produced, with Corey Marsh of Wonderland co-executive producing. McG was set to direct the pilot and executive produce via Wonderland. In March 2021, CBS moved the pilot "off cycle" to give the series producers more time to film the pilot later in the year.

By May 2022, Anthony Hemingway replaced McG as the director of the pilot and subsequent episodes, via Anthony Hemingway Productions, to air by the 2022–23 broadcast season at CBS. Steve Howey and Ginger Gonzaga were cast in the lead roles, while Erica Hernandez, Omar Miller, Mike O'Gorman, Annabella Didion, and Lucas Jaye round out the supporting roles. On May 13, 2022, CBS officially picked up the series. The series was scheduled to premiere on February 23, 2023, however, it was delayed to March 1, 2023, and was ultimately canceled in May 2023.

== See also ==
- List of American films of 1994
- Robert Hendy-Freegard
