= List of 1994 box office number-one films in the United States =

This is a list of films which have placed number one at the weekend box office in the United States during 1994.

== Number-one films ==
†	This implies the highest-grossing movie of the year.

#	Weekend end date	Film	Box office	Notes	Ref
1	January 9, 1994	Mrs. Doubtfire	$11,536,024		
2	January 16, 1994	Philadelphia	$13,817,010	Philadelphia reached No. 1 in its first weekend of wide release and fourth overall week. It was the highest-grossing wide debut in January	
3	January 23, 1994	Philadelphia	$8,830,605	Philadelphia remained number 1 with a margin of just $32,487 over Mrs. Doubtfire.	
4	January 30, 1994	Mrs. Doubtfire	$7,742,001	Mrs. Doubtfire reclaimed number 1 in tenth weekend of release.	
5	February 6, 1994	Ace Ventura: Pet Detective	$12,115,105		
6	February 13, 1994	Ace Ventura: Pet Detective	$9,673,717		
7	February 20, 1994	On Deadly Ground	$12,679,573		
8	February 27, 1994	Ace Ventura: Pet Detective	$6,512,350	Ace Ventura: Pet Detective reclaimed number 1 in its fourth week of release.	
9	March 6, 1994	Ace Ventura: Pet Detective	$5,095,449		
10	March 13, 1994	Guarding Tess	$7,065,213		
11	March 20, 1994	Naked Gun 33 1/3: The Final Insult	$13,216,531		
12	March 27, 1994	D2: The Mighty Ducks	$10,356,748		
13	April 3, 1994	Major League II	$7,040,777		
14	April 10, 1994	D2: The Mighty Ducks	$5,513,111	D2: The Mighty Ducks reclaimed number 1 in its third week of release.	
15	April 17, 1994	Four Weddings and a Funeral	$4,162,489	Four Weddings and a Funeral reached No. 1 in its sixth weekend of limited release.	
16	April 24, 1994	Bad Girls	$5,012,200	Andie MacDowell became the first actress in cinema history to star in two back to back number 1 films as she starred in both Four Weddings and a Funeral and Bad Girls.	
17	May 1, 1994	No Escape	$4,588,736		
18	May 8, 1994	With Honors	$3,741,737	With Honors reached No. 1 in its second week of release.	
19	May 15, 1994	The Crow	$11,774,332	Other industry sources disputed Miramax Films' claimed gross, believing that it was overstated by as much as $1 million.	
20	May 22, 1994	Maverick	$17,248,545		
21	May 29, 1994	The Flintstones	$29,688,730	The Flintstones broke Indiana Jones and the Last Crusade's record ($29.4 mil) for the highest Memorial Day weekend debut and The Fugitive's record ($23.8 mil) for the highest weekend debut for a film based on a television show.	
22	June 5, 1994	The Flintstones	$18,217,305		
23	June 12, 1994	Speed	$14,456,194		
24	June 19, 1994	Wolf	$17,911,366		
25	June 26, 1994	The Lion King †	$40,888,194	The Lion King broke Aladdin's record ($19.3 mil) for the highest weekend debut for an animated film and for a Walt Disney Animation Studios film. It also had the highest weekend debut of 1994.	
26	July 3, 1994	The Lion King †	$34,208,876		
27	July 10, 1994	Forrest Gump	$24,450,602		
28	July 17, 1994	True Lies	$25,869,770		
29	July 24, 1994	Forrest Gump	$21,931,425	Forrest Gump reclaimed number 1 in its third week of release.	
30	July 31, 1994	The Mask	$23,117,068		
31	August 7, 1994	Clear and Present Danger	$20,348,017	Clear and Present Danger broke Patriot Games' record ($18.5 mil) for the highest weekend debut for a spy film.	
32	August 14, 1994	Clear and Present Danger	$15,965,071		
33	August 21, 1994	Forrest Gump	$11,248,160	Forrest Gump reclaimed number 1 in its seventh week of release.	
34	August 28, 1994	Natural Born Killers	$11,166,687		
35	September 4, 1994	Forrest Gump	$12,221,147	Forrest Gump reclaimed number 1 in its ninth week of release.	
36	September 11, 1994	Forrest Gump	$6,760,367	Forrest Gump had its fifth weekend at number one, the most in 1994.	
37	September 18, 1994	Timecop	$12,064,625		
38	September 25, 1994	Timecop	$8,176,615		
39	October 2, 1994	The River Wild	$10,214,450		
40	October 9, 1994	The Specialist	$14,317,765		
41	October 16, 1994	Pulp Fiction	$9,311,882	Other sources disputed Miramax Films' claimed gross for Pulp Fiction with many believing that The Specialist was the number one film for the weekend.	
42	October 23, 1994	Pulp Fiction	$8,389,221		
43	October 30, 1994	Stargate	$16,651,018	Stargate broke Under Siege's record ($15.7 mil) for the highest weekend debut in October.	
44	November 6, 1994	Stargate	$12,368,778		
45	November 13, 1994	Interview with the Vampire	$36,389,705	Interview with the Vampire broke Home Alone 2: Lost in New York's record ($31.1 million) for the highest weekend debut in November, Lethal Weapon 3's record ($33.2 mil) for the highest weekend debut for a R-rated film and Dracula's record ($30.5 million) for highest weekend debut for a vampire film.	
46	November 20, 1994	Star Trek Generations	$23,116,394		
47	November 27, 1994	The Santa Clause	$20,437,607	The Santa Clause reached No. 1 in its third weekend of release.	
48	December 4, 1994	The Santa Clause	$11,390,638		
49	December 11, 1994	Disclosure	$10,068,126		
50	December 18, 1994	Dumb and Dumber	$16,363,442		
51	December 25, 1994^{4-day weekend}	Dumb and Dumber	$15,586,425		
52	January 1, 1995^{4-day weekend}	Dumb and Dumber	$14,929,291		

== Highest-grossing films ==
=== Calendar Gross ===
Highest-grossing films of 1994 by Calendar Gross

Rank	Title	Studio(s)	Actor(s)	Director(s)	Gross
1.	The Lion King	Buena Vista Pictures Distribution	voices of Matthew Broderick, Jonathan Taylor Thomas, James Earl Jones, Jeremy Irons, Moira Kelly, Ernie Sabella, Nathan Lane, Robert Guillaume, Rowan Atkinson, Whoopi Goldberg, Cheech Marin, Jim Cummings and Madge Sinclair	Roger Allers and Rob Minkoff	$298,879,911
2.	Forrest Gump	Paramount Pictures	Tom Hanks, Robin Wright, Gary Sinise, Mykelti Williamson and Sally Field	Robert Zemeckis	$298,096,620
3.	True Lies	20th Century Fox	Arnold Schwarzenegger, Jamie Lee Curtis, Tom Arnold, Bill Paxton, Art Malik and Tia Carrere	James Cameron	$146,282,411
4.	The Santa Clause	Buena Vista Pictures Distribution	Tim Allen, Judge Reinhold, Wendy Crewson, David Krumholtz, Eric Lloyd and Peter Boyle	John Pasquin	$132,242,452
5.	The Flintstones	Universal Pictures	John Goodman, Rick Moranis, Elizabeth Perkins, Rosie O'Donnell, Kyle MacLachlan, Halle Berry and Elizabeth Taylor	Brian Levant	$130,531,208
6.	Clear and Present Danger	Paramount Pictures	Harrison Ford, Willem Dafoe, Anne Archer and James Earl Jones	Phillip Noyce	$122,187,717
7.	Speed	20th Century Fox	Keanu Reeves, Dennis Hopper, Sandra Bullock, Joe Morton and Jeff Daniels	Jan de Bont	$121,248,145
8.	The Mask	New Line Cinema	Jim Carrey, Peter Riegert, Peter Greene, Amy Yasbeck, Richard Jeni and Cameron Diaz	Chuck Russell	$118,644,781
9.	Mrs. Doubtfire	20th Century Fox	Robin Williams, Sally Field, Pierce Brosnan, Harvey Fierstein. Polly Holliday, Lisa Jakub, Matthew Lawrence, Mara Wilson and Robert Prosky	Chris Columbus	$110,108,760
10.	Maverick	Warner Bros.	Mel Gibson, Jodie Foster, James Garner, Graham Greene, James Coburn and Alfred Molina	Richard Donner	$101,631,272

=== In-Year Release ===
Highest-grossing films of 1994 by In-year release
Rank	Title	Distributor	Domestic gross
1.	Forrest Gump	Paramount	$329,694,499
2.	The Lion King	Disney	$312,855,561
3.	True Lies	20th Century Fox	$146,282,411
4.	The Santa Clause	Disney	$144,833,357
5.	The Flintstones	Universal	$130,531,208
6.	Dumb and Dumber	New Line Cinema	$127,175,374
7.	Clear and Present Danger	Paramount	$122,187,717
8.	Speed	20th Century Fox	$121,248,145
9.	The Mask	New Line Cinema	$119,938,730
10.	Pulp Fiction	Miramax	$107,928,762

Highest-grossing films by MPAA rating of 1994
G	The Lion King
PG	The Santa Clause
PG-13	Forrest Gump
R	True Lies

== See also ==
- List of American films — American films by year
- Lists of box office number-one films

== Chronology ==
Preceded by 1993	1994	Succeeded by 1995
