= Speed (1994 film) =

1994 action film by Jan de Bont

- Theatrical release poster
- Directed by: Jan de Bont
- Written by: Graham Yost
- Produced by: Mark Gordon; Allison Lyon Segan
- Starring: Keanu Reeves; Dennis Hopper; Sandra Bullock; Joe Morton; Jeff Daniels
- Cinematography: Andrzej Bartkowiak
- Edited by: John Wright
- Music by: Mark Mancina
- Production company: Mark Gordon Company
- Distributed by: 20th Century Fox
- Release dates: June 7, 1994 (Hollywood); June 10, 1994 (United States)
- Running time: 116 minutes
- Country: United States
- Language: English
- Budget: $30–37 million
- Box office: $350.4 million

Speed is a 1994 American thriller film directed by Jan de Bont in his feature directorial debut, and written by Graham Yost. Keanu Reeves, Dennis Hopper, and Sandra Bullock star in the film, with Joe Morton and Jeff Daniels in supporting roles. The plot centers on a city bus rigged by Howard Payne (Hopper), an ex-cop turned vengeful extortionist, to explode if its speed drops below 50 miles per hour (80 km/h). Reeves plays LAPD officer Jack Traven, who is tasked with preventing the disaster, with Bullock portraying a passenger who becomes unexpectedly involved in the mission.

Inspired largely by Runaway Train (1985) and the Japanese language action thriller film The Bullet Train (1975), Speed premiered on June 7, 1994, and was released on June 10, 1994, by 20th Century Fox. The film received positive reviews from critics and grossed roughly $350 million worldwide against a $30–37 million budget, becoming the fifth-highest-grossing film of 1994. At the 67th Academy Awards, Speed won Best Sound. The film also won Best Sound and Best Editing at the 48th British Academy Film Awards.

A sequel, Speed 2: Cruise Control, was released on June 13, 1997, but achieved the opposite of its predecessor, performing poorly and being widely lambasted by critics for Reeves's absence and the film's change in setting.

== Plot ==
LAPD SWAT bomb disposal officers Jack Traven and Harry Temple are tasked with preventing a bombing on a city elevator containing 13 people. After narrowly rescuing the passengers, the duo find and confront the bomber, during which Harry is shot by Jack after he is taken hostage. The bomber seemingly blows himself up, and Jack and Harry are later commended in a ceremony for their bravery. Some time later a city bus explodes in front of Jack in order to get his attention. It is revealed that the bomber from the elevator incident had survived. He is looking to get his revenge on Jack by planting another bomb on a second city bus full of passengers that will activate upon reaching 50 mph (80 km/h), and will detonate if the speed goes below 50. He warns Jack not to offload passengers or the bus will explode as he demands $3.7 million in ransom.

Racing through traffic, Jack commandeers a car to try to warn the bus driver of the bomb. Realizing the bus has surpassed 50 mph and the bomb is armed, Jack boards the bus, but a street thug, thinking that Jack is after him, pulls out a gun and threatens Jack. The thug's gun goes off as Jack and another passenger subdue him, with the bullet hitting the driver. Another passenger, Annie Porter, takes over driving. With the bomb armed and passengers aware of the threat, Jack contacts Harry for help while trying to keep the bus moving. The bomber agrees to allow the wounded driver to be offloaded as a sign of good faith. However, another passenger, Helen, panics and attempts to get off the bus, but the bomber, watching the bus on television news, detonates a smaller bomb that kills her as she falls under the bus.

Jack and Annie maneuver the bus through several dangerous obstacles, including a gap in the freeway, and direct it to the runways of Los Angeles International Airport to avoid traffic congestion. In an effort to defuse the bomb, Jack goes under the bus on a tethered roller bed, but the cable snaps. He is helped onboard by the passengers. In the process, he punctures the fuel tank and the bus starts leaking gasoline.

Meanwhile, Harry identifies the bomber as former Atlanta Police Department bomb-squad officer Howard Payne, who was forcibly retired after an accident. The bomb's design reflects his long-lasting bitterness over being compensated with nothing but a "cheap gold watch". Harry leads a SWAT team to Payne's house to arrest him. During the raid, Harry inadvertently triggers a booby trap that blows up the house, killing him and the rest of the team. Jack admits defeat until he notices that Payne is monitoring the bus interior with a hidden-surveillance camera. With the help of a television crew, the LAPD tamper with Payne's surveillance footage. This gives Jack enough time to help the passengers escape before the bus crashes into a cargo plane and explodes. While noticing the LAPD has dropped off the ransom and is waiting to apprehend him, Payne sees the tampered video feed and seeks revenge.

The SWAT team are waiting for Payne to appear, but Payne kidnaps Annie while impersonating a police officer. Jack discovers a hole under the trash can, where Payne has taken the ransom and accessed the subway system. Jack finds Annie wearing an explosive vest and Payne holding a pressure release detonator; after a confrontation between Payne and Jack, Payne escapes on a train with Annie handcuffed around a pole. Payne shoots the driver and train controls. He opens the duffel bag containing the money and a dye pack explodes in his face. An enraged Payne fights Jack on the train roof, only to be decapitated by a passing overhead signal when Jack pushes him to the roof of the tunnel. Jack deactivates Annie's vest, but finds that the train cannot be stopped and that he is unable to free Annie from her handcuffs. Jack instead accelerates the train, causing it to derail and crash onto Hollywood Boulevard, screeching to a halt in front of a tour van. Jack and Annie emerge unscathed and share a kiss as onlookers watch in amazement.

== Cast ==
- Keanu Reeves as LAPD Officer Jack Traven
- Dennis Hopper as Howard Payne
- Sandra Bullock as Annie Porter
- Joe Morton as LAPD Lieutenant Herb 'Mac' McMahon
- Jeff Daniels as LAPD Detective Harry Temple
- Alan Ruck as Doug Stephens
- Glenn Plummer as Maurice the Jaguar owner
- Beth Grant as Helen
- Hawthorne James as Sam Silver
- Carlos Carrasco as Ortiz
- David Kriegel as Terry
- Natsuko Ohama as Mrs. Kamino
- Daniel Villarreal as Ray
- Margaret Medina as Officer Robin
- Jordan Lund as Bagwell
- Robert Mailhouse as young executive
- Patrick Fischler as Bob, friend of executive
- Patrick John Hurley as CEO
- Susan Barnes as female executive
- Neisha Folkes-LeMelle as Mrs. McMahon
- Richard Lineback as Sergeant Norwood
- Beau Starr as Commissioner
- Richard Schiff as Hughe, train driver
- John Capodice as Bob, bus driver
- Thomas Rosales Jr. as Vinnie
- Sandy Martin as bartender

== Production ==
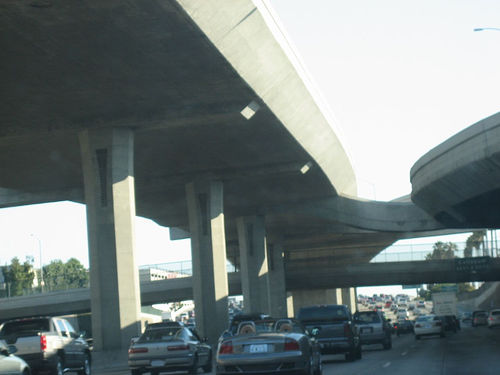
Part of the film featured the bus making its way onto Interstate 110 through the traffic.

=== Writing ===
Screenwriter Graham Yost was inspired to write Speed after hearing about the 1985 film Runaway Train from his father, Canadian television host Elwy Yost. Elwy mistakenly believed the train's out-of-control situation was caused by a bomb, (Note: Such a plot had coincidentally been used in the 1975 Japanese movie The Bullet Train.) leading Graham to think that such a concept would work better on a bus. He initially envisioned a bomb that would detonate if the bus dropped below 20 mph, but a friend suggested raising the speed limit to 50 mph. The film's ending was inspired by the 1976 film Silver Streak. Originally titled Minimum Speed, Yost renamed it Speed to avoid negative connotations associated with "minimum".

Yost's initial draft had the entire film set on the bus, with no elevator or subway sequences. The bus was meant to drive around Dodger Stadium and ultimately crash into the Hollywood Sign. After finishing the script, Yost presented it to Paramount Pictures, which showed interest and suggested John McTiernan to direct. However, McTiernan declined, feeling the script was too similar to Die Hard (1988), and recommended Jan de Bont instead. De Bont, who had been the director of photography for action films like Die Hard and The Hunt for Red October (1990), agreed to direct. Michael Bay had also expressed interest in directing.

Paramount ultimately passed on the project, believing audiences would not want to watch a film set almost entirely on a bus. Yost and de Bont then pitched the film to 20th Century Fox, who agreed to green-light the project but requested additional action sequences beyond the bus. De Bont suggested starting the movie with a bomb on an elevator, drawing from his own experience of being trapped in an elevator while working on Die Hard. Yost used this opening to establish the cleverness of LAPD SWAT officer Jack Traven, inspired by Perseus' deception with Medusa. De Bont also suggested concluding the film with a subway sequence to provide a final twist, which Fox approved.

Joss Whedon was brought in a week before filming began to rework the dialogue and improve the script. Whedon made significant contributions, including transforming Jack Traven's character from a maverick hotshot into a more earnest and polite officer, removing forced one-liners, and creating the iconic line, "Pop quiz, hotshot." Whedon also reworked minor characters, such as turning Doug Stephens (Alan Ruck) from an unpleasant lawyer into a hapless tourist. Additionally, the character of Harry Temple was originally intended to be the film's villain, but once Dennis Hopper was cast as Howard Payne, this role was adjusted, and Temple's character remained non-complicit.

According to one film studies professor, the main characters solve every major problem in Speed the same way ("acceleration"), while the story is "unified through the development of motifs and repetitions, like Jack's decision to 'shoot the hostage,' or the theme of speeding transportation."

=== Casting ===
When Speed was under development at Paramount Pictures, Jeff Speakman was originally attached to star in the lead role. However, after the project was acquired by 20th Century Fox, Speakman was dropped. Stephen Baldwin was initially offered the role of Jack Traven but declined, citing the character's similarity to John McClane from Die Hard (1988). Richard Grieco also turned down the role, later expressing regret over his decision. Other actors considered for the part included Tom Cruise, Tom Hanks, Wesley Snipes, and Woody Harrelson. Director Jan de Bont ultimately cast Keanu Reeves after seeing his performance in Point Break (1991), believing that Reeves projected a balance of vulnerability and strength. Reeves underwent physical training and cut his hair short for the role, a decision that initially concerned the studio. He also starred in River's Edge (1986) with Hopper.

The character of Annie was originally written as an African American paramedic to justify her ability to drive the bus. The role was first offered to Halle Berry, who declined, but later expressed regret over her decision. As the character evolved into a comic relief sidekick, Ellen DeGeneres was considered for the part. Eventually, the role was rewritten as a love interest for Jack Traven, leading to the casting of Sandra Bullock. Bullock auditioned alongside Reeves to ensure their on-screen chemistry, which involved performing physically demanding scenes. Meryl Streep, Kim Basinger, and Anne Heche were also offered or considered for the role but declined.

=== Filming ===
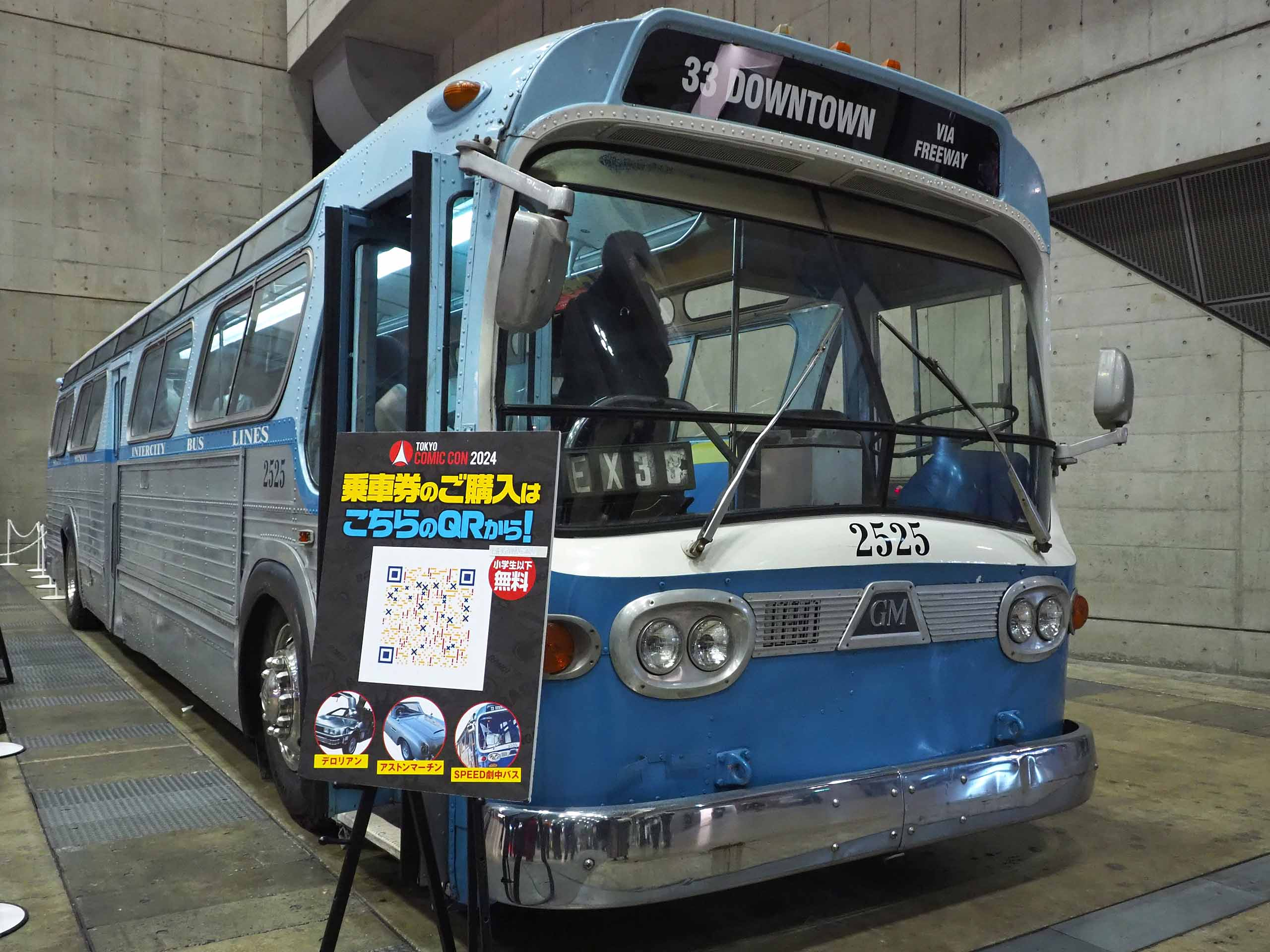
Eleven GM New Look buses were used to represent the bus in the film. Displayed at Tokyo Comic Con 2024.

Principal photography for Speed commenced on September 7, 1993, and concluded on December 23, 1993, in Los Angeles. Director Jan de Bont used an 80-foot model of a 50-story elevator shaft for the film's opening sequence. During production, River Phoenix, a close friend of actor Keanu Reeves, died. In response, de Bont adjusted the shooting schedule to accommodate Reeves, giving him less demanding scenes. De Bont noted that the loss deeply affected Reeves, making him quieter and emotionally withdrawn. Initially hesitant about the film's action sequences, Reeves expressed to de Bont, "I'm not an action hero. I don't like it. I don't know how to do it," which de Bont saw as an advantage, believing it paralleled Reeves' character, who was thrust into an extraordinary situation. As production progressed, Reeves became more involved with his stunts, even secretly rehearsing the Jaguar-to-bus jump, which he later performed himself, against de Bont's disapproval.

The production used eleven GM New Look buses (TDH-5303) and three Grumman 870 buses. Two of these buses were destroyed in explosions, while others were adapted for specific scenes, including high-speed sequences, interior shots, and "under bus" scenes. The film's fictionalized bus route, "33 Downtown", was modeled after the real-life Big Blue Bus serving Santa Monica. One of the buses used in the film was auctioned for $102,000 in 2018.

Many of the freeway scenes were shot on California's Interstate 105 and Interstate 110, specifically at the Judge Harry Pregerson Interchange, which was under construction at the time of filming. De Bont noticed unfinished sections of the freeway during a location scout and suggested adding a bus jump to the script. The bus-jump scene was filmed in one take using a specially rigged bus equipped with a ramp to allow for lift-off. The driver was suspended in a shock-absorbing harness to prevent injury during the landing. Computer-generated imagery (CGI) was later used to create the appearance of a gap in the freeway, aided by Sony Pictures Imageworks. A 2009 episode of MythBusters tested the feasibility of the bus jump and concluded that it was impossible under real-world conditions.

De Bont revealed in a DVD commentary that the bus-jump stunt did not go as planned on the first attempt. The stunt driver missed the ramp, damaging the bus beyond repair. A second bus was prepared, and a successful jump was filmed two days later, although it traveled further than expected and destroyed one of the cameras set up to capture the landing. Fortunately, another camera, placed 90 feet from the jump ramp, recorded the stunt.

The film's final scenes were shot at Mojave Airport (MHV/KMHV), which stood in for Los Angeles International Airport. Shots of the LACMTA Metro Red Line during the film's climactic subway sequence were created using a 1/8 scale model, except for the train derailment jump.

The MD520N helicopter featured in the film, registration N599DB, was later sold to the Calgary Police Service in 1995 and remained in use until 2006, after which it was sold to a private owner.

== Music ==
=== Soundtrack ===
A soundtrack album featuring "songs from and inspired by" the film was released on June 28, 1994. The soundtrack was commercially successful in Japan, being certified gold by the RIAJ in 2002.

=== Score ===
Michael Kamen was initially considered to compose the score of the film. However, De Bont chose Mark Mancina, who at the time worked in some Hans Zimmer scores like Days of Thunder, Where Sleeping Dogs Lie, and True Romance.

In addition to the soundtrack release, a separate album featuring 40 minutes of Mark Mancina's score from the film was released on August 30, 1994, by 20th Century Fox Film Scores.

La-La Land Records and Fox Music released a limited expanded version of Mark Mancina's score on February 28, 2012. The newly remastered release features 69:25 of music spread over 32 tracks (in chronological order). In addition, it includes the song "Speed" by Billy Idol.

== Reception ==
=== Box office ===
Speed was released on June 10, 1994, in 2,138 theaters across the United States and Canada. It debuted at number 1 at the US box-office, surpassing The Flintstones and City Slickers II: The Legend of Curly's Gold, and grossing $14.5 million in its opening weekend. Speed held the number one position for a week before being overtaken by Wolf, generating $12.9 million in its second weekend. In its third weekend, despite the debut of The Lion King, the film retained second place at the box office, collecting an additional $12.4 million. It enjoyed prolonged success in international markets, staying number one for 8 consecutive weeks in Australia and 10 weeks in Japan. The film set opening records for 20th Century Fox in South Korea with $216,077; Brazil with $669,725; and South Africa with $267,140.

Overall, Speed grossed $121.3 million in the United States and Canada, with an additional $229.2 million internationally, for a total worldwide gross of $350.5 million. This far exceeded its production budget, estimated between $30 million and $37 million. The film was Sandra Bullock's highest-grossing film until being surpassed by Gravity in 2013.

=== Critical response ===
Speed was well received and earned critical acclaim. On review aggregator Rotten Tomatoes, the film holds a 95% approval rating based on 79 reviews, with an average rating of 8.40/10. The site's consensus reads, "A terrific popcorn thriller, Speed is taut, tense, and energetic, with outstanding performances from Keanu Reeves, Dennis Hopper and Sandra Bullock." On Metacritic, it has a weighted average score of 78 out of 100, based on 17 critics, indicating "generally favorable reviews". Audiences polled by CinemaScore gave the film an average grade of "A" on an A+ to F scale.

Roger Ebert of The Chicago Sun-Times awarded the film a maximum of 4 stars, describing it as "manic exhilaration" and praised Reeves's transition into a credible action hero, while also commending Hopper's performance as the film's villain. On their TV show, Ebert's colleague Gene Siskel praised Reeves as "absolutely compelling" and said that "all of the sequences work." Both critics enthusiastically agreed that the film was "a lot of fun."

Peter Travers of Rolling Stone remarked that "Speed works like a charm," highlighting its entertainment value. Janet Maslin of The New York Times praised Hopper's portrayal of "crazy menace" and noted the film's swift pacing, which left little room for character development but maintained momentum. Owen Gleiberman of Entertainment Weekly gave the film an "A" rating, lauding director Jan de Bont's craftsmanship, and Richard Schickel of Time noted the film's ability to tap into common anxieties, calling it an effective thriller. The Washington Post's Desson Thomson praised the cast performances but was critical of the plot, calling it "overextended".

The film has also received long-term recognition. Quentin Tarantino named Speed as one of the top 20 films he had seen between 1992 and 2009. Entertainment Weekly ranked the film eighth on its list of "The Best Rock-'em, Sock-'em Movies of the Past 25 Years." Empire magazine included Speed in its "500 Greatest Movies of All Time" list in 2008, ranking it #451. In 2017, BBC's Mark Kermode revisited the film and declared it a "timeless masterpiece," praising its enduring appeal as an action classic.

In 2025, The Hollywood Reporter listed Speed as having the best stunts of 1994.

=== Home media ===
- On November 15, 1994, Fox Video released Speed on VHS and LaserDisc formats for the first time. Rental and video sales did very well and helped the film's domestic gross. The original VHS cassette was only available in standard 4:3 TV format at the time.
- On August 20, 1996, Fox Video re-released a VHS version of the film in widescreen alongside True Lies, The Abyss and The Last of the Mohicans, allowing the viewer to see the film in a similar format to its theatrical release.
- On November 3, 1998, 20th Century Fox Home Entertainment released Speed on DVD for the first time. The DVD contains the film in widescreen format, but only has the film's theatrical trailer.
- A special two-disc collector's edition DVD was released on July 30, 2002, as part of Fox Home Entertainment's "Five-Star Collection" series. This THX certified DVD release included two commentaries (one with director Jan De Bont and another with writer Graham Yost and producer Mark Gordon), a DTS 5.1 audio track and various behind-the-scenes featurettes. Other special features included trailers, deleted scenes, galleries and a music video. This edition was re-released as part of Fox Home's "Award Series" on February 7, 2006.
- A Blu-ray Disc edition was released on November 14, 2006, being part of the first wave releases on the format from 20th Century Fox. This edition includes the two commentaries from the special collector's edition, a trivia track, the theatrical trailer and an interactive game.
- 20th Century Studios and Walt Disney Studios Home Entertainment released the film on Ultra HD Blu-ray on May 4, 2021. This edition retains the commentaries and most of the special features from the 2002 special collector's edition DVD release.

== Accolades ==
=== Year-end lists ===
- 7th – Mack Bates, The Milwaukee Journal
- 7th – John Hurley, Staten Island Advance
- 9th – David Stupich, The Milwaukee Journal
- 9th – Joan Vadeboncoeur, Syracuse Herald American
- 9th – Michael Mills, The Palm Beach Post
- 9th – Dan Craft, The Pantagraph
- 9th – Christopher Sheid, The Munster Times
- 10th – Bob Strauss, Los Angeles Daily News
- 10th – Robert Denerstein, Rocky Mountain News
- Top 10 (listed alphabetically, not ranked) – Matt Zoller Seitz, Dallas Observer
- Top 10 (listed alphabetically, not ranked) – William Arnold, Seattle Post-Intelligencer
- Top 10 (listed alphabetically, not ranked) – Eleanor Ringel, The Atlanta Journal-Constitution
- Top 10 (listed alphabetically, not ranked) – Steve Murray, The Atlanta Journal-Constitution
- Top 10 (listed alphabetically, not ranked) – Jeff Simon, The Buffalo News
- Top 10 (not ranked) – Bob Carlton, The Birmingham News
- Best "sleepers" (not ranked) – Dennis King, Tulsa World
- "The second 10" (not ranked) – Sean P. Means, The Salt Lake Tribune
- Top 3 Runner-ups (not ranked) – Sandi Davis, The Oklahoman
- Honorable mention – Mike Clark, USA Today
- Honorable mention – Betsy Pickle, Knoxville News-Sentinel
- Honorable mention – Duane Dudek, Milwaukee Sentinel
- Honorable mention ("until the subway") – David Elliott, The San Diego Union-Tribune
- Dishonorable mention – Glenn Lovell, San Jose Mercury News

=== Awards ===
Association	Ceremony Date	Category	Recipient	Results	Ref.
Awards Circuit Community Awards	1994	Best Stunt Ensemble	Gary Hymes; Eddie Matthews; William Morts; Jimmy Ortega; Brian Smrz	Won	
Awards Circuit Community Awards	1994	Best Film Editing	John Wright	Nominated	
Awards Circuit Community Awards	1994	Best Achievement in Sound	David McMillan	Nominated	
Awards Circuit Community Awards	1994	Best Visual Effects	Boyd Shermis	Nominated	
Awards Circuit Community Awards	1994	Honorable Mentions	Jan de Bont	Won	
Academy Awards	March 27, 1995	Best Film Editing	John Wright	Nominated	
Academy Awards	March 27, 1995	Best Sound	Gregg Landaker; Steve Maslow; Bob Beemer; David MacMillan	Won	
Academy Awards	March 27, 1995	Best Sound Effects Editing	Stephen Hunter Flick	Won	
American Cinema Editors Awards	1995	Best Edited Feature Film	John Wright	Nominated	
BAFTA Awards	1995	Best Sound	Stephen Hunter Flick; Gregg Landaker; Steve Maslow; Bob Beemer; David MacMillan	Won	
BAFTA Awards	1995	Best Special Visual Effects	Boyd Shermis; John Frazier; Ron Brinkman; Richard E. Hollander	Nominated	
BAFTA Awards	1995	Best Editing	John Wright	Won	
Blockbuster Entertainment Awards	1995	Favorite Actress - Action/Adventure	Sandra Bullock	Won	
BMI Film & TV Awards	1995	BMI Film Music Award	Mark Mancina	Won	
Chicago Film Critics Association Awards	1995	Most Promising Actress	Sandra Bullock	Nominated	
Cinema Audio Society Awards	1995	Outstanding Achievement in Sound Mixing for Feature Films	Gregg Landaker; Steve Maslow; Bob Beemer; David MacMillan	Nominated	
Edgar Allan Poe Awards	1995	Best Motion Picture	Graham Yost	Nominated	
Golden Camera Awards	1995	Golden Screen	—N/a	Won	
Japan Academy Prize Awards	1995	Best Foreign Film	—N/a	Nominated	
Jupiter Awards	1994	Best International Actress	Sandra Bullock	Won	
Motion Picture Sound Editors Awards	1995	Best Sound Editing - Sound Effects & Foley, Domestic Feature Film	Stephen Hunter Flick; Donald Flick; David E. Stone; Eric Potter; Paul Berolzheimer; David Bartlett; John Dunn; Patricio A. Libenson; Dean Beville; John T. Cucci; Ken Dufva; Judee Flick; Avram D. Gold; Warren Hamilton Jr. Greg Hedgepath; Dean Manly; Dan O'Connell; Catherine Rowe; Joan Rowe; Kirk Schuler; Bruce Stubblefield; Solange S. Schwalbe	Won	
MTV Movie + TV Awards	June 10, 1995	Best Movie	—N/a	Nominated	
MTV Movie + TV Awards	June 10, 1995	Best Male Performance	Keanu Reeves	Nominated	
MTV Movie + TV Awards	June 10, 1995	Best Female Performance	Sandra Bullock	Won	
MTV Movie + TV Awards	June 10, 1995	Best On-Screen Duo	Keanu Reeves; Sandra Bullock	Won	
MTV Movie + TV Awards	June 10, 1995	Best Kiss	Keanu Reeves; Sandra Bullock	Nominated	
MTV Movie + TV Awards	June 10, 1995	Most Desirable Male	Keanu Reeves	Nominated	
MTV Movie + TV Awards	June 10, 1995	Most Desirable Female	Sandra Bullock	Won	
MTV Movie + TV Awards	June 10, 1995	Best Villain	Dennis Hopper	Won	
MTV Movie + TV Awards	June 10, 1995	Best Action Sequence - for the bus escape/airplane explosion	—N/a	Won	
Nickelodeon Kid's Choice Awards	May 20, 1995	Favorite Movie	—N/a	Nominated	
Nickelodeon Kid's Choice Awards	May 20, 1995	Favorite Movie Actor	Keanu Reeves	Nominated	
Nickelodeon Kid's Choice Awards	May 20, 1995	Favorite Movie Actress	Sandra Bullock	Nominated	
Nikkan Sports Film Awards	1995	Best Foreign Film	—N/a	Won	
Saturn Awards	June 26, 1995	Best Action/Adventure-Thriller Film	—N/a	Nominated	
Saturn Awards	June 26, 1995	Best Director	Jan de Bont	Nominated	
Saturn Awards	June 26, 1995	Best Actress	Sandra Bullock	Won (Note: Tied with Jamie Lee Curtis for True Lies.)	

American Film Institute recognition:

- 100 Years...100 Thrills: No. 99
- 100 Years...100 Heroes and Villains:
  - Jack Traven & Annie Porter - Nominated Heroes

== Sequel ==
On June 13, 1997, Speed 2: Cruise Control, a sequel to Speed, was released to overwhelming negative reviews and poor box-office performance. Sandra Bullock reprised her role as Annie, reportedly in exchange for financial backing on another project, but Keanu Reeves declined to return as Jack Traven. As a result, Jason Patric was cast as Alex Shaw, Annie's new boyfriend, with the storyline explaining that she and Jack had broken up due to her concerns over Jack's dangerous profession. Willem Dafoe portrayed the villain, John Geiger, while Glenn Plummer, who played a carjacking victim in the first film, made a cameo as the same character, this time involved with a boat. Speed 2 is widely regarded as one of the worst sequels ever made, holding a 4% approval rating on Rotten Tomatoes based on 71 reviews.

== Legacy ==
- The level "Velocity" in the 2005 video game Pursuit Force is an adaptation of the main premise of the movie, inasmuch as both feature a police officer rescuing hostages from a bomb-rigged bus that will explode if it slows down.
- During the beginning of the video game live-action film Sonic the Hedgehog (2020), a scene shows the bus on fire after the explosion that caught Jack Traven's attention. Howard Payne is shown saying, "Pop quiz, hotshot" and Sonic repeatedly says it, which he uses later in the bar fight scene.
- On October 8, 2024, de Bont, Reeves and Bullock reunited for a Q&A session at the Egyptian Theatre in Los Angeles to celebrate the film's 30th anniversary.

== See also ==
- The Doomsday Flight, a 1966 TV-movie in which a bomb will explode if a plane descends to land.
- The Bullet Train, a 1975 film in which a bomb will explode on a train if its speed falls below 50 miles per hour.
