= Ron Brinkmann =

American visual effects supervisors

Ron Brinkmann (born 1964), a visual effects supervisor and a founding employee of Sony Imageworks. While there he was nominated for a BAFTA Award for Best Special Visual Effects for his work on the movie Speed. He later co-founded Nothing Real, a software company that produced the digital compositing application Shake. Nothing Real was acquired in 2002 by Apple.

Brinkmann is also the author of the book The Art and Science of Digital Compositing (ISBN 0-12-133960-2).

He is a regular guest in the podcast 'This Week in Photography'.
