= Tom Johnson (sound engineer) =

American sound engineer

- Occupation: Sound engineer
- Years active: 1983-present

Thomas Johnson is an American sound engineer. He has won two Academy Awards for Best Sound and has been nominated for seven more in the same category. He has worked on more than 125 films since 1983.

== Selected filmography ==
Johnson has won two Academy Awards for Best Sound and has been nominated for another seven:

Won

- Terminator 2: Judgment Day (1991)
- Titanic (1997)

Nominated

- Forrest Gump (1994)
- Contact (1997)
- Star Wars: Episode I – The Phantom Menace (1999)
- Cast Away (2000)
- The Polar Express (2004)
- War Horse (2011)
- Ad Astra (2019)
