= Jacques Stroweis =

- Born: Paris, France
- Occupation: Visual effects supervisor
- Years active: 1990-present
- Spouse: Monica Zgutowicz
- Website: www.jacquesStroweis.com

Jacques Stroweis is a visual effects supervisor and computer graphics researcher who began his career as a member of New York Institute of Technology Computer Graphics Lab (NYIT CG Lab), regarded at the time as the top computer graphics animation research and development group in the world. The lab produced many firsts in the field, and its alumni now form the elite of the CG and computer world.

Stroweis was among the first wave of research scientists from the New York Institute of Technology Computer Graphics Lab to transition directly into production, following in the footsteps of Ed Catmull, who went on to form Lucasfilm and Pixar. This pioneering move set a precedent that influenced the integration of research methodologies into digital visual effects, shaping the way modern VFX workflows are approached today.

Stroweis was nominated at the 67th Academy Awards in the category of Best Visual Effects for James Cameron’s True Lies, a film that raised the bar for photorealism in feature films through its innovative use of digital compositing and integration of the visual effects with the live-action footage. Stroweis is the first French citizen to receive an Academy Award nomination for digital visual effects, marking a significant milestone in the history of CGI and digital storytelling.

Continuing his legacy of technological innovation, Stroweis is now advancing the next generation of photorealistic visuals in the new frontier of On-set virtual production, bridging the gap between traditional VFX and cutting-edge real-time technology.

A native of Paris, Stroweis holds three M.S. degrees in Physics, Electrical and Mechanical Engineering, and a Diplôme d'Ingénieur in Electrical Engineering from a Grande École in France. He is a two-time recipient of the Unreal Engine Fellowship. Stroweis is a dual EU/U.S. citizen and speaks English, French, German, and Mandarin.

== Selected filmography ==
- Predator 2 (1990)
- Demolition Man (1993)
- Last Action Hero (1993)
- True Lies (1994)
- Species (1995)
- Broken Arrow (1996)
- The Covenant (2006)
- Ghost Rider (2007)
- Underworld: Rise of the Lycans (2009)
- Robosapien: Rebooted (2013)
- Dracula: The Dark Prince (2013)
- The Monkey King 2 (2016)
- S.M.A.R.T Chase (2017)
- Tiger Robbers (2021)
- The First Monkey King (animation) (2023)
- Lisa Frankenstein (2024)
