= Dennis S. Sands =

American sound engineer

- Occupation: Sound engineer
- Years active: 1979–present

Dennis S. Sands is an American sound engineer. He has been nominated for four Academy Awards in the category Best Sound. He has worked on more than 400 films since 1979 and is best known for his collaborations with composers Alan Silvestri and Danny Elfman.

== Selected filmography ==
| Year | Title | Director(s) | Composer(s) | Roles | Other notes |
|---|---|---|---|---|---|
| 1979 | Rocky II | Sylvester Stallone | Bill Conti | Scoring Mixer | |
| 1980 | Xanadu | Robert Greenwald | Barry De Vorzon | Music Scoring Mixer | |
| 1980 | Inside Moves | Richard Donner | John Barry | Music Scoring Mixer | |
| 1981 | Escape from New York | John Carpenter | John Carpenter, Alan Howarth | Scoring Recordist | |
| 1984 | Romancing the Stone | Robert Zemeckis | Alan Silvestri | Music Scoring Mixer | First collaboration with Zemeckis and Silvestri |
| 1985 | Cat's Eye | Lewis Teague | Alan Silvestri | Music Scoring Mixer | |
| 1985 | Back to the Future | Robert Zemeckis | Alan Silvestri | Music Scoring Mixer | |
| 1988 | Who Framed Roger Rabbit | Robert Zemeckis | Alan Silvestri | Music Scoring Mixer | |
| 1989 | The Abyss | James Cameron | Alan Silvestri | Music Scoring Mixer | |
| 1989 | Back to the Future Part II | Robert Zemeckis | Alan Silvestri | Music Scoring Mixer | |
| 1990 | Downtown | Richard Benjamin | Alan Silvestri | Music Scoring Mixer | Uncredited |
| 1990 | Back to the Future Part III | Robert Zemeckis | Alan Silvestri | Music Scoring Mixer/Re-Recording Mixer | |
| 1990 | Dick Tracy | Warren Beatty | Danny Elfman | Score Recordist | Music Editor: Bob Badami First collaboration with Elfman |
| 1990 | Darkman | Sam Raimi | Danny Elfman | Music Scoring Mixer | First collaboration with Raimi |
| 1991 | Father of the Bride | Charles Shyer | Alan Silvestri | Music Scoring Mixer (with Bob Fernandez and Bruce Botnick) | First collaboration with Shyer |
| 1992 | FernGully: The Last Rainforest | Bill Kroyer | Alan Silvestri | Music Scoring Mixer | |
| 1993 | Army of Darkness | Sam Raimi | Danny Elfman ("March of the Dead" Theme), Joseph LoDuca | Music Scoring Mixer | |
| 1993 | Cop and a Half | Henry Winkler | Alan Silvestri | Music Scoring Mixer | Uncredited Electronic Remix Engineer: Simon Franglen |
| 1993 | Super Mario Bros. | Rocky Morton, Annabel Jankel | Alan Silvestri | Music Scoring Mixer | Orchestrator: William Ross Music Supervisor: Peter Afterman |
| 1994 | Forrest Gump | Robert Zemeckis | Alan Silvestri | Music Scoring Mixer | |
| 1994 | Blown Away | Stephen Hopkins | Alan Silvestri | Music Scoring Mixer | |
| 1994 | The Shawshank Redemption | Frank Darabont | Thomas Newman | Music Scoring Mixer | First collaboration with Newman |
| 1994 | Richie Rich | Donald Petrie | Alan Silvestri | Music Scoring Mixer | |
| 1995 | The American President | Rob Reiner | Marc Shaiman | Music Scoring Mixer | |
| 1995 | Father of the Bride Part II | Charles Shyer | Alan Silvestri | Music Scoring Mixer | |
| 1996 | Independence Day | Roland Emmerich | David Arnold | Scoring Mixer | First collaboration with Emmerich |
| 1996 | The Long Kiss Goodnight | Renny Harlin | Alan Silvestri | Music Scoring Mixer | |
| 1997 | Contact | Robert Zemeckis | Alan Silvestri | Music Scoring Mixer | |
| 1997 | Alien Resurrection | Jean-Pierre Jeunet | John Frizzell | Scoring Mixer | |
| 1998 | The Horse Whisperer | Robert Redford | Thomas Newman | Score Recordist & Mixer | Music Consultant: George Budd Additional Recordists: Paul Wertheimer, Tom Hardisty |
| 1998 | The Parent Trap | Nancy Meyers | Alan Silvestri | Score Recordist & Mixer | Music Consultant & Editor: Andrew Silver |
| 1999 | American Beauty | Sam Mendes | Thomas Newman | Music Scoring Mixer | |
| 1999 | Stuart Little | Rob Minkoff | Alan Silvestri | Score Recordist & Mixer | First collaboration with Minkoff |
| 2000 | Reindeer Games | John Frankenheimer | Alan Silvestri | Music Scoring Mixer | |
| 2000 | The Family Man | Brett Ratner | Danny Elfman | Music Scoring Mixer | First collaboration with Ratner |
| 2001 | The Mummy Returns | Stephen Sommers | Alan Silvestri | Music Scoring Mixer | First collaboration with Sommers |
| 2002 | Spider-Man | Sam Raimi | Danny Elfman | Score Recordist & Mixer | |
| 2002 | Men in Black II | Barry Sonnenfeld | Danny Elfman | Score Recordist & Mixer | First collaboration with Sonnenfeld |
| 2002 | Lilo & Stitch | Chris Sanders, Dean DeBlois | Alan Silvestri | Music Recordist & Mixer | |
| 2002 | Stuart Little 2 | Rob Minkoff | Alan Silvestri | Recordist & Mixer | |
| 2002 | Punch-Drunk Love | Paul Thomas Anderson | Jon Brion | Orchestra Recordist & Mixer | Score Recordist: Greg Dennen |
| 2002 | Chicago | Rob Marshall | Danny Elfman (Original Score Music), John Kander | Original Score Music Recordist and Mixer | Original Score Music Conductor & Orchestrator: Steve Bartek |
| 2004 | Van Helsing | Stephen Sommers | Alan Silvestri | Music Recordist & Mixer | Also Sound Mixer Score Recordist: Adam Michalak |
| 2004 | The Bourne Supremacy | Paul Greengrass | John Powell | Music Recordist & Mixer | Additional Scoring Mixers: Eric Zobler, Steve Kempster |
| 2004 | The Polar Express | Robert Zemeckis | Alan Silvestri | Re-Recording Mixer/Music Recording Mixer | Music Score Programmer: David Bifano |
| 2005 | xXx: State of the Union | Lee Tamahori | Marco Beltrami | Score Mixer | Additional Guitar: Tom Morello |
| 2005 | Guess Who | Kevin Rodney Sullivan | John Murphy | Music Scoring Mixer | |
| 2005 | Cheaper by the Dozen 2 | Adam Shankman | John Debney | Music Scoring Mixer | |
| 2006 | The Wild | Steve "Spaz" Williams | Alan Silvestri | Score Recordist and Mixer | |
| 2006 | Nacho Libre | Jared Hess | Danny Elfman | Music Recordist and Mixer | |
| 2006 | Night at the Museum | Shawn Levy | Alan Silvestri | Score Recordist and Mixer | First collaboration with Levy |
| 2007 | Are We Done Yet? | Steve Carr | Teddy Castellucci | Score Recordist and Mixer (with Shawn Murphy) | Additional Music: Kevin Kliesch |
| 2007 | The Kingdom | Peter Berg | Danny Elfman | Score Mixer | Score Recordists: Noah Scott Snyder, Ray Pyle |
| 2007 | Bee Movie | Simon J. Smith, Steve Hickner | Rupert Gregson-Williams | Score Recordist (with Geoff Foster) | Executive Music Producer: Hans Zimmer Additional Music: Lorne Balfe |
| 2009 | He's Just Not That Into You | Ken Kwapis | Cliff Eidelman | Score Recordist and Mixer | |
| 2009 | Night at the Museum: Battle of the Smithsonian | Shawn Levy | Alan Silvestri | Score Recordist & Mixer (with Steve Kempster) | Digital Recordists: Adam Olmstead, Larry Mah Stage Recordist: Tim Lauber |
| 2009 | G.I. Joe: The Rise of Cobra | Stephen Sommers | Alan Silvestri | Music Recordist and Mixer | Scoring Coordinator: Dave Bifano Additional Music Recordist and Mixer: Stephen Kempster |
| 2011 | Captain America: The First Avenger | Joe Johnston | Alan Silvestri | Music Recordist & Mixer | First collaboration with Marvel Studios |
| 2012 | The Avengers | Zak Penn | Alan Silvestri | Music Recordist & Mixer | |
| 2012 | Men in Black 3 | Barry Sonnenfeld | Danny Elfman | Score Recordist & Mixer (with Shawn Murphy) | |
| 2013 | The Croods | Chris Sanders, Kirk DeMicco | Alan Silvestri | Score Recordist & Mixer | Additional Recordist: Pete Cobbin |
| 2013 | Pacific Rim | Guillermo del Toro | Ramin Djawadi | Score Recordist (with Dave Way, Steve Kaplan & Satoshi Mark Noguchi) | Music Scoring Mixer: Alan Meyerson First collaboration with Djawadi |
| 2014 | Godzilla | Gareth Edwards | Alexandre Desplat | Score Recordist & Mixer | Additional Recordist: Brad Haehnel |
| 2014 | The Maze Runner | Wes Ball | John Paesano | Score Recordist & Mixer | First collaboration with Ball and Paesano |
| 2014 | Penguins of Madagascar | Eric Darnell, Simon J. Smith | Lorne Balfe | Score Mixer | First collaboration with Balfe |
| 2015 | Goosebumps | Rob Letterman | Danny Elfman | Recordist & Mixer (with Noah Snyder) | Additional Music: Chris Bacon, TJ Lindgren, Paul Mounsey |
| 2016 | Alice Through the Looking Glass | James Bobin | Danny Elfman | Score Mixer | Score Recordist: Peter Cobbin Additional Music: Chris Bacon, T.J. Lindgren |
| 2016 | Independence Day: Resurgence | Roland Emmerich | Harald Kloser, Thomas Wanker | Score Recordist | |
| 2016 | Ice Age: Collision Course | Michael Thurmeier, Galen Tan Chu | John Debney | Additional Mixer | Score Recordist: Shawn Murphy Score Mixer: Brad Haehnel |
| 2016 | Allied | Robert Zemeckis | Alan Silvestri | Re-Recording Mixer/Score Recordist & Mixer | |
| 2018 | Maze Runner: The Death Cure | Wes Ball | John Paesano | Score Recordist & Mixer | |
| 2018 | Ready Player One | Steven Spielberg | Alan Silvestri | Music Recordist & Mixer | |
| 2018 | Avengers: Infinity War | Anthony and Joe Russo | Alan Silvestri | Score Mixer | Score Orchestrator & Conductor: Mark Graham First collaboration with The Russo Brothers |
| 2018 | Christopher Robin | Marc Forster | Geoff Zanelli, Jon Brion | Score Recordist & Mixer (with Greg Koller) | |
| 2018 | Welcome to Marwen | Robert Zemeckis | Alan Silvestri | Re-Recording Mixer / Score Mixer | |
| 2019 | Captain Marvel | Anna Boden and Ryan Fleck | Alan Silvestri (Mid Credits Scene), Pinar Toprak | Score Mixer (Mid Credits Scene) | Uncredited Score Mixer: Alan Meyerson |
| 2019 | Wonder Park | Dylan Brown | Steven Price | Score Recordist | Score Mixer: Gareth Cousins |
| 2019 | Dumbo | Tim Burton | Danny Elfman | Score Mixer | Additional Engineering: Noah Snyder |
| 2019 | Avengers: Endgame | Anthony and Joe Russo | Alan Silvestri | Score Mixer / Additional Recordist | |
| 2019 | The Secret Life of Pets 2 | Chris Renaud | Alexandre Desplat | Score Recordist and Additional Mixer | Score Mixer: Frank Wolf |
| 2019 | Men in Black: International | F. Gary Gray | Danny Elfman, Chris Bacon | Score Recordist | Score Mixer: Noah Snyder |
| 2020 | The Witches | Robert Zemeckis | Alan Silvestri | Score Mixer | |
| 2022 | Doctor Strange in the Multiverse of Madness | Sam Raimi | Danny Elfman | Score Mixer | |
| 2022 | Pinocchio | Robert Zemeckis | Alan Silvestri | Re-Recording Mixer / Score Mixer | |
| 2023 | Leo | Robert Marianetti, Robert Smigel, David Wachtenheim | Geoff Zanelli (Score), Robert Smigel (Songs) | Score and Songs Mixer / Additional Music Recordist | Score Recordist: Nick Wollage Digital Score Recordist: Chris Barnett |
| 2024 | Beverly Hills Cop: Axel F | Mark Molloy | Lorne Balfe | Recording Engineer | |
| 2025 | The Electric State | Anthony & Joe Russo | Alan Silvestri | Music Mixer | |
| 2025 | Play Dirty | Shane Black | Alan Silvestri | Score Mixer | Score Orchestrator & Conductor: Mark Graham |
| 2026 | Send Help | Sam Raimi | Danny Elfman | Score Mixer | |
| 2026 | Behemoth! | Tony Gilroy | James Newton Howard, Alan Silvestri, Brandon Roberts, Michael Abels, Emily Bear, Lukas Frank, Michael Giacchino, Henry Jackman, Nami Melumad | Music Recordist & Mixer | |
| 2026 | The Social Reckoning | Aaron Sorkin | Alexandre Desplat | Music Score Recordist & Mixer | |
| 2026 | Avengers: Doomsday | Anthony & Joe Russo | Alan Silvestri | Music Recordist & Mixer | |

- South Park: Bigger, Longer, and Uncut (1999; with Tim Boyle)
- Cast Away (2000)
- Dreamgirls (2006)
- The Ant Bully (2006; with Shawn Murphy)
- Hellboy II: The Golden Army (2008)
- Milk (2008)
- Wanted (2008)
- Alice in Wonderland (2010)
- Contagion (2011)
- Puss in Boots (2011)
- Argo (2012)
- Flight (2012)
- The Walk (2015)
