= Ron Judkins =

American sound mixer

- Born: 1953 (age 72–73); Little Rock, Arkansas
- Occupation: Production sound mixer
- Years active: 1974-present

Ron Judkins (born 1953) is an American production sound mixer and writer-director. He has won two Academy Awards for Best Sound and has been nominated for another three in the same category. He is also the winner of the BAFTA Award for Best Sound for Schindler's List in 1996. Judkins directed his first feature film, The Hi-Line in 1998, and the project premiered in the Dramatic Competition at the 1999 Sundance Film Festival.

Judkins is also the writer-director of the comedic drama, Finding Neighbors, a feature film, which had its world premiere in the Narrative Competition at the Austin Film Festival in 2013. He also directed the 2013 documentary 24 Peaces which includes interviews with Desmond Tutu, Marianne Williamson, and Deepak Chopra.

== Selected filmography ==
Judkins has worked on more than 50 films as a production sound mixer. He has won two Academy Awards for Best Sound and has been nominated for another three:

Won

- Jurassic Park (1993)
- Saving Private Ryan (1998)

Nominated

- Schindler's List (1993)
- War of the Worlds (2005)
- Lincoln (2012)
