= Shawn Murphy (sound engineer) =

American sound engineer

- Born: Shawn Edward Murphy; May 16, 1948 (age 78); Los Angeles, California United States
- Occupation: Sound engineer
- Years active: 1983–present

Shawn Murphy (born May 16, 1948) is an American sound engineer. He has won an Academy Award for Best Sound and has been nominated for another three in the same category. He has worked on more than 400 films since 1983.

== Selected filmography ==
Murphy has won an Academy Award for Best Sound and has been nominated for another three:

Won

- Jurassic Park (1993)

Nominated

- Indiana Jones and the Last Crusade (1989)
- Star Wars: Episode I – The Phantom Menace (1999)
- West Side Story (2021)
