= 1995 MTV Movie Awards =

American film awards ceremony

- Date: Saturday, June 10, 1995
- Location: Warner Bros. Studios, Burbank, California
- Country: United States
- Hosted by: Jon Lovitz and Courteney Cox

Television/radio coverage
- Network: MTV

The 1995 MTV Movie Awards were hosted by Jon Lovitz and Courteney Cox and took place at Warner Bros. Studios in Burbank, California, and aired on MTV on Saturday, June 10, 1995.

== Performances ==
- TLC — "Waterfalls"
- The Ramones — "Best Song from a Movie Medley"
- Boyz II Men — "Water Runs Dry"
- Blues Traveler — "Run-Around"

== Presenters ==
- Val Kilmer — presented Most Desirable Female
- Robert Downey Jr. — presented Best Comedic Performance
- Juliette Lewis — presented Breakthrough Performance
- Julianne Moore — presented Best Male Performance
- Jon Lovitz and Courteney Cox — presented Most Desirable Male
- Cindy Crawford and William Baldwin — presented Best On-Screen Duo
- Jon Lovitz — introduced The Ramones
- Jon Lovitz and Courteney Cox — Best Song from a Movie
- Ice-T — presented Best Action Sequence
- Quentin Tarantino — presented Lifetime Achievement Award
- Cameron Diaz and Chris Isaak — presented Best Kiss
- Eric Stoltz and Alicia Silverstone — presented Best Dance Sequence
- Jodie Foster — presented Best New Filmmaker
- George Clooney — presented Best Villain
- Chazz Palminteri — presented Best Female Performance
- Sharon Stone — presented Best Movie

== Winners and nominees ==
Below are the list of nominations. Winners are listed first and highlighted in bold.

Best Movie	Best Male Performance
**Pulp Fiction**; The Crow; Forrest Gump; Interview with the Vampire; Speed	**Brad Pitt – Interview with the Vampire**; Tom Hanks – Forrest Gump; Brandon Lee – The Crow; Keanu Reeves – Speed; John Travolta – Pulp Fiction
Best Female Performance	Most Desirable Male
**Sandra Bullock – Speed**; Jamie Lee Curtis – True Lies; Jodie Foster – Nell; Uma Thurman – Pulp Fiction; Meg Ryan – When a Man Loves a Woman	**Brad Pitt – Interview with the Vampire**; Tom Cruise – Interview with the Vampire; Christian Slater – Interview with the Vampire; Andy García – When a Man Loves a Woman; Keanu Reeves – Speed
Most Desirable Female	Breakthrough Performance
**Sandra Bullock – Speed**; Cameron Diaz – The Mask; Demi Moore – Disclosure; Halle Berry – The Flintstones; Sharon Stone – The Specialist	**Kirsten Dunst – Interview with the Vampire**; Cameron Diaz – The Mask; Hugh Grant – Four Weddings and a Funeral; Mykelti Williamson – Forrest Gump; Tim Allen – The Santa Clause
Best On-Screen Duo	Best Villain
**Sandra Bullock and Keanu Reeves – Speed**; Jim Carrey and Jeff Daniels – Dumb & Dumber; Tom Cruise and Brad Pitt – Interview with the Vampire; Juliette Lewis and Woody Harrelson – Natural Born Killers; Samuel L. Jackson and John Travolta – Pulp Fiction	**Dennis Hopper – Speed**; Tom Cruise – Interview with the Vampire; Jeremy Irons – The Lion King; Tommy Lee Jones – Blown Away; Demi Moore – Disclosure
Best Comedic Performance	Best Song from a Movie
**Jim Carrey – Dumb & Dumber**; Tim Allen – The Santa Clause; Tom Arnold – True Lies; Jim Carrey – The Mask; Adam Sandler – Billy Madison	**Stone Temple Pilots — "Big Empty" (from The Crow)**; Elton John — "Can You Feel the Love Tonight?" (from The Lion King); Urge Overkill — "Girl, You'll Be a Woman Soon" (from Pulp Fiction); Madonna — "I'll Remember" (from With Honors); Warren G — "Regulate" (from Above the Rim)
Best Kiss	Best Action Sequence
**Lauren Holly and Jim Carrey – Dumb & Dumber**; Julie Delpy and Ethan Hawke – Before Sunrise; Juliette Lewis and Woody Harrelson – Natural Born Killers; Sandra Bullock and Keanu Reeves – Speed; Jamie Lee Curtis and Arnold Schwarzenegger – True Lies	**Bus Escape/Airplane Explosion – Speed**; Escape from Exploding Ship – Blown Away; Ambush of CI Convoy – Clear and Present Danger; Bridge Explosion/Limo Rescue – True Lies
Best Dance Sequence	Best New Filmmaker
**John Travolta and Uma Thurman — "You Never Can Tell" (from Pulp Fiction)**; Jim Carrey and Cameron Diaz — "Hey! Pachuco!" (from The Mask); Christopher Daniel Barnes, Christine Taylor, Paul Sutera, Jennifer Elise Cox, Jesse Lee and Olivia Hack — "Sunshine Day" (from The Brady Bunch Movie); Arnold Schwarzenegger and Tia Carrere — "Por una Cabeza" (from True Lies)	**Steve James – Hoop Dreams**
Lifetime Achievement Award
**Jackie Chan**
