= Steve Maslow =

American sound engineer (1944–2026)

- Born: October 17, 1944; Los Angeles, California, U.S.
- Died: April 27, 2026 (aged 81); West Hills, California, U.S.
- Occupation: Sound engineer
- Years active: 1978–2023

Steve Maslow (October 17, 1944 – April 27, 2026) was an American sound engineer. He won three Academy Awards for Best Sound and was nominated for four more in the same category. Maslow also won the AACTA Award for Best Sound for The Great Gatsby in 2013. He worked on more than 200 films since 1978.

Maslow died from cancer in a therapy facility in West Hills on April 27, 2026, at the age of 81.

== Selected filmography ==
Maslow won three Academy Awards for Best Sound and was nominated for four more in the same category.

Won

- Star Wars — Episode V: The Empire Strikes Back (1980)
- Raiders of the Lost Ark (1981)
- Speed (1994)

Nominated

- Dune (1984)
- Waterworld (1995)
- Twister (1996)
- U-571 (2000)
