= David MacMillan (sound engineer) =

American sound engineer

- Occupation: Sound engineer
- Years active: 1973 – present

David MacMillan is an American sound engineer. He has won three Academy Awards for Best Sound. He has worked on over 70 films since 1973.

== Selected filmography ==
- The Right Stuff (1983)
- Speed (1994)
- Apollo 13 (1995)
