= Gregg Landaker =

American re-recording mixer

- Born: 1951 (age 74–75)
- Occupation: Re-recording mixer
- Years active: 1979-2017

Gregg Landaker (born 1951) is a retired American re-recording mixer. He won four Academy Awards for Best Sound and has been nominated for five more in the same category. He worked on 207 films from 1979 until his retirement in 2017, when he decided that the film Dunkirk would be the final film he would work on.

== Selected filmography ==
Landaker has won four Academy Awards for Best Sound and has been nominated for five more in the same category.

Won

- The Empire Strikes Back (1980)
- Raiders of the Lost Ark (1981)
- Speed (1994)
- Dunkirk (2017)

Nominated

- JFK (1991)
- Waterworld (1995)
- Twister (1996)
- U-571 (2000)
- Interstellar (2014)
