= Bob Beemer =

American sound mixer

- Born: February 8, 1955 (age 71); Hollywood, California United States
- Occupation: Sound engineer
- Years active: 1989 – present

Robert Joseph Beemer (born February 8, 1955) is an American sound mixer who has won four Oscars.

== Biography ==
Bob Beemer was born on February 8, 1955, at Hollywood Presbyterian Medical Center in Hollywood, California. Graduating from Loyola High School, Los Angeles in 1973, he studied Communication Arts and English at Loyola Marymount University in Los Angeles, California, earning a bachelor's degree in 1977 with a double major in those two fields. Always fascinated by sound, he became an expert in remixing for movies. His first professionally recorded sound was on Roots (1977).

== Academy Awards ==
Beemer has won four Academy Awards for Best Sound and has been nominated for another three:

Won

- Speed (1994)
- Gladiator (2000)
- Ray (2004)
- Dreamgirls (2006)

Nominated

- Cliffhanger (1993)
- Independence Day (1996)
- Road to Perdition (2002)
