= 67th Academy Awards =

- Official poster by Saul Bass
- Date: March 27, 1995
- Site: Shrine Auditorium; Los Angeles, California, U.S.
- Hosted by: David Letterman
- Produced by: Gil Cates
- Directed by: Jeff Margolis

Highlights
- Best Picture: Forrest Gump
- Most awards: Forrest Gump (6)
- Most nominations: Forrest Gump (13)

TV in the United States
- Network: ABC
- Duration: 3 hours, 32 minutes
- Ratings: 48.28 million 32.5% (Nielsen ratings)

The 67th Academy Awards ceremony, organized by the Academy of Motion Picture Arts and Sciences (AMPAS) took place on March 27, 1995, at the Shrine Auditorium in Los Angeles beginning at 6:00 p.m. PST / 9:00 p.m. EST. During the ceremony, AMPAS presented Academy Awards (commonly referred to as the Oscars) in 23 categories honoring the films released in 1994. The ceremony, televised in the United States by ABC, was produced by Gilbert Cates and directed by Jeff Margolis. Comedian David Letterman hosted the show for the first time. Three weeks earlier in a ceremony held at the Regent Beverly Wilshire Hotel in Beverly Hills, California on March 4, the Academy Awards for Technical Achievement were presented by host Jamie Lee Curtis.

Forrest Gump won six awards, including Best Picture. Other winners included Ed Wood, The Lion King, and Speed with two awards and The Adventures of Priscilla, Queen of the Desert; Blue Sky, Bob's Birthday, Bullets Over Broadway, Burnt by the Sun, Franz Kafka's It's a Wonderful Life, Legends of the Fall, The Madness of King George, Maya Lin: A Strong Clear Vision, Pulp Fiction, A Time for Justice, and Trevor with one. The telecast garnered more than 48 million viewers in the United States, making it the most watched Oscars telecast since the 55th Academy Awards in 1983.

== Winners and nominees ==
The nominees for the 67th Academy Awards were announced on February 14, 1995, at the Samuel Goldwyn Theater in Beverly Hills, California, by Arthur Hiller, the then-president of the Academy, and actress Angela Bassett. Forrest Gump earned the most nominations with thirteen. It was the most nominated film since 1966's Who's Afraid of Virginia Woolf? and the fifth film to earn that many nominations. Bullets Over Broadway, Pulp Fiction, and The Shawshank Redemption tied for second with seven each.

The winners were announced during the awards ceremony on March 27, 1995. Forrest Gump was the highest grossing Best Picture winner in history. For only the second time in Oscar history, three of the four acting winners were previous winners. The 11th ceremony held in 1939 previously accomplished this feat. Best Actor winner Tom Hanks became the fifth performer to win consecutive acting Oscars and the second person to do so in the aforementioned category since Spencer Tracy won for his performances in Captains Courageous (1937) and Boys Town (1938). He also was the sixth person to win Best Actor twice. Best Supporting Actress winner Dianne Wiest became the first person to win two acting Oscars for performances in films directed by the same person. (Note: Walter Brennan's first Oscar-winning role in Come and Get It (1936) was partially directed by William Wyler, the same director who helmed his third winning role in The Westerner (1940). (Brennan's second win for Kentucky (1938) had no connection to Wyler.) However, Wyler was coerced into finishing Come and Get It after producer Samuel Goldwyn fired original director, Howard Hawks—who completed two-thirds of the film, albeit after significantly modifying the adaptation of Edna Ferber's original story. Wyler reluctantly allowed his name to have shared credit, but later disowned the film from his filmography. Otherwise, Brennan would have been the first to claim this laurel, technically.) She first won in that same category for her role in Woody Allen's 1986 film Hannah and Her Sisters. Franz Kafka's It's a Wonderful Life and Trevor's joint win in the Best Live Action Short category marked the fifth occurrence of a tie in Oscar history; the next tie would occur at the 85th Academy Awards in 2013.

=== Awards ===
Steve Tisch, Best Picture co-winner

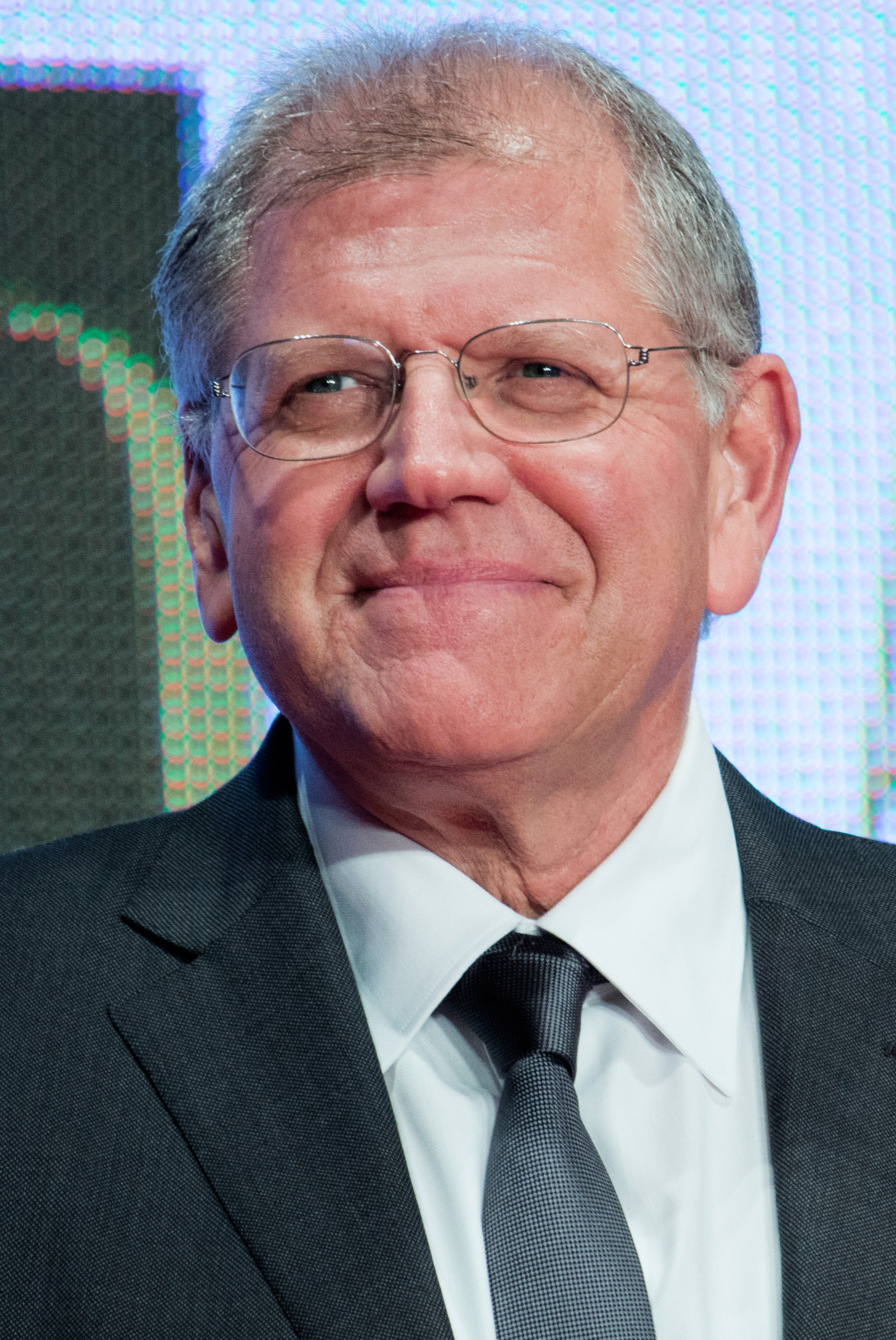
Robert Zemeckis, Best Director winner

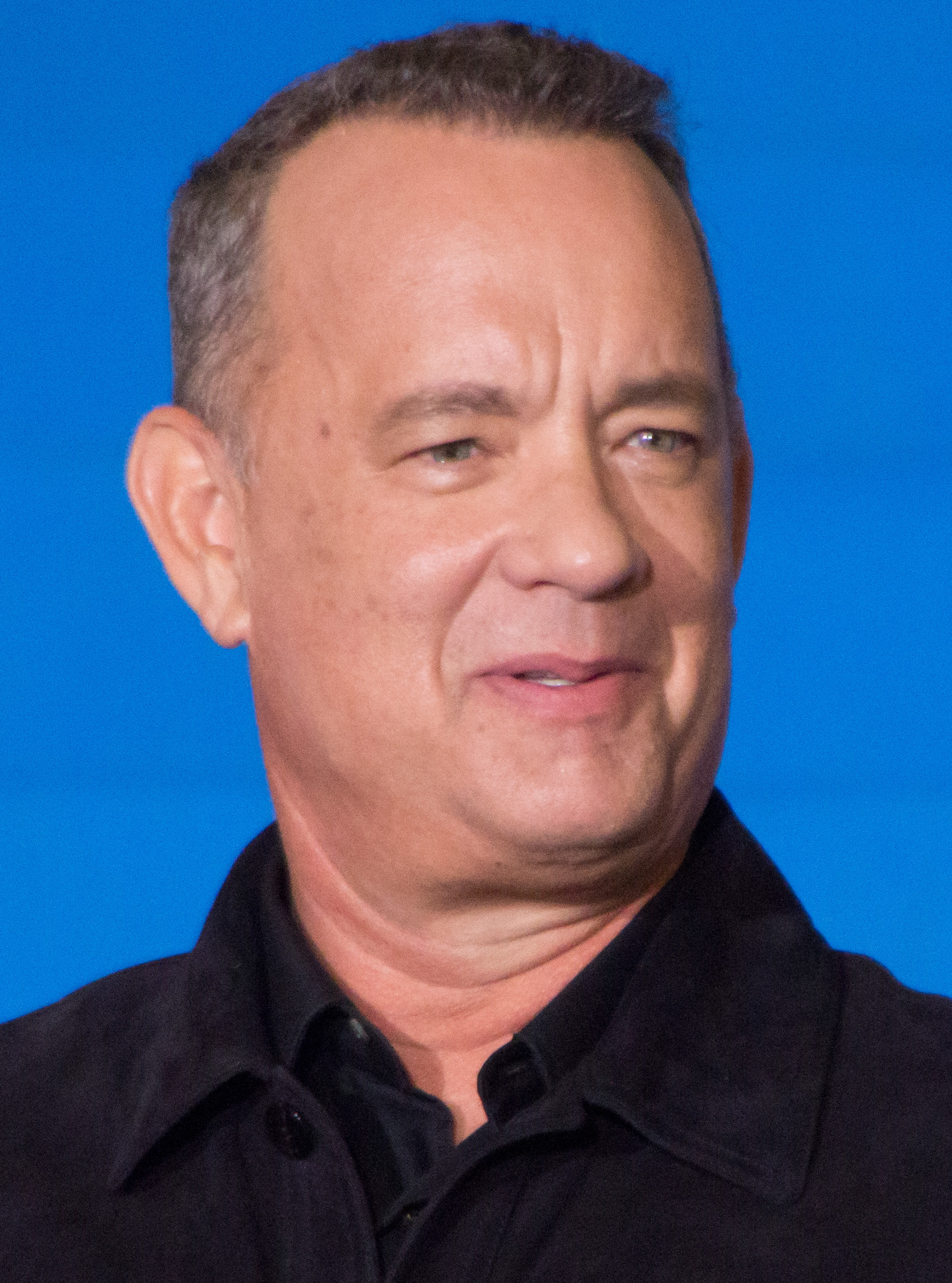
Tom Hanks, Best Actor winner

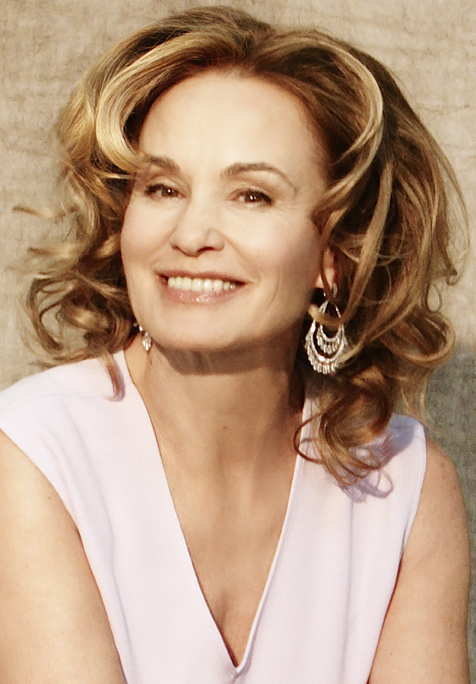
Jessica Lange, Best Actress winner

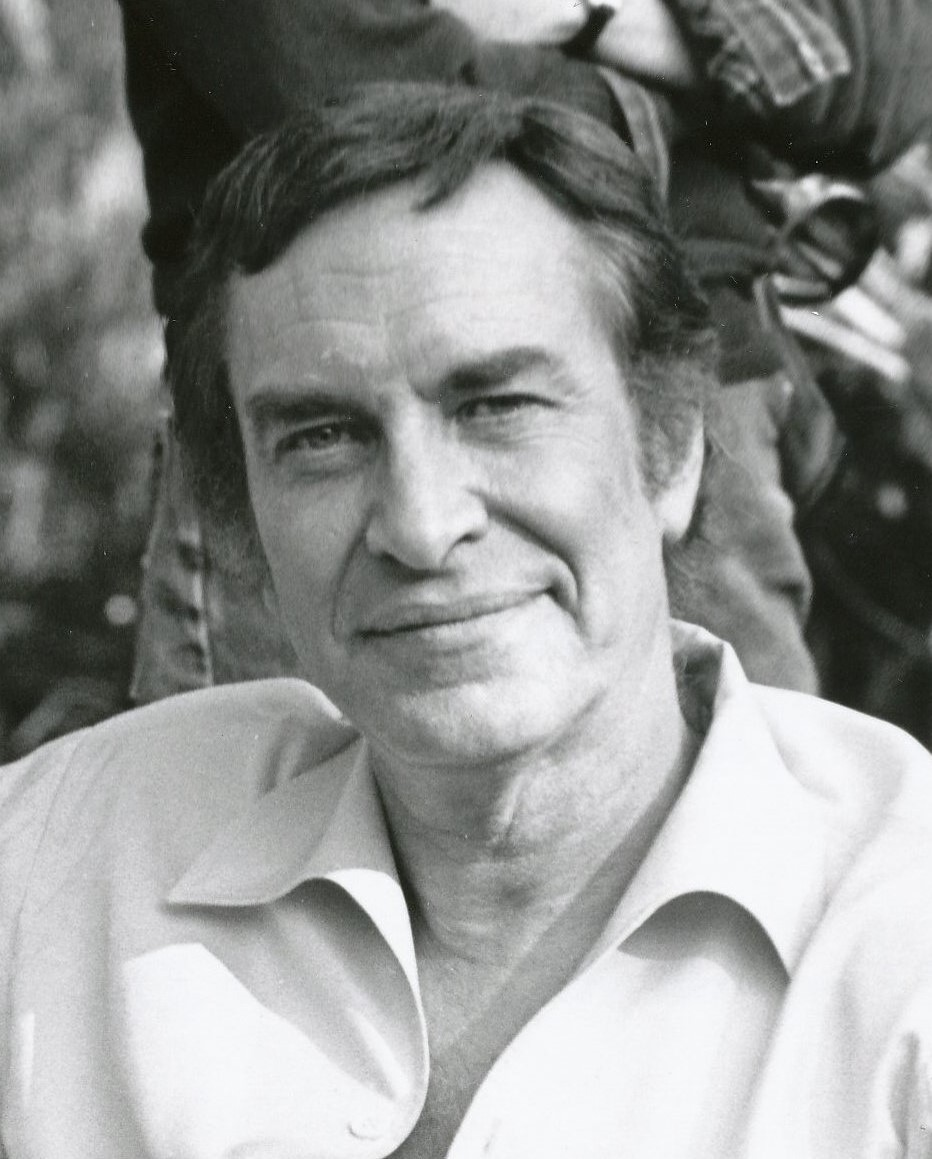
Martin Landau, Best Supporting Actor winner

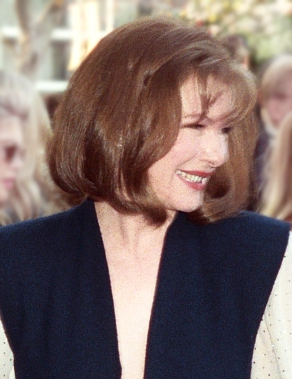
Dianne Wiest, Best Supporting Actress winner

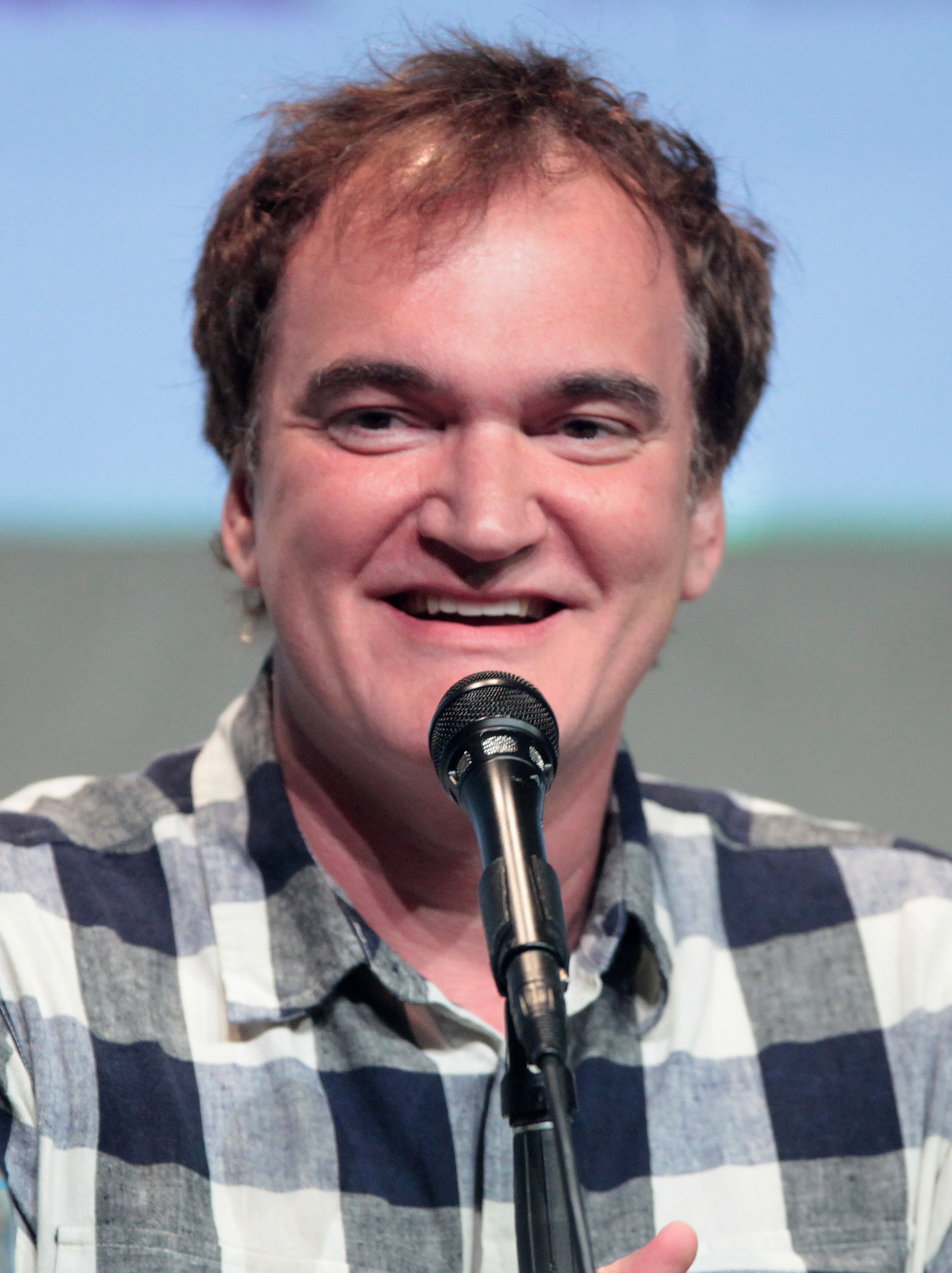
Quentin Tarantino, Best Original Screenplay co-winner

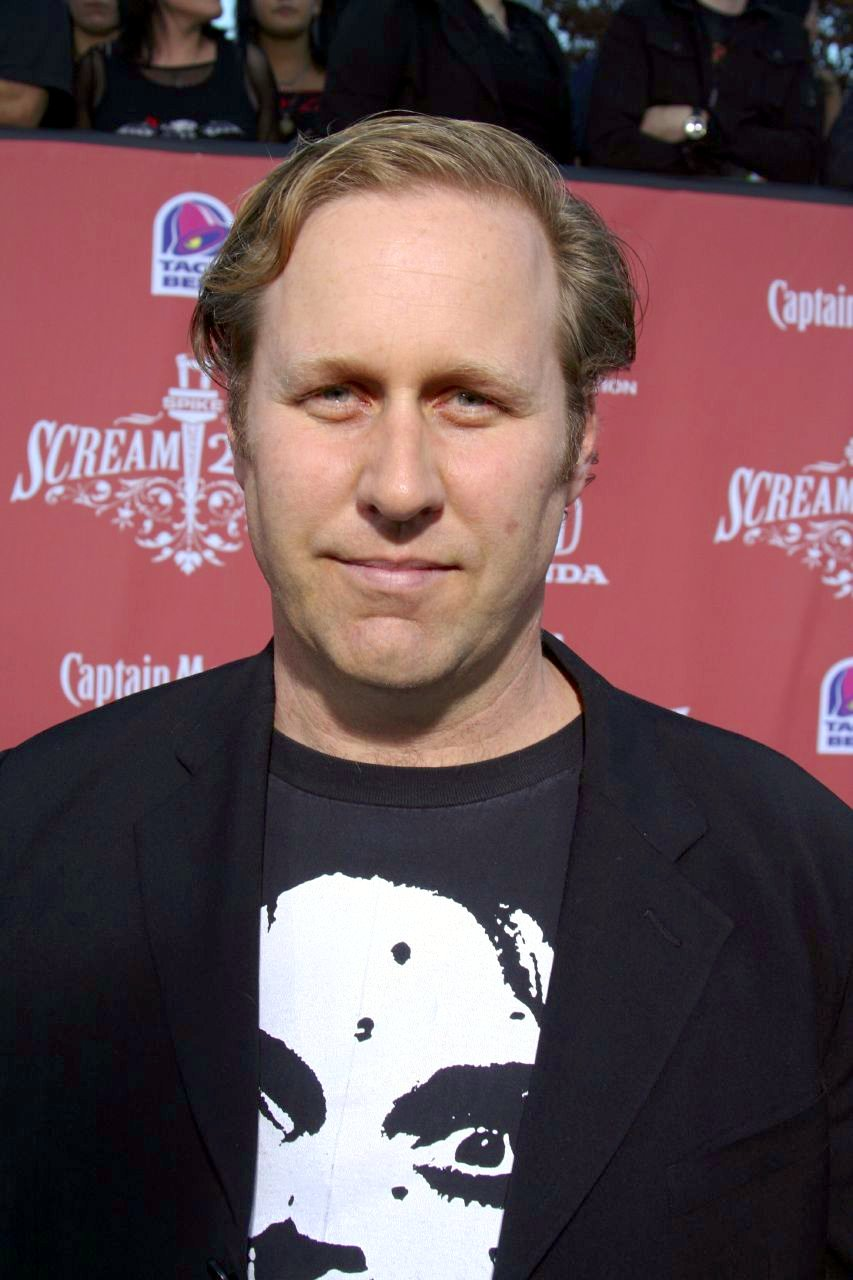
Roger Avary, Best Original Screenplay co-winner

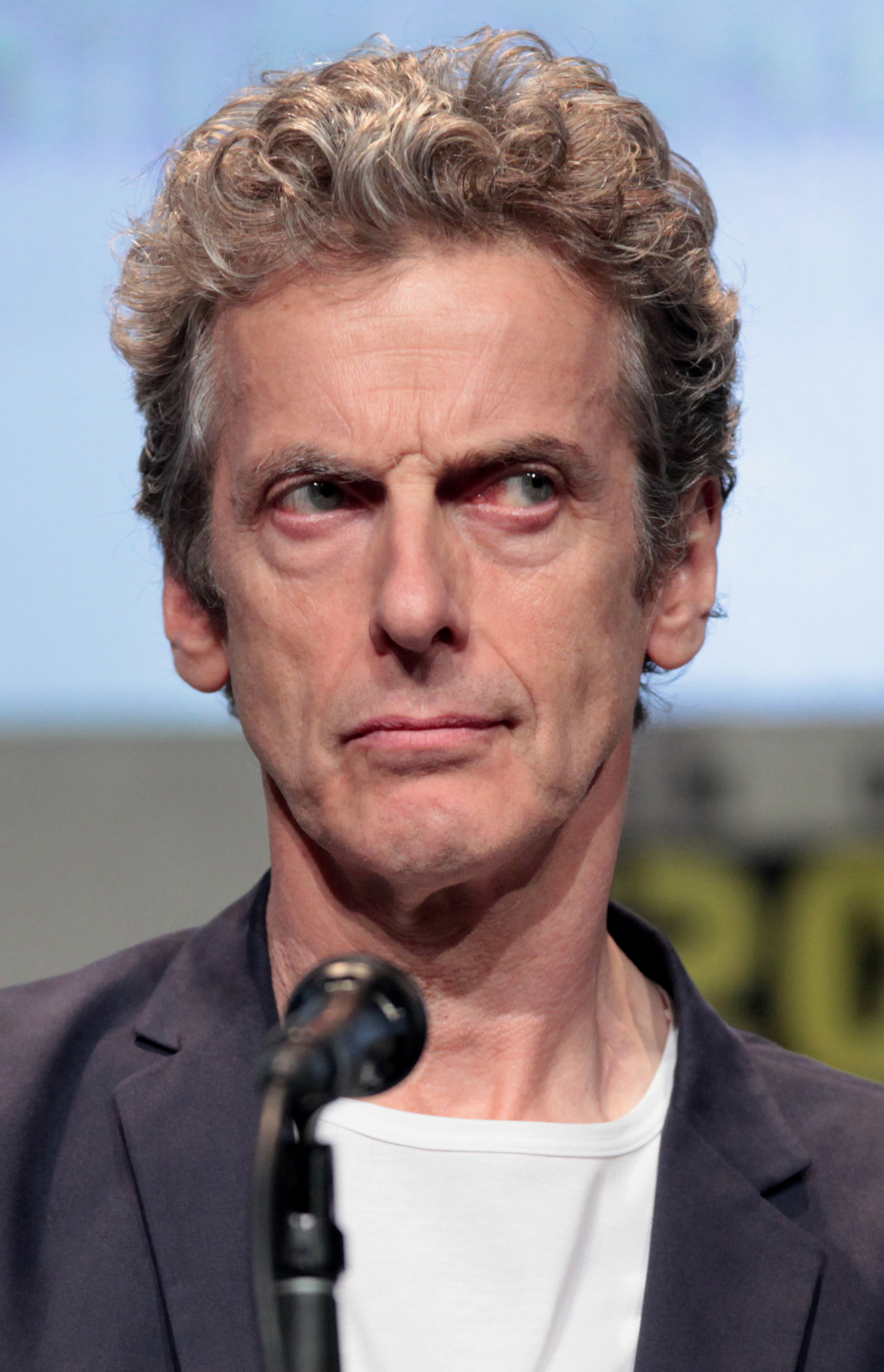
Peter Capaldi, Best Live Action Short Film co-winner

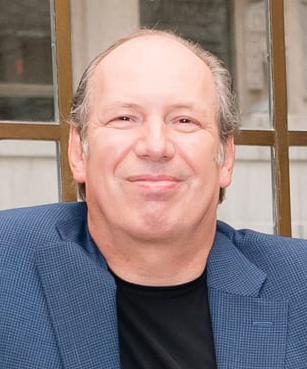
Hans Zimmer, Best Original Score winner

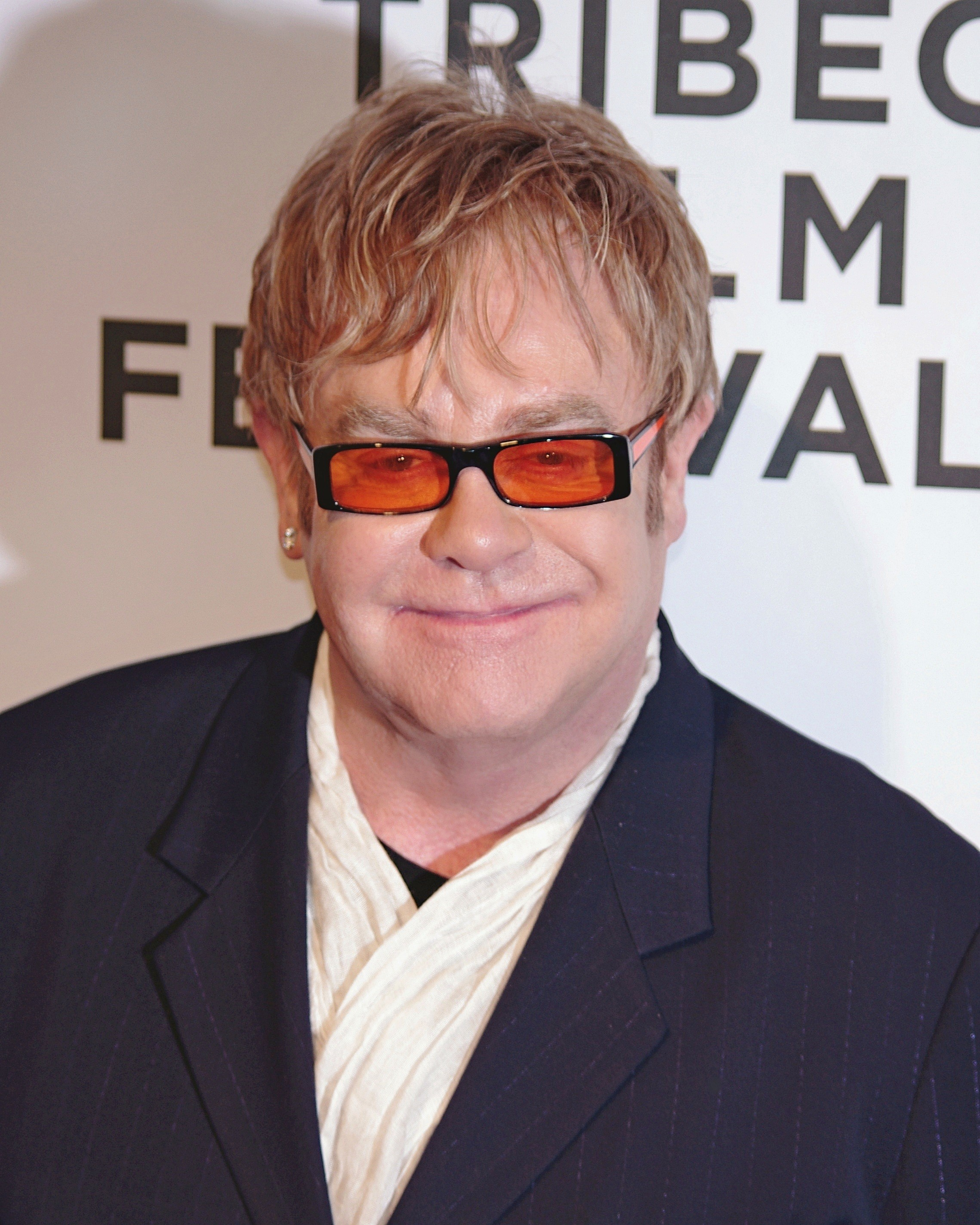
Elton John, Best Original Song co-winner

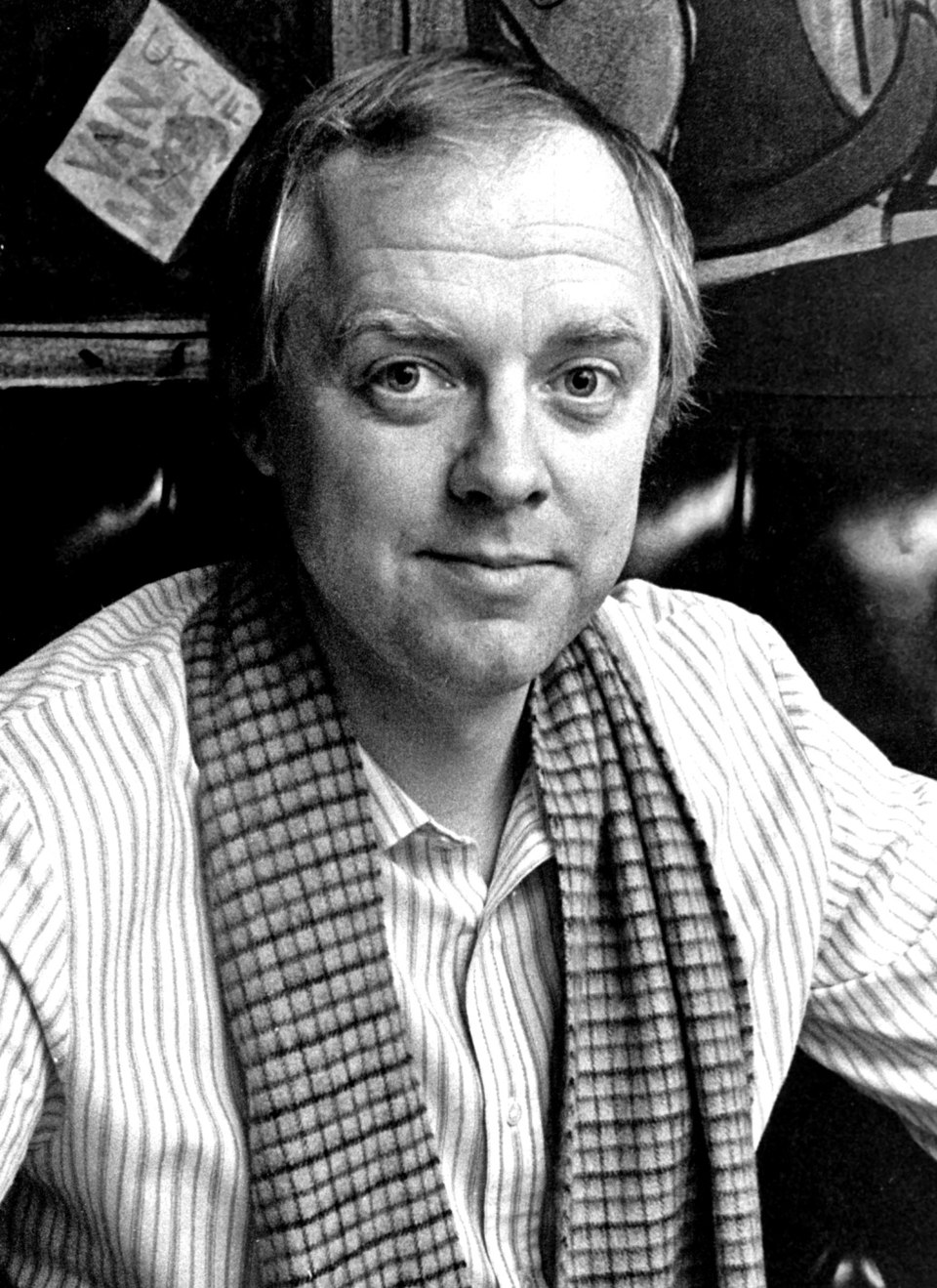
Tim Rice, Best Original Song co-winner

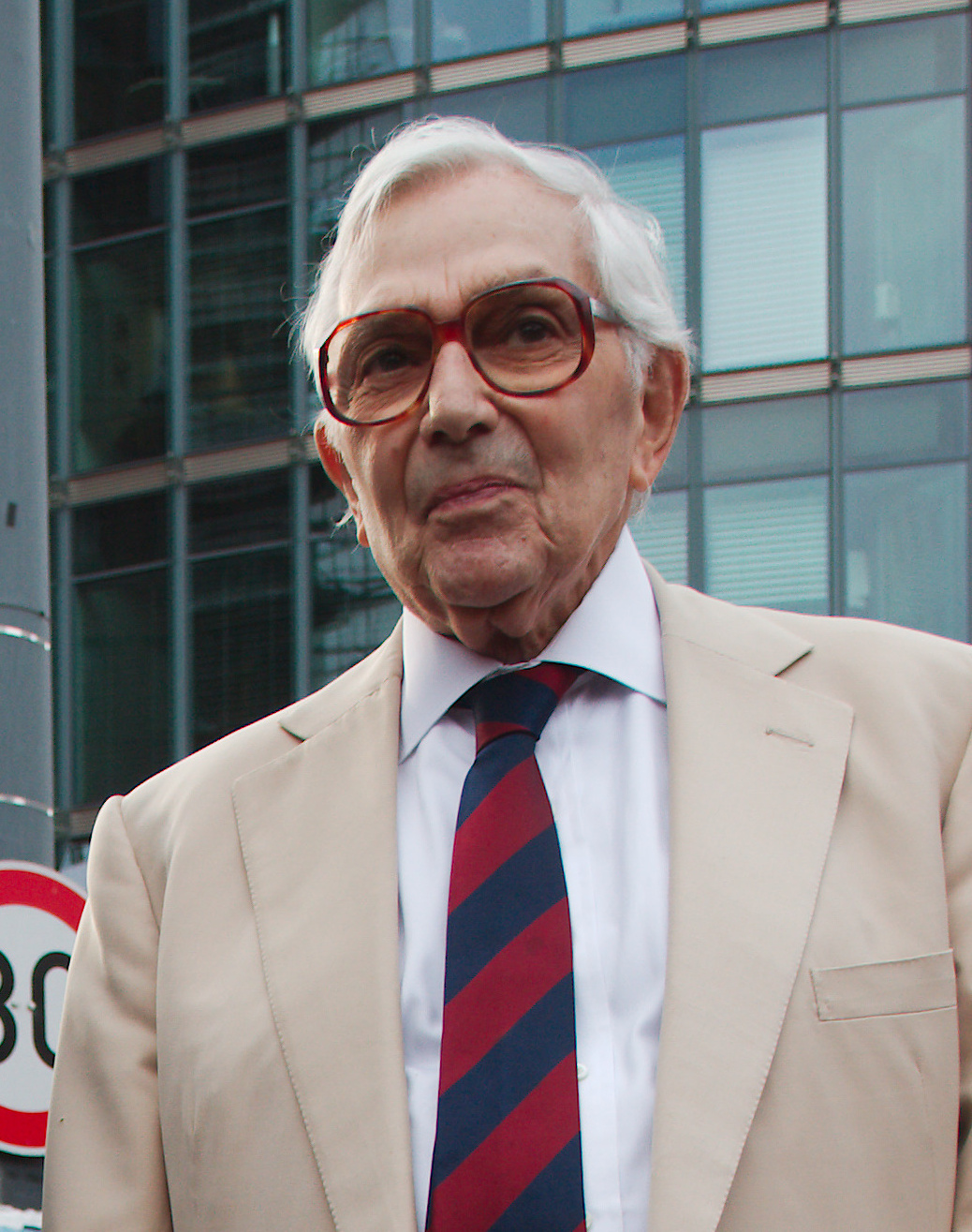
Ken Adam, Best Art Direction co-winner

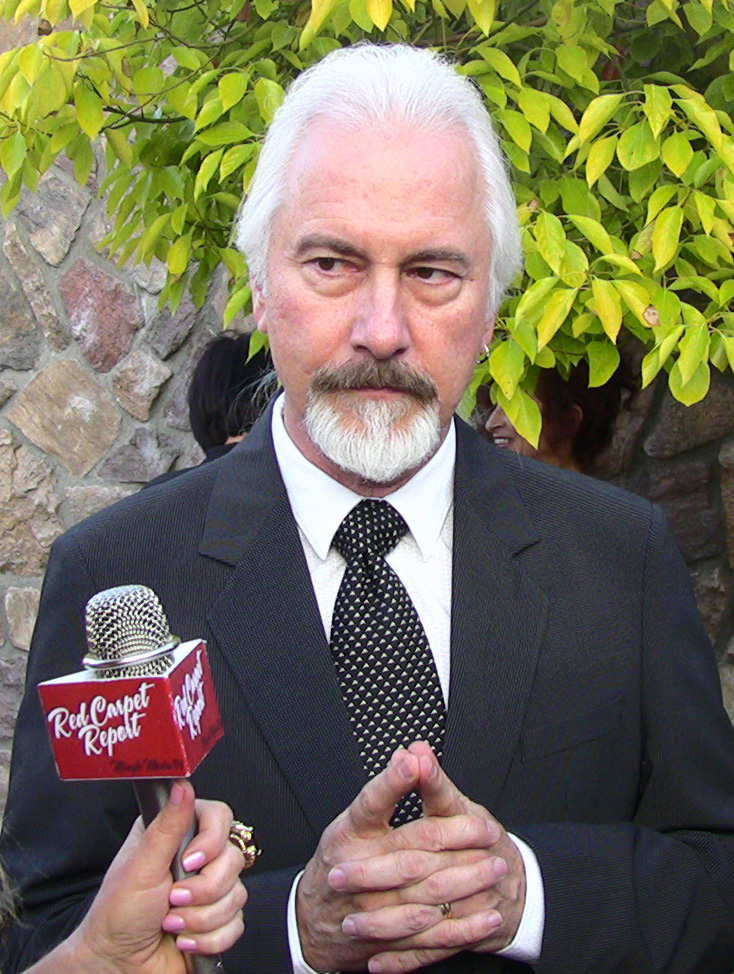
Rick Baker, Best Makeup co-winner

Winners are listed first, highlighted in boldface, and indicated with a double dagger (‡).

| **Best Picture**: **Forrest Gump – Wendy Finerman, Steve Tisch and Steve Starkey, producers**‡; Four Weddings and a Funeral – Duncan Kenworthy, producer; Pulp Fiction – Lawrence Bender, producer; Quiz Show – Robert Redford, Michael Jacobs, Julian Krainin, and Michael Nozik, producers; The Shawshank Redemption – Niki Marvin, producer | **Best Directing**: **Robert Zemeckis – Forrest Gump**‡; Woody Allen – Bullets Over Broadway; Quentin Tarantino – Pulp Fiction; Robert Redford – Quiz Show; Krzysztof Kieślowski – Three Colours: Red |
| **Best Actor in a Leading Role**: **Tom Hanks – Forrest Gump as Forrest Gump**‡; Morgan Freeman – The Shawshank Redemption as Ellis Boyd "Red" Redding; Nigel Hawthorne – The Madness of King George as King George III; Paul Newman – Nobody's Fool as Donald "Sully" Sullivan; John Travolta – Pulp Fiction as Vincent Vega | **Best Actress in a Leading Role**: **Jessica Lange – Blue Sky as Carly Marshall**‡; Jodie Foster – Nell as Nell Kellty; Miranda Richardson – Tom & Viv as Vivienne Haigh-Wood; Winona Ryder – Little Women as Josephine "Jo" March; Susan Sarandon – The Client as Regina "Reggie" Love |
| **Best Actor in a Supporting Role**: **Martin Landau – Ed Wood as Bela Lugosi**‡; Samuel L. Jackson – Pulp Fiction as Jules Winnfield; Chazz Palminteri – Bullets Over Broadway as Cheech; Paul Scofield – Quiz Show as Mark Van Doren; Gary Sinise – Forrest Gump as Lt. Dan Taylor | **Best Actress in a Supporting Role**: **Dianne Wiest – Bullets Over Broadway as Helen Sinclair**‡; Rosemary Harris – Tom & Viv as Rose Robinson Haigh-Wood; Helen Mirren – The Madness of King George as Queen Charlotte; Uma Thurman – Pulp Fiction as Mia Wallace; Jennifer Tilly – Bullets Over Broadway as Olive Neal |
| **Best Writing (Screenplay Written Directly for the Screen)**: **Pulp Fiction – Screenplay by Quentin Tarantino; Stories by Quentin Tarantino and Roger Avary**‡; Bullets Over Broadway – Woody Allen and Douglas McGrath; Four Weddings and a Funeral – Richard Curtis; Heavenly Creatures – Peter Jackson and Frances Walsh; Three Colours: Red – Krzysztof Kieślowski and Krzysztof Piesiewicz | **Best Writing (Screenplay Based on Material Previously Produced or Published)**: **Forrest Gump – Eric Roth based on the novel by Winston Groom**‡; The Madness of King George – Alan Bennett based on his stage play The Madness of George III; Nobody's Fool – Robert Benton based on the novel by Richard Russo; Quiz Show – Paul Attanasio based on the book Remembering America: A Voice from the Sixties by Richard N. Goodwin; The Shawshank Redemption – Frank Darabont based on the short novel "Rita Hayworth and Shawshank Redemption" by Stephen King |
| **Best Foreign Language Film**: **Burnt by the Sun (Russia) in Russian – Nikita Mikhalkov, director**‡; Before the Rain (FYR Macedonia) in Macedonian, Albanian, and English – Milcho Manchevski, director; Eat Drink Man Woman (Taiwan) in Mandarin Chinese – Ang Lee, director; Farinelli: Il Castrato (Belgium) in French and Italian – Gérard Corbiau, director; Strawberry and Chocolate (Cuba) in Spanish – Tomás Gutiérrez Alea and Juan Carlos Tabío, directors | **Best Documentary (Feature)**: **Maya Lin: A Strong Clear Vision – Freida Lee Mock and Terry Sanders**‡; Complaints of a Dutiful Daughter – Deborah Hoffmann; D-Day Remembered – Charles Guggenheim; Freedom on My Mind – Connie Field and Marilyn Mulford; A Great Day in Harlem – Jean Bach |
| **Best Documentary (Short Subject)**: **A Time for Justice – Charles Guggenheim**‡; 89mm from Europe – Marcel Łoziński; Blues Highway – Vince DiPersio and Bill Guttentag; School of the Americas Assassins – Robert Richter; Straight from the Heart – Dee Mosbacher and Frances Reid | **Best Short Film (Live Action)**: **Franz Kafka's It's a Wonderful Life – Peter Capaldi and Ruth Kenley-Letts**‡; **Trevor – Peggy Rajski and Randy Stone**‡; Kangaroo Court – Sean Astin and Christine Astin; On Hope – JoBeth Williams and Michele McGuire; Syrup – Paul Unwin and Nick Vivian |
| **Best Short Film (Animated)**: **Bob's Birthday – Alison Snowden and David Fine**‡; The Big Story – Tim Watts and David Stoten; The Janitor – Vanessa Schwartz; The Monk and the Fish – Michaël Dudok de Wit; Triangle – Erica Russell | **Best Music (Original Score)**: **The Lion King – Hans Zimmer**‡; Forrest Gump – Alan Silvestri; Interview with the Vampire – Elliot Goldenthal; Little Women – Thomas Newman; The Shawshank Redemption – Thomas Newman |
| **Best Music (Original Song)**: **"Can You Feel the Love Tonight" from The Lion King – Music by Elton John; Lyrics by Tim Rice**‡; "Circle of Life" from The Lion King – Music by Elton John; Lyrics by Tim Rice; "Hakuna Matata" from The Lion King – Music by Elton John; Lyrics by Tim Rice; "Look What Love Has Done" from Junior – Music and Lyrics by Carole Bayer Sager, James Newton Howard, James Ingram and Patty Smyth; "Make Up Your Mind" from The Paper – Music and Lyrics by Randy Newman | **Best Sound**: **Speed – Gregg Landaker, Steve Maslow, Bob Beemer and David MacMillan**‡; Clear and Present Danger – Donald O. Mitchell, Michael Herbick, Frank A. Montaño and Art Rochester; Forrest Gump – Randy Thom, Tom Johnson, Dennis S. Sands and William B. Kaplan; Legends of the Fall – Paul Massey, David E. Campbell, Chris David and Douglas Ganton; The Shawshank Redemption – Robert J. Litt, Elliot Tyson, Michael Herbick and Willie D. Burton |
| **Best Sound Effects Editing**: **Speed – Stephen Hunter Flick**‡; Clear and Present Danger – Bruce Stambler and John Leveque; Forrest Gump – Randy Thom and Gloria S. Borders | **Best Art Direction**: **The Madness of King George – Art Direction: Ken Adam; Set Decoration: Carolyn Scott**‡; Bullets Over Broadway – Art Direction: Santo Loquasto; Set Decoration: Susan Bode; Forrest Gump – Art Direction: Rick Carter; Set Decoration: Nancy Haigh; Interview with the Vampire – Art Direction: Dante Ferretti; Set Decoration: Francesca Lo Schiavo; Legends of the Fall – Art Direction: Lilly Kilvert; Set Decoration: Dorree Cooper |
| **Best Cinematography**: **Legends of the Fall – John Toll**‡; Forrest Gump – Don Burgess; The Shawshank Redemption – Roger Deakins; Three Colours: Red – Piotr Sobociński; Wyatt Earp – Owen Roizman | **Best Makeup**: **Ed Wood – Ve Neill, Rick Baker and Yolanda Toussieng**‡; Forrest Gump – Daniel C. Striepeke, Hallie D'Amore and Judith A. Cory; Mary Shelley's Frankenstein – Daniel Parker, Paul Engelen and Carol Hemming |
| **Best Costume Design**: **The Adventures of Priscilla, Queen of the Desert – Lizzy Gardiner and Tim Chappel**‡; Bullets Over Broadway – Jeffrey Kurland; Little Women – Colleen Atwood; Maverick – April Ferry; Queen Margot – Moidele Bickel | **Best Film Editing**: **Forrest Gump – Arthur Schmidt**‡; Hoop Dreams – Frederick Marx, Steve James and Bill Haugse; Pulp Fiction – Sally Menke; The Shawshank Redemption – Richard Francis-Bruce; Speed – John Wright |
**Best Visual Effects**: **Forrest Gump – Ken Ralston, George Murphy, Stephen Rosenbaum and Allen Hall**‡; The Mask – Scott Squires, Steve Spaz Williams, Tom Bertino and Jon Farhat; True Lies – John Bruno, Thomas L. Fisher, Jacques Stroweis and Patrick McClung

=== Honorary Award ===
- To Michelangelo Antonioni in recognition of his place as one of the cinema's master visual stylists.

=== Jean Hersholt Humanitarian Award ===
- Quincy Jones

=== Irving G. Thalberg Memorial Award ===
- Clint Eastwood

=== Multiple nominations and awards ===
The following 17 films received multiple nominations:

Filks that got multiple nominations
| Nominations | Film |
|---|---|
| 13 | Forrest Gump |
| 7 | Bullets Over Broadway |
| 7 | Pulp Fiction |
| 7 | The Shawshank Redemption |
| 4 | The Lion King |
| 4 | The Madness of King George |
| 4 | Quiz Show |
| 3 | Legends of the Fall |
| 3 | Little Women |
| 3 | Speed |
| 3 | Three Colours: Red |
| 2 | Clear and Present Danger |
| 2 | Ed Wood |
| 2 | Four Weddings and a Funeral |
| 2 | Interview with the Vampire |
| 2 | Nobody's Fool |
| 2 | Tom & Viv |

The following four films received multiple awards:

Films that got multiple awards
| Awards | Film |
|---|---|
| 6 | Forrest Gump |
| 2 | Ed Wood |
| 2 | The Lion King |
| 2 | Speed |

== Presenters and performers ==
The following individuals, in order of appearance, presented awards or performed musical numbers.

=== Presenters ===
Presenters at the Awards ceremony
| Name(s) | Role |
|---|---|
| Randy Thomas | Announcer for the 67th annual Academy Awards |
| Arthur Hiller (AMPAS President) | Gave opening remarks welcoming guests to the awards ceremony |
| Tommy Lee Jones | Presenter of the award for Best Supporting Actress |
| Sharon Stone | Presenter of the award for Best Costume Design |
| Keanu Reeves | Presenter of the film Pulp Fiction on the Best Picture segment |
| Rene Russo | Introducer of the performance of Best Original Song nominee "Make Up Your Mind" |
| Uma Thurman | Presenter of the award for Best Makeup |
| Sarah Jessica Parker | Presenter of the award for Best Sound Effects Editing |
| Steve Martin | Presenter of the award for Best Film Editing |
| Sally Field | Presenter of the film Forrest Gump on the Best Picture segment |
| Anna Paquin | Presenter of the award for Best Supporting Actor |
| Matt Dillon | Introducer of the performance of Best Original Song nominee "Look What Love Has Done" |
| Oprah Winfrey | Presenter of the Jean Hersholt Humanitarian Award to Quincy Jones |
| Paul Newman | Presenter of the award for Best Cinematography |
| Jamie Lee Curtis | Presenter of the segment of the Academy Awards for Technical Achievement and the Gordon E. Sawyer Award |
| Tim Allen | Presenter of the award for Best Live Action Short Film |
| Bugs Bunny (Greg Burson); Daffy Duck (Joe Alaskey) | Presenters of the award for Best Animated Short Film |
| Gregory Peck | Presenter of the film Quiz Show on the Best Picture segment |
| Tim Robbins; Susan Sarandon | Presenters of the award for Best Art Direction |
| Steven Seagal | Presenter of the award for Best Visual Effects |
| Angela Bassett | Introducer of the performance of the Best Original Song nominees "Circle of Life" and "Hakuna Matata" |
| Samuel L. Jackson; John Travolta | Presenters of the awards for Best Documentary Short Subject and Best Documentary Feature |
| Ellen Barkin | Presenter of the award for Best Sound |
| Jack Nicholson | Presenter of the Honorary Academy Award to Michelangelo Antonioni |
| Hugh Grant; Andie MacDowell | Presenters of the award for Best Original Score |
| Jeremy Irons | Presenter of the award for Best Foreign Language Film |
| Julia Ormond | Introducer of the performance of Best Original Song nominee "Can You Feel the Love Tonight" |
| Sylvester Stallone | Presenter of the award for Best Original Song |
| Annette Bening | Presenter of the film Four Weddings and a Funeral on the Best Picture segment |
| Anthony Hopkins | Presenter of the awards for Best Screenplay Written Directly for the Screen and Best Screenplay Based on Material Previously Produced or Published |
| Sigourney Weaver | Presenter of the In Memoriam tribute |
| Arnold Schwarzenegger | Presenter of the Irving G. Thalberg Memorial Award to Clint Eastwood |
| Tom Hanks | Presenter of the award for Best Actress |
| Denzel Washington | Presenter of the film The Shawshank Redemption on the Best Picture segment |
| Holly Hunter | Presenter of the award for Best Actor |
| Steven Spielberg | Presenter of the award for Best Director |
| Robert De Niro; Al Pacino | Presenters of the award for Best Picture |

=== Performers ===
Performers at the awards ceremony
| Name(s) | Role | Performed |
|---|---|---|
| Bill Conti | Musical arranger and conductor | Orchestral |
| Tim Curry; Kathy Najimy; Mara Wilson | Performers | "Make 'Em Laugh" from Singin' in the Rain during the opening number |
| Randy Newman | Performer | "Make Up Your Mind" from The Paper |
| Patty Smyth | Performer | "Look What Love Has Done" from Junior |
| Hinton Battle; Lebo M | Performers | "Circle of Life" from The Lion King |
| David Alan Grier; Ernie Sabella | Performers | "Hakuna Matata" from The Lion King |
| Elton John | Performer | "Can You Feel the Love Tonight" from The Lion King |

== Ceremony information ==
Despite earning critical praise for the previous year's ceremony, actress and comedian Whoopi Goldberg announced that she would not host the ceremony for a second consecutive year saying, "I've had a great time, but I've done it." She added that her role in the upcoming movie Bogus would jeopardize her busy schedule. In addition, her Comic Relief co-host and veteran Oscar emcee Billy Crystal declined to host the show citing his commitment to his film Forget Paris which he directed, wrote, starred in, and produced. Producer Gil Cates hired actor, comedian, and Late Show host David Letterman as host of the 1995 ceremony. Cates explained his decision to hire the late-night talk show host saying, "He's punctual, he's well groomed, and he knows how to keep an audience awake." ABC entertainment president Ted Harbert also approved of the choice stating, "If Dave likes the experience, this could be a great answer for the show, just the way Johnny Carson did the show for many years."

As with previous ceremonies he produced, Cates centered the show on a theme. This year, he christened the show with the theme "Comedy and the Movies" commenting "This year, because of the earthquakes and floods and Bosnia and Rwanda, it was a (terrible) year, and therefore seemed a great year to celebrate what movies can really give us, which is an opportunity to go for two hours in the dark and laugh together. Even with television, it's not a community experience unless you have a very big family. So it's unique to movies and theater, and it's this very human thing." In tandem with the theme, the ceremony's opening number featured a montage produced by Chuck Workman featuring scenes of humorous moments from a variety of both comedic and non-comedic films projected on a large screen on the stage. During that segment, actors Tim Curry, Kathy Najimy, and Mara Wilson performed a modified version of the song "Make 'Em Laugh" from the film Singin' in the Rain, using blue screen technology to make it appear that they were jumping in and out of the montage on the screen. Several collections of film clips were shown throughout the broadcast highlighting various aspects of comedy such as troupes and dialogue.

Several other people were also involved with the production of the ceremony. Bill Conti served as musical director and conductor for the event. Production designer Roy Christopher designed a new stage for the ceremony which prominently featured a proscenium which was designed to resemble the iris of a camera. Moreover, Christopher commented that the iris motif was inspired by the iris shot prominently featured in several comedic films and shorts. Dancer Debbie Allen choreographed The Lion King musical number. Actors Alec Baldwin, Jack Lemmon, Steve Martin, and Rosie O'Donnell participated in a pre-taped comedic sketch lampooning auditions for a role in Cabin Boy, the film in which Letterman made his film acting debut.

=== Box office performance of nominees ===
At the time of the nominations announcement on February 14, the combined gross of the five Best Picture nominees at the US box office was $468 million, with an average of $93.6 million per film. Forrest Gump was the highest earner among the Best Picture nominees with $300 million in domestic box office receipts. The film was followed by Pulp Fiction ($76 million), Four Weddings and a Funeral ($52 million), Quiz Show ($21 million) and The Shawshank Redemption ($16 million).

Of the top 50 grossing movies of the year, 44 nominations went to 14 films on the list. Only Forrest Gump (2nd), The Client (12th), Pulp Fiction (14th), Four Weddings and a Funeral (20th), and Nell (41st) were nominated for directing, acting, screenwriting, or Best Picture. The other top 50 box office hits that earned nominations were The Lion King (1st), True Lies (3rd), Clear and Present Danger (6th), Speed (7th), The Mask (8th), Interview with the Vampire (10th), Maverick (11th), Legends of the Fall (27th) and Little Women (31st).

=== Critical reception ===
The show received a negative reception from most media publications. John J. O'Connor of The New York Times wrote, "Instead of keeping things moving smartly, Mr. Letterman stuck with his late-night shtick, too often leaving the show's pacing in shambles." He also added, "Within the show's first half-hour, with no strong hand at the helm, the audience simply sagged. Applause died long before most winners even reached the podium." Television critic John Carman of the San Francisco Chronicle commented, "Last night on ABC, no one got it. Hollywood's big event was wonderfully littered by technical errors, bad taste, low comedy and lower necklines." Moreover, he remarked, "Letterman, the rookie host, was off his game in his opening monologue. Maybe it was the big auditorium. Or a billion people in the television audience." Film critic Andrew Sarris of The New York Observer quipped, "Not only was he not witty or funny, he never knew when to let bad enough alone." He concluded, "As the evening dragged on, it became obvious that Mr. Letterman had no gift for ad-libbing through the few unpredictable opportunities in a 'live' event like the Oscars."

Some media outlets received the broadcast more positively. Television critic Joyce Millman of The San Francisco Examiner noted, "In his first stint as host of the Oscar telecast, David Letterman did the impossible—he made something entertaining from what is traditionally the most boring three hours of TV this side of a test pattern." The Buffalo News columnist Alan Pergament praised Letterman's performance as host writing "David Letterman was a box full of chocolates on an Oscar night that was empty of much emotion until the expected Forrest Gump sweep in the final 15 minutes." He also added that despite a lack of surprises amongst the awards, the emotional and unexpected humorous moments provided depth and entertainment throughout the evening. Hal Boedeker of the Orlando Sentinel gave an average review of the ceremony but singled out Letterman noting that he "proved Monday night that he's among Oscar's Top 10 Hosts. He's definitely at the top of the list with Johnny Carson, Billy Crystal and Bob Hope."

=== Ratings and reception ===
The American telecast on ABC drew an average of 48.28 million people over its length, which was a 7% increase from the previous year's ceremony. An estimated 81 million total viewers watched all or part of the awards. The show also drew higher Nielsen ratings compared to the previous ceremony with 32.5% of households watching over a 53 share. It also drew a higher 18–49 demographic rating with a 21.7 rating among viewers in that demographic. It was the most watched Oscars telecast since the 55th ceremony held in 1983.

In July 1995, the ceremony presentation received six nominations at the 47th Primetime Emmys. Two months later, the ceremony won one of those nominations for Jeff Margolis's direction of the telecast.

== "In Memoriam" ==
The annual "In Memoriam" tribute, presented by actress Sigourney Weaver, honored the following people:

- Fernando Rey
- Cameron Mitchell
- Barry Sullivan
- Giulietta Masina
- Peter Cushing
- Frank Wells – Executive
- Noah Beery Jr.
- Woody Strode
- Jessica Tandy
- Tom Ewell
- Lionel Stander
- Jule Styne – Composer
- Walter Lantz – Animator
- Arthur Krim – Executive
- Ferdinando Scarfiotti – Art Director
- Robert Bolt – Screenwriter
- Donald Pleasence
- Harry Saltzman – Producer
- Terence Young – Director
- Burt Lancaster
- Henry Mancini – Composer
- Martha Raye
- George Peppard
- Gilbert Roland
- Rossano Brazzi
- Cabell 'Cab' Calloway
- Mildred Natwick
- Macdonald Carey
- David Wayne
- Raul Julia

== See also ==
- 1st Screen Actors Guild Awards
- 15th Golden Raspberry Awards
- 37th Grammy Awards
- 47th Primetime Emmy Awards
- 48th British Academy Film Awards
- 49th Tony Awards
- 52nd Golden Globe Awards
- American Express Gold card dress of Lizzy Gardiner
- List of submissions to the 67th Academy Awards for Best Foreign Language Film

== Bibliography ==
- Osborne, Robert (2013). 85 Years of the Oscar: The Complete History of the Academy Awards. New York, United States: Abbeville Publishing Group. ISBN 978-0-7892-1142-2.
- Pond, Steve (2005). The Big Show: High Times and Dirty Dealings Backstage at the Academy Awards. New York, United States: Faber and Faber. ISBN 0-571-21193-3.
- Wiley, Mason; Bona, Damien (1996). Inside Oscar: The Unofficial History of the Academy Awards (5 ed.). New York, United States: Ballantine Books. ISBN 0-345-40053-4. OCLC 779680732.
