= Home for the Holidays (1995 film) =

1995 film by Jodie Foster

- Theatrical release poster
- Directed by: Jodie Foster
- Screenplay by: W. D. Richter
- Based on: Home for the Holidays by Chris Radant
- Produced by: Jodie Foster; Peggy Rajski
- Starring: Holly Hunter; Robert Downey Jr.; Anne Bancroft; Dylan McDermott; Geraldine Chaplin; Steve Guttenberg; Claire Danes; Cynthia Stevenson; Charles Durning
- Cinematography: Lajos Koltai
- Edited by: Lynzee Klingman
- Music by: Mark Isham
- Production company: Egg Pictures
- Distributed by: Paramount Pictures (U.S. and Canadian theatrical and South America); PolyGram Filmed Entertainment (International)
- Release date: November 3, 1995
- Running time: 103 minutes
- Country: United States
- Language: English
- Budget: $20 million
- Box office: $22.1 million

Home for the Holidays is a 1995 American family comedy drama film directed by Jodie Foster and produced by Peggy Rajski and Foster. The screenplay was written by W. D. Richter, based on a short story by Chris Radant. The film's score was composed by Mark Isham. The film follows Claudia Larson, who after losing her job, kissing her ex-boss, and finding out that her daughter has plans of her own for the holidays, departs Chicago to spend her Thanksgiving with her dysfunctional family. The film takes its title from the song of the same name.

The film features an ensemble cast, including Holly Hunter, Robert Downey Jr., Anne Bancroft, Charles Durning, Dylan McDermott, Geraldine Chaplin, Steve Guttenberg, Cynthia Stevenson, Claire Danes, Austin Pendleton, and David Strathairn.

Home for the Holidays was released theatrically on November 3, 1995, by Paramount Pictures in North America and by PolyGram Filmed Entertainment worldwide. The film received mixed reviews from critics who appreciated Foster's direction, and Hunter's and Downey's performances but criticised the screenplay. The film grossed $22.1 million against a budget of $20 million.

== Plot ==
Claudia Larson is a single mother who has just been fired from her job. She flies from Chicago to spend Thanksgiving at the Baltimore home of her parents, Adele and Henry, while her only child decides to stay home and spend the holiday with her boyfriend. While on the plane, Claudia makes a phone call to Tommy, her younger brother and confidant, whom she believes will not be attending the Thanksgiving dinner, and unloads her problems on his answering machine.

Claudia arrives in Baltimore at her parents' home. That night, Tommy arrives with his business partner Leo Fish, whom Claudia believes to be his new boyfriend. Claudia is glad to see her brother but fears that he and Jack, his longtime boyfriend, have broken up. The next day while in town, Claudia runs into a girl she used to go to school with and feels diminished by talk of her divorce. Leo comes to her aid.

On Thanksgiving Day, eccentric Aunt Gladys (Adele's sister), who is showing signs of dementia, professes her love for Henry. Shortly after, Tommy accidentally drops the turkey all over his and Claudia's conservative sister Joanne, resulting in an argument in which she reveals to everyone that Tommy had married Jack in a beach wedding several months ago. To get away from the chaos, Tommy and Claudia eat their dinner in the kitchen.

After the meal, Tommy, Leo, Joanne's husband Walter and son Walter Jr. play football and, frustrated by the game, the brothers-in-law begin to fight. Walter wrestles Tommy onto the ground, and Tommy accidentally punches Leo, who is trying to break them up. Henry sprays them with the hose, and Walter leaves with his wife and children.

The family returns inside, where Henry answers the ringing phone; it turns out to be Jack calling. Before handing the phone over to Tommy, Henry says that he is happy for both of them. Their conversation reveals they are still happily together. Claudia and Leo drive Aunt Gladys home, then deliver leftovers to Joanne's family. Claudia and Joanne get into a heated argument, until Joanne demands that Claudia leave her alone. In the car, Leo tells Claudia that Tommy showed him a picture of her, and he came to Thanksgiving to meet her. They kiss.

Arriving back at Claudia's parents’ home, Leo and Claudia begin to make out in the living room, but Tommy reminds Leo that they have to get an early start in the morning. The next day, Claudia wakes up and sees Tommy and Leo driving away and heads to the airport herself shortly after. Before the plane takes off, Leo gets into the seat next to her, and they fly back to Chicago together.

== Cast ==
- Holly Hunter as Claudia Larson
- Robert Downey Jr. as Tommy Larson
- Anne Bancroft as Adele Larson
- Dylan McDermott as Leo Fish
- Geraldine Chaplin as Aunt Gladys
- Steve Guttenberg as Walter Wedman
- Claire Danes as Kitt Larson
- Cynthia Stevenson as Joanne Larson Wedman
- Charles Durning as Henry Larson
- Austin Pendleton as Peter Arnold
- Amy Yasbeck as Ginny Johnson Drewer
- Emily Ann Lloyd as Brittany Lace Wedman
- Zach Duhame as Walter Wedman, Jr.
- David Strathairn as Russell Terziak
- James Lecesne (Note: Celeste Lecesne, credited at the time as James Lecesne.) as Ron Drewer
- Angela Paton as Woman on Airplane
- Randy Stone as Man in Car
- Sam Slovick as Jack
- Shawn Hatosy as Counter Boy

== Production ==
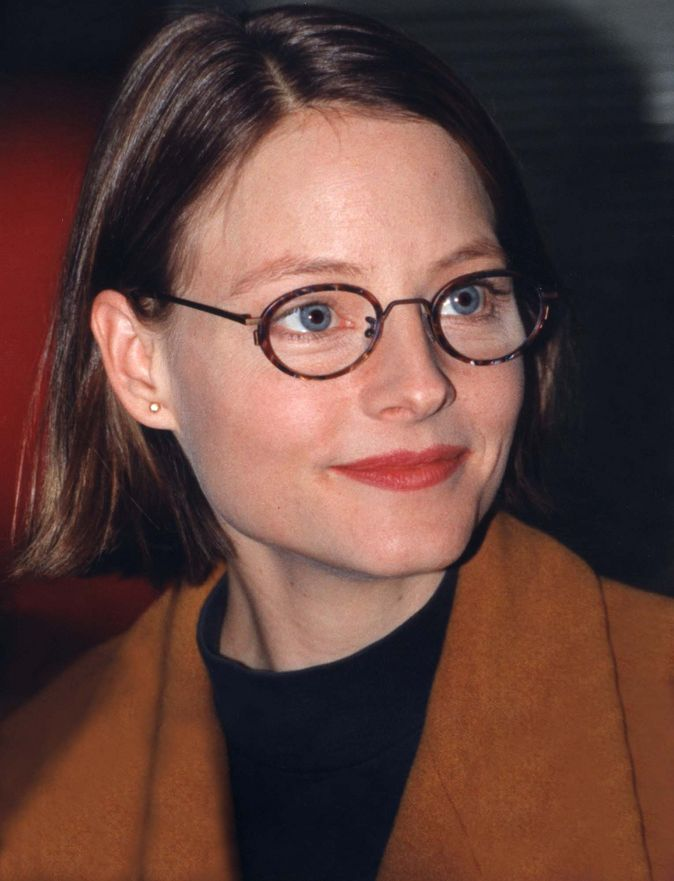
Foster during the filming

Screenwriter W. D. Richter adapted a short story by Chris Radant that appeared in the Boston Phoenix. Executive producer Stuart Kleinman sent Jodie Foster the screenplay with a note that said, "It's a complete mess and I love it." Foster agreed and decided that it would be her second directorial effort (the first was Little Man Tate). Castle Rock Entertainment was originally going to finance the film but canceled. Foster's own production company, Egg Pictures, acquired Richter's screenplay. She struck a deal with Paramount Pictures and PolyGram Filmed Entertainment to handle distribution on the film: Paramount would distribute across all media in North and South America with the exception of North American home video and U.S. pay television, with PolyGram handling all other rights. Most of these rights now belong to Metro-Goldwyn-Mayer (MGM) through their acquisition of PolyGram's pre-1996 library.

Foster said, "The great challenge was to find a beautiful idea to pull through it, a narrative line that would make the story work." Foster met with Richter and together they brainstormed and "had great fun thinking up new details and lives and clearing up the relationships," Foster remembers. They worked on the script so that the film reflected Foster's point of view and her own life experiences. She showed the first draft to Holly Hunter, who agreed to star after reading it. Working with a $20 million budget, Foster spent ten weeks filming in Baltimore with a two-week rehearsal period. She used this time to get input from the actors about dialogue. If a scene of speech did not ring true, she wanted to know. She picked the city because it was the "prototype of the American city. It's dangerous, east coasty, urban. Yet it still has a hopeful quality to it." Principal photography began in February 1995. Filming of the Thanksgiving dinner took more than ten days, using 64 turkeys, 20 pounds of mashed potatoes, 35 pounds of stuffing, 44 pies, 30 pounds of sweet potatoes, 18 bags of mini-marshmallows and 50 gallons of juice that stood in for wine. Foster allowed Robert Downey Jr. to improvise, which got him excited about making films again after a period of time when he became disillusioned with acting.

== Soundtrack ==
Home for the Holidays (Original Motion Picture Soundtrack)

Soundtrack album by Various artists
- Released: 1995
- Genre: Soundtrack
- Length: 47:14
- Label: Mercury Records
- Producer: Mark Isham

Soundtrack
Review scores
Source	Rating
Allmusic	link

1. Rusted Root – "Evil Ways" 4:03
2. Mark Isham – "Holiday Blues" 4:46
3. Nat King Cole – "Candy" 3:51
4. Tom Jones – "It's Not Unusual" 2:01
5. Mark Isham – "Blue Nights" 9:25
6. Mark Isham – "Birth of the Cool Whip" 2:53
7. Dinah Washington – "Trouble in Mind" 2:50
8. Mark Isham – "Late Night Blues" 4:59
9. Mark Isham – "Medley of the Very Thought of You/With Us Alone" 2:42
10. Ray Noble – "The Very Thought of You" 4:25
11. Nat King Cole – "The Very Thought of You" 3:47
12. Janis Joplin – "Piece of My Heart" 4:14

== Reception ==
=== Box office ===
Home for the Holidays was released on November 3, 1995, in 1,000 theaters and grossed US$4 million in its opening weekend. It went on to make $17.5 million in North America. The film earned a further $4.7 million internationally for a worldwide total of $22.1 million.

=== Critical response ===
On Rotten Tomatoes Home for the Holidays has an approval rating of 64% based on reviews from 50 critics. The site's consensus states: "Much like a real-life visit Home for the Holidays, this Thanksgiving-set dramedy can get a little bumpy – but it also has its share of fondly memorable moments." On Metacritic the film has a score of 56 out of 100 based on reviews from 15 critics. Audiences surveyed by CinemaScore gave the film a grade C+ on scale of A to F.

In his three and half star review, Roger Ebert praised Foster's ability to direct "the film with a sure eye for the revealing little natural moment," and Downey's performance that "brings out all the complexities of a character who has used a quick wit to keep the world's hurts at arm's length." Janet Maslin, in her review for The New York Times, praised Holly Hunter's performance: "Displaying a dizziness more mannered than the cool, crisp intelligence she shows in Copycat, Ms. Hunter still holds together Home for the Holidays with a sympathetic performance." In his review for the Boston Globe, Jay Carr praised the film for being "filled with juicy performances that expand resourcefully beyond what we think are going to be their boundaries, the film carries us beyond our expectations. That's what makes it so pleasurable."

USA Today gave the film three out of four stars and wrote, "Home has the usual hellish ritual. They come, they eat, they argue, they leave. It's the stuffing in-between that makes it special." However, in her review for The Washington Post, Rita Kempley criticized some of the performances: "Downey brings a lot of energy to the role, but his antics can be both tedious and distracting. Hunter has a lovely scene with her disgruntled sister, but there's no time for that relationship to develop, what with a romantic interest yet to explore." In his review for Rolling Stone magazine, Peter Travers had problems with the screenplay: "It's a shame that W.D. Richter's un-Disney-ish script often slides into shrill stereotypes and sitcom silliness."

The film has become something of a cult classic in recent years, with critic Emily St. James describing it as "a warm, messy comedy about how warm and messy family can be. It doesn’t really tell a story so much as chronicle a sequence of events, but it captures something ineffable about how going back home to squabble with relatives and eat lots of food can add a nostalgic glow to the chill of late November."
