= Peggy Rajski =

American filmmaker (born 1953)

- Born: August 20, 1953 (age 72); Stevens Point, Wisconsin, U.S.
- Occupation: Filmmaker
- Years active: 1983–present
- Notable work: The Trevor Project; Trevor (film); Matewan; Little Man Tate; The Grifters
- Spouse(s): Josh Mostel (m. 1983; div. 1998) Paul Colin (m. 2012)

Peggy M. Rajski (born August 20, 1953) is an American filmmaker, best known for directing and co-producing the 1994 American short film Trevor, which won an Academy Award for "Best Live Action Short Film" at the 67th Annual Academy Awards in 1995. She is a founder of The Trevor Project, a crisis-intervention and suicide prevention organization for LGBTQ+ youth.

Rajski taught producing and filmmaking at New York University's graduate film program and was dean of the Loyola Marymount University School of Film and Television in Los Angeles, California from 2018 to 2021.

From November 2022 until July 2024 she was interim CEO of The Trevor Project.

== Early life and education ==
Rajski was born and raised in Stevens Point, Wisconsin where she was one of ten siblings. Her father, Pat A. Rajski, was a U.S. Navy veteran who participated in Admiral Byrd's Antarctic Expedition and Operation Highjump. Following his discharge from the Navy, Pat Rajski joined Consolidated Papers Wisconsin River Division. Her mother, Patricia A. (Simon) Rajski, was a homemaker.

As a youngster, she was a member of the local Girl Scouts Troop and was a recipient of the Marian Award in 1966.

Rajski attended Maria High School, a local all-girls Catholic school which merged with Pacelli High School when she was a junior. In high school, she was a varsity cheerleader, color guard Sergeant and active on the student council. She was a photographer for, and later editor of, the school yearbook. She graduated in 1971.

Rajski received a bachelor's degree in 1975 from the University of Wisconsin–Stevens Point, and a master of fine arts degree from the University of Wisconsin–Madison in 1977.

== Career ==
Following college, Rajski moved to New York to pursue a career in the film industry. She initially worked as a receptionist at a firm that produced corporate films and moved into the role of producer/director within one year.

She began interfacing with people making low budget indie films and met writer/director John Sayles and producer Maggie Renzi at a friend's party in 1983. The couple were looking for a production manager for Sayles film next film project, Lianna and Rajski was offered the job.

In 1984, Rajski and Renzi co-produced Bruce Springsteen's video for Born in the USA, which was directed by Sayles. The pair went on to produce the music videos for Springsteen's I'm on Fire and Glory Days.

Rajski produced a number of Sayles's early films, including The Brother from Another Planet (1984), Matewan (1987), and Eight Men Out (1988).

She worked with other filmmakers to produce Little Man Tate (1991; directed by and starring Jodie Foster), The Grifters (1990; directed by Stephen Frears and co-produced with Martin Scorsese), and Home for the Holidays (1995; also in collaboration with Jodie Foster).

In 2003, Rajski directed an episode of the TV series, ER featuring Aaron Paul in a key supporting role.. She was the only new director introduced in the show's ninth season.

In 2018, Rajski was selected as a mentor for Film Independent’s Global Media Makers program, an initiative in partnership with the U.S. Department of State’s Bureau of Educational and Cultural Affairs. The program serves to create relationships between filmmakers and industry professionals in the U.S. and abroad.

In April 2019, Rajski was a speaker and panel moderator at Film Independent's 14th annual Film Independent Forum, and is a frequent guest lecturer and panelist at industry events in Los Angeles and elsewhere. Rajski is a member of the Director’s Guild of American (DGA), Film Independent, and the Academy of Motion Picture Arts & Sciences (AMPAS).

=== Trevor (film) ===
In 1994, Rajski directed the American short film Trevor and co-produced it with Randy Stone. Written by Celeste Lecesne and set in 1981, the film follows a 13-year-old boy named Trevor who struggles with his identity after his crush on a male schoolmate named Pinky Faraday is discovered. As rumors spread, and his classmates begin to turn on him, Trevors thoughts turn to suicide.

Trevor tied for the Oscar for Best Short Subject with Franz Kafka's It's a Wonderful Life at the 67th Academy Awards held on March 17, 1995. It also won the Teddy Award for Best Short at the Berlin International Film Festival in 1995. In 2017, the Writers Theatre in Chicago adapted the film into a live stage production called "Trevor the Musical." The production debuted off-Broadway in 2021 and a film of the musical aired on Disney+ in 2022.

=== The Trevor Project ===
In 1998, Rajski founded The Trevor Project to create a 24/7 crisis intervention and suicide prevention organization for lesbian, gay, bisexual, transgender and questioning youth, with Randy Stone and Celeste Lecesne.

When HBO confirmed they would be airing the film that year with Ellen DeGeneres hosting, Rajski searched for a service that provided round-the-clock support for queer and questioning young people so that young viewers who identified with the central character’s experience would have a place to turn for help. Discovering that no such resource existed, Rajski moved to establish a nationwide 24-hour crisis line for LGBTQ+ youth which became The Trevor Project. When the film premiered on HBO in August 1998, The Trevor Project’s crisis line phone number was posted on screen as the film’s end credits rolled, and counselors received more than 1500 calls that first night.

In 2012, the producers of Glee worked with The Trevor Project to address teen suicide in the episode, "On My Way." The organization arranged for a public service announcement to be included in the episode. The episode resulted in a spike in calls to the non-profit’s hotline, and record traffic to its website. Rajski stated that because the show "worked in conjunction" with The Trevor Project, the organization was prepared in advance to handle the increase in hotline traffic, which was "triple the [usual] number of calls." They also saw a nearly sevenfold increase to 10,000 website visitors on the evening the program aired.

Rajski has been an outspoken advocate and frequent speaker in support of crisis intervention and suicide prevention for LGBTQ+ youth. In 2022, she was the keynote speaker at student fundraiser held at the University of Missouri Kansas City Pride Breakfast. She has remained an active member of The Trevor Project’s Board of Directors since its founding in 1998 and was named interim CEO in 2022.

In 2024, the organization received outreach to its crisis services (phone, text and chat) from over 500,000+ contacts.

=== Academics ===
In 2010, Rajski was appointed associate professor at New York University Tisch School of the Arts Graduate Film Program and promoted to head of studies for the producing track in 2011. She also served as a member of the faculty committee for the NYU Cinema Research Institute. During this time, the University of Wisconsin–Stevens Point named Rajski a College of Fine Arts and Communication Distinguished Alumnus.

Rajski was named Dean of the Loyola Marymount University School of Film & Television in 2018. During her time at LMU, the school opened a 35,000 square foot production facility in the Playa Vista neighborhood of Los Angeles. In 2020, Rajski served as an external reviewer of UCLA's Department of Film, Television & Digital Media. She left LMU in 2021.

== Personal life ==
Rajski married actor Josh Mostel in 1983. The couple divorced in 1995. Rajski has been married to Paul Colin since 2012.

In 2024, Rajski joined NFL player Carl Nassib to announce the Cleveland Browns' second round draft pick during the annual nationally televised NFL event.

Rajski has referred to herself as the "Straight White Godmother of a Gay Suicidal Hotline".

Rajski's brother, Patrick Nash Rajski died by suicide at age 32 shortly before the film Trevor began production.

== Awards and honors ==
- Muse Award, New York Women in Film & Television, 1991
- Academy Award, Best Live Action Short Film, 1995
- Distinguished Alumnus, University of Wisconsin Stevens Point College of Fine Arts and Communications, 2014
- Pioneers of Queer Cinema, UCLA Film Archive, 2022 (the only non-LGBTQ-identified filmmaker to be honored)
- LGBTQ Power Players, Politics NY, 2023 and 2024.

== Filmography ==
Year	Title	Position
2015	Sweetheart Deal (documentary)	Executive producer; post-production
2013	Quad	Executive producer
2012	Grassroots	Producer
2009	Crossing Midnight (documentary short)	Producer
2008	One Bridge to the Next (documentary short)	Producer
2007	Towelhead	Executive producer
2005	Bee Season	Executive producer
2002	The Scoundrel's Wife	Producer
1997	Boys Life 2	Producer—segment "Trevor"
1995	Home for the Holidays	Producer
1994	Trevor (short)	Director, Producer
1992	Used People	Producer
1991	Little Man Tate	Producer
1990	The Grifters	Co-producer
1988	Eight Men Out	Co-producer
1987	Matewan	Producer
1984	The Brother from Another Planet	Producer
1983	Lianna	Production manager

== See also ==
- List of female film and television directors
- List of LGBT-related films directed by women
