= Chris David =

Chris David may refer to:

- Chris David (sound engineer) (born 1953), English sound engineer
- Chris David (footballer) (born 1993), Dutch footballer
- Chris David, American Navy veteran beaten by police in July 2020 during the George Floyd protests in Portland, Oregon
