= The Trevor Project =

American LGBTQ support service

- Founded: March 25, 1998; 28 years ago
- Founders: Celeste Lecesne; Peggy Rajski; Randy Stone
- Tax ID no.: 95-4681287
- Legal status: 501(c)(3) nonprofit organization
- Purpose: To end suicide among lesbian, gay, bisexual, transgender, queer and questioning young people
- Headquarters: West Hollywood, California, U.S.
- Coordinates: 34.08851°N 118.37876°W
- Method: Suicide prevention through its free and confidential lifeline, in-school workshops, educational materials, online resources, and advocacy.
- Chair: Julian Moore
- Chief executive officer, executive director: Jaymes Black
- Revenue: US$85,455,038 (2025)
- Expenses: US$67,416,524 (2025)
- Employees: 718 (2024)
- Volunteers: 905 (2025)
- Website: thetrevorproject.org
- Financial numbers for tax year from August 1, 2024, to July 31, 2025

The Trevor Project is an American nonprofit organization founded in 1998. Focused on suicide prevention efforts for lesbian, gay, bisexual, transgender, queer, and questioning (LGBTQ) youth, they offer a toll-free telephone number where confidential assistance is provided by trained counselors. The stated goals of the project are to provide crisis intervention and suicide prevention services for youth (defined by the organization as people under 25), as well as to offer guidance and resources to parents and educators in order to foster safe, accepting, and inclusive environments for all youth, at home, schools and colleges. The Trevor Project also operates the internet forum TrevorSpace.

== History ==
Then-senator Al Franken discussing LGBT suicide and the Trevor Project

The project was founded in 1998 in West Hollywood, California, by Celeste Lecesne, Peggy Rajski, and Randy Stone. They are the creators of the 1994 Academy Award–winning short film Trevor, a dramedy about Trevor, a gay thirteen-year-old boy who, when rejected by friends because of his sexuality, attempts suicide. When the film was scheduled to air on HBO television in 1998, the filmmakers realized that some of the program's young viewers might be facing the same kind of crisis as Trevor and began to search for a support line to be broadcast during the airing. They discovered that no such helpline existed and decided to dedicate themselves to forming the resource: an organization to promote acceptance of LGBTQ youth, and to aid in crisis and suicide prevention among that group.

The Trevor Lifeline was established with seed funds provided by The Colin Higgins Foundation and HBO's license fee. As a result, it became the first nationwide, around-the-clock crisis and suicide prevention helpline for LGBTQ youth. The project also provides online support to young people through the project's website, as well as guidance and resources to educators and parents.

In 2004, the organization released an educational kit for both educators and youth service providers which included a copy of the short film, a teaching guide (to be used with the film), cards with the hotline number, and posters.

2005 saw the release of "Dear Trevor", an online question and answer forum which allowed for people to anonymously ask and answer "non-urgent" questions regarding sexual orientation and identity.

While continuing various educational and media campaigns (including a PSA with Daniel Radcliffe) in 2006, a new short documentary was released consisting of interviews with hotline staff telling stories of calls from LGBTQ youth that they had received.

By 2007, the hotline had received over 100,000 calls since its inception, over 3000 education kits had been distributed, and hundreds of questions had been asked through the "Dear Trevor" online forum from around the world. During National Suicide Prevention Week a digital advertisement campaign named "Don't Erase Your Queer Future" was undertaken which included banner ads on social media websites and The Trevor Project website which encouraged reflection by displaying quotes and progressively erasing words to show how many artistic, cultural, and social contributions would be lost if prominent LGBTQ people would have committed suicide. Additionally, a new PSA with various celebrities was released.

In June 2009, seven Tulare County volunteers completed The Trevor Project Lifeguard Workshop Facilitator training. "Lifeguard workshops" have been done in schools in Tulare County municipalities, including Dinuba, Lindsay, Porterville and Visalia, as well as in Hanford in adjacent Kings County. In November 2009, the Trevor Project was contracted by the Tulare County Suicide Prevention Task Force, located in Tulare County, California. With this agreement, the project received public funds for the first time. Additionally, Sensis provided their digital marketing services including a website redesign and social network marketing on both Facebook and the Trevor Projects own social media website "Trevor Space" (which is still currently operating).

In 2019, The Trevor Project received a $1.5 million grant from Google, which had also donated in years prior.

In January 2020, The Trevor Project received a $1.2 million grant from Google, which was used to fund the nonprofit's suicide prevention programs, including the TrevorLifeline, TrevorChat, and TrevorText programs. In addition to the grant, Google fellows worked pro bono to upgrade its crisis lines, automate moderation of its online forum, refine a virtual training simulator, and promote TrevorSpace. Part of the fellows work included the integration of artificial intelligence into the TrevorChat and TrevorText platforms, using machine learning to assess suicide risk.

In 2021, the first openly gay active NFL player, Carl Nassib, used his coming out to also announce a $100,000 donation to The Trevor Project.

From 2016 to 2022, the CEO of The Trevor Project was Amit Paley. During this period the Trevor Project grew its revenue from $5 million to over $60M which included a financial reserve of $50M. In 2019, for the first time in the organization's history, TrevorText went from limited operating hours to a 24/7 text and chat counseling services. In October 2022, The Trevor Project launched free digital services in Mexico.

In November 2022, The Trevor Project's Board of Directors announced that Amit Paley had been removed effective immediately. The organization's Board of Directors announced that co-founder, Peggy Rajski, would be the interim CEO. Following this news, media outlets also reported that over 200 employees had signed a letter expressing their displeasure with former CEO, Amit Paley, and numerous employees had expressed concerns over the organization's growth and his ability to manage effectively.

In April 2023, Trevor Project staffers formed Friends of Trevor United, a union affiliated with CWA. In July, during collective bargaining, management terminated 12% of bargaining unit employees, about one-third of whom were union leaders. Friends of Trevor responded by filing an Unfair Labor Practice complaint, alleging targeted retaliation.

In July 2024, Jaymes Black became chief executive officer of The Trevor Project, assuming the role as the organization's first Black and first nonbinary CEO.

In 2025, The Trevor Project partnered with the state of California to improve LGBTQ+ focused training for the state's 988 operators. It also sought to display the phone number for the organization’s hotline on all public middle, high school, and college and university student IDs in the area. At the end of that year, The Trevor Project received a $45 million donation from MacKenzie Scott. She had previously donated $6 million to the organization in 2020.

== Projects and research ==
The Trevor Project undertakes mental health research focusing on LGBTQ youth. According to the project's strategic plan, "The Trevor Project will expand the scale of its flagship national survey while continuing to grow visibility and general public consumption of its research; and to incorporate new studies, scientific advances, and research protocols to build on its thought leadership and the impact of its programs." As of 2022, research found that 14% of LGBTQ youth reported a past-year suicide attempt, with LGBTQ youth of color and transgender and nonbinary youth reporting higher rates, illustrating the importance of examining findings intersectionally.

=== Trevor Lifeline, 988 helpline ===
In 2022, 988 added a "Press 3 option" for LGBTQ+ youth to receive assistance from specialized counselors. Initially a pilot program in a government contract with The Trevor Project, the service grew to include seven centers making up the LGBT Youth Subnetwork.

In 2024, the dedicated 988 support program for LGBTQ+ youth received $33 million in funding, according to the Substance Abuse and Mental Health Services Administration (SAMHSA). By June 2025, expenditures for the program had surpassed that amount.

On June 18, 2025 it was confirmed that the Trump administration would be cutting the program known as the "Press 3" option for the 988 Suicide & Crisis Lifeline for LGBTQ+ youth. The administration says the option encourages "radical gender ideology" and plans to "no longer silo" the services and "focus on serving all help seekers, including those previously served through the Press 3 option." Trump administration's proposed budget for 2026 maintains the overall 988 allocation at the same as the previous year at $520 million while removing funding for the LGBTQ+ services.

On September 17, 2025, House representative Raja Krishnamoorthi introduced the 988 LGBTQ+ Youth Access Act of 2025, a bipartisan bill that would require the U.S. Department of Health and Human Services to maintain specialized 988 Suicide & Crisis Lifeline services for LGBTQ+ youth and reserve at least 9 percent of annual 988 Lifeline funding for those services. The House bill was co-sponsored by representatives Michael Lawler, Sharice Davids, Brian Fitzpatrick, and Seth Moulton, with companion legislation introduced in the Senate by Senators Tammy Baldwin and Lisa Murkowski.

The Trevor Project projected that it served 250,000 individuals through the 988 helpline annually, totaling approximately 1.3 million calls while the service was active. The Trevor Project's independent helpline, according to the organization, also serves approximately 250,000 people annually.

=== School workshops ===
The project's Lifeguard Workshop Program uses a structured, age-appropriate curriculum to address topics around sexuality, gender identity, the impacts of language and behavior, and what it means for young people to feel different. The program also teaches young people to recognize depression and suicide amongst their peers, the impacts of language and behavior on LGBTQ youth, and suicide prevention skills in schools.

=== TrevorSpace ===
In 2008, The Trevor Project launched TrevorSpace, a monitored social networking site for LGBTQ+ youth ages 13 to 24.

== See also ==
- Athlete Ally
- List of LGBTQ-related organizations
- Suicide among LGBTQ people
