= Trevor: The Musical =

2017 musical based on the short film Trevor

Trevor: the Musical is a musical based on the 1994 short film Trevor, with book and lyrics by Americans Dan Collins and music by Julianne Wick Davis. The show premiered in Chicago at Writers Theatre on August 9, 2017. It opened off-Broadway at Stage 42 on November 10, 2021, and ran until December 19. The premiere production and the off-Broadway production were directed by Marc Bruni, with choreography by Josh Prince.

Disney+ released a film of the off-Broadway production on June 24, 2022. A 19-track cast album was released by Ghostlight Records on the same day.

== Premise ==
Set in 1981 in the United States, 13-year-old Trevor struggles with school and his crush on classmate Pinky, which draws the attention of bullies.

== Production ==
The producers obtained the rights to the 1994 film in the mid-2010s. The show premiered at the Writers Theatre in Chicago on August 9, 2017, and ran until October 8.

For the off-Broadway production, Hudson Loverro was initially cast to play the titular protagonist, with performances planned to begin on April 7, 2020. However, the COVID-19 pandemic necessitated that the run be pushed back. A nationwide casting call was held to find a new actor to play Trevor; after reviewing 1,400 entries, Holden William Hagelberger was chosen. The show ultimately opened on November 10, 2021, and ran until December 19, ahead of its scheduled closing date of January 2, 2022, due to COVID-19 cases in the cast.

The filmed production was shot over the course of one day in January 2022.

== Cast ==
Role	2017 Chicago	2021 Off-Broadway
Trevor	Eli Tokash; Graydon Peter Yosowitz	Holden William Hagelberger
Pinky	Declan Desmond	Sammy Dell
Diana Ross	Salisha Thomas	Yasmeen Sulieman
Jack	Jhardon DiShon Milton	Aaron Alcaraz
Jason	Reilly Oh	Diego Lucano
Cathy	Tori Whaples	Alyssa Emily Marvin
Frannie	Maya Lou Hlava	Isabel Medina
Mary	Eloise Lushina	Echo Deva Picone
Walter	Matthew Uzarraga	Aryan Simhadri
Mom/Mrs. Kerr	Sophie Grimm	Sally Wilfert
Dad/Father Joe/Coach Gregory	Jarrod Zimmerman	Jarrod Zimmerman

== Reception ==
The 2017 production received three stars from the Chicago Tribune, and both the Chicago Sun-Times and the Chicago Reader praised the cast, although both also felt the show's resolutions felt too tidy and used too much comedy in more serious moments. It won the Jeff Award for Best New Work.

The off-Broadway production, and its filmed release, received mixed reviews.
