= Jaymes Black =

American nonprofit executive

- Born: 1974 or 1975 (age 51–52)
- Education: Colorado Technical University (MS)
- Occupation: Businessperson
- Title: CEO, The Trevor Project
- Spouse: Cheralyn Stevenson (m. 2007)
- Children: 2

Jaymes Black (formerly Stacey Stevenson) is an American nonprofit executive known for their (Note: Black uses all pronouns. This article uses they/them pronouns for consistency.) role as the CEO of The Trevor Project.

== Early life and education ==
Black grew up in southern Texas. While attending high school in Corpus Christi, they accidentally dropped a note for their girlfriend, leading to the outing of their sexuality. Black dropped out of high school, opting to earn a GED. Afterward, they moved to Dallas and found a like-minded community. Black would earn a bachelor's degree in business management from Strayer University when they were 36, and a master’s degree in business administration and management from Colorado Technical University at 40 years old.

== Career ==
In 1997, Black began working for the information technology call center for Stream International, where they were promoted to a leadership position. Black later worked for companies like Charles Schwab, Sabre Corporation, and Northrop Grumman, among others, in similar roles. While working at Charles Schwab, Black held the local and national co-chair of the company’s Pride Employee Resource Group, where they advocated for safe and inclusive workplaces.

During the COVID-19 pandemic, Black decided to shift away from corporate positions, opting to work for nonprofits. In March 2021, they began working for Family Equality, a national nonprofit with the goal of advancing equality for LGBTQ families, holding the roles of CEO and executive director. Black was the first Black person to hold the position of CEO for Family Equality.

In July 2023, Black hosted a talk with Chasten Buttigieg in Provincetown, Massachusetts, for the author’s memoir, I Have Something to Tell You.

In 2024, Black was appointed as the CEO of The Trevor Project, becoming the first Black person and first nonbinary person to hold the role for the organization.

Following an April 2026 performance of Every Brilliant Thing on Broadway, Black took part in a moderated discussion about LGBTQ+ mental health with Daniel Radcliffe.

== Personal life ==
Black met their now-wife, Cheralyn Stevenson, in 2006. The couple was married in Victoria, British Columbia, in 2007, eight years prior to the U.S. Supreme Court decision on same-sex marriage. The family adopted twin boys.

Black identifies as a nonbinary lesbian.

== Recognition ==
Black was honored by Out Magazine, appearing on its 2022 and 2024 Out 100 list of impactful LGBTQ+ people.

In 2026, Time put Black on their list of visionaries and their Time100 Philanthropy list.
