= Trevor (film) =

1994 American film

- Film poster
- Directed by: Peggy Rajski
- Written by: Celeste Lecesne
- Produced by: Randy Stone; Peggy Rajski
- Starring: Brett Barsky
- Cinematography: Marc Reshovsky
- Edited by: John Tintori
- Release date: 1994
- Running time: 23 minutes
- Country: United States
- Language: English

Trevor is a 1994 American short film directed by Peggy Rajski, produced by Randy Stone and Rajski, and written by Celeste Lecesne. (Note: Credited as James Lecesne.) Set in 1981, the film follows what happens to 13-year-old Trevor, a Diana Ross fan, when his crush on a schoolmate named Pinky Faraday is discovered. In 1995, it tied for an Oscar for Best Short Subject with Franz Kafka’s It's a Wonderful Life at the 67th Academy Awards. It won the Teddy Award for Best Short in 1995. In 1998, Rajski brought fellow filmmakers Stone and Lecesne together to found The Trevor Project, a 24/7 crisis and suicide prevention helpline for lesbian, gay, bisexual, transgender and questioning youth.

== Plot ==
In 1981, quirky and outgoing 13-year-old Trevor develops a crush on a boy at his school. Trevor is a fan of singer Diana Ross and wants to dress up as her for Halloween. He also enjoys acting and dancing in school plays. Because of these different interests, Trevor faces discrimination from both his parents and his friends; his parents often try to ignore the fact their son is different, and his friends bully him countless times throughout the school day. Trevor also attends counselling sessions with his parents' priest. His diary, with the boy he has a crush on's name on it, is found by one of his friends and shown to the whole school. Trevor tries to take his life by overdosing on aspirin in his room while listening to Diana Ross, commenting "Everybody at school thinks I'm a gay. It must be showing." He survives his suicide attempt, and as a result, Trevor finds a new friend in a nurse who tends to him. It ends with the nurse giving him tickets to a Diana Ross concert.

== Cast ==
- Brett Barsky as Trevor
- Judy Kain as Trevor's Mom
- John Lizzi as Trevor's Dad
- Jonah Rooney as Pinky Farraday
- Stephen Tobolowsky as Father Jon
- Cory M. Miller as Jack
- Allen Dorane as Walter Stiltman
- Lindsay Pomerantz as Cathy Quinn
- Alicia Anderson as Mary Zapatelli
- Courtney Dornstein as Francine Antoniello

== Stage adaptation ==
The film has been adapted into a stage musical titled Trevor: The Musical. The musical's book and lyrics were written by Dan Collins while the music was composed by Julianne Wick Davis. It premiered in previews at the Writers Theatre in Glencoe, Illinois on August 9, 2017. It opened Off Broadway at Stage 42 to mixed reviews on November 10, 2021. That same year, RadicalMedia recorded the show for a public release, with Disney+ acquiring the distribution rights and releasing it on June 24, 2022 for Pride Month.

== Legacy ==
The short film played a pivotal role in LGBTQ+ activism, directly inspiring the 1998 founding of The Trevor Project, a leading suicide prevention and crisis intervention organization for LGBTQ+ youth.
