= Legends of the Fall =

1994 film

- Theatrical release poster
- Directed by: Edward Zwick
- Screenplay by: Susan Shilliday; William D. Wittliff
- Based on: Legends of the Fall by Jim Harrison
- Produced by: Marshall Herskovitz; William D. Wittliff; Edward Zwick
- Starring: Brad Pitt; Anthony Hopkins; Aidan Quinn; Julia Ormond; Henry Thomas
- Cinematography: John Toll
- Edited by: Steven Rosenblum
- Music by: James Horner
- Production companies: TriStar Pictures; Bedford Falls Productions
- Distributed by: Sony Pictures Releasing
- Release date: December 23, 1994
- Running time: 133 minutes
- Country: United States
- Language: English
- Budget: $30 million
- Box office: $160.6 million

Legends of the Fall is a 1994 American epic historical Western drama film directed by Edward Zwick, and starring Brad Pitt, Anthony Hopkins, Aidan Quinn, Julia Ormond and Henry Thomas. Based on the 1979 novella of the same title by Jim Harrison, the film is about three brothers and their father living in the wilderness and plains of Montana in the early 20th century and how their lives are affected by nature, history, war, and love. The film's timeframe spans nearly 50 years from the early 20th century to 1963. Legends of the Fall was released by Sony Pictures Releasing on December 23, 1994. The film received mixed reviews from critics and grossed $160.6 million against a $30 million budget. The film was nominated for three Academy Awards and won for Best Cinematography (John Toll).

== Plot ==
Colonel William Ludlow retires from the Army to a remote part of Montana, sick of betrayals the US government perpetrated on Native Americans. He builds a ranch with One Stab and raises his family. Working the ranch are hired hand and former outlaw Decker with his Cree wife Pet, and daughter Isabel Two. William's wife Isabel does not adapt to the harsh Montana winters and moves to the East Coast. Tristan, the middle of the family's three sons, vows never to speak of her. At age 12, Tristan touches a sleeping grizzly bear, which awakens and injures him, but he cuts off a claw.

Years later Samuel, the youngest son, returns from Harvard University with his fiancée, Susannah. Before they can marry, Samuel announces his intention to join the Canadian Expeditionary Force and aid Britain in the fight against Germany in World War I. To William's displeasure, the eldest son Alfred also joins. Tristan reluctantly joins after swearing to Susannah to protect Samuel.

The brothers go to France with the 10th Battalion, CEF. Alfred, commissioned as an officer, is wounded in a failed frontal assault against enemy trenches. Samuel and Tristan survive the battle. While visiting Alfred in the field hospital, Tristan learns Samuel volunteered for a dangerous reconnaissance mission. He rushes to find his brother, who is wounded in no man's land and dies in Tristan's arms. Tristan cuts his brother's heart out and sends it home to be buried at the ranch. Maddened with grief, Tristan single-handedly raids the German lines and returns with German scalps hanging around his neck, horrifying his fellow soldiers.

Alfred returns to Montana and proposes to Susannah. She rejects the proposal, and when she finds Tristan weeping over Samuel's grave, she comforts him and they become lovers. Alfred jealously confronts Tristan before leaving the ranch for work in Helena. Tristan is plagued with guilt by Samuel's death and Alfred's departure from the ranch and he, too, leaves Montana to travel. Susannah vows to wait for him but receives a letter telling her to marry someone else. Alfred comforts her but William considers his attention toward her a betrayal and they fall out. William suffers a stroke and falls silent for years as the ranch deteriorates. Susannah marries Alfred, now a congressman whose business and political interests conflict with the O'Banion brothers, Irish bootleggers and gangsters.

Tristan returns to the ranch during Prohibition. He falls in love with Isabel Two and they marry and have two children. His involvement running rum puts him at odds with the O'Banions. Isabel Two is accidentally killed during a confronation with a corrupt police officer and Tristan is jailed for beating the policeman. Susannah confesses still having feelings for Tristan, but he refuses her advances and after release from jail he and Decker kill those responsible for Isabel's death, including one of the O'Banions. Susannah, distraught and lovelorn, commits suicide. The remaining O'Banion brother comes after Tristan with the corrupt sheriff, and they are killed by William and Alfred. Alfred, Tristan and William reconcile, realizing Tristan will be blamed for the deaths and hunted relentlessly by the O'Banions' allies. They hide the evidence of the killings, and Tristan departs.

In 1963, Tristan, now an old man living in the North Country, has outlived the rest of the family. While investigating an animal carcass he's ambushed by a grizzly bear. He draws his knife and grapples with the bear.

== Cast ==
- Brad Pitt as Tristan Ludlow
  - Keegan MacIntosh as Young Tristan Ludlow
  - Eric Johnson as Teen Tristan Ludlow
  - Doug Seus as Old Tristan Ludlow
- Anthony Hopkins as Colonel William Ludlow
- Aidan Quinn as Alfred Ludlow
- Julia Ormond as Susannah Fincannon-Ludlow
- Henry Thomas as Samuel Ludlow
- Karina Lombard as Isabel "Isabel Two" Decker-Ludlow
  - Sekwan Auger as Young Isabel Two Decker
- Gordon Tootoosis as One Stab
- Christina Pickles as Isabel Ludlow
- Paul Desmond as Tom Cullen/Roscoe Decker
- Tantoo Cardinal as Pet Decker
- Robert Wisden as John T. O'Banion
- John Novak as James O'Banion
- Kenneth Welsh as Sheriff Tynert
- Bart the Bear as The Bear

== Production ==
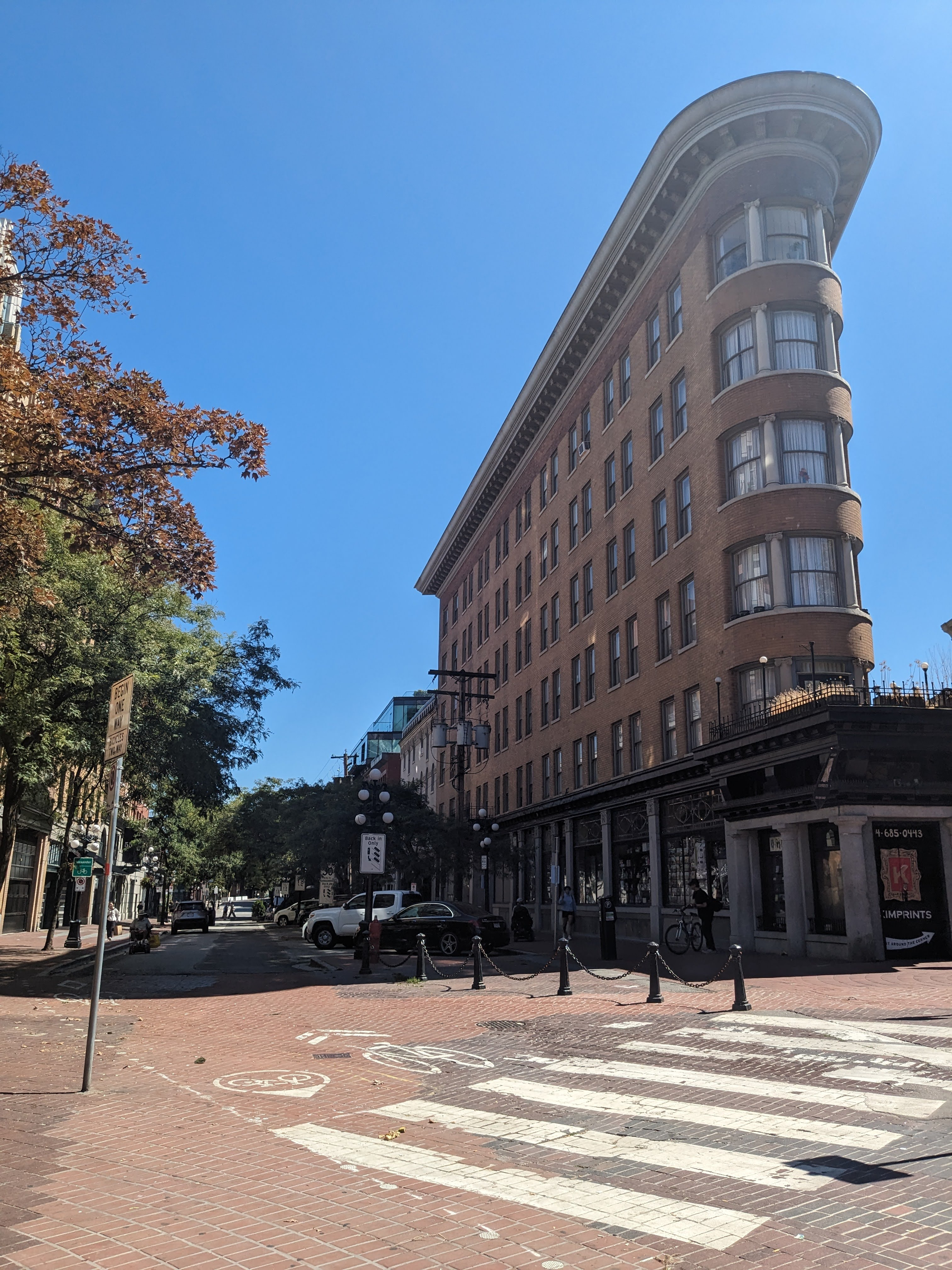
Scenes depicting Helena, Montana were filmed on Alexander St. and in Hotel Europe in the neighborhood of Gastown, Vancouver, Canada.

Legends of the Fall was primarily filmed on location in Alberta and British Columbia, Canada. Principal photography began in mid-July 1993. The World War I battlefield scenes took two weeks to film and were shot near Morley, Alberta, with hundreds of locals and a few Canadian Forces soldiers recruited as extras. The Ghost River Wilderness Area in Alberta served as the filming location for the Ludlow ranch; additional outdoor scenes, as well as the funeral and cemetery scenes, were shot at the Bow River near Banff National Park. A historic harbour area in Vancouver called Gastown was augmented with period building facades for the Helena, Montana, street scenes. Hotel scenes were shot at the Hotel Europe at 43 Powell Street in Vancouver. Additional scenes were shot at Maple Tree Square in Gastown, Vancouver, and Ocho Rios in Saint Ann, Jamaica. Filming wrapped up around January 1994.

In 2024, Edward Zwick released his memoir, Hits, Flops, and Other Illusions: My Fortysomething Years in Hollywood, in which he talked about his difficult experiences working with Brad Pitt, whom he described as volatile. Zwick claimed that they clashed over their visions for the film, and that Pitt was upset about the final cut.

Both the film and the book on which it is based contain occasional Cornish language terms. The Ludlow family portrayed in the film is a Cornish American immigrant family.

== Reception ==
=== Box office ===
The film opened in limited release on December 23, 1994, and expanded to a wide release on January 13, 1995. During its first weekend in wide release, a four-day weekend due to Martin Luther King, Jr. Day, the film reached number one at the domestic box office after grossing $14 million. After its initial run, the film brought in a final box office total of $160,638,883. Against its $30 million budget, the film was a financial success.

=== Critical response ===
Review aggregator website Rotten Tomatoes reports that 61% of 61 film critics have given the film a positive review, with a rating average of 6/10. The site's consensus states: "Featuring a swoon-worthy star turn by Brad Pitt, Legends of the Fall's painterly photography and epic sweep often compensate for its lack of narrative momentum and glut of melodramatic twists." Metacritic, which assigns a weighted average score out of 100 to reviews from mainstream critics, gives the film a score of 45 based on 23 reviews, indicating "mixed or average" reviews. Audiences polled by CinemaScore gave the film an average grade of "A-" on an A+ to F scale.

Roger Ebert of the Chicago Sun-Times described the film as "pretty good ... with full-blooded performances and heartfelt melodrama". Peter Travers of Rolling Stone particularly praised Pitt's performance saying: "Though the admirable Quinn has the toughest role, Pitt carries the picture. The blue-eyed boy who seemed a bit lost in Interview with the Vampire proves himself a bona fide movie star, stealing every scene he's in." Comparatively, Chris Hicks of Deseret News noted: "Pitt is the hunk of the moment, and Legends of the Fall will only further cement his big-screen, romantic leading-man status. And he is satisfying as the internalized, rebellious Tristan (look for that name to be given to more than a few babies over the next few years). Even if the character seems only a slight twist on the similar role he played in A River Runs Through It. (He even becomes a bootlegger!)" Multiple critics compared the plot of the Ludlow brothers to films like East of Eden and Giant.

On the other hand, Rita Kempley of The Washington Post stated that the film's "yarn doesn't so much sweep as sprawl across the screen in all its panoramic idiocy". While some critics praised the film's performances and cinematography, they also felt the plot takes on much more than it can handle and might be better suited for a miniseries. John Hartl of The Seattle Times wrote: "The actors fit their roles exceptionally well, but Zwick rarely allows them the kinds of crucial, intimate moments that establish how the characters feel about each other. Occasionally the story grips, suggesting what might have been if the actors had been playing people instead of archetypes." The film's script and its propensity for melodrama was also critiqued, with some saying the story reaches soap opera-like heights and leaves its characters underdeveloped. Variety wrote: "As densely plotted as Legends of the Fall is, it's to the credit of the performers and craftsmen that the film escapes the abyss of melodrama and sentimentality. Zwick imbues the story with an easy, poetic quality that mostly sidesteps the precious. The actors, working as an ensemble, are near perfect in the service of the material." In contrast, Terrence Rafferty of The New Yorker described the film as a "father-and-sons saga" that "gets sillier as it goes".

Janet Maslin of The New York Times commented: "Before it turns exhaustingly hollow, this film shows the potential for bringing Mr. Harrison's tough, brooding tale to life. And the actors may have captured the spirit of the story, but that's impossible to know." She concluded, "These are performances that lost too much in the editing room, smothered by music and overshadowed by a picture-postcard vision of the American West." In The Baltimore Sun, Stephen Hunter wrote: "What Legends of the Fall lacks is any spirit of rigor. It buys into -- indeed, is selling -- the oldest of guff: the idea that the violence of banal men is beautiful and righteous. It honors male anger...[it] worships the red shift of men gone nuts on vengeance. It romanticizes gunplay. It's a big movie that's so small on the inside it's not there."

=== Year end lists ===
- Top 10 (listed alphabetically, not ranked) – Bob Ross, The Tampa Tribune
- Top 10 (listed alphabetically, not ranked) – Jeff Simon, The Buffalo News

=== Accolades ===
Award	Category	Recipient	Result	Ref.
Academy Awards	Best Cinematography	John Toll	Won	
Academy Awards	Best Art Direction	Lilly Kilvert, Dorree Cooper	Nominated	
Academy Awards	Best Sound	Paul Massey, David E. Campbell, Christopher David and Douglas Ganton	Nominated	
Golden Globe Awards	Best Motion Picture – Drama		Nominated	
Golden Globe Awards	Best Director	Edward Zwick	Nominated	
Golden Globe Awards	Best Actor – Motion Picture Drama	Brad Pitt	Nominated	
Golden Globe Awards	Best Original Score	James Horner	Nominated	

== Home media ==
Legends of the Fall was released on VHS on May 31, 1995, followed by its first DVD release on April 29, 1997. A special edition DVD was released on October 17, 2000, with bonus content including two audio commentaries, deleted scenes with optional commentary, and two behind-the-scenes featurettes. On November 29, 2005, a deluxe edition DVD was released. On February 8, 2011, the film was released on Blu-ray.
