= Ryan Amador =

American singer-songwriter

- Born: United States
- Genres: Indie pop
- Occupations: Musician; songwriter; producer; director; writer; activist
- Instruments: Singing; guitar; piano
- Years active: 2011–present
- Label: Self-Release
- Website: ryanamador.com

Ryan Amador (born 1989 or 1990) is an American singer-songwriter and LGBT rights advocate.

== Early life and education ==
Amador began recording demos of original songs in Hollywood at the age of 12. He acted in musicals while in school. He graduated from New York University in 2011 with a degree in drama.

== Career ==
Amador released his first EP Symptoms of a Wide Eyed Being which was produced by Justin Goldner and Shaina Taub. He went on tour though Chicago in 2012. He later released a second EP Palos Verdes: A Teenage Retrospective. Amador is a recurring guest on the radio channel, OutQ and has performed at pride events in New York, Cleveland, and Pittsburgh where he opened for Adam Lambert. He released his debut album Ryan Amador in June 2013. It went on Spotify in September 2013. The lead single of the album is "Define Me" featuring Jo Lampert. The music video includes Lampert and Amador taking off their clothes to reveal anti-gay slurs written on their bodies. The music video was directed by Tom Gustafson. The song was written for a youth LGBTQ conference. Amador released the single and music view "Instead," a piano ballad about desire for a former lover. In 2015, he released a single "Spectrum" featuring Lampert and Gyasi Ross. It is about the spectrum of sexual identities and includes a music video. In 2016, Amador released "Light Me Up" featuring Daniel Weidlein. The song is a queer version of Hollywood gangster film. The music video was directed by Mark Solomon. In 2018, Amador released the LGBTQ themed single, "Loverboy." The song was inspired by the film, Call Me by Your Name and features a 1980s-influenced synthesized beat. A music video was released starring director Jesse Scott Egan. "Loverboy" is the second single for the album The American. Proceeds from the song will be donated to Basic Rights Oregon.

Amador and Celeste Lecesne are the co-founders of The Future Perfect Project, a program to for LGBTQ high school students to share stories and express themselves in performances, musical compositions, and original writing.

== Artistry ==
Amador is inspired by progressive artists including Gotye and Janelle Monáe. His music is influenced by Damien Rice, Jason Mraz, and John Legend.

== Personal life ==
Amador is based in Los Angeles and Brooklyn. He is gay.

== Discography ==
=== Studio albums ===
- Ryan Amador (2013)
- (In) Body Vol. 1: Becoming (2016)
- The American (2019)
- Love in the Age of Anxiety (2022)

=== Compilations ===
- The American (Deluxe) [2020]
- Ryan Amador (10th Anniversary Edition) [2023]

=== Extended plays ===
- Symptoms of a Wide Eyed Being (2012)
- Palos Verdes: A Teenage Retrospective (2012)
- 4S (2014)
- Seattle Songs (2017)
- The Lost Tapes (2017)

=== Singles ===
List of singles as lead artist, showing year released and album name
Title	Year	Album
In A Little Room	2011	Symptoms of a Wide Eyed Being
Apology	2011	Symptoms of a Wide Eyed Being
On The Surface	2013	Ryan Amador
Define Me	2013	Ryan Amador
Instead	2013	Ryan Amador
Stained	2014	4S
Spectrum	2015	4S
Fireplace	2016	non-album single
Under My Sk(in) [From #Relevant]	2016	non-album single
Light Me Up	2016	(In) Body Vol. 1: Becoming
Safe in Your Heart	2016	(In) Body Vol. 1: Becoming
Talk in the Morning	2016	(In) Body Vol. 1: Becoming
Balloon	2016	(In) Body Vol. 1: Becoming
Someone	2017	Seattle Songs
Maryanne	2017	Seattle Songs
Saint of Love	2017	The Lost Tapes
Try a Little Kindness	2018	The American
Loverboy	2018	The American
Hospitals	2018	The American
Lucky to Be So Blind	2018	The American
Liars	2018	The American
Walk On By	2018	The American
Inches Away	2018	The American
Neighbors	2018	The American
Like a Woman	2019	The American (Deluxe)
Weirdo	2019	The American (Deluxe)
The American	2020	The American
Healing Song	2020	Love in the Age of Anxiety
I Don't Want to Post This	2020	Love in the Age of Anxiety
All My Friends Are Brands	2020	Love in the Age of Anxiety
Lost Friends	2021	Love in the Age of Anxiety
HBD	2021	Love in the Age of Anxiety
No Looking Back	2021	Love in the Age of Anxiety
Used To U	2022	Love in the Age of Anxiety
UR EX	2022	Love in the Age of Anxiety
Every Day	2022	Love in the Age of Anxiety
Are We Over	2022	Love in the Age of Anxiety
False Alarm	2023	non-album single
Define Me (Pride Club Edition)	2023	Ryan Amador (10th Anniversary Edition)
Define Me (String Quartet Remix)	2023	Ryan Amador (10th Anniversary Edition)
Instead (String Quartet Remix)	2023	Ryan Amador (10th Anniversary Edition)
