= Randy Stone =

American actor (1958–2007)

- Born: August 26, 1958
- Died: February 12, 2007 (aged 48); Beverly Hills, California, U.S.
- Occupations: Producer, actor, casting director
- Known for: co-founder of The Trevor Project
- Spouse: Roslyn Kind (m. 1983; div. 1988)
- Awards: Emmy Award for Outstanding Casting for a Miniseries or Special; 1990 The Incident; Academy Award for Best Live Action Short Film; 1994 Trevor

Randy Stone (August 26, 1958 – February 12, 2007) was an American actor, producer, and casting director. He was a co-founder of The Trevor Project.

== Career ==
=== Acting ===
Stone began his acting career in 1976 as a child actor on Charlie's Angels. However, most of his acting roles were as an adult. He appeared in two episodes of Space: Above and Beyond, and did two film roles. His most notable performance was as the hapless gay Los Angeles millionaire Michael Beebe in the second-season episode Beware of the Dog on the television series Millennium.

=== Casting ===
Stone's primary career was as a casting director. He began working with The Landsberg Company in 1981. His first job was casting the NBC series Gimme a Break! He was head of casting at 20th Century Fox Television, and was responsible for casting David Duchovny and Gillian Anderson on The X-Files and Lance Henriksen on Millennium. In 1998, Stone, who was gay, was terminated at Fox and filed a complaint with the California State Labor Commission that he had been illegally discriminated against on the basis of his sexual orientation. The company refused to comply with the Commission's decision.

Among his more notable film and television casting jobs were the film Jaws 3-D (1983), the made-for-TV movie The Ryan White Story (1989), Cameron Crowe's directorial film debut Say Anything... (1989), the made-for-TV movie The Incident (1990) and the television series Space: Above and Beyond.

=== Producing ===
In later years, he also produced several films. He was executive producer for the film Little Man Tate, Jodie Foster's directorial debut motion picture. He and co-producer/director Peggy Rajski won an Oscar for the 1994 short film Trevor, a comedy-drama about a gay teenage boy's attempted suicide. Ellen DeGeneres hosted a special airing of the film on HBO in 1998. In 2006, Stone wrote and executive produced the television film A Little Thing Called Murder, starring Judy Davis, based on the story of murderer Sante Kimes. It won him the International Press Academy's Satellite Award for Motion Picture Made for Television.

=== The Trevor Project ===
In 1998, Stone co-founded a nonprofit organization inspired by the film Trevor, called The Trevor Project. The organization runs a 24-hour, toll-free suicide prevention hotline aimed at gay and questioning youth in the United States. The organization produced teaching guides and support materials for distribution to teens in schools.

== Personal life ==
In 1983, Stone married Roslyn Kind, half-sister of Barbra Streisand. After their 1988 divorce, he came out as gay. He was close friends with Jodie Foster.

On February 12, 2007, Stone died of heart disease at his home in Beverly Hills, California.

== Awards ==
In addition to his Oscar, he and fellow casting director Holly Powell won an Emmy Award in 1990 for Outstanding Casting for a Miniseries or Special for The Incident. Stone and Powell were only the second recipients of this award, which had been established in 1989.

He was nominated three times for an Artios Award by the Casting Society of America. In 1982, he was nominated for Best Casting for Comedy Episodic TV for his work on Cheers. In 1986, he and co-casting director Lori Openden were nominated in the same category for casting the pilot episode of All Is Forgiven. And in 1991 he was nominated for Best Casting for a TV Miniseries for Switched at Birth.
