= Dorree Cooper =

American set decorator

- Born: New Orleans, Louisiana, United States
- Occupation: Set decorator
- Years active: 1983-present

Dorree Cooper is an American set decorator. She was nominated for an Academy Award in the category Best Art Direction for the film Legends of the Fall.

== Selected filmography ==
- Legends of the Fall (1994)
