= Franz Kafka's It's a Wonderful Life =

1993 British short comedy film

- Directed by: Peter Capaldi
- Written by: Peter Capaldi
- Produced by: Ruth Kenley-Letts
- Starring: Richard E. Grant
- Cinematography: Simon Maggs
- Edited by: Nikki Clemens
- Music by: Philip Appleby
- Production companies: BBC Scotland; The Scottish Film Production Fund; Conundrum Films
- Release date: 1993
- Running time: 23 minutes
- Country: United Kingdom
- Language: English

Franz Kafka's It's a Wonderful Life is a 1993 British short comedy film written and directed by Peter Capaldi. It stars Richard E. Grant as Franz Kafka and co-stars Ken Stott. The title refers to the name of the writer Franz Kafka and the 1946 film It's a Wonderful Life, directed by Frank Capra, and the plot takes the concept of the two to absurd depths.

The film features a rendition of "Ah! Sweet Mystery of Life" from the 1910 operetta Naughty Marietta.

In 1994, the short won the BAFTA Award for Best Short Film. The following year it won the Academy Award for Best Live Action Short Film, tying with Trevor.

== Synopsis ==
The great writer Franz Kafka is about to write his famous 1915 work, The Metamorphosis, but inspiration is lacking, and he suffers continual interruptions.

== Cast ==
- Richard E. Grant – Franz Kafka
- Crispin Letts – Gregor Samsa
- Ken Stott – Woland the Knifeman
- Elaine Collins – Miss Cicely
- Phyllis Logan – Frau Bunofsky
- Julie Cox – Party Girl
- Jessie Doyle – Party Girl
- Samantha Howarth – Party Girl
- Justine Luxton – Party Girl
- Laura Reiss – Party Girl
- Thea Tait – Party Girl
- Lucy Woodhouse – Party Girl

== Accolades ==
Year	Award	Category	Recipient(s)	Result	Ref.
1993	BAFTA Scotland Award	Best Short Film	Peter Capaldi	Won	
1993	Atlantic Film Festival Award	Best Live Action Film	Peter Capaldi	Won	
1993	Atlantic Film Festival Award	Best Short Film	Peter Capaldi	Won	
1993	Atlantic Film Festival Award	Best Set Design	John Beard	Won	
1994	Angers European First Film Festival Audience Award	Short Film	Peter Capaldi	Won	
1994	BAFTA Film Award	Best Short Film	Peter Capaldi, Ruth Kenley-Letts	Won	
1994	Celtic Media Festival Award	Best New Director	Peter Capaldi	Won	
1994	Vevey International Funny Film Festival Award	Prix Schwartz Best Short Film	Peter Capaldi	Won	
1995	Academy Award	Live Action Short Film	Peter Capaldi, Ruth Kenley-Letts	Won (Note: Tied with Trevor.)	
