= Erica Russell =

New Zealand animator

- Born: 1951 (age 74–75)
- Occupation: Film animator
- Years active: 1972 -
- Known for: Gingco, a production company
- Notable work: Triangle, Our Girl

Erica Russell (born 1951) is a New Zealand-born film animator.

== Life and career ==
Russell was born in Auckland, New Zealand in 1951. Her family emigrated to South Africa in 1953, where she grew up with a fascination for traditional customs, music and dance. In 1972 she moved to London and worked with animators Richard Williams, Gerald Scarfe and Disney's Art Babbitt. She worked at Rocky Morton's Cucumber Studios, where she worked with Morton and Annabel Jankel on music videos and animations for television.

Russell eventually opened her own studio, named Eyeworks, and worked on commercial projects such as a campaign for the launch of Virgin Megastores. Her first solo project was Feet of Song in 1988, which became part of a trilogy of dance films; it was followed by Triangle (1994) and SOMA (2001). All three films were funded by Channel 4, a British television company.

In 1992, Russell opened her own production company, Gingco.

== Accolades ==
Russell's film Triangle was nominated for an Academy Award for Best Animated Short Film. The short film Our Girl, on which Russell worked as animator and designer, won the Bronze World Medal at the New York Festivals in 2015.

== See also ==
- Independent animation
- Cinema of New Zealand
