= Celeste Lecesne =

American actor and writer

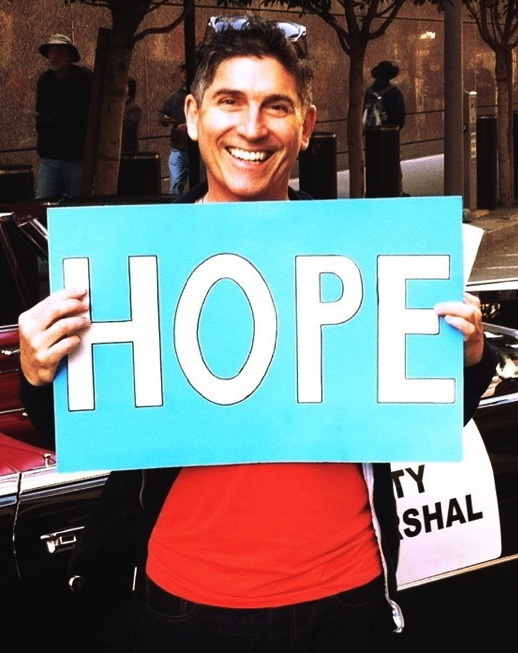
- Lecesne attending San Francisco Pride as its Grand Marshall in 2011
- Born: November 24, 1954 (age 71); New Jersey, U.S.
- Occupations: Actor; author; screenwriter
- Years active: 1983–present
- Notable work: The Trevor Project; Trevor (film)
- Website: www.celestelecesne.com

James Celeste Lecesne (born November 24, 1954) is an American actor, author, screenwriter, and LGBT rights activist, best known for the Academy Award-winning short film Trevor. Lecesne has written several books including Absolute Brightness and Virgin Territory, and is also active in the entertainment industry as an actor and producer.

== Screenwriting career ==
Lecesne wrote the 1995 short film Trevor, which won the Academy Award for Best Live Action Short Film. Lecesne based the screenplay for Trevor on a character from their one-man show Word of Mouth. Also in 1995, Word of Mouth won the Drama Desk Award for Outstanding One-Person Show. Word of Mouth was directed by Eve Ensler.

== The Trevor Project ==
In 1998, on the night Ellen DeGeneres hosted the television debut of Trevor on HBO, Lecesne co-founded and launched The Trevor Project as the first nationwide 24-hour crisis intervention lifeline for lesbian, gay, bisexual, transgender and questioning youth, including phone, in-person and online life-affirming resources such as Trevor Lifeline, TrevorChat, TrevorSpace, Ask Trevor and Trevor Education Workshops. The Trevor Project has been supported by a wide variety of celebrities, including Daniel Radcliffe, Neil Patrick Harris, James Marsden, Kim Kardashian, George Takei, and Anderson Cooper. Lecesne and Ryan Amador are the co-founders of The Future Project, a program for LGBTQ high school students to share stories and express themselves in performances, musical compositions, and original writing.

== Publishing career ==
In 1993, Lecesne published My First Car, an illustrated collection of reminiscences in which dozens of celebrities recall the loss of their "auto-virginity." The book, released by Crown Trade Paperback, contained more than 100 stories and was illustrated with pictures of celebrities and their cars.

In 2008, the HarperCollins imprint HarperTeen published Lecesnes's young adult novel Absolute Brightness, the story of "a luminous force of nature, a boy named Leonard Pelkey, who encounters evil and whose magic isn't truly felt until he disappears."

In 2010, Lecesne's book Virgin Territory was published by EgmontUSA, and marketed to teenagers grades 9 and up. The Denver Public Library Review stated: "Teenager Dylan Flack, since the death of his mother, has left New York City for Jupiter, FL, trying to reinvent his life. Eclectic in spirit, exploring sexual desire, pondering the mysterious connections between people, there's nothing religious here, despite the title. Nor is virginity the topic, although Dylan loses his. It's just Lecesne gently laying bare both the humor and pain that accompany love and loss."

In 2013, Lecesne updated their Oscar-winning short film, Trevor, turning it into a novella. Publishers Weekly stated: "It's the story of 13-year-old Trevor, a boy who stages a re-enactment of Jacques-Louis David’s La Mort de Marat in his bathtub, and plans to dress up as his idol, Lady Gaga, for Halloween. (In the film Trevor, the teenager was a diehard Diana Ross fan.) While Trevor isn’t ready to declare himself gay, he doesn’t want anyone else doing so on his behalf, either (“Some of us prefer to remain a mystery—even to ourselves”). Trevor's interests (Lady Gaga, theater, his baseball-playing buddy Pinky) make him a target, however, culminating in the word 'faggot' being scrawled on his locker and a subsequent suicide attempt. Given the story's long history, it's no surprise that Lecesne nails Trevor's personality and voice, a combination of self-assuredness, sharp humor, and enthusiasm." Lecesne also contributed pencil drawings to the book, which was published by Triangle Square Publishing.

== Theatrical career ==
Lecesne, an off-Broadway veteran, made their Broadway debut in 2012 performing the role of Dick Jensen in Gore Vidal's political drama The Best Man, which also starred James Earl Jones, Angela Lansbury, Cybill Shepherd, and Eric McCormack.

In February 2015, Lecesne's play "The Absolute Brightness of Leonard Pelkey," a solo show adapted from Lecesne's 2008 young adult novel, opened at Dixon Place in New York City with high praise from theater critics. The production is directed by Tony Speciale, with music by Duncan Sheik. In July 2015, the show opened at the off-Broadway Westside Theatre where it completed a successful run in November 2015. The New York Times theater review stated: "A show about the brutal murder of a 14-year-old boy should not, logically speaking, leave you beaming with joy. And yet that’s the paradoxical effect of 'The Absolute Brightness of Leonard Pelkey', a superlative solo show written and performed by [Lecesne], himself a pretty darn dazzling beacon of theatrical talent." In January 2016, "The Absolute Brightness of Leonard Pelkey" opened in Los Angeles at the Kirk Douglas Theatre. The play was presented by The Philadelphia Theatre Company in May and June 2017.

== Private life ==
As of 2020, Lecesne goes by their middle name, Celeste. Lecesne uses he/they pronouns.

Lecesne practices Nichiren Buddhism as a member of the global Buddhist association Soka Gakkai International. As part of their spiritual practice, Lecesne has stated that they recite the Buddhist chant Namu Myōhō Renge Kyō each day.
