= Chris David (sound engineer) =

English sound engineer

- Born: 14 June 1953 (age 72); Kensington, London, England
- Occupation: Sound engineer
- Years active: 1982 – present

Chris David (born 14 June 1953) is an English sound engineer. He was nominated for an Academy Award in the category Best Sound for the film Legends of the Fall. He has worked on 170-plus films since 1982.

== Selected filmography ==
- Legends of the Fall (1994)
