= Little Man Tate =

1991 American film by Jodie Foster

- Theatrical release poster
- Directed by: Jodie Foster
- Written by: Scott Frank
- Produced by: Peggy Rajski; Scott Rudin
- Starring: Jodie Foster; Dianne Wiest; Harry Connick Jr.; Adam Hann-Byrd
- Cinematography: Mike Southon
- Edited by: Lynzee Klingman
- Music by: Mark Isham
- Distributed by: Orion Pictures (United States); Columbia Pictures (International)
- Release date: October 18, 1991
- Running time: 99 minutes
- Country: United States
- Language: English
- Budget: $10 million
- Box office: $25 million

Little Man Tate is a 1991 American drama film directed by Jodie Foster (in her directorial debut) from a screenplay written by Scott Frank. The film stars Adam Hann-Byrd as Fred Tate, a seven-year-old child prodigy who struggles to self-actualize in social and psychological settings that largely fail to accommodate his intelligence. It also stars Foster, Dianne Wiest, Harry Connick Jr., David Hyde Pierce, Debi Mazar and P.J. Ochlan.

Little Man Tate was released theatrically on October 18, 1991, by Orion Pictures to critical and commercial success. Reviewers praised Foster's direction, Frank's screenplay and the performances of the cast. The film grossed $25 million domestically, on a $10 million budget.

== Plot ==
Dede Tate is a young working-class woman of average intelligence and strong instincts, raising her seven-year-old son, Fred, alone. Fred shows every indication of being a genius. Fred's reading and mathematics abilities are remarkable, and he plays the piano "at competition level", but his intellect has isolated him from his public school classmates. He calls his mother, who loves him unconditionally, by her first name.

Fred's abilities come to the attention of Jane Grierson, a former music prodigy and now a psychologist running a school for gifted children. She asks permission from Dede to admit Fred to the school, in order to develop his intellectual gifts in ways that a public school cannot. Dede is reluctant, preferring that Fred have a more normal upbringing, but when no one comes to Fred's seventh birthday party, Dede consents.

Fred joins other brilliant young people, and participates in Jane's Odyssey of the Mind event for part of the spring. There he meets one of his heroes, who is one of Jane's prized pupils, the brilliant but slightly bizarre "Mathemagician" Damon Wells, a whiz at math who wears a black cape wherever he goes. After Fred unintentionally upstages Damon at one of the competitions at Odyssey of the Mind, the latter is upset with the former. Damon, however, warms up to Fred when out horseback riding on Jane's ranch, and is Fred's first insight to a world outside academia. Damon tells him: "It's not the size of a man's IQ that matters; it's how he uses it." Jane attempts to become more nurturing, but is unable to relate to Fred as anything other than a case study.

Fred is later enrolled at a university, where he studies quantum physics while his mother, aunt and cousins travel to Florida for the summer. An adult student named Eddie accidentally hits Fred with a globe when goofing around. To make it up to Fred, Eddie takes him out for a ride on his moped and shows him things such as how to shoot pool; it is good for Fred to spend time with someone who's not a genius. However, when he walks into Eddie's room while he's in bed with a woman, Fred runs out and Eddie chases after him. Eddie explains that he cannot be a babysitter for Fred; although he enjoys his company, Fred needs to find friends closer to his own age. The return to isolation takes its toll on Fred, as he suffers from nightmares in which he is treated as a freak and an outsider.

Jane is asked to bring Fred onto a TV panel discussion show on the topic of gifted children. Fred attends but breaks down. Dede tunes into the program from Florida and reacts immediately to Fred’s visual appearance, remarking to herself, “you look like hell, kid.” On the air, Fred claims his mother is dead, and recites a childish poem (a word-for-word repetition of a poem by Matt Montini, one of his former grade school classmates) before taking off his microphone and walking out of the studio. Jane is unable to find Fred, and she and her assistant Garth communicate with Dede. Dede suspects Fred has gone home to their apartment, and flies back. She finds him there, and embraces him, with him calling her "mom". Jane appears at the door, and upon seeing that Fred has what he needs, turns and walks away.

One year later, Fred continues to attend Jane’s school and has adjusted to the pressures of being a child genius, particularly after an even younger student is admitted to Jane's school. Dede hosts a well-attended 8th birthday party for Fred, reconciling Fred's emotional development with his intellect.

== Cast ==
- Jodie Foster as Dede Tate
- Dianne Wiest as Jane Grierson
- Adam Hann-Byrd as Fred Tate
  - Alex Lee as Fred Tate Age 2
  - Geoffrey C. York as Infant Fred Tate
- Harry Connick Jr. as Eddie
- David Pierce as Garth Emmerick
- Debi Mazar as Gina
- Josh Mostel as Physics Professor
- P.J. Ochlan as Damon Wells
- Celia Weston as Miss Nimvel
- Danitra Vance as Clinic Doctor
- Michael Shulman as Matt Montini
- Carolyn Lawrence as Sorority Girl
- Nathan Lee as Matt's Teammate
- Richard Fredette as The Bartender
- George Plimpton as Winston F. Buckner
- Elizabeth H. Frietsch as Live Wire Girl
- Jennifer Trier as Grierson Institute Teacher
- Lawrence Gallegos as Fraternity Guy
- D. Michael Pierce as College Student
- Evan Prizant as Child Star, The Adding Machine
- Ellen McElduff as Make Up Woman
- Bob Balaban as Quizmaster (uncredited)
- Gordon Greene as The Doctor

== Production ==
Jodie Foster, who is herself a former child prodigy, was immediately impressed by the film's narrative and was interested in directing it. Orion Pictures was on the verge of bankruptcy at the time and was skeptical about Foster directing the film. They ultimately agreed after she offered to act in the film without payment. The film includes certain autobiographical elements from Foster's life.

Most of the film was shot in Over-the-Rhine and downtown Cincinnati. Other locations include the Cincinnati neighborhood of Clifton; the Village of Indian Hill; the University of Cincinnati's McMicken Hall; Miami University's Alumni Hall, Upham Hall, Hall Auditorium and the Tau Kappa Epsilon Fraternity House, in Oxford, Ohio; and both the Wexner Center and the Ohio Theater in Columbus, Ohio.

== Reception ==
=== Box office ===
In its opening weekend in North America, Little Man Tate was #6 at the box office, grossing $2.3 million. The film grossed a total of $25 million domestically, against a $10 million budget becoming a commercial success.

=== Critical response ===
The review aggregator website Rotten Tomatoes gives Little Man Tate an approval rating of 71% based on 31 reviews, with an average rating of 6.30/10. On Metacritic, the film has a weighted average score of 71 out of 100 based on 5 reviews, indicating "generally favourable reviews".

Roger Ebert gave the film three and a half stars out of four and commented on how the film's premise is similar to Foster's life, saying; "Little Man Tate is the kind of movie you enjoy watching; it's about interesting people finding out about themselves and as Foster creates this little man who sees a lot and knows a lot but is only gradually beginning to understand a lot, we can hear echoes, perhaps, of a young girl who once found it more interesting to study French than get her picture in the fan magazines."

== The band ==
The English indie rock band, formed in 2005 in Sheffield, was named after this movie.
