= Harry Bakwin =

American pediatrician

- Born: November 19, 1894
- Died: December 25, 1973 (age 79)
- Education: Columbia University College of Physicians and Surgeons
- Occupations: Pediatricia; Professor; Art collector
- Spouse: Ruth Mae Morris
- Children: 4
- Relatives: Edward Morris (father-in-law); Helen Swift Morris (mother-in-law); Muriel Gardiner (sister-in-law); Joseph Buttinger (brother-in-law)

Harry Bakwin (November 19, 1894 – December 25, 1973) was a New York pediatrician, and also a Professor of Pediatrics at New York University.

== Biography ==
Born in 1894 to a Jewish family, Bakwin graduated with a M.D. from Columbia University College of Physicians and Surgeons in 1917. In 1925, Bakwin married Ruth Morris Bakwin, heiress to two Chicago meat-packing fortunes, as the daughter of Edward Morris, son of the founder of Morris & Company; and Helen Swift Morris, the daughter of Gustavus Swift, founder of Swift & Company. Her sister was psychiatrist Muriel Gardiner who was married to the Austrian politician Joseph Buttinger. He and his wife had four children: Edward Bakwin, Michael Bakwin, Barbara Bakwin Rosenthal, and Patricia Bakwin Selch.

== Writing ==
As a pediatrician, Bakwin authored many articles relevant to children, often with his wife. The 1931 Journal of Clinical Investigation paper "Body Build in Infants" compared the external dimensions of sick infants with dimensions in healthy children. Together with his wife, he wrote the widely regarded medical text, Clinical Management of Behavior Disorders in Children. Bakwin and his wife co-authored an early piece on the speech disorder cluttering (also called tachyphemia) in 1952, years before cluttering was commonly discussed. Bakwin observed that clutterers could temporarily overcome their speech defect when they tried to do so.

== The Bakwin Collection ==
Bakwin and his wife began collecting art shortly after their marriage, building up a major collection, ultimately known as the Bakwin Collection. Including works by Van Gogh, Matisse, Cézanne, Gauguin, Modigliani, and Picasso, the collection was assembled during summer vacations take in Europe, and was displayed at the Bakwins' Manhattan town house. Van Gogh's painting, Madame Ginoux, one of six such studies and the version which the artist gave to his brother Theo, was sold at auction in 2006 at Christie's, New York, for more than $40 million (USD).
