= Muriel Gardiner =

American psychiatrist

- Born: November 23, 1901; Chicago, Illinois, U.S.
- Died: February 6, 1985 (aged 83); Princeton, New Jersey, U.S.
- Education: Wellesley College; University of Oxford; University of Vienna
- Occupations: Psychoanalyst; psychiatrist
- Spouse(s): Julian Gardiner (divorced); Joseph Buttinger
- Children: 1
- Parent(s): Edward Morris; Helen Swift Morris
- Relatives: Gustavus Franklin Swift (grandfather); Nelson Morris (grandfather); Ruth Morris Bakwin (sister); Harry Bakwin (brother-in-law); Hal Harvey (grandson)

Muriel Gardiner Buttinger (née Morris; November 23, 1901 – February 6, 1985) was an American psychoanalyst and psychiatrist.

== Early life and career ==
Gardiner was born on November 23, 1901, in Chicago, the daughter of Edward Morris, president of the Morris & Company meat-packing business, and Helen (née Swift) Morris, a member of the family which owned Swift & Company, another meat-packing firm (her parents eventually divorced and her mother remarried British politician and playwright Francis Neilson). Similarly to other writers of the Lost Generation, Gardiner was born into a family of wealth and privilege.

After graduating from Wellesley College in 1922 she traveled to Europe where she lived until the outbreak of World War II. She attended the University of Oxford and then, in 1926, went to what was then still "Red Vienna", hoping to study psychoanalysis with Sigmund Freud. She received a degree in medicine from the University of Vienna and married Joseph Buttinger, leader of the underground wing of the Social Democratic Party of Austria.

After the Social Democratic Party was banned following an armed insurgency against the newly founded Federal State of Austria and Chancellor Engelbert Dollfuss, Gardiner became involved in the covert activities of the Party as it continued in the underground. Using the code name "Mary", she smuggled passports and money and offered her home as a safe house for paramilitaries and dissidents, until fleeing from Nazi Austria to the Third French Republic after the Anschluss. Her former covert activities were described in her memoir Code Name Mary: Memoirs of an American Woman in the Austrian Underground (1983). At the outbreak of World War II on September 1, 1939, Gardiner, Buttinger and their daughter moved to the still neutral United States.

Gardiner edited The Wolf-Man by the Wolf-Man, which documents the case history of Sergei Pankejeff, a member of the Russian nobility who travelled to Vienna to be treated for clinical depression in 1910 and was psychoanalyzed by Freud. Pankejeff, under the code name "der Wolfsmann", became the subject of Freud's History of an Infantile Neurosis. Gardiner met Freud only once, but she had also known Pankejeff very well in Vienna, and Code Name Mary carries a foreword by Freud's daughter, Anna Freud. In 1976, she authored a study of teenage violence called The Deadly Innocents.

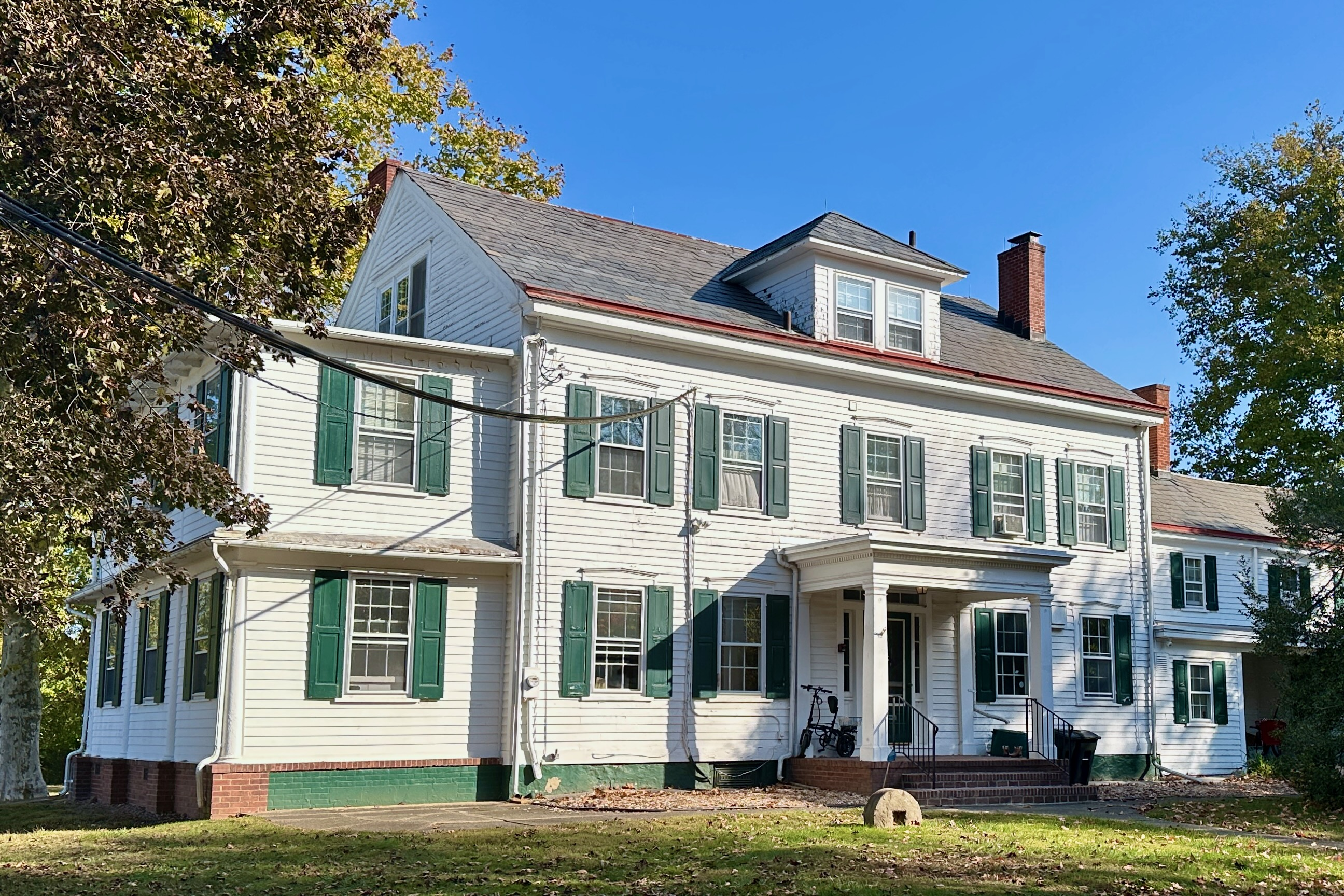
House at Brookdale Farm

Between 1965 and 1984, Gardiner gave a total of 585 acres (2.37 km^{2}) to the Stony Brook-Millstone Watershed Association (now called The Watershed Institute), including Brookdale Farm and two other properties.

In 1983, Gardiner became entangled in the controversy between Mary McCarthy and Lillian Hellman, when she claimed that she was the character called Julia in Hellman's alleged memoirs, Pentimento (1973), and in the movie Julia based on a chapter in that alleged memoir. Hellman, who never met Gardiner, insisted that her friend really was "Julia" and was killed by the Gestapo as described in the story and was someone completely different.

Gardiner wrote that, while she never met Hellman, she had often heard about her from a friend, Wolf Schwabacher, who was Hellman's lawyer. In Gardiner's account, Schwabacher had visited Gardiner in Vienna and, after Muriel Gardiner, Joseph Buttinger, and their daughter moved into their house at Brookdale Farm in Hopewell Township near Pennington, New Jersey, in 1940. The house was divided with the Gardiner-Buttinger family living in one half and Wolf and Ethel Schwabacher in the other for more than ten years. Most people now believe that Hellman wrote a fictional story in her "memoir", based on stories told by Schwabacher about Gardiner's life. Gardiner's editor further cited the unlikelihood that there were two millionaire American women who were medical students and anti-Nazi activists in Vienna during the late 1930s.

== Personal life and death ==
She was briefly married to physician Harold Abramson in 1925. Her second husband was British artist Julian Benedict Orde Gardiner (1903-1982); they had a daughter, Constance, whom she raised in Vienna before sending her to New York City to live with her sister, Dr. Ruth Morris Bakwin, a pediatrician married to Dr. Harry Bakwin. She married Joseph Buttinger before the couple fled Europe in 1939. Muriel Gardiner died of cancer on February 6, 1985, in Princeton, New Jersey, aged 83.

== Legacy ==
- Muriel-Gardiner-Buttinger-Platz in Vienna is named in her honour.
- The Western New England Psychoanalytic Society in New Haven, Connecticut, runs a series of monthly meetings called the Muriel Gardiner Program in Psychoanalysis and the Humanities.
