= Edward Morris (businessman) =

American businessman

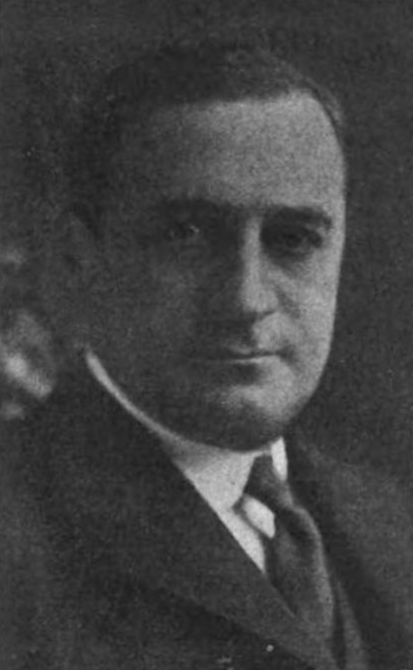
- Born: October 1, 1866; Chicago, Illinois
- Died: November 3, 1913 (aged 47); Chicago, Illinois
- Resting place: Rosehill Cemetery
- Occupation: Meatpacker
- Known for: President of Morris & Company
- Spouse: Helen Swift Morris
- Children: 4 including Muriel Gardiner and Ruth Morris Bakwin
- Parent(s): Nelson Morris; Sarah Vogel Morris
- Relatives: Ira Nelson Morris (brother); Abram M. Rothschild (brother-in-law)

Edward Morris (October 1, 1866 – November 3, 1913) was President of Morris & Company, one of the three main meat-packing companies in Chicago.

== Biography ==
He was born to a Jewish family in Chicago on October 1, 1866, to Sarah (née Vogel) and Nelson Morris. His brother was diplomat Ira Nelson Morris. As president of Morris and Company, Edward Morris was involved in the decision, in 1902, to form the National Packing Co. This holding company was targeted by Arba Seymour Van Valkenburgh under the Elkins Act and eventually broken up in 1912.

== Personal life ==
In 1890, he married Helen Swift, daughter of Gustavus Swift. They had 4 children: Edward Morris, Jr., Nelson Swift Morris (married to French singer Jeanne Aubert), pediatrician Ruth Morris Bakwin (married to pediatrician Harry Bakwin), and psychiatrist, Muriel Morris Gardiner Buttinger (married to Austrian politician Joseph Buttinger). He died on November 3, 1913, in Chicago, Illinois of kidney disease. He was buried at Rosehill Cemetery. In 1917 his widow married Francis Neilson.
