= Swann baronets =

Baronetcy in the Baronetage of the United Kingdom

Escutcheon of the Swann baronets of Prince's Gardens

Sir Charles Schwann, circa 1910

The Schwann, later Swann Baronetcy, of Prince's Gardens in the Royal Borough of Kensington, is a title in the Baronetage of the United Kingdom. It was created on 16 July 1906 for Charles Swann, Liberal Member of Parliament for Manchester North from 1886 to 1918. He was the son of Frederick Schwann, a German merchant who had emigrated to England. Born Charles Schwann, he assumed by Royal licence the surname of Swann in lieu of his patronymic in 1913.

The 2nd Baronet represented Hyde in the House of Commons from 1906 to 1910.

== Schwann, later Swann baronets, of Prince's Gardens (1906) ==
- Sir Charles Ernest Swann, 1st Baronet (1844–1929)
- Sir (Charles) Duncan Swann, 2nd Baronet (1879–1962)
- Sir Anthony Charles Christopher Swann, 3rd Baronet (1913–1991)
- Sir Michael Christopher Swann, 4th Baronet (b. 1941)

The heir apparent is the present holder's son Jonathan Christopher Swann (b. 1966)).

== See also ==
- House of Windsor
- Titles Deprivation Act 1917

Baronetage of the United Kingdom
Preceded by Nixon baronets	Schwann baronets of Prince's Gardens; 16 July 1906	Succeeded by Spicer baronets
