= Bakwin =

Bakwin is a surname. Notable people with the surname include:

- Harry Bakwin (1894–1973), American pediatrician
- Ruth Morris Bakwin (1898–1985), American pediatrician and psychologist
