= Helen Swift Neilson =

American writer and art collector (1869–1945)

- Born: 1869; Barnstable, Massachusetts, U.S.
- Died: 18 June 1945 (aged 76); Chicago, Illinois, U.S.
- Spouse(s): Edward Morris (spouse); Francis Neilson
- Children: Edward Morris, Jr. Nelson Morris; Ruth Morris Bakwin; Muriel Morris Gardiner Buttinger
- Father: Gustavus Franklin Swift
- Family: Ira Nelson Morris (brother-in-law); Nelson Morris (father-in-law)

Helen Swift Neilson (1869 – 18 June 1945) was an American writer and art collector.

== Biography ==
Neilson was the daughter of Annie Maria (née Higgins) and Gustavus Franklin Swift, founder of the meatpacking company Swift & Co. Her first husband was Edward Morris, son of Nelson Morris, the founder of Morris & Company, a competitor to her father. They had four children: Edward Morris, Jr., Nelson Swift Morris, Ruth Morris Bakwin, and Muriel Morris Gardiner Buttinger. In 1913, her husband died, and in 1917, she married British politician and writer Francis Neilson, with whom she founded the weekly paper The Freeman in 1920.

She is perhaps best known for her book about her parents, titled My Father and My Mother.

Neilson died in Chicago, Illinois. She bequeathed several notable paintings to the Metropolitan Museum of Art:

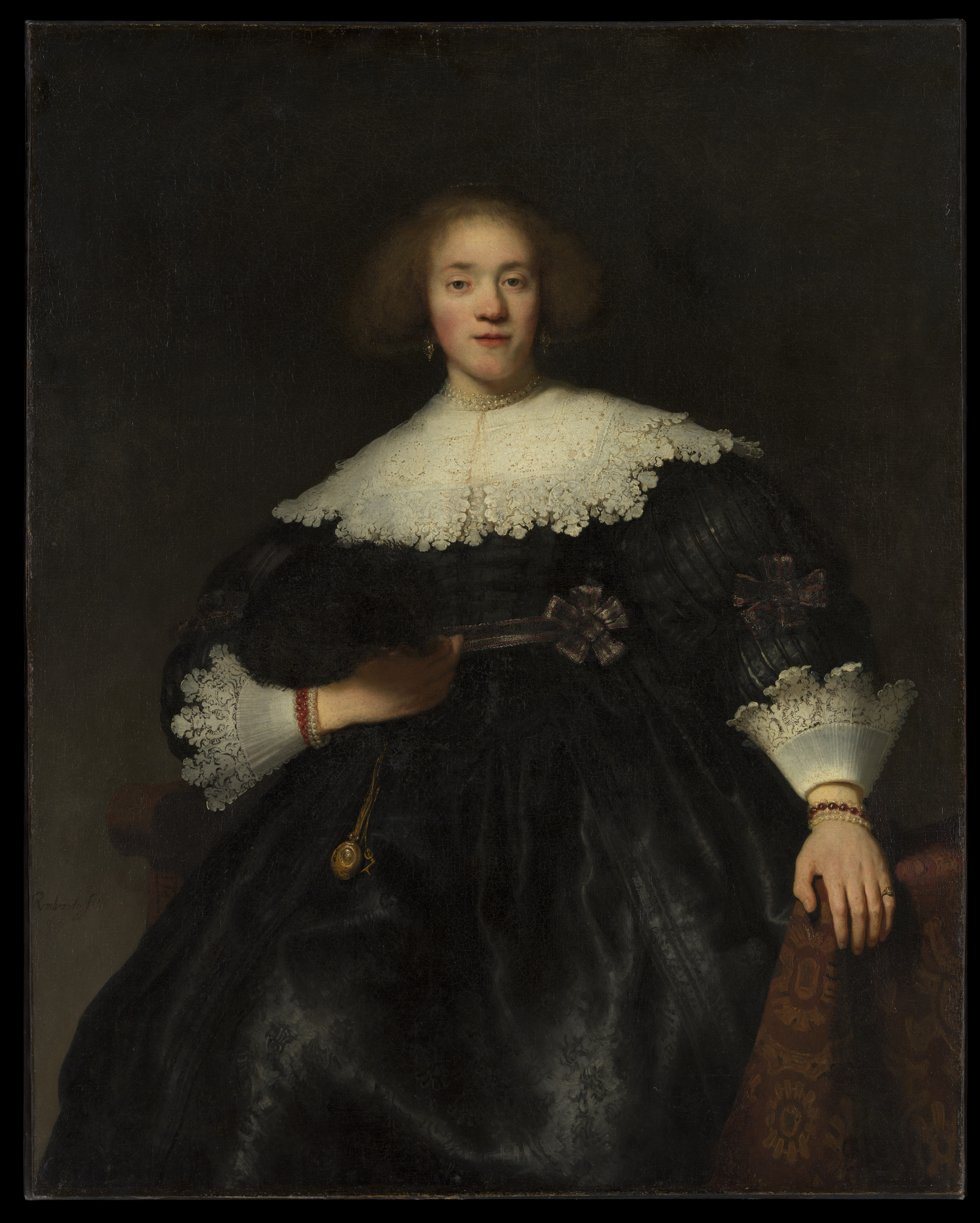
Portrait of a Young Woman with a Fan, by Rembrandt

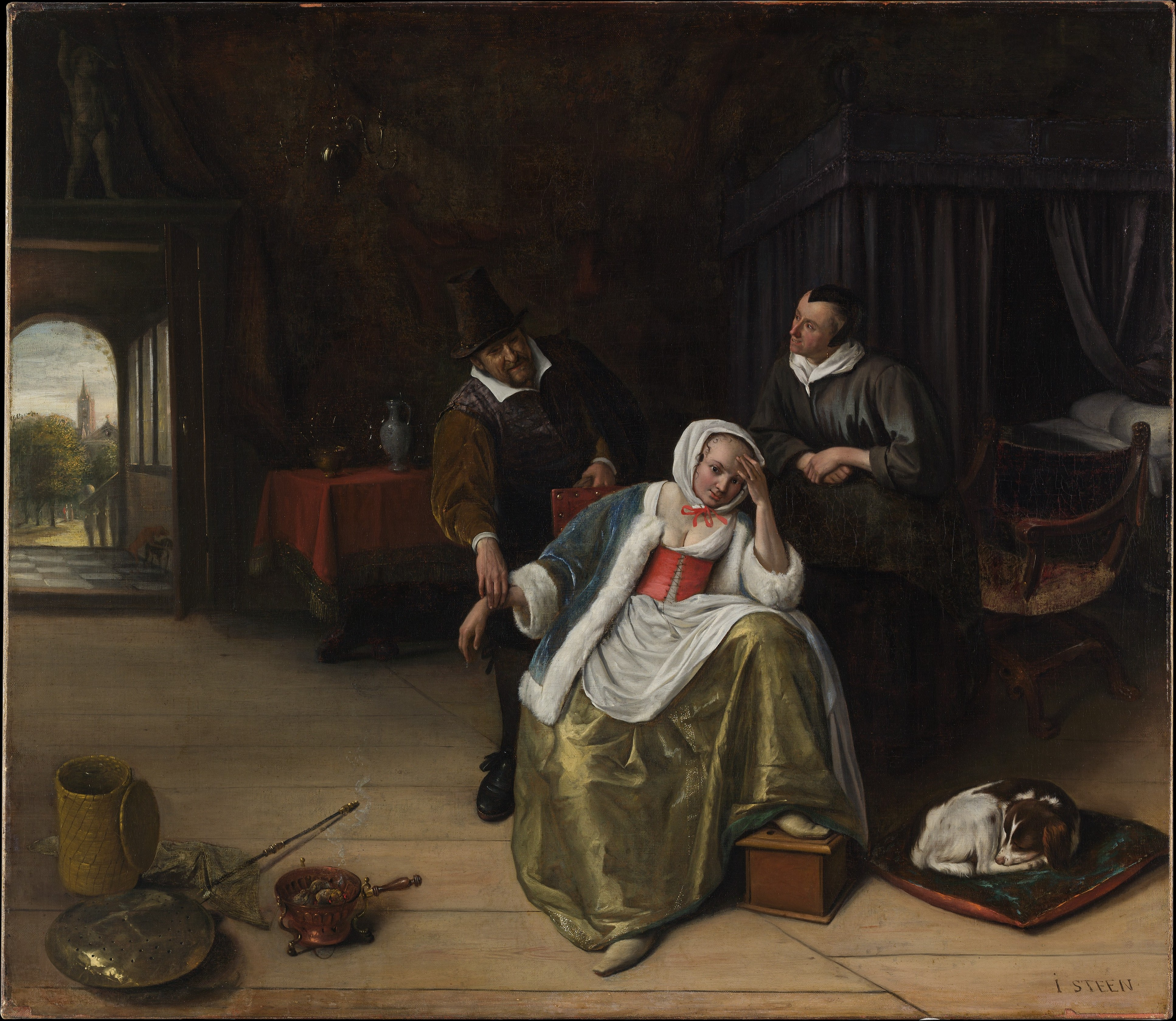
The Lovesick Maiden, by Jan Steen

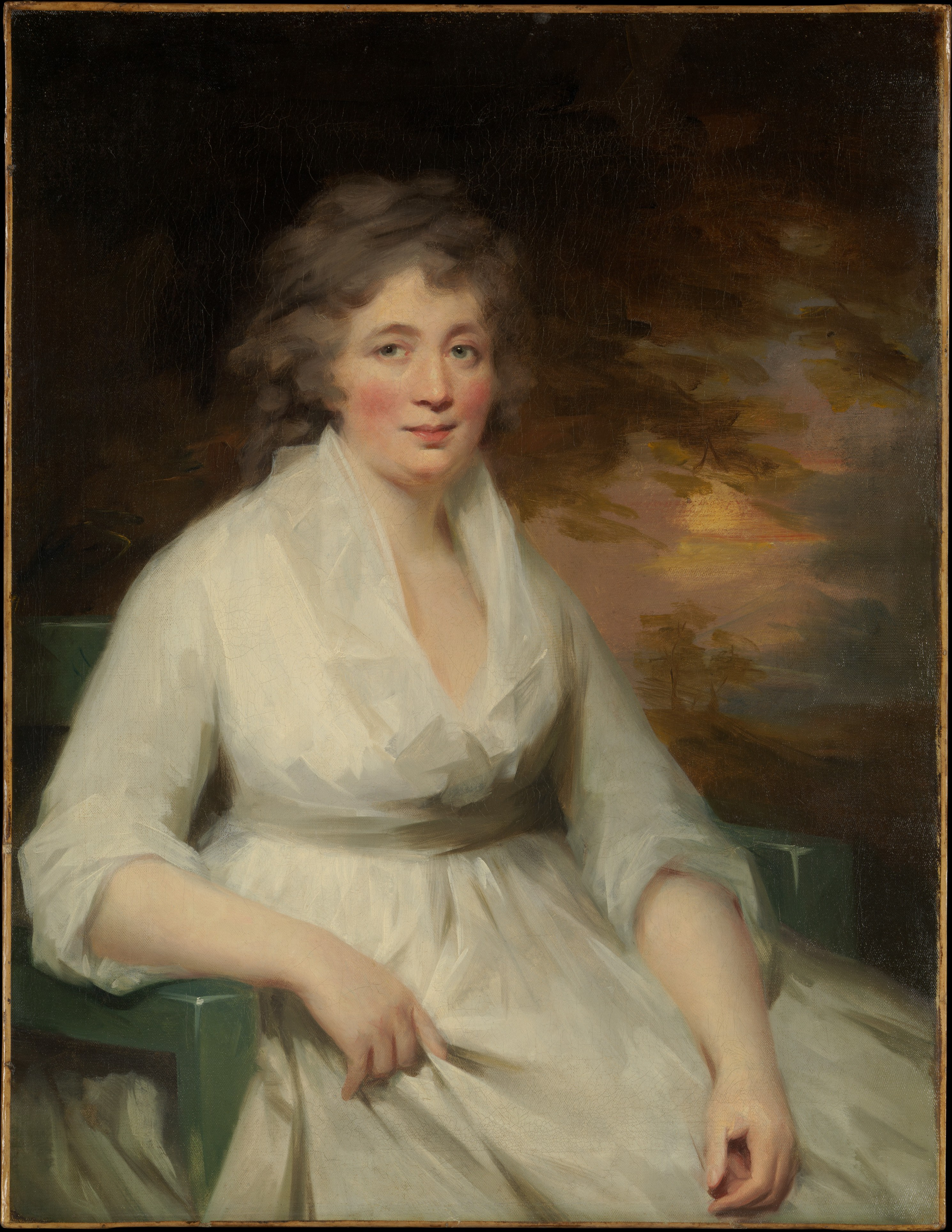
Portrait of Janet Law, by Henry Raeburn

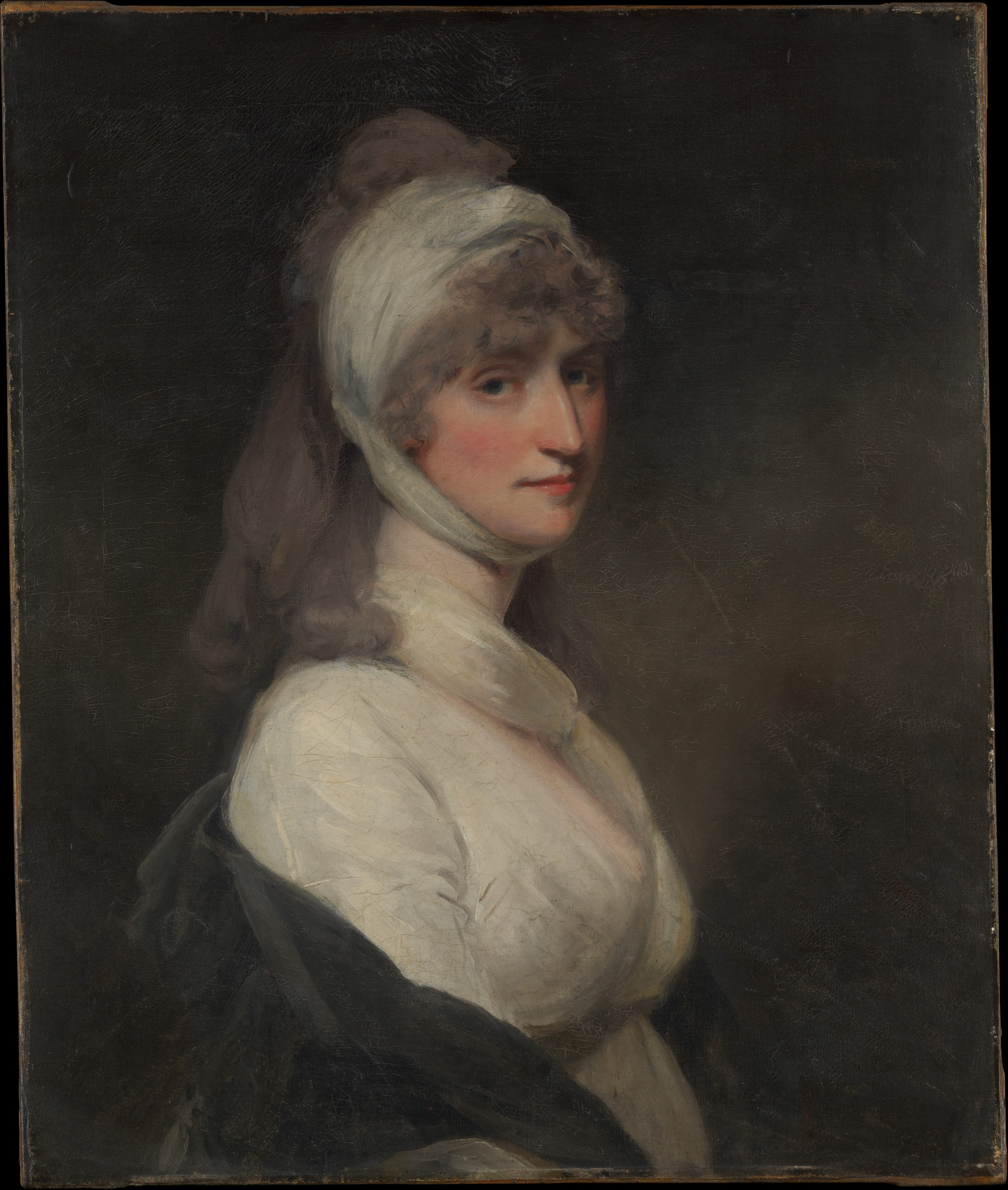
Portrait of Mrs. Thomas Pechell (Charlotte Clavering, died 1841), by John Hoppner

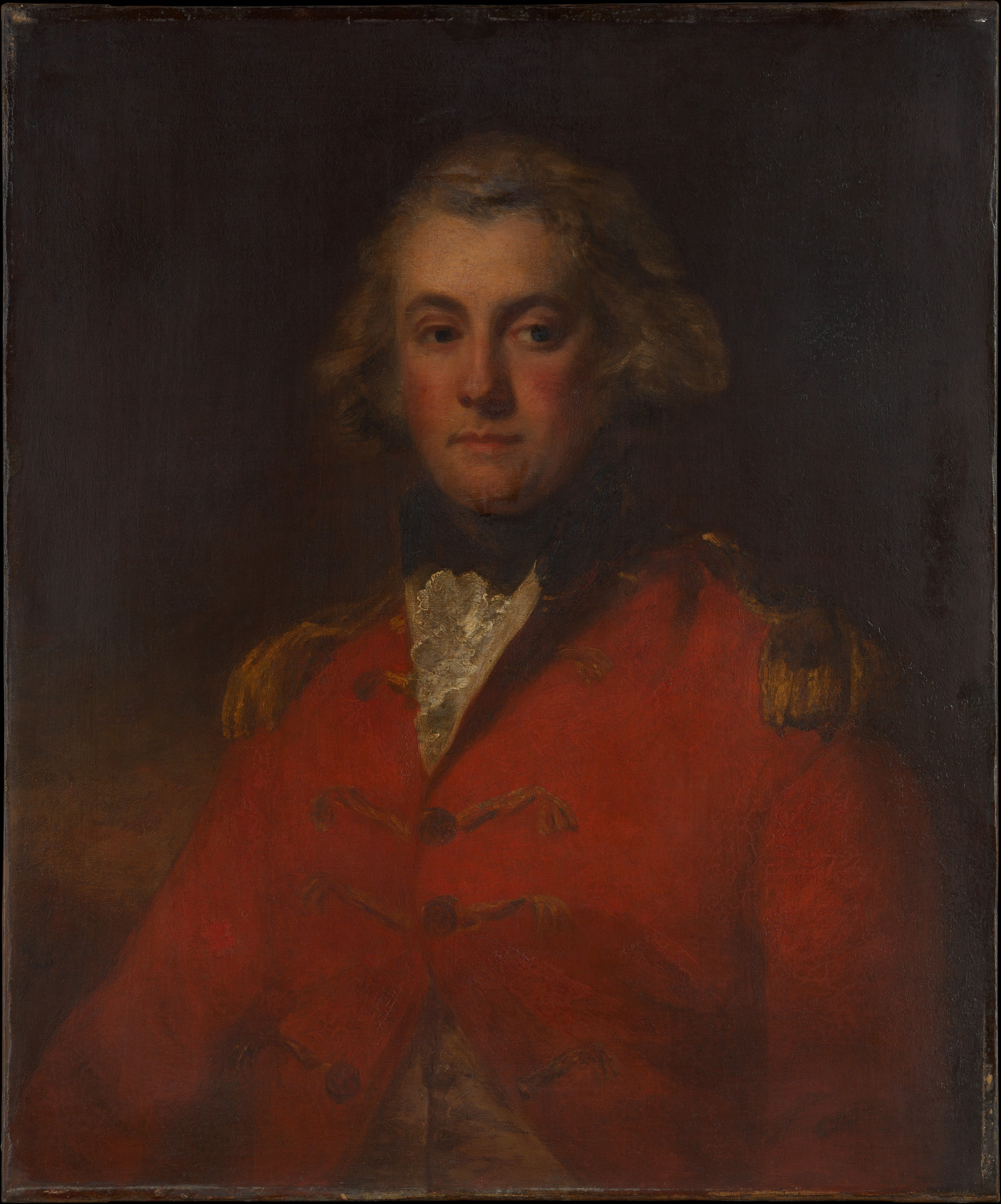
Portrait of Thomas Pechell (1753–1826), by John Hoppner
