= Ruth Morris Bakwin =

American pediatrician

- Born: Ruth Mae Morris; June 3, 1898; Chicago, Illinois
- Died: July 31, 1985 (aged 87); Kodiak, Alaska
- Spouse: Harry Bakwin
- Relatives: Edward Morris (father); Helen Swift Morris (mother); Gustavus Swift (grandfather); Nelson Morris (grandfather); Muriel Gardiner (sister)
- Medical career
- Field: Pediatrics
- Institutions: NYU School of Medicine

Ruth Morris Bakwin (June 3, 1898 – July 31, 1985) was an American pediatrician and child psychologist and the first woman intern at the Fifth Avenue Hospital in New York City (now the New York Medical College). Bakwin and her husband, also a pediatrician, were long associated with New York University School of Medicine.

== Biography ==
Ruth Mae Morris was born in Chicago in 1898. Her parents were both scions of prominent families involved in the meat-packing industry in Chicago: Edward Morris, son of the founder of Morris & Company, Nelson Morris; and Helen Swift Morris, daughter of Gustavus Swift, founder of Swift & Co.

She was educated at Wellesley College and Cornell University Medical School. While at Cornell, Bakwin started a fund to assist students at the school with financial need.

In 1925, Ruth and Harry Bakwin married in Paris. Harry was also a pediatrician, and he had been one of the first physicians to diagnose a patient with autism. While the Bakwins were in postgraduate training in Europe, they took up art appreciation. On a return visit to Europe in the late 1920s, they purchased Vincent van Gogh's 1890 version of L'Arlésienne. The Bakwins befriended several well-known artists, including Diego Rivera and Chaïm Soutine. Ruth Bakwin studied with Anna Freud in Vienna.

Bakwin was a member of the Department of Pediatrics at the New York University Medical School from 1930 until her death. She was also Director of Pediatric Services at the New York Infirmary from 1936 to 1954 and was elected a member of its Board in 1961, and then became a trustee after the Infirmary merged with Beekman Hospital (now the New York Downtown Hospital) in 1979. With her husband, she co-authored several textbooks including the highly regarded Clinical Management of Behavior Disorders in Children (1968).

In 1950, she received the Elizabeth Blackwell Award for her distinguished career in pediatrics from the New York Infirmary. In 1983, she won the Alumnae Achievement Award at Wellesley College.

== Personal life and death ==
She and her husband had four children: Edward Bakwin, Michael Bakwin, Barbara Bakwin Rosenthal, and Patricia Bakwin Selch. While on vacation in 1985 in Kodiak, Alaska, Bakwin died of a heart attack. She was predeceased by her husband in 1973. In 2006 Bakwin's son Edward sold L'Arlésienne by Vincent van Gogh at Christie's in New York for $40.3 million.
