= James Frederick Hutton =

James Frederick Hutton (1826 – 1 March 1890) was a British businessman, colonialist and Conservative politician.

He was the son of W M Hutton and Elizabeth Chapman, and inherited the family business importing palm oil from Africa. Hutton's warehouses were near Piccadilly, Manchester He was for some years the President of the Manchester Chamber of Commerce, and was the inaugural President of the Manchester Geographical Society. He was a fellow of the Royal Geographical Society.

Hutton took a great interest in colonial policy in Africa. In 1876 he was part of a deputation that met with Lord Carnarvon, the Secretary of State for the Colonies to protest against a treaty with Portugal that would have ceded areas along the River Gambia. At the time of the Congo Conference of 1884 he was involved in campaigns against the Portuguese "Pink Map" and to maintain British control of Sierra Leone.

In 1885 he was selected as Conservative candidate for the newly created constituency of Manchester North. He was elected, beating the Liberal, Charles Schwann by 650 votes. He was only a Member of Parliament for eight months, however, losing his seat to Schwann in the 1886 general election. Shortly before losing his seat, he appeared at the Congress of the Chambers of Commerce of the British Empire, promoting the idea of an Anglo-Colonial penny postage union.

In November 1886 Hutton was approached by William Mackinnon, and asked to help organise the Emin Pasha Relief Expedition, led by H M Stanley.

In 1887 Hutton was appointed by the President of the Board of Trade to a committee charged with inquiring into the duties, organisation and arrangements of the Patent Office. In 1887 he was made a member of the organising committee of the Imperial Institute of the United Kingdom, the Colonies and India. The committee were charged with raising funds to build the Institute as memorial to the Golden Jubilee of Queen Victoria. In 1888 he was named as one of the court of directors in the founding charter of the Imperial British East Africa Company.

He died in Cairo, Egypt in March 1890.

Parliament of the United Kingdom
New constituency	Member of Parliament for Manchester North; 1885–1886	Succeeded by Charles Edward Schwann
