= Nelson Morris =

American businessman (1838–1907)

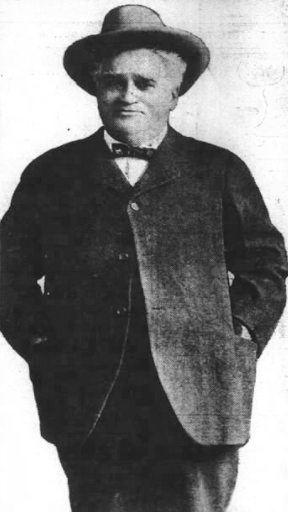
- Born: Moritz Beisinger; January 21, 1838; Hechingen, Kingdom of Württemberg
- Died: August 27, 1907 (aged 69); Chicago, Illinois, U.S.
- Occupation: Meatpacker
- Known for: Founder of Morris & Company
- Spouse: Sarah Vogel
- Children: 5 including Edward Morris; Ira Nelson Morris
- Relatives: Helen Swift Morris (daughter-in-law); Muriel Gardiner (granddaughter); Ruth Morris Bakwin (granddaughter); Abram M. Rothschild (son-in-law)

Nelson Morris (January 21, 1838 – August 27, 1907) was the founder of Morris & Company, one of the three main meat-packing companies in Chicago along with Armour & Company and Swift & Company.

== Biography ==
Morris was born Moritz Beisinger on January 21, 1838, to a Jewish family in Hechingen, Kingdom of Württemberg. His family raised cattle. In 1848, his family's property was confiscated during the German revolutions of 1848–49 and young Moritz was sent to the United States to live with an uncle in New England. In the US, he changed his name to Nelson "Nels" Morris. At the age of 15, he left his uncle to work in a succession of jobs first as a coal miner in Pennsylvania and then on a canal boat which took him to Buffalo and then on a lake ship which took him to Michigan City, Indiana, and finally to Chicago in 1853 where he worked at a stockyard. Leveraging his skills learned by observing his father in southern Germany, he became very successful as a cattle trader which allowed him to buy a slaughterhouse and butcher shop; and eventually a lucrative relationship with the Union Army during the American Civil War. His business continued to grow and by the 1880s, Morris & Company had over 60 buildings in Chicago employing 3,700 and slaughtering 5,000 cattle, 10,000 pigs, 6,000 sheep, and 1,000 calves per day. At the time of his death, company sales were $100 million and had 100 branches throughout the country.

Morris served on various boards. In 1872, he was named as the first Jewish director at the First National Bank of Chicago; he also served as a director at the Drovers Bank which serviced the stockyards.

== Personal life ==
In 1863, he married Sarah Vogel (born 1852 in Chicago), who was also Jewish. They had five children: diplomat Ira Nelson Morris; Edward Morris (married to Helen Swift, daughter of Gustavus Swift, and father of Muriel Gardiner and Ruth Morris Bakwin); Herbert Morris (who died suddenly in 1898); Augusta Morris Rothschild (married to retailer Abram M. Rothschild and later to retailer Maurice L. Rothschild); and Maude Morris Schwab (married to Henry C. Schwab). He died on August 27, 1907. His wife was killed on September 16, 1909, in an automobile accident at Fontainbleau, France.
