= Ira Nelson Morris =

American politician (1875–1942)

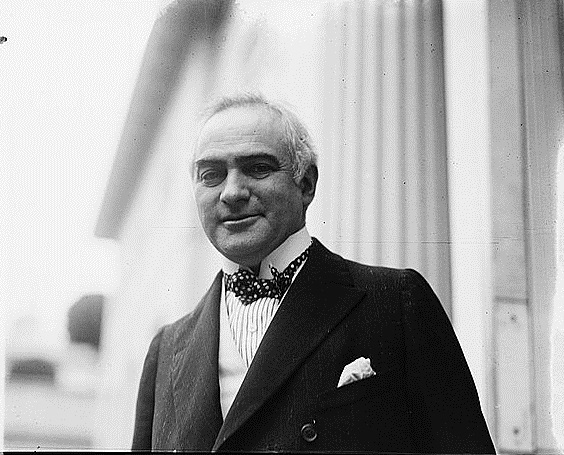

Minister of Sweden
- In office July 13, 1914 – April 3, 1923
- President: Woodrow Wilson; Warren G. Harding
- Succeeded by: Robert Woods Bliss

Commissioner general to Italy
- In office 1913–1913
- President: Woodrow Wilson

Personal details
- Born: March 8, 1875 Chicago, Illinois, US
- Died: January 15, 1942 (aged 66) Chicago, Illinois, US
- Resting place: Rosehill Cemetery and Mausoleum
- Spouse: Constance Lily Rothschild
- Children: 2, including Ira Victor Morris
- Parents: Nelson Morris (father); Sarah Vogel Morris (mother)
- Relatives: Edward Morris (brother); Abram M. Rothschild (brother-in-law); Edita Morris (daughter-in-law)
- Education: Phillips Academy (1892); Sheffield Scientific School (Yale University) (1895)

Ira Nelson Morris (March 8, 1875 – January 15, 1942) was an American author and diplomat appointed the United States Minister to Sweden, serving from 1914 to 1923. In 1913 he was appointed the Commissioner General to Italy, on behalf of the Panama–Pacific International Exposition.

== Early years ==
Ira Morris was born March 8, 1875, in Chicago, Illinois, to Sarah (née Vogel) and Nelson Morris. His father was a meat-packing executive and founder of Morris & Company. His brother was Edward Morris. He attended Phillips Academy, in Andover, Massachusetts, graduating in 1892. He then attended Sheffield Scientific School, part of Yale University, graduating in 1895.

== Career ==
After graduation, Morris worked for his father in the meat-packing industry. He became involved in social problems and philanthropy, and was a member of the Chicago Peace Society and a foreign delegate to the American Peace Conference. After leaving his father's company he served as the president of Union Rending Company; treasurer of Consumer's Cotton Oil Company; secretary of Fairbank Canning Company; and director of National Packing Company, the National Stockyards of St. Louis, and A.M. Rothschild and Company.

In 1913, he was appointed the Commissioner General to Italy, where he helped the Italian government gain representation at the Panama–Pacific International Exposition. On July 13, 1914, he was appointed the United States Minister to Sweden, a position he held until April 3, 1923.

== Personal life ==
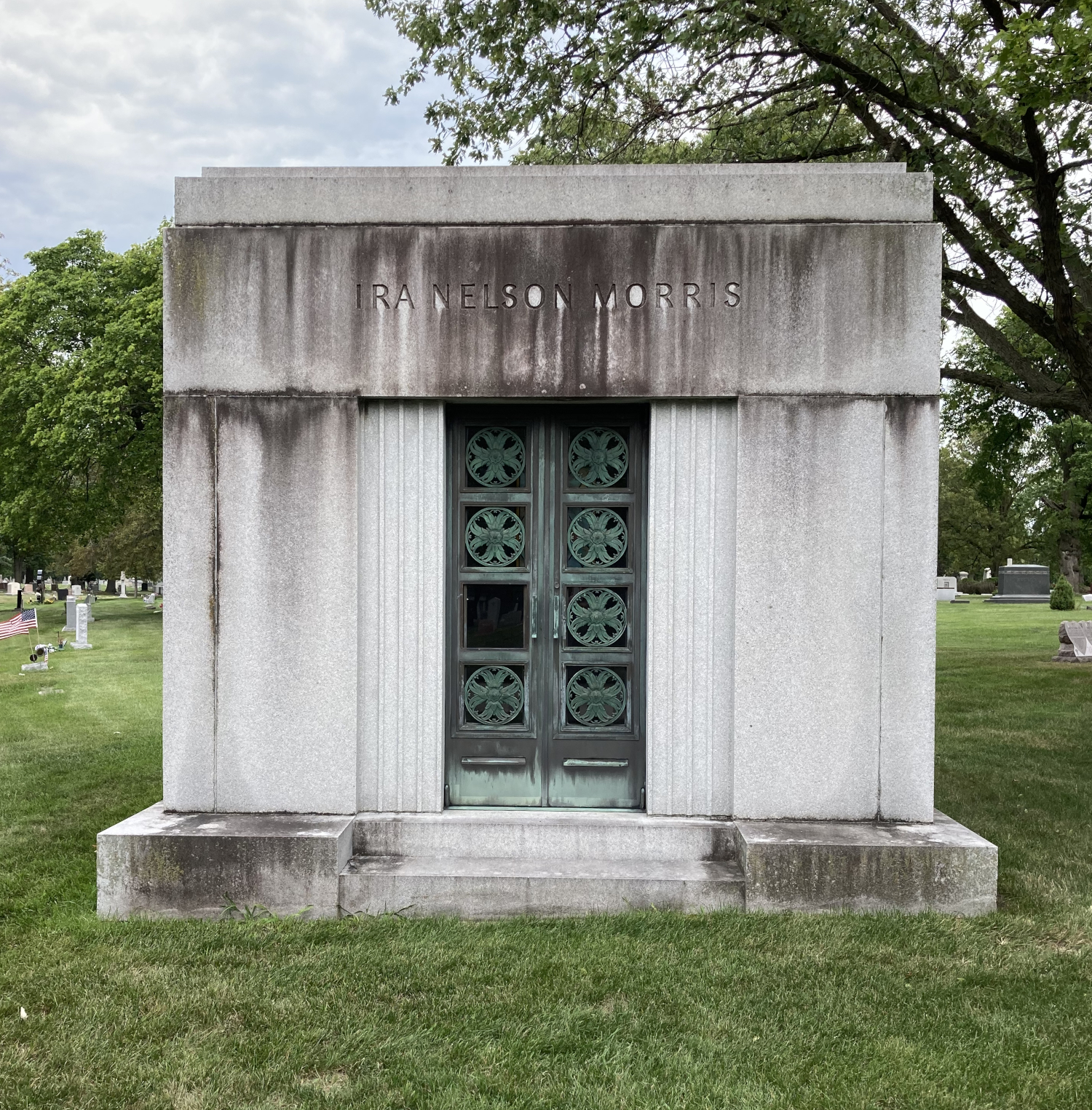
Morris mausoleum at Rosehill Cemetery

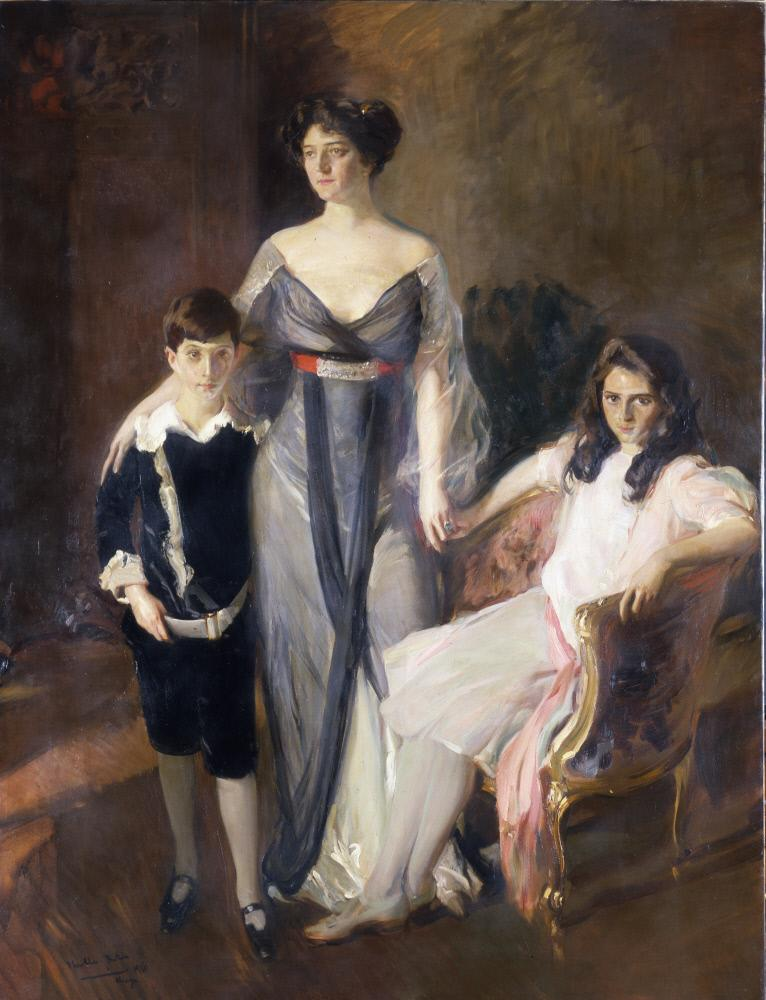
Morris's wife and two children in a 1911 portrait painting by Joaquin Sorolla.

In 1898, he married Constance Lily Rothschild, daughter of Victor Henry Rothschild, in New York City; they had two children, Constance Irene Morris and author Ira Victor Morris.

In 1921, while sailing to New York, on the Scandinavian-American liner United States, Morris saved the life of 19-year-old Ellen Neilson, of Brooklyn, in mid-ocean, when she was nearly washed overboard.

Morris died in Chicago on January 15, 1942. His will included $150,000 for the construction of a mausoleum at Rosehill Cemetery, where he was interred.

== Namesake ==
The World War II Liberty Ship SS Ira Nelson Morris was named in his honor.

== Bibliography ==
- "Ira Nelson Morris, Second Jewish Ambassador". Daily Jewish Courier. July 7, 1914. Archived from the original on November 16, 2017.
- "Morris, Nelson".
- "Ira Nelson Morris (1875–1942)".
- Ingham, John N. (1983). Biographical Dictionary of American Business Leaders, Volume 2. Greenwood Publishing Group. ISBN 0313239088.
- "American Consular Bulletin, Volume 4". American Consular Association. 1922.
- Williams, Greg H. (July 25, 2014). The Liberty Ships of World War II: A Record of the 2,710 Vessels and Their Builders, Operators and Namesakes, with a History of the Jeremiah O'Brien. McFarland. ISBN 978-1476617541.
- A Thousand American Men of Mark To-day. 1917. p. 142 – via Google Books.
- "Bulk of Estate of Ira N. Morris Left to Family". Chicago Tribune. January 23, 1942. p. 24 – via Newspapers.com.
