= Morris and Company =

Morris and Company may refer to:

- Morris & Company, a Chicago meatpacking company
- Morris & Co., a decorative arts firm founded by William Morris
