= Abram M. Rothschild =

American businessman (1853–1902)

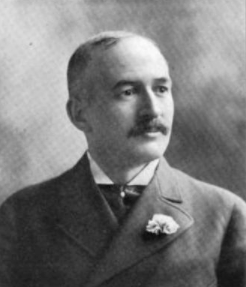
- Born: 1853; Nordstetten, Kingdom of Württemberg
- Died: July 28, 1902 (aged 52); Chicago, Illinois, US
- Occupation: Businessman
- Known for: Founder of A.M. Rothschild Company
- Spouses: Augusta Morris; Maurice L. Rothschild
- Children: 1
- Relatives: Nelson Morris (father-in-law); Edward Morris (brother-in-law); Ira Nelson Morris (brother-in-law)

Signature
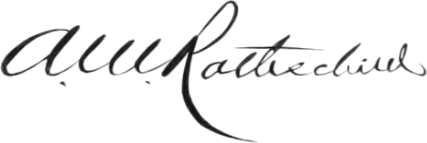

Abram M. Rothschild or A.M. Rothschild (1853 – July 28, 1902) was an American businessman who founded the A.M. Rothschild Company.

== Biography ==
Abram M. Rothschild was born to a Jewish family in 1853 in Nordstetten (today a district of Horb am Neckar), Kingdom of Württemberg, the youngest child in a family of thirteen. In 1856, he immigrated to Davenport, Iowa where he joined his brother, Emmanuel, who had founded a retail store. The store was renamed to E. Rothschild and Bro. After the Great Chicago Fire, the brothers established a branch operation on the near west side of Chicago which soon morphed it into a clothing manufacturing operation. In 1881, they liquidated their retail operations and went solely into clothing manufacturing with their company, the Palace Clothing Company; Abram served as president and built production facilities in a number of cities. He served as a director of the Columbian Exposition and Vice President of the National Bank of the Republic. In 1895, he built a retail store under his name, A.M. Rothschild Company, with his father-in-law Nelson Morris and his brother-in-laws Edward Morris and Ira Nelson Morris as silent partners. It became one of the largest retail stores in Chicago.

== Personal life ==
In 1882, he married Augusta Morris, daughter of Nelson Morris, the founder of the Chicago meatpacking company Morris & Company; they had one child, Melville Nelson Rothschild. Rothschild committed suicide by revolver on July 28, 1902, in Chicago. After his death, his wife married his cousin, Maurice L. Rothschild.
