= Lady Elizabeth Swann =

British social activist

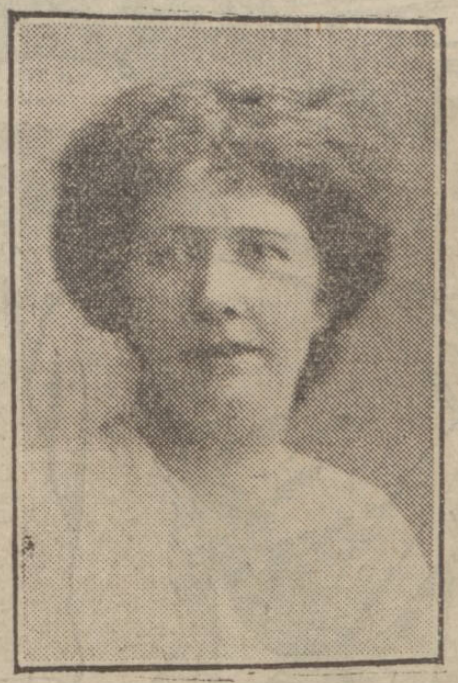
- Born: Elizabeth Duncan; 1855; Manchester, England
- Died: 14 April 1914 (aged 58–59); Princes Gardens, Knightsbridge, London, United Kingdom
- Occupation: Social activist
- Spouse: Sir Charles Ernest Swann (m. 1876)
- Children: 5 (including Charles Duncan)

Lady Elizabeth Swann (previously Schwann, née Duncan; 1855 – 14 April 1914) was a British social activist, philanthropist, and advocate for trade unionism, women's suffrage, and the development of midwifery. She was also an important figure in the development of organised humanism and the Ethical movement in Britain. She was the wife of Liberal Party politician Sir Charles Ernest Swann MP.

In 1896, she was President of the inaugural Annual Congress of the Union of Ethical Societies, which eventually became Humanists UK. Humanists UK describes this as an "equivalent role" to the position of President of Humanists UK, which was created in 1919. In this light, she can be considered the first President of Humanists UK.

== Life ==
Elizabeth Swann was born in Manchester, the third daughter of David Duncan. She married Charles Ernest Swann (then 'Schwann'), and the couple had four sons and one daughter: Charles Duncan, Harold, Laurence Averil, Geoffrey, and Elizabeth Kathleen Mildred.

Described as 'full of enthusiasm for good causes', Swann became actively involved in a number of progressive organisations, including the Women's Liberal Federation. Swann was the first Honorary Secretary of the Manchester and Salford Women's Trade Union Council, established in 1895. The previous year, she had chaired a meeting of the Manchester and Salford Federation of Women Workers, and remained active in encouraging trade unionism.

In 1895, Swann was one of a group of woman who - as the Association for the Compulsory Registration of Midwives - petitioned for a bill to regulate midwifery. The Association for the Compulsory Registration of Midwives and the Midwives Registration Association were organisations founded in 1893, and 'cooperated in the campaign for definitive legislation' in the practice of midwifery. The Midwives Act came into force in 1902. In 1904, Swann was signatory to an open letter requesting financial support for the training of midwives from, and working with, women of the working class. The association aimed:

to assist, by means of loans, grants, and free training, the education of the midwives whose services are so urgently demanded by the law and for public safety.

== Death and legacy ==
Elizabeth Swann died at home in London on 14 April 1914. An obituary in the Manchester Guardian noted that as the wife of an MP:

she entered with exceptional ardour into all movements that concerned the welfare of the district. She was a good speaker, and by her public addresses, no less than by her attractive personality, she contributed much to her husband’s success in the constituency.

The Manchester Daily Citizen, similarly reported that:

In all causes, whether social or political, Lady Swann displayed the utmost zeal and enthusiasm, and it was always believed that the great help she gave her husband, together with her personal popularity, contributed in no small degree to his political success.
