= Francis Neilson =

British-born American actor, playwright, and director

Francis Neilson MP

Member of Parliament for Hyde
- In office 1910–1916
- Preceded by: Charles Duncan Schwann
- Succeeded by: Owen Jacobsen

Personal details
- Born: 26 January 1867 Birkenhead, England
- Died: 13 April 1961 Port Washington, Long Island, New York.
- Party: Liberal
- Spouse: Helen Swift

Francis Neilson (26 January 1867 – 13 April 1961) was an accomplished British-born American actor, playwright and stage director. He was also a political figure and former member of the British House of Commons. An avid lecturer, Neilson was an author of more than 60 books, plays and opera librettos and the most active leader in the Georgist movement.

== Early life ==
Born Francis Butters, the eldest of nine siblings, in Claughton Road, Birkenhead, England, he was the son of a Shropshire father, Francis Turley Butters and a Scottish mother from Dundee, Isabella Neilson Hume. He attended the Liverpool Institute for Boys. Several accounts explain that because of his large family, Neilson left school at the age of fourteen and moved to the United States at the age of eighteen. Nevertheless, the British Census of 1881 records the Butters' household as having 12 people, including 8 children and two maids. The census also records Francis Butters (Neilson's father) as a restaurant keeper.

== Move to US ==
In the United States, after arriving in New York City, and paying fifteen dollars for a hansom cab ride from the docks to his guest house, Neilson worked several odd jobs which included a longshoreman, a labourer in Central Park (years later he lived at the Savoy-Plaza Hotel, overlooking that park), and some clerical work. After meeting an African-American man surnamed Johnson, who because of his colour worked as a porter despite his college degree, Neilson became fascinated with education and at times "…went hungry to buy books". This fascination led him to Henry George, of whom he became a devoted follower.

During his stay in the United States, he married Catherine O'Gorman; they had two daughters, Isabel and Marion. Isabel Neilson, an accomplished sculptor, married Prince Hermann of Saxe-Weimar-Eisenach, Count of Ostheim, in 1932 and became Countess of Ostheim, and Marion Neilson married Captain Hugh Melville, Sam Browne's Cavalry.

== Theatre and opera ==
Neilson's first success came in the following years after his discovery of Henry George's teachings, where he became well known and respected for his writing, acting, and directing. He provided Victor Herbert with a libretto for Prince Ananias commissioned by the theater company The Bostonians which debuted in 1894. The Internet Broadway Database, records him as a director of The Little Princess in January 1903, first at the Criterion Theatre and later at the Savoy Theatre; and as the playwright of A Butterfly on The Wheel in January 1912, at the 39th Street Theatre.

In New York, he befriended director Anton Seidl who took him to Germany and introduced him to Richard Wagner's family in Bayreuth. This led him out of the United States and back to London. He came back to London as a stage director for Charles Frohman at the Duke of York's Theatre. Later Neilson was invited to direct the national opera at Covent Garden, which he remodelled completely in 1900. The first opera to be produced there was Puccini's Tosca. Puccini himself was at the theatre supervising the production. The encounter of the two men triggered an interest that took Neilson to invite Puccini to see a private performance of the play Madame Butterfly, playing then at the Duke of York's Theatre. Puccini later requested Neilson to direct the opera at La Scala in Milan; however, this never came to pass due to Neilson's other commitments.

== Political career ==
In the early 1900s, he began his pursuit of politics. His first bid for a parliamentary seat was for the Newport Division of Shropshire in 1906; he lost to the Conservative incumbent, William Kenyon-Slaney, by a margin of 176 votes. He was also unsuccessful in the 1908 Newport by-election.

He was elected as Member of Parliament for the constituency of Hyde in Cheshire in 1910. During his time in parliament, he was well acquainted with both Prime Ministers: Asquith and Lloyd George. Interested in radical politics, he entered in the progress of the Land Values Movement.

His multiple contributions to the liberal agenda made him frequent the Liberal Headquarters, at Parliament Street, and tour the country giving speeches in support of Liberal Party candidates. He resigned from parliament in 1916 after his pacifist beliefs conflicted with the First World War.

== Return to US ==
He returned to the United States, where he became a citizen in 1921 and began pursuing his writing career.

In the US, he met Helen Swift, an heiress of the Swift Meat Packing Business and the widow of Edward Morris, President of Morris & Company, another meat packing company. They were married in 1917. Together, they endowed many charities, and contributed to many institutions, including the University of Chicago, Ripon College, Metropolitan Museum of Art in New York, the Archaeological Institute of America, the Liverpool Cathedral, and Boston Museum of Fine Arts.

== Author ==
His antiwar book How Diplomats Make War (1915) went through several printings and translations. He went on to write over sixty books, along with many other forms of writing such as articles, plays, and an opera. Neilson co-edited a journal of opinion and literary criticism, titled The Freeman between 1920 and 1924.

== Legacy ==
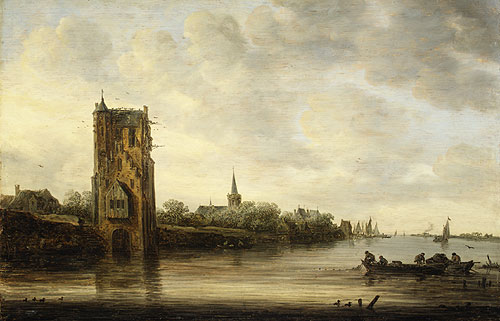
Jan van Goyen The Pelkus Gate near Utrecht (1640); donated to the Metropolitan Museum of Art

In 1935, as President of the Chicago Chapter of the Archaeological Institute of America and in co-ordination with the University of Liverpool, he organised and endowed an archaeological expedition to the Near East, to research lands of biblical time. Archaeologist John Garstang, at the age of sixty, was enthusiastically in charge of the excavations, with much success at the site of the port of Mersin in southern Turkey.

On October 6, 1949, the Francis Neilson Trust Fund was founded "for the promotion and encouragement of education in the cultural arts and sciences among the choirboys and members of the Cross Guild under the age of twenty one and for the costs and expenses in the promotion of special services sanctioned by the Dean."

A few years before his death, Neilson lost his sight. He was assisted in writing his last book, Ur to Nazareth, by his literary secretary, K. Phyllis Evans. Neilson also wrote a two-volume autobiography, My Life in Two Worlds.

Neilson was a benefactor of the Metropolitan Museum of Art, to which he donated antiquities and several paintings, including A Winter Carnival in a Small Flemish Town, Portrait of a Man, Possibly George Frederick Handel, and The Pelkus Gate near Utrecht. Neilson's late wife, Helen Swift Neilson, had bequeathed Portrait of a Young Woman with a Fan, by Rembrandt, for which she had paid $250,000 in 1930; Rembrandt Harmensz (Dutch, 1606–1669); the Portrait of Mrs. Thomas Pechell, and 1799. The Boston Museum of Fine Arts was given John Singer Sargent's painting A Capriote.

Liverpool Cathedral also received support from Neilson in the form of a collection of Organ and Choral Works which he sponsored; the organ at the cathedral also bears his name. The Francis Neilson Trust supports music and choristers at the cathedral.

== Death ==
Francis Neilson died, aged 94, on 13 April 1961 in Port Washington, Long Island, New York. He was cremated and his remains interred at Liverpool Cathedral.

== Publications ==
- How Diplomats Make War, 1915
- Duty to Civilization, 1921
- The Eleventh Commandment, 1933
- Man at the Crossroads, 1938
- The Tragedy of Europe (5 vols.), 1940–1945
- In Quest of Justice, 1944
- Makers of War, 1950
- My Life in Two Worlds, 1952
- The Churchill Legend, 1954
- From Ur to Nazareth, 1960
- Control from the Top, 1933.
- Sociocratic Escapades, 1934.
- Modern Man and the Liberal Arts, 1947

== Opera librettos and plays ==
- La Vivandiere (1893; with music by Victor Herbert)
- Prince Ananias (1894, with music by Victor Herbert)
- Manabozo (1899; composed for Anton Seidl)
- The Bath Road (1902) – a romantic comedy in three acts
- The Crucible (1911) – a drama in three acts
- A Butterfly on The Wheel (1911) – a drama in four acts
- The Sin-Eaters Hallowe'en (1924) -, a fantasy play in one act and two scenes
- A Mixed Foursome (1924) – a comedy in three acts
- The Impossible Philanthropist (1924) – a comedy in four acts
- The Day Before Commencement (1925) – a comedy in four acts
- The Queen Nectaria (1927) – a fantasy in four acts
- Le Braiser De Sang (1929) – a drama in two acts; produced in Paris

== Novels ==
- Madame Bohemia, 1900
- The Wise, 1903
- Ralph Voyce, 1913
- A Strong Man's House, 1916
- The House of the Big Yard, 1936

Parliament of the United Kingdom
Preceded by Duncan Schwann	Member of Parliament for Hyde; 1910–1916	Succeeded by Owen Jacobsen
