= Duncan Swann =

British barrister, journalist, author and politician

Member of Parliament for Hyde
- In office 1906-January 1910

Personal details
- Born: 27 January 1879
- Died: 10 March 1962 (aged 83)
- Political party: Liberal
- Spouse: Dorothy Johnson (m. 1909)
- Children: 2
- Parent: Charles Schwann (father)
- Education: Balliol College, Oxford

Sir Charles Duncan Swann, 2nd Baronet (27 January 1879 – 10 March 1962) was a British barrister, journalist, author and Liberal politician.

== Biography ==
He was the eldest son of Charles Edward Schwann and Elizabeth Duncan. His grandfather was Mr J F Schwann, originally of Frankfurt, Germany.

Schwann was educated at Eton College and Balliol College, Oxford, graduating in 1901. He began a career in journalism, serving on the staff of the Bolton Evening News and the Star and Evening News in London. In 1904 he was called to the bar at the Inner Temple.

At the 1906 general election he was elected as Liberal MP for Hyde, defeating the sitting Conservative member Edward Chapman. Schwann only served one term in parliament, retiring in 1910.

He married Dorothy Margaret Johnson in 1909, and they had two sons.

In 1913 his father, member of parliament for Manchester North, obtained a royal licence for himself and his issue changing the family surname to Swann. On the death of his father in 1929, he succeeded to his baronetcy, created in 1906.

He was the author of a number of works of fiction and humour including The Magic of the Hill : a Romance of Montmartre (1911), The Book of a Bachelor (1912), Molyneux of Mayfair (1912), A Villa in the South (1919), Swans Down (1922) and The Book of a Benedict (1923).

Parliament of the United Kingdom
Preceded by Edward Chapman	Member of Parliament for Hyde; 1906–1910	Succeeded by Francis Neilson
Baronetage of the United Kingdom
Preceded by Charles Ernest Swann	Baronet (of Prince's Gardens); 1929 – 1962	Succeeded by Anthony Charles Christopher Swann
