= The Watershed Institute =

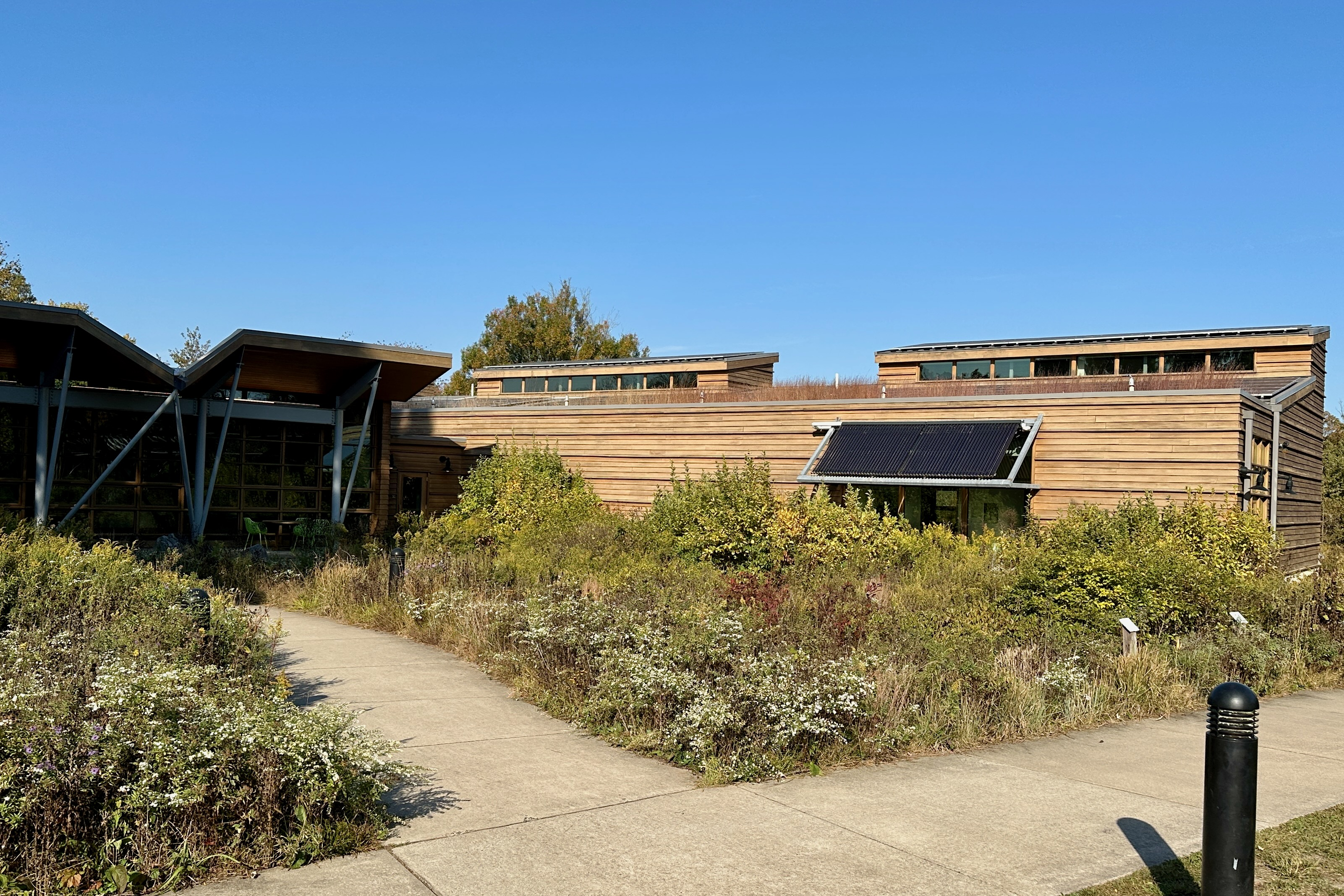
- Watershed Center for Environmental Advocacy, Science, and Education
- Founded: 1949
- Headquarters: 31 Titus Mill Road, Pennington, Hopewell Township, Mercer County, New Jersey
- Region served: Central New Jersey

The Watershed Institute, formerly known as the Stony Brook–Millstone Watershed Association, is a New Jersey nonprofit organization devoted to promoting and protecting the watersheds of central New Jersey's Stony Brook and Millstone River, along with associated natural resources and beauty.

== History ==
Claiming to be central New Jersey's first environmental group, it was established in 1949. The organization promotes and advocates conservation and restoration of natural habitats, collects data on environmental conditions in its watersheds, and provides environmental education through numerous programs.

The organization is centered on its 950-acre nature reserve in Hopewell Township, Mercer County, near Pennington, which includes portions of Stony Brook, Wargo pond, over ten miles of trails, the seasonal Kate Gorrie Butterfly House, and the LEED-platinum Watershed Center for Environmental Advocacy, Science, and Education.

The Watershed Institute hiking trails are typically open to the public from dawn to dusk, with exceptions occurring during hunting season and days after severe weather events. The trails include the 2.2 mile Stony Brook trail (on the east side of the preserve), the 6 mile Watershed trail (spanning the whole reserve and going North to South), the 1.6 mile Farm/History trail (on the west side), and the 2.5 mile Meadow/Pond trail (circling Wargo pond).

== Farmstead ==
- Drake Farmstead/Brookdale Farm
- U.S. National Register of Historic Places
- U.S. Historic district
- New Jersey Register of Historic Places
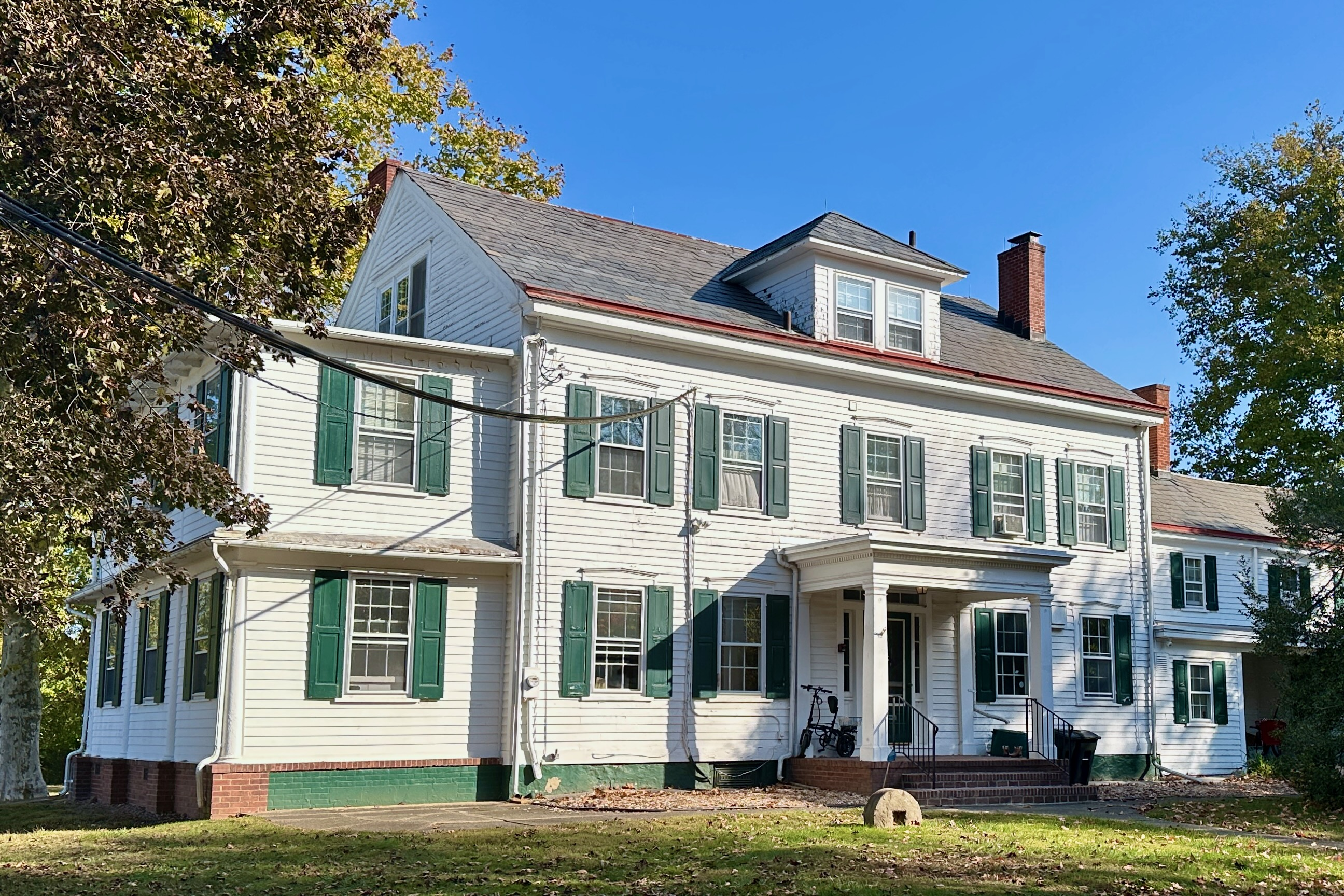
- Farmhouse in 2024

- Location within Mercer County, New Jersey Location within New Jersey Location within the United States
- Location: 31 Titus Mill Road, Pennington, Hopewell Township, Mercer County, New Jersey
- Coordinates: 40°21′04″N 74°46′12″W
- Area: 71 acres (29 ha)
- NRHP reference No.: 100010797
- NJRHP No.: 5617

Significant dates
- Added to NRHP: September 16, 2024
- Designated NJRHP: October 3, 2023

The Andrew and Hannah Drake Farmstead, also known as Drake Farmstead and Brookdale Farm, is a 71-acre (29 ha) historic district at the reserve. The farmstead was added to the National Register of Historic Places on September 16, 2024, for its significance in architecture and social history. It includes 7 contributing buildings, 2 contributing sites, and 1 contributing structure.

The farmhouse was once the home of Dr. Muriel Gardiner Buttinger, a noted author and psychologist, from 1940 until 1965. The oldest part of the farmhouse was built around 1780. The main part was built around 1830 with Greek Revival style by Andrew Drake. The main barn, a gable-roof, timber-frame English barn, was built in phases, one around 1780, and another around 1830. The wellhouse was built around 1880 and features a steel-vaned windmill.

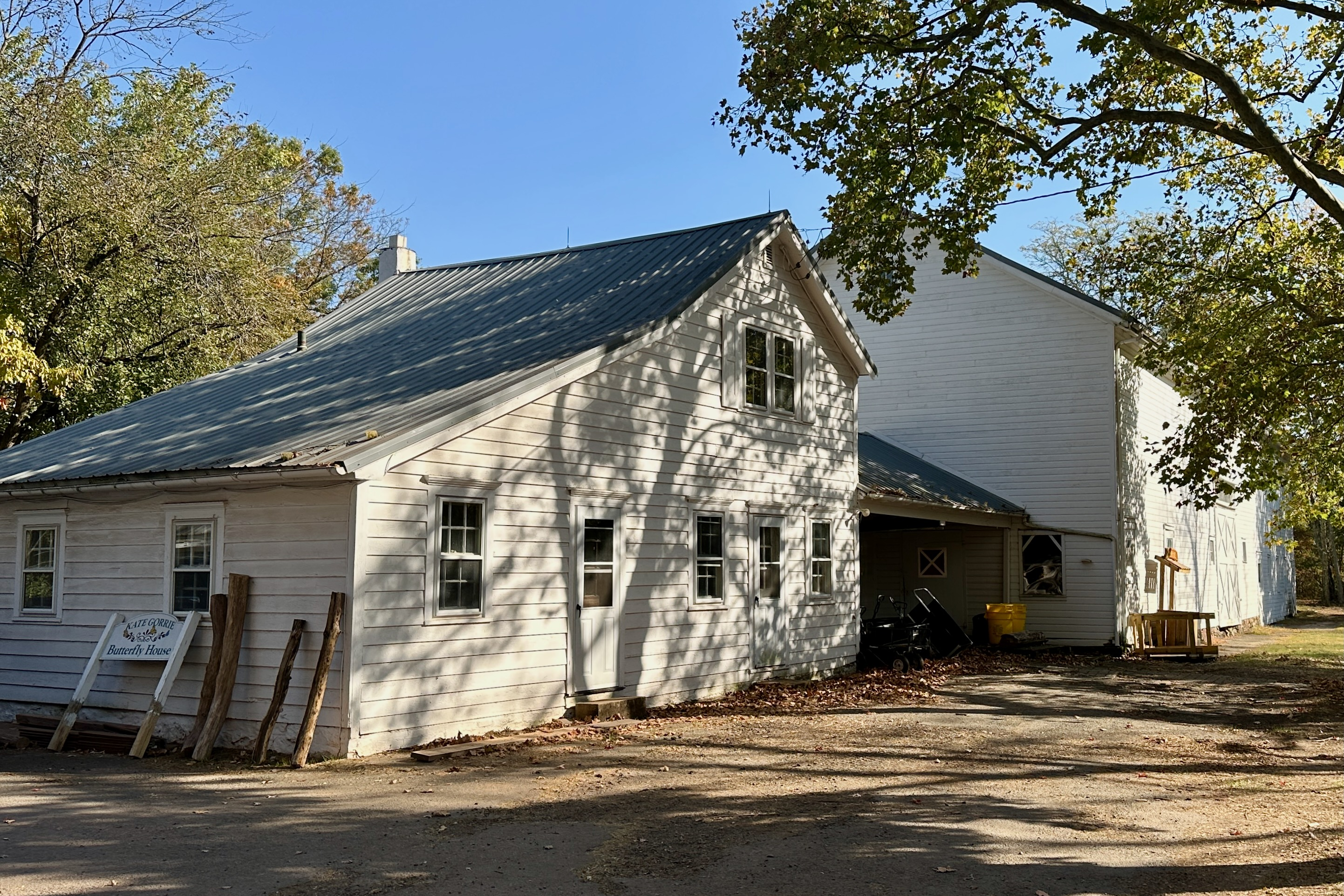
Small barn and main barn

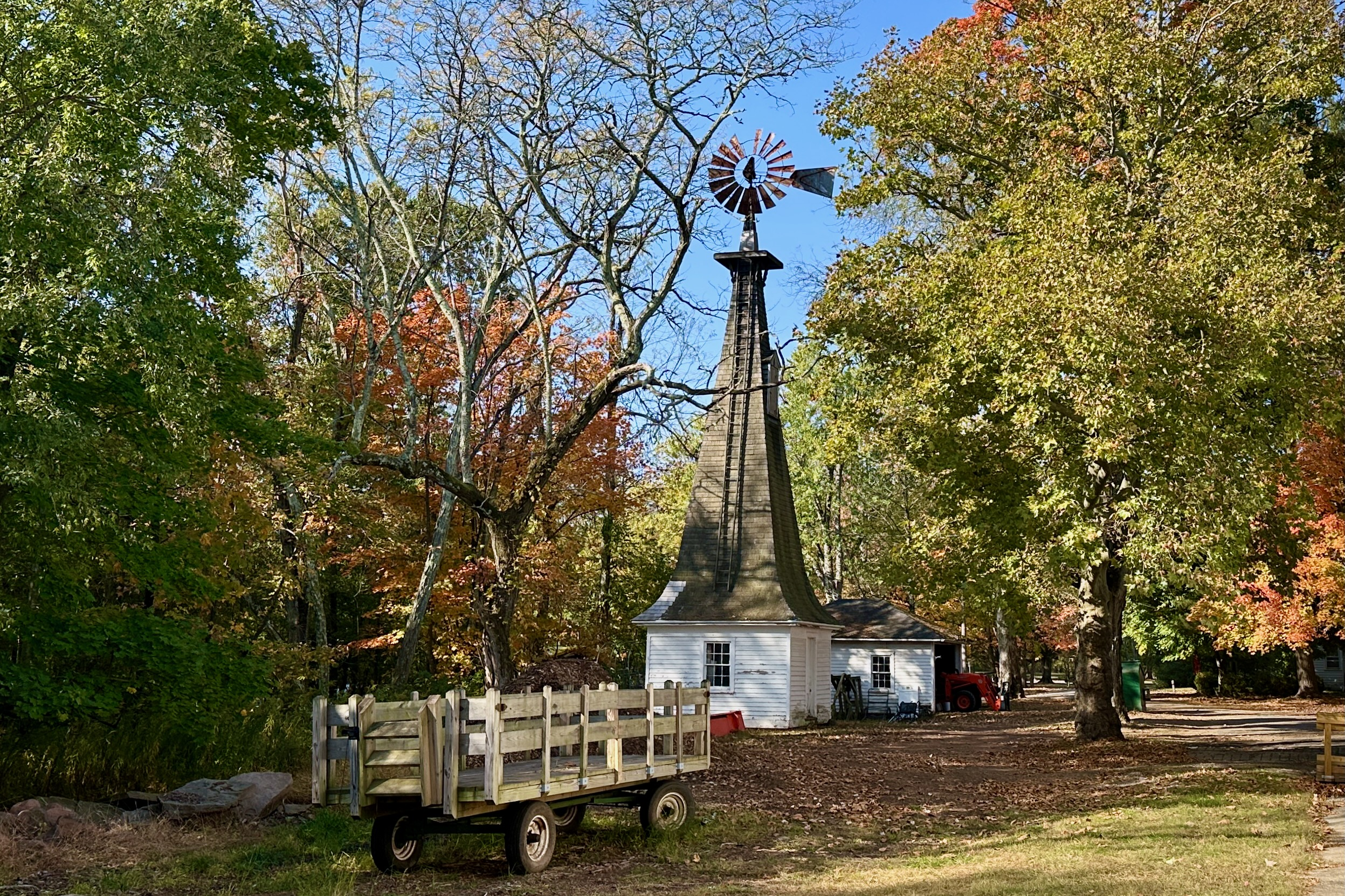
Wellhouse with windmill

== Arboretum ==
The Stony Brook Millstone Watershed Arboretum is an arboretum maintained by the institute. The arboretum is located at 31 Titus Mill Road (40.3525°N 74.7727°W), Hopewell Township, in Mercer County, New Jersey and is open daily without charge.

The arboretum is located within the association's 860-acre (3.5 km^{2}) nature reserve. Its tree collection includes Acer japonicum (Japanese maple), Acer saccharinum (silver maple), Carya spp. (hickory), Cedrus libani (blue atlas cedar), Fagus grandifolia (American beech), Ginkgo biloba (ginkgo), Ilex opaca (American holly), Liquidambar styraciflua (sweetgum), Magnolia sp. (magnolia), Metasequoia glyptostroboides (dawn redwood), Platanus occidentalis (American sycamore), and Quercus spp. (oak).

== See also ==
- National Register of Historic Places listings in Mercer County, New Jersey
- List of botanical gardens in the United States
