= Edward Chapman (politician) =

British politician

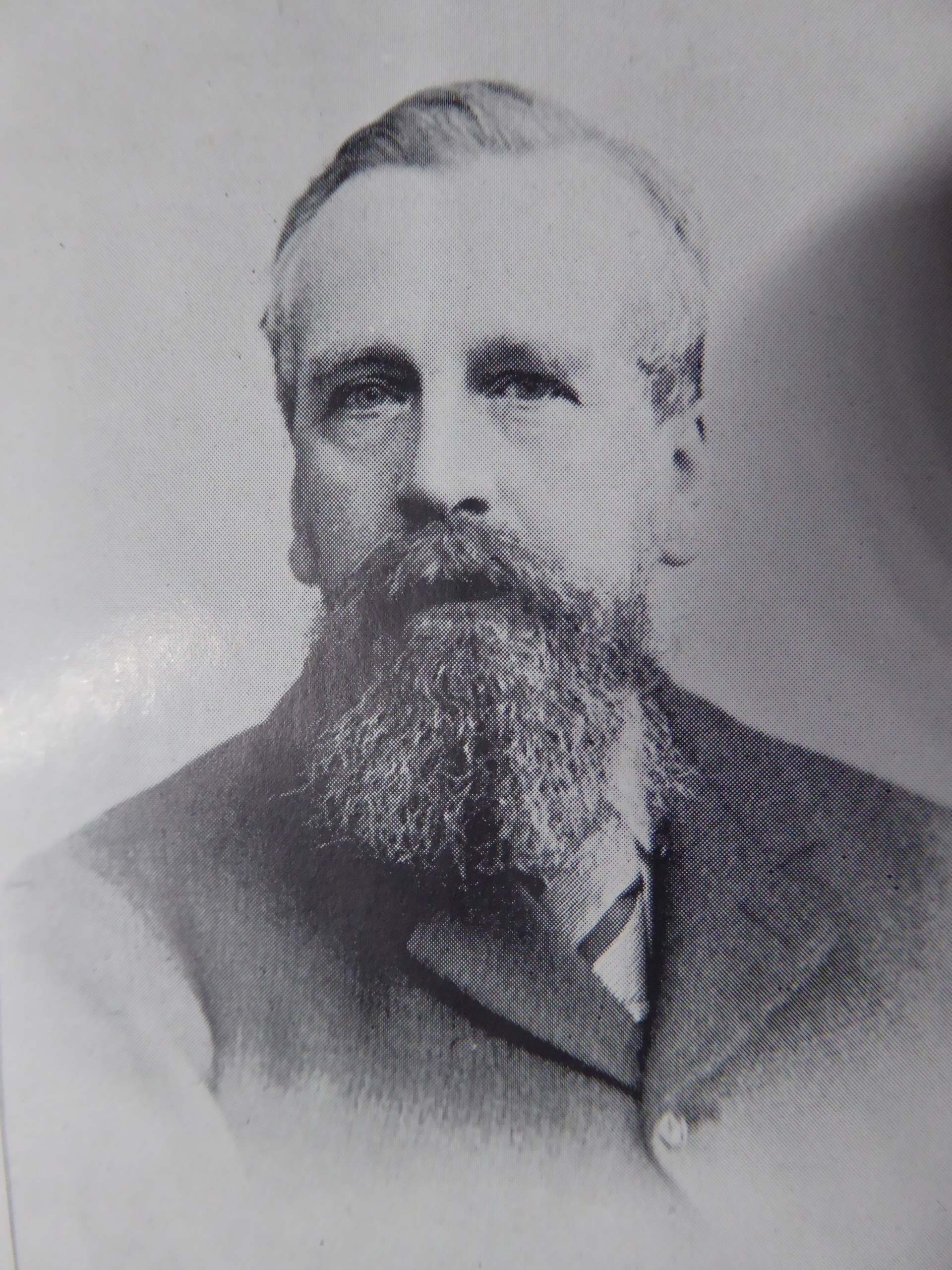
- Edward Chapman, c.1901

Member of Parliament for Hyde
- In office 1900–1906
- Preceded by: Joseph Watson Sidebotham
- Succeeded by: Charles Duncan Schwann

Personal details
- Born: 12 October 1839
- Died: 25 July 1906 (aged 66) Hill End House, Mottram, Cheshire, England
- Party: Conservative
- Parent: John Chapman (father)

Edward Chapman (12 October 1839 – 25 July 1906) was a British academic and Conservative politician.

He was the son of John Chapman and his wife Ann née Sidebottom, of Hill End House, Hollingworth, near Mottram, Cheshire. John Chapman was Member of Parliament for Great Grimsby and a major landowner, having made a fortune from the development of railways and docks.

Edward Chapman was educated at Merton College, Oxford, having been graduated with a first-class honours degree in Natural Science in 1864. He obtained a master's degree in 1866, and subsequently became a tutor at Magdalen College in 1868. He was appointed a public examiner in the Honours School of Science. He was elected a fellow of Magdalen College in 1882. He was curator of the University Botanic Gardens, and a member of the Linnean and Ashmolean Societies. He married Elizabeth Beardoe Grundy in 1863.

In 1877, his father died and he inherited shares in the Manchester, Sheffield and Lincolnshire Railway, and became a director and deputy chairman of its successor Great Central Railway. He was also a director of the South Eastern and London Chatham and Dover Railway companies, Liverpool, St Helens & South Lancashire Railways and was chairman of Wigan Junction Railways and Oldham, Ashton-under-Lyne and Guide Bridge Junction Railways. He was lord of the manor of Hattersley, an estate purchased by his father.

He was involved in local politics, elected as president of the Hyde Conservative Association in 1895, and for twenty years was chairman of the Mottram Urban District Council.

In 1900, he was elected as Conservative MP for Hyde, and was appointed a deputy lieutenant of Cheshire at the end of 1901. At the ensuing election in 1906 he was defeated by the Liberal candidate Charles Schwann.

Chapman was found dead at Hill End on 25 July 1906, apparently as the result of a fall. He was aged 67.

Parliament of the United Kingdom
Preceded by Joseph Watson Sidebotham	Member of Parliament for Hyde; 1900–1906	Succeeded by Charles Duncan Schwann
