= Joseph Watson Sidebotham =

British politician and colliery owner (1857–1925)

- Sidebotham in 1895.
- Born: 29 April 1857
- Died: 10 June 1925 (aged 68)
- Occupations: British colliery owner, Conservative politician

Joseph Watson Sidebotham (29 April 1857 – 10 June 1925) was a British colliery owner and Conservative politician.

== Life ==
He was the eldest son of Joseph Sidebotham and Anne Coward of Bowdon, Cheshire. He was educated privately and at Owens College, before receiving a Bachelor of Music degree from Trinity College, Cambridge. He married Marian Dowling in 1886.

His family company, Messrs J W Sidebotham and Brothers were the owners of a number of coal mines. In January 1889 an explosion at the company's Hyde Colliery caused the death of twenty-three miners.

He was elected as Conservative MP for the Hyde Division of Cheshire at the 1886 general election, and held the seat until 1900, when he announced his retirement for "private and personal" reasons.

Sidebotham's interest in music led him to introduce a bill in the House of Commons to regulate and register music teachers. Although the bill was unsuccessful, he was elected as a convocation member to the Senate of the University of London, and worked to reform the university's system of accreditation of music degrees.

Parliament of the United Kingdom
Preceded by Thomas Gair Ashton	Member of Parliament for Hyde; 1886–1900	Succeeded by Edward Chapman
