= Hyde (constituency) =

Parliamentary constituency in the United Kingdom, 1885–1918

Coordinates: 53.447°N 2.082°W

- Former county constituency for the House of Commons
- County: Cheshire
- Major settlements: Hyde

1885–1918
- Seats: One
- Created from: East Cheshire
- Replaced by: Stalybridge & Hyde

Hyde was a county constituency represented in the House of Commons of the Parliament of the United Kingdom from 1885 until 1918. It was seated in the town of Hyde, Cheshire.

From the 1918 general election onwards, the town has been represented in parliament through the constituency of Stalybridge and Hyde.

== Boundaries ==
The constituency, officially Cheshire, Hyde Division, was created from the two-member Eastern division of Cheshire by the Redistribution of Seats Act 1885 as one of eight new single-member divisions of Cheshire. It consisted of the following parishes and townships in north east Cheshire: Bredbury, the part of Brinnington outside the Municipal Borough of Stockport, Godley , Hattersley, Hollingworth, Hyde, Marple, Mottram, Newton, Offerton, Romiley, Tintwistle, Torkington and Werneth.

=== Abolition ===
The Representation of the People Act 1918 reorganised constituencies throughout Great Britain and Ireland. The bulk of the Hyde constituency was merged with parliamentary borough of Stalybridge to form the new seat of Stalybridge and Hyde. The Bredbury, Marple and Romiley areas passed to an expanded Macclesfield constituency, while Offerton and Torkington, which now formed part of the urban district of Hazel Grove and Bramhall, were included in Knutsford.

== Members of Parliament ==
Election	Member	Party
1885	Thomas Ashton	Liberal
1886	Joseph Watson Sidebotham	Conservative
1900	Edward Chapman	Conservative
1906	Duncan Schwann	Liberal
1910	Francis Neilson	Liberal
1916 by-election	Thomas Owen Jacobsen	Liberal
1918	Constituency abolished. See Stalybridge and Hyde	

== Elections ==
=== Elections in the 1880s ===
Ashton

General election 1885: Hyde
Party	Candidate	Votes	%	±%
Liberal	Thomas Ashton	4,546	53.3	
Conservative	William Legh	3,990	46.7	
Majority		556	6.6	
Turnout		8,536	91.5	
Registered electors		9,328		
Liberal win (new seat)				

Sidebotham

General election 1886: Hyde
Party	Candidate	Votes	%	±%
Conservative	Joseph Watson Sidebotham	4,328	52.7	+6.0
Liberal	Thomas Ashton	3,885	47.3	−6.0
Majority		443	5.4	N/A
Turnout		8,213	88.0	−3.5
Registered electors		9,328		
Conservative gain from Liberal		Swing	+6.0	

=== Elections in the 1890s ===
General election 1892: Hyde
Party	Candidate	Votes	%	±%
Conservative	Joseph Watson Sidebotham	4,525	51.7	−1.0
Liberal	Thomas Ashton	4,220	48.3	+1.0
Majority		305	3.4	−2.0
Turnout		8,745	90.8	+2.8
Registered electors		9,629		
Conservative hold		Swing	-1.0	

General election 1895: Hyde
Party	Candidate	Votes	%	±%
Conservative	Joseph Watson Sidebotham	4,735	52.4	+0.7
Liberal	George Wood Rhodes	3,844	42.6	−5.7
Ind. Labour Party	George Smith Christie	448	5.0	New
Majority		891	9.8	+6.4
Turnout		9,027	88.4	−2.4
Registered electors		10,208		
Conservative hold		Swing	+3.2	

=== Elections in the 1900s ===
Brunner

General election 1900: Hyde
Party	Candidate	Votes	%	±%
Conservative	Edward Chapman	4,774	53.2	+0.8
Liberal	John Brunner	4,195	46.8	+4.2
Majority		579	6.4	−3.4
Turnout		8,969	88.5	+0.1
Registered electors		10,485		
Conservative hold		Swing	-1.7	

General election 1906: Hyde
Party	Candidate	Votes	%	±%
Liberal	Duncan Swann	5,545	55.3	+8.5
Conservative	Edward Chapman	4,482	44.7	−8.5
Majority		1,063	10.6	N/A
Turnout		10,027	88.6	+0.1
Registered electors		11,314		
Liberal gain from Conservative		Swing	+8.5	

=== Elections in the 1910s ===
General election January 1910: Hyde
Party	Candidate	Votes	%	±%
Liberal	Francis Neilson	4,476	39.5	−15.8
Conservative	Tom Eastham	4,461	39.3	−7.6
Labour	William Crawford Anderson	2,401	21.2	New
Majority		15	0.2	−10.4
Turnout		11,338	93.2	+4.6
Liberal hold		Swing	-4.1	

General election December 1910: Hyde
Party	Candidate	Votes	%	±%
Liberal	Francis Neilson	5,562	51.4	+11.9
Conservative	Tom Smith	5,268	48.6	+9.3
Majority		294	2.8	+2.6
Turnout		10,830	89.0	−4.2
Liberal hold		Swing	+1.3	

General Election 1914–15:

Another General Election was required to take place before the end of 1915. The political parties had been making preparations for an election to take place and by July 1914, the following candidates had been selected;

- Liberal: Francis Neilson
- Unionist: James Leadbitter Knott

1916 Hyde by-election
Party	Candidate	Votes	%	±%
Liberal	Thomas Owen Jacobsen	4,089	56.0	+4.6
Independent	DP Davies	3,215	44.0	New
Majority		874	12.0	+9.2
Turnout		7,304	54.7	−34.3
Liberal hold		Swing		

- nominee of the National Union of Attested Married Men, an organisation opposed to the government's policy on conscription.

== See also ==
- History of parliamentary constituencies and boundaries in Cheshire

== Sources ==
- Leigh Rayment's Historical List of MPs – Constituencies beginning with "H" (part 4)
