= A. M. Rothschild & Company Store =

- U.S. National Register of Historic Places
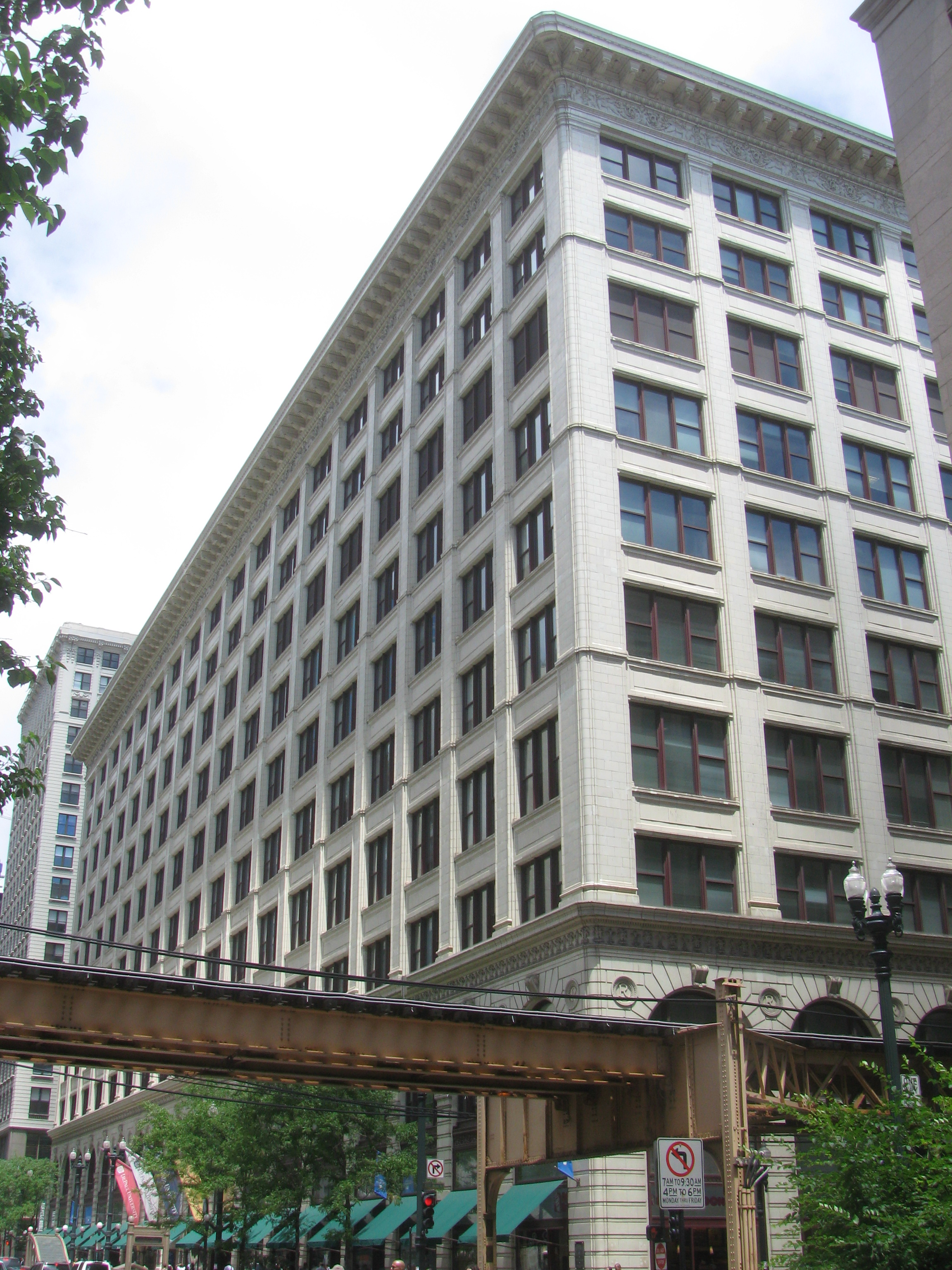

- Location within Illinois Location within the United States
- Location: 333 S. State St., Chicago, Illinois
- Coordinates: 41°52′39″N 87°37′38″W
- Area: less than one acre
- Built: 1912
- Architect: Holabird & Roche
- Architectural style: Chicago school, Beaux Arts
- NRHP reference No.: 89002025
- Added to NRHP: November 27, 1989

The A. M. Rothschild & Company Store, also known as the Goldblatt's Building, is a historic department store building located at 333 South State Street in the Loop neighborhood of Chicago, Illinois.

The store was built in 1912 for the Rothschild & Company department store, which was founded in the late 1800s by Abram M. Rothschild. Prominent Chicago School architects Holabird & Roche designed the store; while the firm had also designed the company's previous, smaller store, the 1912 building was their first and only full-block department store design. The building's skeletal frame and large windows are typical of Chicago School buildings, while its extensive terra cotta ornamentation reflects the then-popular Beaux-Arts style. Rothschild & Company occupied the building until 1923, when Marshall Field & Company purchased it; it was sold again in 1936 to Goldblatt's, who ran their flagship store in the building until 1981.

As of 2022, the building is owned by DePaul University and is primarily used for classrooms, though the building also contains the university's downtown library, cafeteria, and student union. A Barnes & Noble store uses most of the first-level retail space.

The building was added to the National Register of Historic Places on November 27, 1989.
