= The Pelkus Gate near Utrecht =

Painting by Jan van Goyen

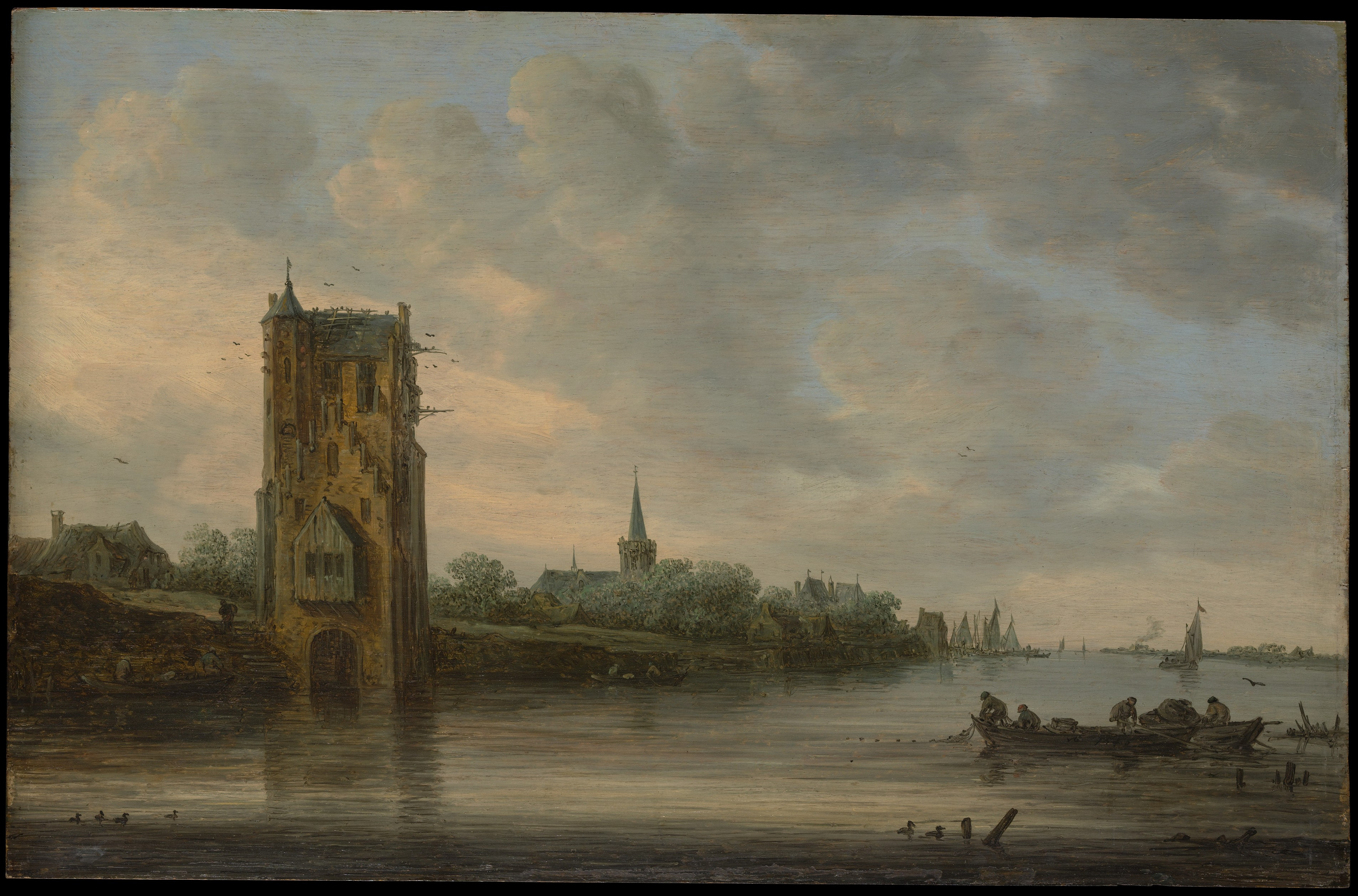
- Artist: Jan van Goyen
- Year: 1646
- Medium: Oil on wood
- Dimensions: 14.5 cm × 22.5 cm (5.7 in × 8.9 in)
- Location: Metropolitan Museum of Art, New York

The Pelkus Gate near Utrecht is an oil painting by Jan van Goyen, completed in 1646. It is one of about a dozen paintings by van Goyen that depicted the Pelkus gate, a freestanding tower on the river Vecht that disappeared by the 18th century. It is currently on display at the Metropolitan Museum of Art.

== Context ==
Van Goyen completed about a dozen paintings depicting some form of the Pelkus gate. Each of the paintings' surroundings and structures vary greatly, suggesting that they were invented by van Goyen.
