= Sir Charles Swann, 1st Baronet =

British politician

Charles Swann c1895

Sir Charles Swann c1910

Sir Charles Ernest Swann, 1st Baronet, (25 January 1844 – 13 July 1929) was a British businessman and Liberal Party politician.

He was born as Charles Ernest Schwann, fifth son of J Frederick Schwann of Gloucester Square, London (and originally from Frankfurt, Germany) and Henrietta Kell of Birmingham. His father carried on business in Huddersfield, Yorkshire, and Charles received his early education in the town. He subsequently attended Owen's College, Manchester and University College London.

Swann became a merchant in Manchester, and became a leading member of the Liberal movement in the city. He was, by turn, the secretary, treasurer and president of the Manchester Liberal Federation. He was also president of the Manchester Reform Club and for nine years president of the National Reform Union.

In 1885 he was the unsuccessful Liberal candidate for the new constituency of Manchester North. However, another general election was held in the following year, and Swann was elected as member of parliament. He was to remain Manchester North's MP until 1918. He was regarded as an "advanced radical", and took an interest in the constitutional affairs of India, attending the opening of the National Indian Congress in 1890.

In 1906 Charles Schwann was created a baronet "of Prince's Gardens in the Royal Borough of Kensington" and in 1911 he was as appointed to the Privy Council. In 1913 Schwann changed his surname to Swann by royal licence.

He married Elizabeth Duncan in 1876, and they had four sons and a daughter. in 1896, Elizabeth was one of a group of Victorian women and men who founded the Union of Ethical Societies (now known as Humanists UK) and presided over its inaugural meeting. Sir C E Swann died at his residence in Birkdale, Lancashire in 1929, aged 85. He was buried in Putney Vale Cemetery.

Parliament of the United Kingdom
New constituency	Member of Parliament for Manchester North; 1886–1918	Constituency abolished
Baronetage of the United Kingdom
New creation	Baronet (of Prince's Gardens); 1906–1929	Succeeded by Duncan Swann
