= Manchester North =

Parliamentary constituency in the United Kingdom, 1885–1918

Coordinates: 53°31′N 2°13′W

- Former borough constituency for the House of Commons

1885–1918
- Created from: Manchester
- Replaced by: Manchester Clayton, Manchester Exchange and Manchester Platting

Manchester North was one of six single-member Parliamentary constituencies created in 1885 by the division of the existing three-member Parliamentary Borough of Manchester. It was abolished in 1918.

== Boundaries ==
The constituency was created by the Redistribution of Seats Act 1885, and was defined as consisting of the following areas:

- St. Michael's ward,
- The Parish of Harpurhey,
- and "so much of the Parish of Newton as lies to the north-west of a line drawn along the centre of the Oldham Road".

The next redistribution took place under the terms of the Representation of the People Act 1918. The bulk of the seat became part of the new constituency of Manchester Platting, with parts passing to Manchester Exchange and Manchester Clayton.

== Members of Parliament ==
Election	Member	Party	Notes
1885	James Frederick Hutton	Conservative	
1886	Sir Charles Schwann	Liberal	Schwann changed his name to Swann in 1913
1918	constituency abolished		

== Elections ==
=== Elections in the 1880s ===
26 November 1885: Manchester North
Party	Candidate	Votes	%	±%
Conservative	James Hutton	4,093	56.8	
Liberal	Charles Schwann	3,118	43.2	
Majority		975	13.6	
Turnout		7,211	82.9	
Registered electors		8,703		
Conservative win (new seat)				

2 July 1886: Manchester North
Party	Candidate	Votes	%	±%
Liberal	Charles Schwann	3,476	50.7	+7.5
Conservative	James Hutton	3,380	49.3	−7.5
Majority		96	1.4	N/A
Turnout		6,856	78.8	−4.1
Registered electors		8,703		
Liberal gain from Conservative		Swing	+7.5	

=== Elections in the 1890s ===
6 July 1892: Manchester North
Party	Candidate	Votes	%	±%
Liberal	Charles Schwann	4,258	51.9	+1.2
Conservative	Joseph Yates	3,953	48.1	−1.2
Majority		305	3.8	+2.4
Turnout		8,211	84.2	+5.4
Registered electors		9,747		
Liberal hold		Swing	+1.2	

Charles Schwann

13 July 1895: Manchester North
Party	Candidate	Votes	%	±%
Liberal	Charles Schwann	4,327	52.8	+0.9
Conservative	Arthur Morton	3,872	47.2	−0.9
Majority		455	5.6	+1.8
Turnout		8,199	80.5	−3.7
Registered electors		10,179		
Liberal hold		Swing	+0.9	

=== Elections in the 1900s ===
2 October 1900: Manchester North
Party	Candidate	Votes	%	±%
Liberal	Charles Schwann	4,258	50.2	−2.6
Conservative	William Joynson-Hicks	4,232	49.8	+2.6
Majority		26	0.4	−5.2
Turnout		8,490	78.8	−1.7
Registered electors		10,770		
Liberal hold		Swing	−2.6	

13 January 1906: Manchester North
Party	Candidate	Votes	%	±%
Liberal	Charles Schwann	5,716	63.7	+13.5
Conservative	Harry Sowler	3,262	36.3	−13.5
Majority		2,454	27.4	+27.0
Turnout		8,978	84.5	+5.7
Registered electors		10,624		
Liberal hold		Swing	+13.5	

=== Elections in the 1910s ===
Schwann

General Election, January 1910: Manchester North
Party	Candidate	Votes	%	±%
Liberal	Charles Schwann	5,210	56.9	−6.8
Conservative	Hiram Edward Howell	3,951	43.1	+6.8
Majority		1,259	13.8	−13.6
Turnout		9,161	89.1	+4.6
Registered electors		10,284		
Liberal hold		Swing	−6.8	

General Election, December 1910: Manchester North
Party	Candidate	Votes	%	±%
Liberal	Charles Schwann	4,601	53.9	−3.0
Conservative	Hiram Edward Howell	3,936	46.1	+3.0
Majority		665	7.8	−6.0
Turnout		8,537	83.0	−6.1
Registered electors		10,284		
Liberal hold		Swing	−3.0	

== Sources ==
Election Results:

- https://web.archive.org/web/20060520143104/http://www.manchester.gov.uk/elections/archive/gen1900.htm
- https://web.archive.org/web/20060520143047/http://www.manchester.gov.uk/elections/archive/gen1945.htm
- Entry for Arthur Henry Aylmer Morton in 'Who Was Who' accessed via http://www.knowuk.co.uk

Schwann:

- Namechange http://homepage.eircom.net/~lawedd/TITLESM-Z.htm
- Image and biography http://www.spinningtheweb.org.uk/bookbrowse.php?irn=2450&sub=&theme=home&crumb=
