= Joseph Buttinger =

Austrian politician (1906–1992)

Joseph Buttinger (30 April 1906, Reichersbeuern, Germany – 4 March 1992, Queens, New York) was an Austrian politician and, after his immigration to the United States, an expert on East Asia. He co-founded the American Friends of Vietnam, a Cold War lobbying group.

== Biography ==
Buttinger was born into a working-class family and left school at age 13 to help support his family. He became a youth movement leader in Austria and, by the age of 24, was secretary of the Social Democratic Party. After being imprisoned for several months in 1934, he became chairman of the Socialist underground and its leader of covert activities against the newly founded Federal State of Austria and Chancellor Engelbert Dollfuss. When Germany occupied Austria in 1938, he and his American-born wife Muriel Gardiner fled to Paris, where he was the chairman of the exiled Austrian Social Democrats. In 1939, several months before the fall of France, the couple moved to the United States with Gardiner's daughter from a previous marriage, Connie, whom Joseph later adopted.

In 1941, he and his wife arranged US visas for his brother Alois Buttinger and his family; one of the references for the visa application was signed by Alfred Einstein.

During and after World War II, Buttinger helped establish many of the refugee programs for the International Rescue Committee (IRC). His personal actions helped smuggle thousands of anti-Fascist and later anti-communists refugees out of Europe. For over 40 years he served as director of the IRC's Paris office and European division, and as an IRC board member and vice president.

Under Buttinger's tenure, the Committee became covertly involved with the Central Intelligence Agency. In the 1950s, the IRC made an agreement with the CIA that they would take on projects which the US government did not want to openly be associated in the Indochina wars. IRC official Harold Oram operated as a secret liaison between Buttinger and Allen Dulles.

In the 1950s, Buttinger and his wife subsidized the democratic socialist magazine Dissent, edited by Irving Howe. He also wrote "In the Twilight of Socialism", which was a history of the Austrian Social Democrats during the years 1934–38.

=== American Friends of Vietnam ===
During the 1950s, he aided North Vietnamese refugees in South Vietnam and took an abiding interest in the history and culture of that country. Initially a friend and supporter of South Vietnam's founder, Ngo Dinh Diem, Buttinger became disillusioned with Diem's dictatorial ways and renounced him.

Buttinger was originally introduced to Diem by Edward Lansdale of the CIA, and under Lansdale's encouragement Buttinger formed the American Friends of Vietnam (AFVN). AFVN lobbied for increasing US funding of South Vietnam and the escalation of military action against communism. It also covertly coordinated propaganda efforts directed at the American public, such as Lansdale and Joseph L. Mankiewicz's controversial pro-CIA film adaptation of The Quiet American.

Buttinger became a prominent scholar of Vietnamese culture and politics, producing a two-volume work entitled Vietnam: A Dragon Embattled. He also produced several other books on Vietnam and on the history of socialism. In opposition to early critics of US intervention like Graham Greene, and the later conclusions of the Pentagon Papers, Buttinger refused to concede that Ho Chi Minh's popularity in the South, and the unpopularity of the Saigon government, had created a civil war situation.

=== Later life ===
In 1972 the Austrian Government awarded him its Golden Order of Merit. According to the New York Times, the then-Chancellor of Austria, Bruno Kreisky, observed that `Mr. Buttinger was such a hero that if he had returned he would have become Chancellor.'

The Mina Rees Library of the CUNY Graduate Center owns the “Joseph Buttinger Collection on Utopias.”

== Works ==
- "In the Twilight of Socialism" (1953)
- "The Smaller Dragon -- A Political History of Vietnam" (1958)
- "Vietnam: A Dragon Embattled" (1967)
- "Vietnam: A Political History" (1968)
- "A Dragon Defiant: A Short History of Vietnam" (1972)
- "Vietnam: The Unforgettable Tragedy" (1977).
