= Gustavus Franklin Swift =

American entrepreneur in the meat industry (1839–1903)

Gustavus Franklin Swift, Sr.
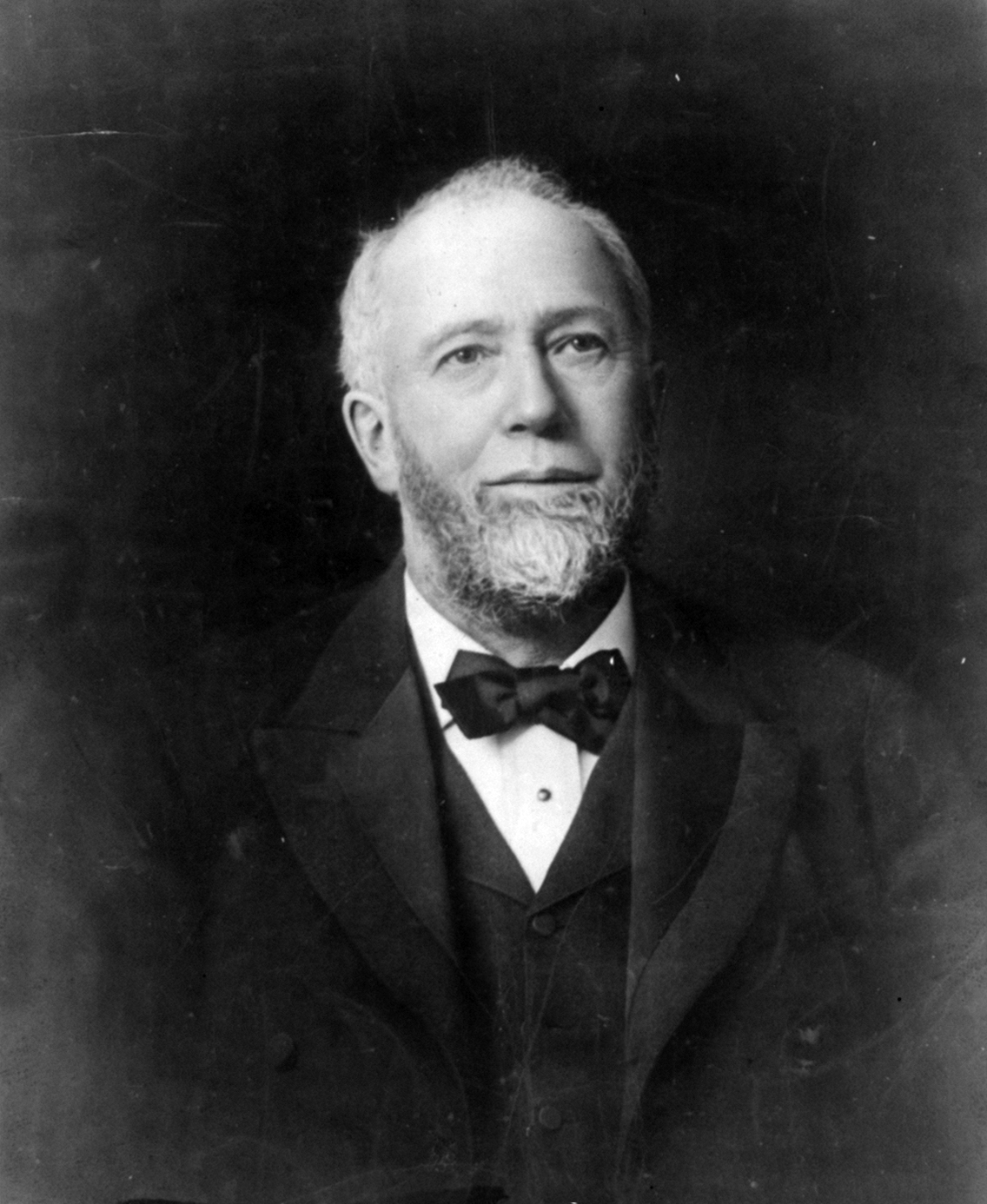
- Swift in 1903
- Born: June 24, 1839; Sagamore, Massachusetts
- Died: March 29, 1903 (aged 63); Chicago, Illinois
- Resting place: Chicago, Illinois; Mount Hope Cemetery; 41.681099°N 87.690804°W
- Education: High School
- Spouse: Annie Maria Higgins
- Children: 11, including Louis Franklin and Helen Louise
- Parent(s): William Swift; Sally Crowell

Gustavus Franklin Swift Sr. (June 24, 1839 – March 29, 1903) was an American business executive. He founded a meat-packing empire in the Midwest during the late 19th century, over which he presided until his death. He is credited with the development of the first practical ice-cooled railroad car, which allowed his company to ship dressed meats to all parts of the country and abroad, ushering in the "era of cheap beef." Swift pioneered the use of animal by-products for the manufacture of soap, glue, fertilizer, various types of sundries, and even medical products.

Swift donated large sums of money to such institutions as the University of Chicago, the Methodist Episcopal Church, and YMCA. He established Northwestern University's "School of Oratory" in memory of his daughter, Annie May Swift, who died while a student there. When he died in 1903, his company was valued at between US$125 million and $135 million, and had a workforce of more than 21,000. "The House of Swift" slaughtered as many as two million cattle, four million hogs, and two million sheep a year. Three years after his death, the value of the company's capital stock topped $250 million. He and his family are interred in a mausoleum in Mount Hope Cemetery in Chicago.

== Biography ==
Swift was born on June 24, 1839, in Sagamore, Massachusetts, the 9th of 12 offspring of William Swift and Sally Crowell. His parents were descendants of British settlers who went to New England in the 17th century. The family (which included Gustavus’ brothers Noble and Edwin) lived and worked on a farm in the Cape Cod town of West Sandwich, Massachusetts, where they raised and slaughtered cattle, sheep, and hogs. This is where he got the idea of packing meat.

As a young boy, Swift took little interest in his studies and left the nearby country school after eight years. During that period he was employed in several jobs, finally finding full-time work in his elder brother Noble's butcher shop at the age of fourteen. Two years later, in 1855, he opened his own cattle and pork butchering business with the help of one of his uncles who gave him $400. Swift purchased livestock at the market in Brighton and drove them to Eastham, a ten-day journey. A shrewd businessman, he purportedly followed the somewhat common practice of denying his herds water during the last miles of the trip so that they would drink large quantities of liquid once they reached their final destination, effectively boosting their weights. Swift married Annie Maria Higgins of North Eastham in 1861. Annie gave birth to eleven children, nine of whom reached adulthood. In 1862, Swift and his new bride opened a small butcher shop and slaughterhouse. Seven years later Gustavus and Annie moved the family to the Brighton neighborhood of Boston, where in 1872 Swift became partner in a new venture, Hathaway and Swift. Swift and partner James A. Hathaway (a renowned Boston meat dealer) initially relocated the company to Albany, then almost immediately thereafter to Buffalo.

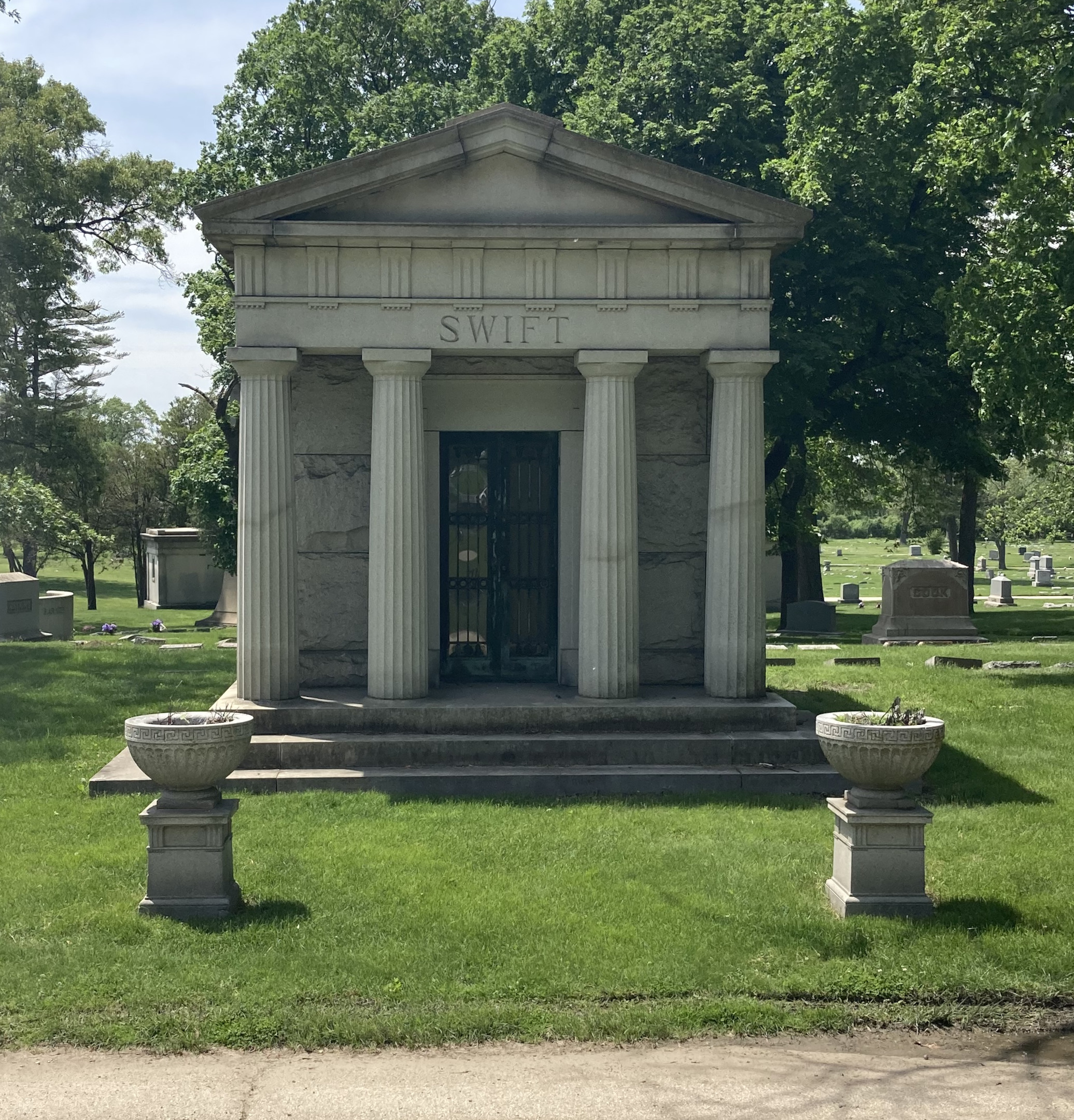
Swift mausoleum at Mount Hope Cemetery

An astute cattle-buyer, Swift followed the market steadily westward. On his recommendation, Hathaway and Swift moved once more in 1875, this time to join the influx of meat packers setting up shop in Chicago's sprawling Union Stock Yards. Swift established himself as one of the dominant figures of "The Yards", and his distinctive delivery wagons became familiar fixtures on Chicago's streets. In 1878 his partnership with Hathaway ended and Swift Bros and Company was formed in partnership with younger brother Edwin. The company became a driving force in the Chicago meat packing industry, and was incorporated in 1885 as Swift & Co. with $300,000 in capital stock and Gustavus Swift as president. It is from this position that Swift led the way in revolutionizing how meat was processed, delivered, and sold.

He died on March 29, 1903, at his home 4848 Ellis Avenue in Chicago.

== Chicago and the birth of the meat-packing industry ==
Following the end of the American Civil War, Chicago emerged as a major railway center, making it an ideal point for the distribution of livestock raised on the Great Plains to Eastern markets. Getting the animals to market required herds to be driven distances of up to 1,200 miles (1,900 km) to railheads in Kansas City, Missouri, where they were loaded into stock cars and transported live (on the hoof) to regional processing centers. Driving cattle across the plains led to tremendous weight loss, and a number of animals died in transit. Upon arrival at the local processing facility, livestock were either slaughtered by wholesalers and delivered fresh to nearby butcher shops for retail sale, smoked, or packed for shipment in barrels of salt.

Certain inefficiencies were inherent in the process of transporting live animals by rail, particularly due to the fact that approximately 60% of the animal's mass is inedible. Many animals weakened by the long drive died in transit, further increasing the per-unit shipping cost. Swift's solution to these problems was to devise a method to ship dressed meats from his packing plant in Chicago to the East.

== Advent of the refrigerator car ==
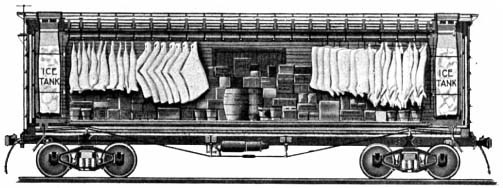
An early refrigerator car design, circa 1870. Hatches in the roof provided access to the ice tanks at each end of the car.

A number of attempts were made during the mid-19th century to ship agricultural products via rail car. As early as 1842 the Western Railroad of Massachusetts was reported in the June 15 edition of the Boston Traveler to be experimenting with innovative freight car designs capable of carrying all types of perishable goods without spoilage. The first known refrigerated boxcar or "reefer" entered service on the Northern Railroad (or NRNY, which became part of the Rutland Railroad) in June 1851. This "icebox on wheels" was a limited success in that it was only able to function in cold weather. That same year, the Ogdensburg and Lake Champlain Railroad (O&LC) began shipping butter to Boston in purpose-built freight cars, utilizing ice to cool the contents.

The first consignment of dressed beef to leave the Chicago stockyards was in 1857, and was carried in ordinary boxcars retrofitted with bins filled with ice. Placing the meat directly against ice resulted in discoloration and affected the taste, hence proved impractical. During the same period Swift experimented by moving cut meat using a string of ten boxcars which ran with their doors removed, and made a few test shipments to New York City during the winter months over the Grand Trunk Railway (GTR). The method proved too limited to be practical. Detroit's William Davis patented a refrigerator car that employed metal racks to suspend the carcasses above a frozen mixture of ice and salt. He sold the design in 1868 to George H. Hammond, a Detroit meat-packer, who built a set of cars to transport his products to Boston using ice from the Great Lakes for cooling. The loads had the unfortunate tendency of swinging to one side when the car entered a curve at high speed, and the use of the units was discontinued after several derailments. In 1878 Swift hired engineer Andrew Chase to design a ventilated car that was well-insulated, and positioned the ice in a compartment at the top of the car, allowing the chilled air to flow naturally downward.

The meat was packed tightly at the bottom of the car to keep the center of gravity low and to prevent the cargo from shifting. Chase's design proved to be a practical solution to providing temperature-controlled carriage of dressed meats, and allowed Swift & Company to ship their products all over the United States, and internationally. This radically altered the meat business. Swift's attempts to sell this design to the major railroads were unanimously rebuffed as the companies feared that they would jeopardize their considerable investments in stock cars and animal pens if refrigerated meat transport gained wide acceptance. In response, Swift financed the initial production run on his own, then — when the American railroads refused his business — he contracted with the GTR (a railroad that derived little income from transporting live cattle) to haul them into Michigan and then eastward through Canada. In 1880, the Peninsular Car Company (subsequently purchased by American Car & Foundry) delivered to Swift the first of these units, and the Swift Refrigerator Line (SRL) was created. Within a year the Line's roster had risen to nearly 200 units, and Swift was transporting an average of 3,000 carcasses a week to Boston. Competing firms such as Armour and Company quickly followed. By 1920 the SRL owned and operated 7,000 ice-cooled rail cars. The General American Transportation Corporation assumed ownership of the line in 1930.

Live cattle and dressed beef deliveries to New York (tons):

	(Stock Cars)	(Refrigerator Cars)
Year	Live Cattle	Dressed Beef
1882	366,487	2,633
1883	392,095	16,365
1884	328,220	34,956
1885	337,820	53,344
1886	280,184	69,769

The subject cars travelled on the Erie, Lackawanna, New York Central, and Pennsylvania railroads.

Source: Railway Review, January 29, 1887, p. 62.

== "Everything but the squeal" ==
In response to public outcries to reduce the amount of pollutants generated by his packing plants, Swift sought innovative ways to use previously discarded portions of the animals his company butchered. This practice led to the wide scale commercial production of such diverse products as oleomargarine, soap, glue, fertilizer, hairbrushes, buttons, knife handles, and pharmaceutical preparations such as pepsin and insulin. Low-grade meats were canned in products like pork and beans.

The absence of any federal inspection led to many abuses in the packing plants. Spoiled meat, dead rats, sawdust and practically anything else might have been mixed with fresh meat and ground up into sausages. Rancid, rejected and unsold meat was frequently repackaged and resold. (Swift once bragged that his slaughterhouses had become so sophisticated that they used "everything but the squeal.") Transgressions such as these were first documented in Upton Sinclair's fictional novel The Jungle, the publication of which shocked the nation and led to the passing of the Federal Meat Inspection Act and Pure Food and Drug Act of 1906.

== Vertical integration ==
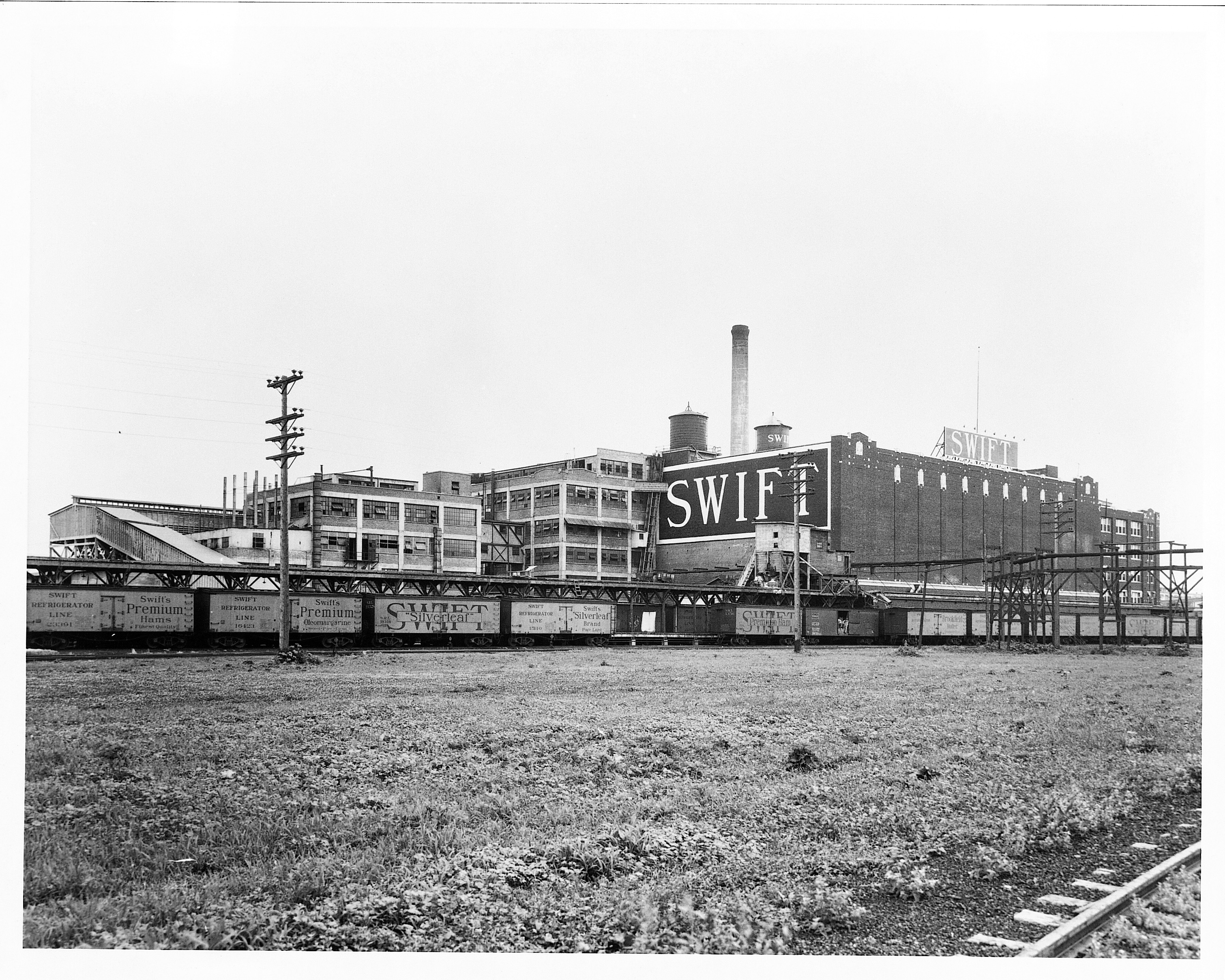
A view of the Swift Brands Sioux City, Iowa, meat-packing plant, circa 1917. All but one of the refrigerator cars in the photo bear the markings of the Swift Refrigerator Line.

The meat packing plants of Chicago were among the first to utilize assembly line (or in this case, disassembly-line) production techniques. Henry Ford states in his autobiography My Life and Work that it was a visit to a Chicago slaughterhouse which opened his eyes to the virtues of employing a moving conveyor system and fixed work stations in industrial applications. These practices symbolize the concept of "rationalized organization of work" to this day.

Swift adapted the methods of the industrial revolution to meat packing operations, which resulted in huge efficiency by allowing his plants to produce on a massive scale. The work was divided into myriad specific sub-tasks, which were carried out under the direction of supervisory personnel. Swift & Co. was broken down organizationally into various divisions, each one responsible for conducting a different aspect of the business of "bringing meat from the ranch to the consumer". By developing a vertically integrated company, Swift was able to control the sale of his meats from the slaughterhouse to the local butcher shop.

Swift devoted a great deal of time to indoctrinating employees and teaching them the company's methods and policies. His employees also had fair wages for both men and women. He also motivated his employees to focus on the company's profit goals by adhering to a strict policy of promotion from within the organization. The innovations that Swift championed not only revolutionized the meat packing industry, but also played a vital role in establishing the modern American business system, with an emphasis on mass production, functional specialization, managerial expertise, national distribution networks, and adaptation to technological innovation.

== Notes ==
Preceded by	President of Swift & Company; 1885–1903	Succeeded by Louis Swift (son)
