= Morris & Company =

Meat packing company in Chicago

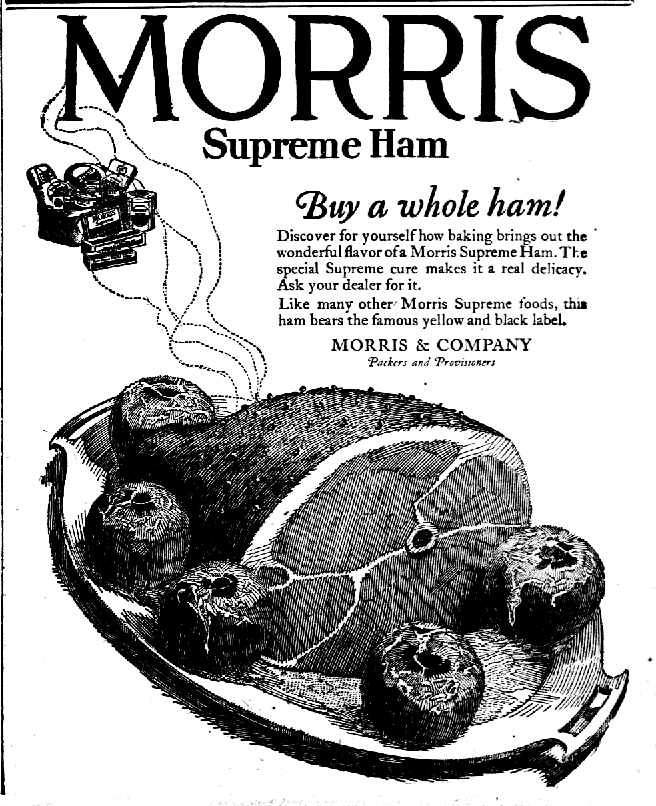
1922 newspaper ad for Morris Supreme ham.

Morris and Company, was one of several meatpacking companies in Chicago, Illinois, and in South Omaha, Nebraska.

== History ==
Morris & Company was founded by Nelson Morris in Chicago. In 1902, with Nelson's son Edward Morris as president, it agreed to merge with the other two (Armour & Company and Swift & Company) to form a giant corporation called the National Packing Company. Conceived primarily as a holding company, National Packing soon began buying up smaller meat companies, such as G. H. Hammond and Fowler.

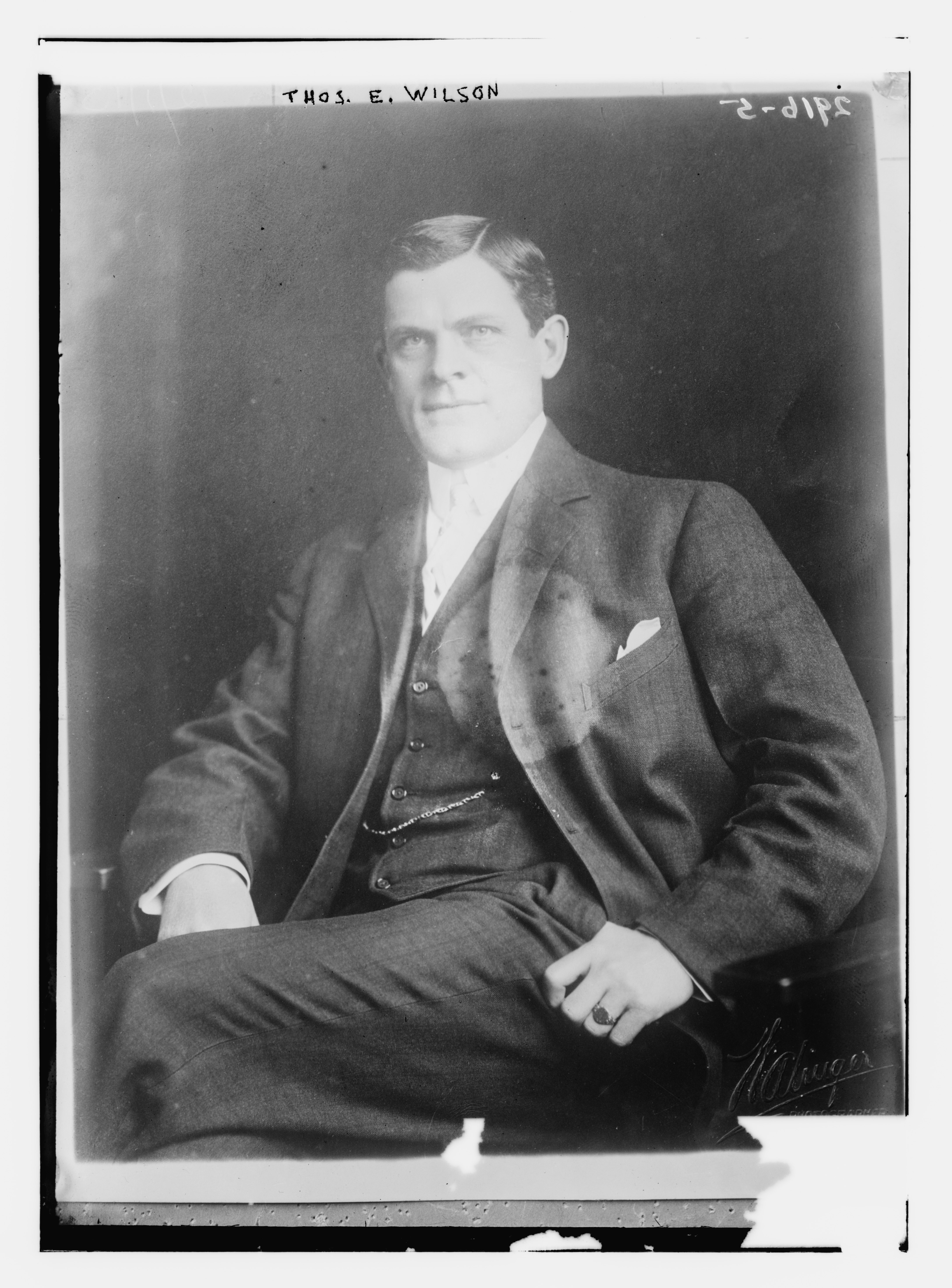
Thomas E. Wilson (1868-1958), president of Morris & Company in 1913

Between 1904 and 1910, National Packing acquired 23 stockyards and slaughtering plants nationwide, which gave it control over about one-tenth of U.S. meat production. The company owned branches in over 150 cities around the world, along with a fleet of 2,600 refrigerated railcars.

Starting in 1905, the constituent companies in National Packing were targeted by Kansas City judge Arba Seymour Van Valkenburgh under the Elkins Act. Pressure from U.S. government regulators forced the dissolution of National Packing in 1912, leaving the structure of the American meat industry about the same as it had been before 1902.

The demerged Armour ultimately absorbed Morris & Co. in 1922, with the deal finalized in 1923.

== See also ==
- History of Omaha
