= Albery =

Albery is a name. It may refer to:

== Given name ==
- Albery Allson Whitman (1851−1901), African American poet, minister and orator

== Surname ==
- Bronson Albery (1881−1971), English theatre director and impresario
- Donald Albery (1914−1988), English theatre impresario
- Ian Albery (born 1936), English theatre consultant, manager, and producer
- Irving Albery (1879−1967), English politician
- James Albery (1838−1889), English dramatist
- James Albery (field hockey) (born 1995), English field hockey player
- Jessica Mary Albery (1908–1990), British architect and town planner
- John Albery (1936−2013), British chemist and academic
- Nicholas Albery (1948−2001), British alternative society activist
- Nobuko Albery (born 1940), Japanese author and theatrical producer
- Tim Albery (born 1952), English stage director
- Wyndham Albery (1882–1940), British politician and accountant

== See also ==
- The Albery Theatre, now renamed the Noël Coward Theatre
- Frank Alberry (1892–1968), Australian soldier
