= Albery family =

British Family

The Albery family is a British family of theatre managers, playwrights and politicians who helped to build the London theatre into the tourist attraction that it is today. They ran the Albery Theatre which is now the Noël Coward.

The Albery Family Tree

James Albery	Mary Moore
Sir Irving Albery	Gertrude Mary Jones	Sir Bronson Albery	Una Gwynn Rolleston	Wyndham Albery
Jessica Mary Albery	Michael Albery	Peter Albery	Sir Donald Albery	Rubina MacGilchrist	Cicely Boys	Nobuko Morris
William Albery	Oliver Albery	Ian Albery	Nicholas Albery	Tim Albery

== James Albery ==
James Albery's (1838-1889) work included Dr. Davy, produced in 1866 at the Lyceum, and Two Roses, produced in 1870 at the Vaudeville. His wife was actress Mary Moore. They had three sons, Irving, Bronson and Wyndham.

== Jessica Mary Albery ==
Jessica Albery (1908–1990) was a British architect and town planner, and one of the first generation of professional women architects in the UK in the early 20th century.

== Mary Moore ==
Mary Charlotte Moore (1861-1931), later Lady Wyndham, was an English actress and theatrical manager. She was known for her appearances in comedies alongside the actor-manager Charles Wyndham. She was married to James Albery from 1879 to 1889, and after his death her relationship with Wyndham eventually became romantic. After the death of Wyndham's estranged wife in 1916, they married. She was a very capable businesswoman and was joint proprietor of Wyndham's Theatre and the New Theatre (now the Noël Coward Theatre). After Wyndham's death she founded a limited company through which she controlled the two theatres until she died in 1931, aged 69.

== Sir Irving Albery ==
The eldest son of James Albery and Mary Moore, Irving Albery was a Conservative Party politician who served as Member of Parliament for Gravesend from 1924 to 1945. He married Gertrude Mary, (née Jones (1884–1967), daughter of playwright Henry Arthur Jones) and their daughter Jessica Albery was one of the first professional women architects in the UK. A grandson was chemist John Albery.

== Sir Bronson Albery ==
The second son of James Albery and Mary Moore, Bronson Albery (March 6, 1881 – July 21, 1971) assumed control of the family theatres with Charles Wyndham's son, Howard. Bronson produced The Knight of the Burning Pestle (1920), David Garrick (1922) and Saint Joan (1924). He established the Arts Theatre Club (1927) and was the president of the Society of West End Theatre Managers (1941–45, 1952–53). He was knighted in 1949. He married Una Gwynn Rolleston, daughter of the writer T. W. Rolleston.

== Sir Donald Albery ==
Elder son of Bronson Albery and Una Gwynn Rolleston, Donald Albery (June 19, 1914 – September 14, 1988), took over his father's theatre holdings when the latter died. His producing debut came with Graham Greene's The Living Room (1953). He had many other hits including: Waiting for Godot (1955); The Rose Tattoo, A Taste of Honey, The Hostage, and The World of Suzie Wong! (all in 1959); Fings Ain't Wot They Used T' Be, A Passage to India, and Oliver! (all in 1960); Beyond the Fringe and Celebration (both in 1961); and Who's Afraid of Virginia Woolf? (1964). He produced many plays in New York City as well and was the director of the British company Anglia Television (1958–78). He was knighted in 1977. His third wife was theatrical producer Nobuko Uenishi Morris.

== Ian Albery ==
Son of Donald Albery and his first wife, Rubina Macgilchrist, Ian Albery is a theatre consultant, manager and producer, chief executive of Sadler's Wells Theatre from 1994 to 2002, and in charge of the Donmar Warehouse from 1961 to 1989.

== Nicholas Albery ==
Eldest son of Donald Albery and his second wife, Cicely, daughter of Army officer Reginald Harvey Henderson Boys, Nicholas Albery was a social inventor, instigator and coordinator of a variety of projects aimed at an improvement to society.

== Tim Albery ==
Second son of Donald Albery and Una Gwynn Rolleston, Tim Albery received a Laurence Olivier Award in England and was nominated for the 2020 Dora Mavor Moore Award for Hell's Fury in Canada.

== Wyndham Albery ==
The third son of James Albery and Mary Moore, Wyndham Albery was a politician and accountant, an official of the Independent Labour Party.
