= John Albery =

British physical chemist

Wyndham John Albery FRS
- Born: 5 April 1936; London
- Died: 3 December 2013 (aged 77); Oxford
- Education: Balliol College, Oxford
- Known for: work in electrochemistry, proton transfer kinetics, isotope effects, enzyme kinetics.
- Scientific career
- Fields: Physical chemistry
- Institutions: University College, Oxford, Imperial College London
- Doctoral advisor: Ronnie Bell

Wyndham John Albery FRS (5 April 1936 – 3 December 2013) was a British physical chemist and academic.

== Early life ==
Wyndham John Albery was born on 5 April 1936. His father Michael James Albery (1910–75), a barrister, was part of a sprawling theatrical family network as the son of Gertrude Mary (née Jones, daughter of dramatist Henry Arthur Jones) and Irving Albery a Conservative MP and the son of actress and theatrical manager Mary Moore (later Lady Wyndham) and dramatist James Albery. His aunt Jessica Mary Albery was one of Britain's first female professional architects.

He was educated at Winchester College and Balliol College, Oxford. He undertook his D.Phil. at Oxford with Ronnie Bell, starting in 1960.

== Academic career ==
Albery was appointed to a Weir Junior Research Fellowship in October 1962 and then to a Fellowship and Praelectorship in Chemistry at University College, Oxford in October 1963, where he was briefly a colleague of E. J. Bowen. He served in his college as Junior Dean and Dean, and was Tutor for Admissions from 1968 to 1975. This period culminated in University College coming top of the Norrington Table in 1975.

Coming from the theatrical Albery family, he was an enthusiastic senior member of the University College Players, organiser of the Univ Revue, held in the college Hall, and script-writer for Experimental Theatre Club revues staged by the Etceteras. Early in his career, in 1962, he wrote for ground-breaking BBC satirical comedy television show That Was The Week That Was.

After Oxford, Albery became Professor of Physical Chemistry from 1978 at Imperial College London.

In 1989, he returned to Oxford to be Master of University College. He hosted the visit of President Bill Clinton (a former student of University College) and his wife Hillary Clinton to the college in June 1994.

Albery subsequently became Barrer Fellow in Chemistry at Imperial College. He was a Fellow of the Royal Society in 1985, the first Master of University College to be so. He was an Honorary Fellow of University College, Oxford, and a celebration of his 75th birthday was held in Oxford in 2011.

Albery was a long-term collaborator of Jeremy Knowles, and published many articles with him, for example in studying the energetics of the reaction catalysed by proline racemase.

== Later life ==
He died of cancer on 3 December 2013. A memorial service was held at the University Church of St Mary the Virgin in Oxford on 5 April 2014 with tributes by Leslie Mitchell and Robert Hillman.

== Books ==
- Ring-Disc Electrodes, with M. L. Hitchman, Oxford University Press, 1971 (ISBN 0-19-855349-8).
- Electrode Kinetics, Oxford University Press, 1975 (ISBN 0-19-855433-8).

Academic offices
Preceded by Kingman Brewster	Master of University College, Oxford; 1989–1997	Succeeded by Robin Butler
