= Institute for Social Inventions =

Think tank for improving quality of life

The Institute for Social Inventions was a think tank set up in 1985 to publicise and launch good ideas for improving the quality of life. Its founder Nicholas Albery (1948–2001) sought to promote non-technological innovations.

== History ==
The Institute emerged from the informal network of Social centers and Info-services which spread around in London throughout the 1970s. One of the earliest of these centers was BIT Information Service, founded in 1968 by John "Hoppy" Hopkins.

=== Inception ===
It was during his years as coordinator of BIT that Nicholas Albery came out with the idea of an Institute who would promote all kinds of ideas and experimentation, developed mainly inside what has been called the "Alternative Society".

== Main idea ==
The institute has been known by different names, such as "Institute for Social Innovations", or "Institute for Social Change". All these denominations revolved around the concept of new improvements to be made within the situation of the mainstream society, as it goes at any time to be considered.

== Aftermath ==
It merged with the Global Ideas Bank, formed in 1995.

== See also ==
- Ideas bank
- List of UK think tanks
