= Ira Victor Morris =

American writer

- Born: 1903; Chicago, Illinois
- Died: 1972 (aged 69)
- Education: B.A. Harvard University
- Occupation: Writer
- Spouse: Edita Toll
- Children: Ivan Morris
- Parent(s): Ira Nelson Morris; Constance Lily Rothschild Morris
- Relatives: Nelson Morris (grandfather); Abram M. Rothschild (grandfather); Edward Morris (uncle); Helen Swift Morris (aunt); Muriel Gardiner (cousin); Ruth Morris Bakwin (cousin)

Ira Victor Morris or I.V. Morris (1903–1972) was an American writer and journalist.

== Biography ==
Morris was born in Chicago, Illinois in 1903 to a Jewish family, the son of Constance Lily (née Rothschild) and Ira Nelson Morris. His mother was the daughter of Victor Henry Rothschild; and his father was the son of Nelson Morris, the founder of Morris & Company, one of the three main meat-packing companies in Chicago. He graduated with a B.A. from Harvard University. As his father was a diplomat who was named the Minister to Sweden (1914–1923), the younger Morris was raised abroad. Morris wrote both fiction and non-fiction works which focused on international politics and Americans living abroad. After visiting the countries devastated by World War II, Morris started writing many articles criticizing the conduct of the war and later, the cold war. His wife wrote The Flowers of Hiroshima (1959) which exposed the aftereffects of the bombings of Hiroshima and Nagasaki. They founded the Edita and Ira Morris Hiroshima Foundation for Peace and Culture which assisted victims of the bombings.

== Personal life ==
In February 1925, he married Sweden-native Edita (née Toll). In 1930, she began a long-term affair with fellow Swede and artist, Nils Dardel despite her marriage to Morris (Dardel died in 1943). Their son Ivan Morris was a British author and Japanologist whose third wife was author and theatrical producer Nobuko Uenishi (later married to impresario Donald Albery).

He died in 1972.

== Works ==
- A Tale from the Grave (1926)
- The Kimono (1931)
- The Sampler (1932)
- Covering Two Years (1933)
- Marching Orders (1938)
- The Beautiful Fire (1939)
- Liberty Street (1944)
- Livaaqaa (1944)
- La mort est moins pressée (1947)
- The Tree Within (1948)
- The Chicago Story (1952)
- The Bombay Meeting (1955)
- The Road to Spain (1966)
