= Edita Morris =

Swedish-American writer and activist (1902–1988)

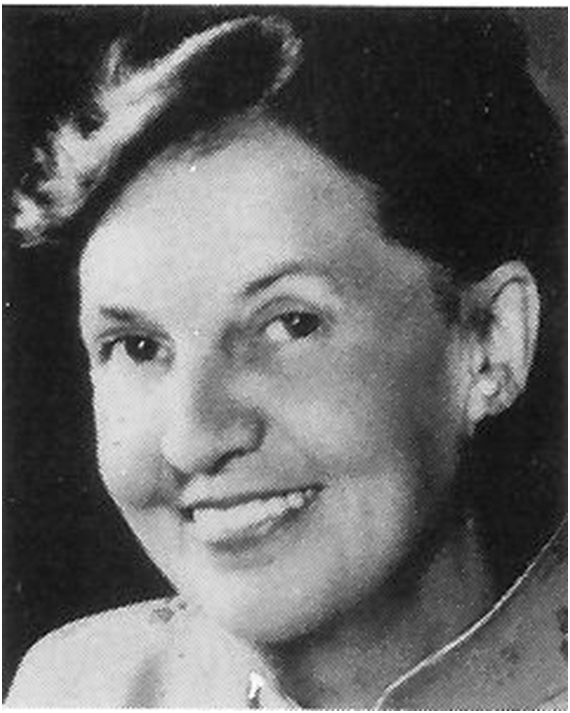
- Born: Edita Dagmar Emilia Toll; 5 March 1902; Örebro, Sweden
- Died: 15 March 1988 (age 86); Paris, France
- Occupations: Writer and political activist
- Spouse: Ira Victor Morris
- Partner: Nils Dardel
- Children: Ivan Morris
- Relatives: Ira Nelson Morris (father-in-law)

Edita Morris (born Edita Dagmar Emilia Toll; 5 March 1902 – 15 March 1988) was a Swedish-American writer and political activist.

== Biography ==
Edita Morris was born in Örebro in Sweden. Her parents were Reinhold Toll, an agronomist who had published books on dairy and cattle farming, and Alma Prom-Möller. The Toll family was well known in Sweden. Her grandfather was a general. She grew up in Stockholm as the youngest of four sisters. When she was still a child her father left the family and emigrated to England.

In 1925, she married the journalist and writer Ira Victor Morris (1903–1972), whose father, Ira Nelson Morris, served as the US envoy in Stockholm; and whose grandfather, Nelson Morris, was the founder of the Chicago meatpacking firm, Morris & Company. He gave them a manor house in the small village of Nesles-la-Gilberde, 60 kilometers outside Paris, France. Ira and Edita had several homes and traveled widely throughout the world. They spent the Second World War years in the United States. They were political activists committed to nuclear disarmament and opposed to many U.S policies of the Cold War.

Morris started her literary career with short stories published in the Atlantic Monthly, Harper's Bazaar and other publications. In 1943, she published her first novel, My Darling from the Lions. In 1930, she began an affair with fellow Swede and artist Nils Dardel, despite her marriage to Morris. The relationship lasted until Dardel's death in 1943 in New York. She figures on many of his paintings from 1930 onwards.

She is mostly known for her novel The Flowers of Hiroshima (1959). The novel was partly influenced by the experiences of her son, Ivan Morris, later a distinguished Japanologist, as an intelligence officer in the U.S. Navy visiting Hiroshima immediately after the dropping of the atomic bomb on the city. The book has been translated into 39 languages. In 1978, she published Straitjacket: autobiography, which was followed in 1983 by a second volume, Seventy Years' War, published in Swedish only under the title Sjuttioåriga kriget.

With her husband, who came from a wealthy family background, she founded a rest house in Hiroshima for victims of the bomb.

After her death, the Edita and Ira Morris Hiroshima Foundation for Peace and Culture, usually known as the Hiroshima Foundation, was established. The purpose of the Foundation is to promote peace by supporting efforts in the cultural sphere to favor peace and reconciliation. The Foundation presents awards to women and men who contribute, in a cultural field, to fostering dialogue, understanding and peace in conflict areas. Morris died in Paris in 1988. She is buried, with her husband and her son, in the village of Nesles.

== Foundation awardees ==
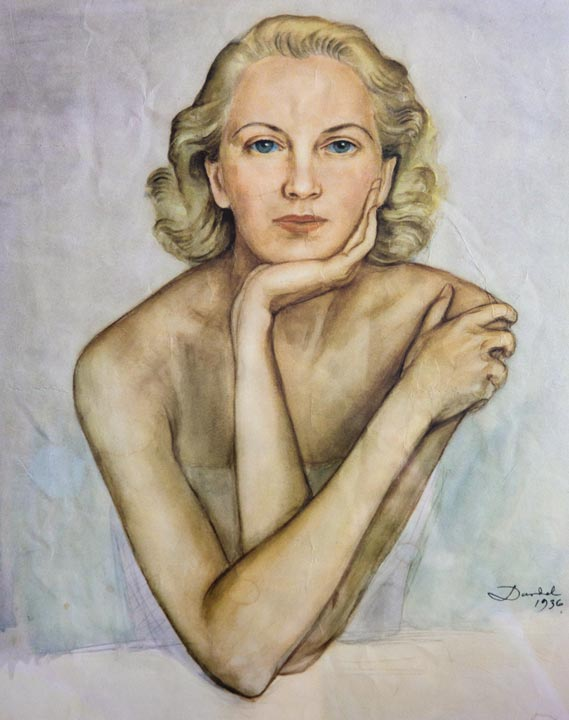
Nils von Dardel: Edita Morris (1936)

The following persons have received awards:

- 2015: Anatoli Mikhailov, professor and founding rector of the European Humanities University, Vilnius, Lithuania.
- 2014: Roméo Dallaire, Canadian general and senator, founder of the Child Soldiers Initiative and author, and Kettly Noël, dancer and choreographer, creator of a centre for African contemporary dance in Bamako, Mali.
- 2010 Kim Longinotto, British documentary filmmaker
- 2008: K.V. Wimalawardana and K. Kumaraveloo, principals of respectively a Sinhalese and a Tamil school in Sri Lanka, for their joint efforts to foster mutual understanding for Sinhalese and Tamil cultures.
- 2006: Elena Nemirovskaya, founder and Director of the Moscow School of Political Studies, for the development of civic culture, political dialogue, deliberative democracy and respect for human rights in Russia and other post-Soviet countries.
- 2004: Borka Pavićević, founder of the Centre for Cultural Decontamination in Belgrade, for her cultural activities to promote tolerance, reconciliation and respect for human rights in the former Yugoslavia; additional awards: Biljana Srbljanović and Jasmina Tesanović, Serbian authors and peace activists.
- 2001: Donald Kenrick, Valdemar Kalinin and Rahim Burhan for their work in promoting understanding for the Roma culture and language.
- 1998: John Kani, playwright and theatre director, for his work with cultural integration in cooperation with people from different ethnic communities, and Antjie Krog, poet and investigating journalist, for her efforts to make the truth and reconciliation process in South Africa understood.
- 1996: Xavier Albó and Félix Layme Pairumani for their work on the Spanish-Quechua and Spanish-Aymara dictionaries in Bolivia and for translating Bolivian and Peruvian laws, and Carolyn Forché, American poet, for her efforts to combat torture and genocide in El Salvador.
- 1995: Akihiro Takahashi, atom bomb survivor and former Head of the Hiroshima Peace Memorial Museum and Director of the Hiroshima Peace Culture Foundation.
- 1994: Aziz Nesin, Turkish writer, for his resistance to political and religious fundamentalism, and Mohamed Talbi, Tunisian historian, for his efforts to promote dialogue between Muslims and Christians.
- 1993: Marion Kane and Vivienne Anderson, for their efforts to promote dialogue between Catholic and Protestant women in Northern Ireland.
- 1992: Sonja Licht for promoting peaceful cooperation between the different communities in former Yugoslavia, and Tanja Petovar, lawyer and human rights activist.
- 1991: Muhammad Abu-Zaid, Palestinian doctor and founder of the Palestinian Centre for Jewish Studies, for his work on promoting cultural understanding as means for peace, and Galit Hasan-Rokem on behalf of the Israeli Women's Peace Net, for their efforts to promote cooperation between Palestinian and Israeli women.
- 1990: Kerstin Blomberg, Swedish district nurse and promoter of international understanding among young persons round the Baltic, Jesús Alcalá, Swedish lawyer and human rights activist, Eva Moberg, Swedish writer and journalist, Harald Ofstad, university professor and philosopher, Peter Watkins, British film director and writer.

== Bibliography of published works ==
English titles only

- Birth of an Old Lady and other short stories (London, 1938)
- My Darling from the Lions (Boston, 1944)
- Charade (New York, 1948); theatrical adaption by Mark Orrin Walker, 1960
- Three who Loved (New York, 1949)
- The Flowers of Hiroshima (New York, 1959)
- Echo in Asia (London, 1961)
- The Toil and the Deed (London, 1963)
- The Seeds of Hiroshima (London, 1965)
- Dear Me and other tales from my native Sweden (New York, 1967)
- Love to Vietnam (New York and London, 1968)
- The Solo Dancer (New York, 1970)
- Life, Wonderful Life (New York, 1971)
- A Happy Day (London 1974), also called Sand
- How Keeping, Hope Fine, first published in French under the title Comment ça va, bien j'espère (Paris, 1975) and in Swedish under the title Hur mår du, hoppas bra (Stockholm, 1977)
- Straitjacket: autobiography (New York, 1978)
- Kill a Beggar (1980), published in Swedish under the title Döda tiggarna
- Seventy Years' War (1980), published in Swedish under the title Sjuttioåriga kriget

== Morris Collection ==
The following published short writings are mentioned in the list of papers within the Morris Collection at Columbia University:

- "After the Ball", short story, in Harper's Bazaar, November 1943
- "Amar-to Love", short story, in Harper's Bazaar, 15 September 1941
- "Auntie Ninna", short story, in Harper's Bazaar, April 1943
- "Ball of Yarn", short story, in Selected Writing, no. 5
- "A Blade of Grass", short story, in Story Magazine, August 1936
- "Caput Mortuum", short story, in Harper's Bazaar, June 1941
- "Dress Rehearsal", short story, in Mademoiselle, April 1943
- "The Gateway to India", short story, in Eastern Horizon, December 1961
- "Heart of Marzipan", short story, in Mademoiselle, October 1943
- "Hiroshima Man", article, in The Mennonite, 25 May 1965
- "Horse with Hoof of Fire", short story, in The New Mexico Quarterly Review, 1945
- "Let's Remember Together", short story, in Good Housekeeping, May 1944
- "Lili Died in April", short story, in Lovat Dickson's Magazine, Vol.3, no. 6, December 1934
- "The Melody", short story, in Mademoiselle, February 1945
- "Nature's Child", short story, in The Reader's Digest, September 1944
- "The Open Mouth", short story, in Harper's Bazaar, July 1943
- 2The Pagan", short story, in Harper's Bazaar, July 1944
- "The Sorrow of Ape-in-pants", short story, in American Dialog, 1964
- "The Survivors of the Bombs", article, in the New Statesman, 2 August 1958
- "Survivors of the Bombs", article, in Opinion, 1961
- "Young Man in an Astrakhan Cap", short story, in Harper's Bazaar, December 1942
