= Leslie Mitchell =

Leslie Mitchell may refer to:

- Leslie Mitchell (historian), English historian
- Leslie Mitchell (broadcaster) (1905–1985), British broadcaster and newsreel commentator
- Les Mitchell, see List of Melbourne Football Club players
- Leslie R. Mitchell, Scouter and radio amateur

== See also ==
- James Leslie Mitchell (1901–1935), Scottish writer better known by his pen name of Lewis Grassic Gibbon
