= Ronnie Bell (chemist) =

British physical chemist (1907–1996)

Ronnie Bell FRS FRSE FRSC
- Born: 24 November 1907; Maidenhead
- Died: 9 January 1996 (aged 88); Kingston Nursing Home, Leeds
- Education: Balliol College, Oxford
- Known for: Physicochemical methods
- Awards: Tilden Prize, Gibbs Prize, Meldola Medal
- Scientific career
- Fields: Physical chemistry
- Institutions: Balliol College, Oxford, University of Stirling
- Doctoral students: John Albery, David Goodall, Alexander George Ogston

Ronald Percy Bell FRS FRSC FRSE (24 November 1907 – 9 January 1996) was a leading British physical chemist who worked in the Physical Chemistry Laboratory at the University of Oxford.

== Life ==
Ronald Percy Bell was the eldest child of Edwin Alfred Bell and his wife Beatrice Annie (née Ash), teachers at an elementary school. He was born on 24 November 1907 at Willowfield, Court House Road, Maidenhead; he had a brother, Kenneth, and an adopted sister, Margaret.

From age 11 Bell attended Maidenhead County Boys’ School, where F. Sherwood Taylor was chemistry master, and a great influence on Bell; from there he went up to Balliol to read chemistry in 1924. Bell obtained a first-class honours degree in 1928. Unusually, he published two papers as sole author in his final year.

Bell was awarded an Oxford University senior studentship in 1928 to work with Brønsted in Copenhagen, and in 1930 the Goldsmiths' Company gave him a senior studentship, enabling him to work on the thermodynamic and kinetic behaviour of non-aqueous solutions. He fell in love with Denmark and its language and became proficient enough to translate books in later life, and to be of value to the Scandinavian Section of the Foreign Research and Press Service during the war.

Bell returned to Balliol in the autumn of 1932 and was awarded a tutorial fellowship there in the following year. He stayed until 1966, having missed election to be Master of Balliol by a narrow margin. Bell's career continued as Professor of Chemistry at the University of Stirling. He and his wife retired to Leeds.

In 1936, Bell was awarded the Meldola Medal and Prize of the Royal Institute of Chemistry and in 1941 he was Tilden Lecturer of the Chemical Society. In 1944, Bell was elected a Fellow of the Royal Society and in 1956 he was elected President of the Faraday Society.

=== Family ===
Ronnie Bell married Margery Mary West on 16 April 1931 in Maidenhead. They lived for the first year or so in a flat in Copenhagen, and then returned to Oxford in 1932. Their only child, Michael, was born there in 1936.

Ronald Percy Bell died on 9 January 1996 at the Kingston Nursing Home in Leeds. Margery died in York on 5 December 1999.

== Publications ==
Bell was the author of The Proton in Chemistry dealing with acid-base reactions. The second edition (1973) was reviewed as giving a comprehensive coverage of proton transfer-equilibrium, chemical kinetics, catalysis, structural and solvent effects, and reaction mechanism, all within 300 pages.

Other publications include:

- Acid-Base Catalysis (1941)
- The Tunnel Effect in Chemistry (1980)
