= Peter Bayley (literary critic) =

English literary critic and academic (1921–2015)

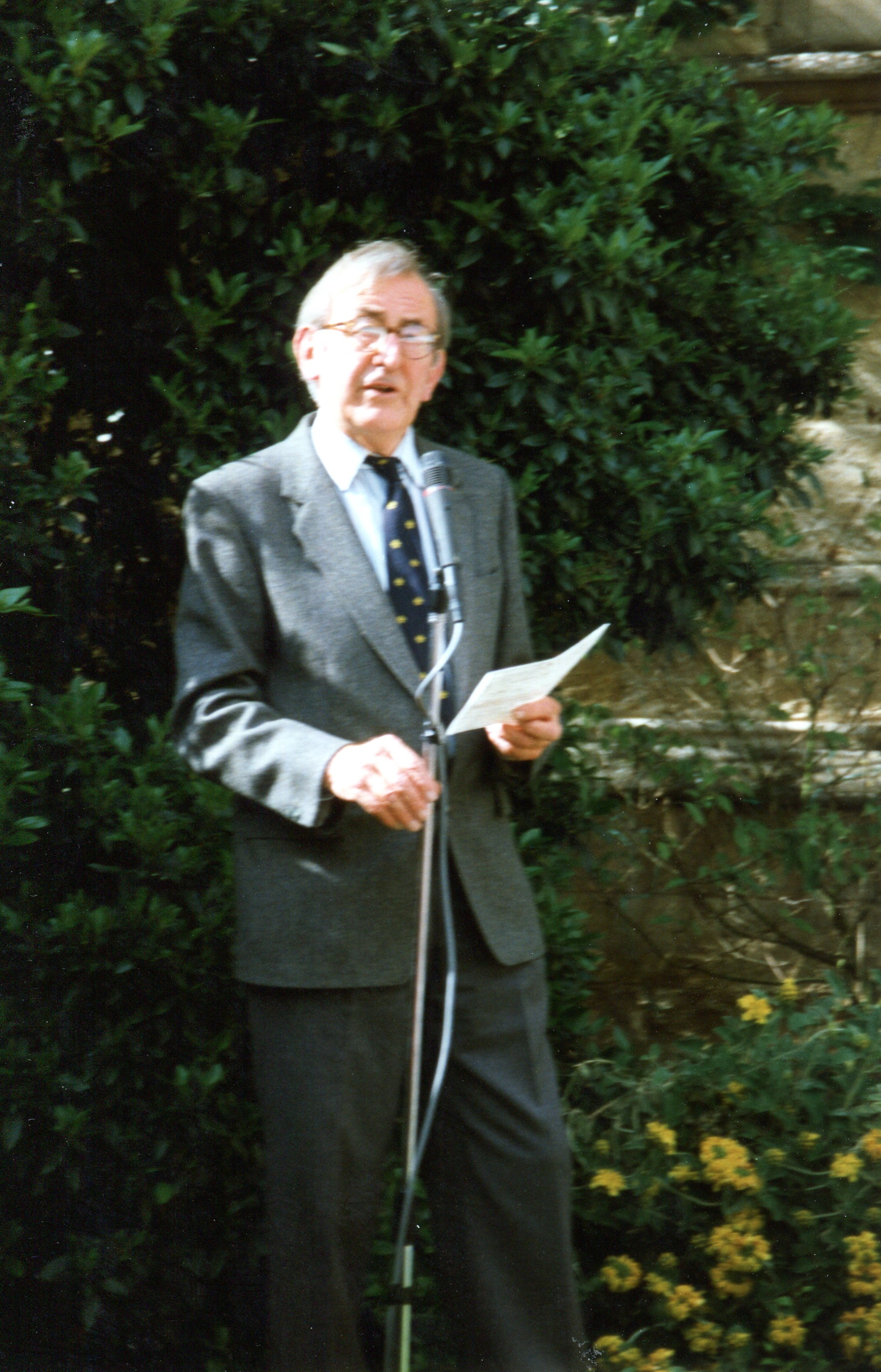
Peter Bayley speaking at University College, Oxford, in 1997

Peter Charles Bayley (25 January 1921 – 3 November 2015) was an English literary critic and academic. He was a fellow at University College, Oxford (1949–1972), the first Principal of Collingwood College, Durham (1972–1978), and Professor of English at the University of St Andrews (1978–1985).

== Early life ==
Bayley was born on 25 January 1921. He was educated at The Crypt School, Gloucester, and University College, Oxford, where he was a Sidwick Exhibitioner (1940–41). He undertook war service during the Second World War (1941–46).

== Academic career ==
He was subsequently a Junior Research Fellow (1947–49), then a Fellow and Praelector in English (1949–72), and Keeper of the College Buildings at University College. Bayley was the tutor of the author V. S. Naipaul who studied at University College in the 1950s. He also edited the University College Record for a number of years. He was made an Emeritus Fellow of the college in 1985.

While a don at Oxford, Bayley oversaw the activities of the Oxford University Dramatic Society (OUDS) and the University College Players. In 1952 he produced He Who Gets Slapped by Leonid Andreyev for University College Players starring a young Maggie Smith as Consuelo. He was a Curator of the University Theatre and Chairman of the University Theatre Appeal Committee.

== Books ==
Bayley was the author of books on Edmund Spenser, 19th century novelists, and John Milton. The Times Literary Supplement wrote of his book on Spenser as being "a packed but lucidly written book which will be of permanent value to all students, and indeed readers, of Spenser".
