= Global Ideas Bank =

UK think tank

The Global Ideas Bank's origins lie in the Institute for Social Inventions, which was set up in 1985 by Nicholas Albery, social inventor and visionary. From small beginnings (a network of inventors, a quarterly newsletter), the Institute grew into a full-fledged organisation under his leadership: producing an annual compendium, running social inventions workshops and promoting creative solutions around the world. It was part of the first European Social Innovations Exchange. In 2001, the institute was awarded a Margaret Mead Special Recognition Award for "community creativity for a new century"

In 1995, the Global Ideas Bank (originally suggested by an American correspondent, Gregory Wright) was first established online, and has since become the name for the entire project's work. Through the work of several volunteer programmers and technical wizards (especially Flemming Funch of the New Civilization Network), new features were added: online submission, voting systems, categorisation, a message board, and so on.

== See also ==
- Ideas bank
- List of UK think tanks
