= Geoff Crowther =

British travel writer (1944–2021)

- Born: 15 March 1944; West Yorkshire, England (Note: The Times states that Crowther was born in Todmorden, but the Financial Times states that he was born in Halifax.)
- Died: 13 April 2021 (aged 77); South East Queensland, Australia
- Education: University of Liverpool
- Occupation: Travel writer
- Organizations: BIT; Lonely Planet
- Spouse: Hyung Poon (m. 1982, divorced) (Note: The Times states that the marriage was dissolved in 1997, but the Financial Times states that the marriage ended in 2000.)
- Children: 1

Geoff Crowther (15 March 1944 – 13 April 2021) was a British travel writer who wrote for BIT and Lonely Planet.

== Life ==
=== Early life ===
Crowther was born in West Yorkshire on 15 March 1944. His parents worked in a cotton mill.

He attended Calder High School, and began hitchhiking around Europe while still a teenager. At the University of Liverpool, he studied biochemistry, and considered staying on to undertake a doctorate, but in the end his desire to travel proved too great.

=== BIT and Lonely Planet ===
In 1972, he joined the alternative information service BIT, where he oversaw the production of Overland to India and Australia. The guide impressed Tony and Maureen Wheeler, and in 1976 they invited him to join Lonely Planet.

=== Personal life ===
He met his first wife, Hyung Poon, whilst working on a guidebook in South Korea. They married in Seoul in 1982, and their son, Ashley, was born in 1989. After their marriage ended, Crowther had a brief second marriage to a woman he met in Kenya, but this also ended in divorce.

=== Final years ===
In 2005, he sustained a head injury in an accident and moved to a residential care facility. He died in South East Queensland on 13 April 2021, at the age of seventy-seven, as a result of complications arising from dementia.

== Notable guidebooks ==
- Africa on the Cheap (1977) ISBN 9780959808087
- South America on a Shoestring (1980) ISBN 9780908086085
- India: A Travel Survival Kit (1981) ISBN 9780908086238
- Malaysia, Singapore & Brunei: A Travel Survival Kit (1982) ISBN 9780908086313
- Korea & Taiwan: A Travel Survival Kit (1982) ISBN 9780908086108
- Africa on a Shoestring (1983) ISBN 9780908086481
- East Africa: A Travel Survival Kit (1987) ISBN 9780864420053
- Morocco, Algeria & Tunisia: A Travel Survival Kit (1989) ISBN 9780864420343
- Kenya: A Travel Survival Kit (1991) ISBN 9780864421036
