= Experimental Theatre Club =

Student dramatic society at the University of Oxford, England

The Experimental Theatre Club (ETC) is a student dramatic society at the University of Oxford, England. It was founded in 1936 by Nevill Coghill as an alternative company to the Oxford University Dramatic Society (OUDS), and produces several productions a year.

The club has staged the first productions of many new works, including Epitaph for George Dillon, written by John Osborne in 1957 and directed by Don Taylor.

== Etceteras ==
ETC was home to Oxford's student revue company, the Etceteras – by the early 1970s a rather poor relation of the Cambridge Footlights. Then, in 1975, two figures who would together become major players in TV and film comedy met after answering an advert to join the Etceteras revue-writing team. They were Richard Curtis and Rowan Atkinson – a graduate engineering student who made his memorable Oxford debut in a Leapyear Revue at the Oxford Playhouse on 29 February 1976, directed by Etceteras president, Robert Orchard. Curtis had already taken his own first bow in another show by the same director, "Allswellthatendsrock!". From 1977 to 1981, Paul Twivy and Ian Hislop then took over the Etceteras, producing several shows at the Edinburgh Festival and Oxford Playhouse.

ETC funded the Etceteras' first major revue in years, "After Eights" at the Oxford Playhouse in May 1976, featuring Atkinson, Curtis, Robin Seavill and others, with material written by the cast, director Andrew Rissik, John Albery, Orchard, Iain Moss and other contributors.

(Note: The Etceteras' brief as part of ETC was to stage regular revues in Oxford, while the show performed at the annual Edinburgh Festival Fringe as the Oxford Revue was produced and funded by the separate Oxford Theatre Group (OTG), which also took several plays to the Fringe. Today's thriving Oxford Revue company combines both roles.)

== Alumni ==
People who have contributed to ETC productions include:

- John Albery
- Rowan Atkinson
- Lindsay Anderson
- Alan Bennett
- Richard Curtis
- Michael Flanders
- Piers Fletcher
- Philip Franks
- Howard Goodall
- Tom Hooper
- Ian Hislop
- Terry Jones
- Ken Loach (President)
- David Marks
- John McGrath (playwright)
- Dudley Moore
- Robert Orchard
- Michael Palin
- Diana Quick
- Tony Richardson
- Andrew Rissik
- John Schlesinger (President)
- Robin Seavill
- Don Taylor
- Noel Kershaw
- Herbert Chappell
- Jeremy Treglown
- Kenneth Tynan (President)
- Samuel West (President)
- Sandy Wilson
- David Wood

Visiting directors include Peter Hall and Terry Hands.

== See also ==
- The Oxford Revue
- Oxford University Dramatic Society (OUDS)

== Bibliography ==
- Glynne Wickham, A Revolution in Attitudes to the Dramatic Arts in British Universities, 1880–1980. Oxford Review of Education, Vol. 3, No. 2 (1977), pp. 115–121 JSTOR
- Roderick Robertson, University Theatre at Oxford. Educational Theatre Journal, Vol. 8, No. 3 (October 1956), pp. 194–206 JSTOR
