= Nicholas Albery =

British social inventor and author (1948–2001)

- Born: Nicholas Bronson Albery; 28 July 1948; St Albans, Hertfordshire, England
- Died: 3 June 2001 (aged 52); England
- Education: St John's College, Oxford
- Occupation(s): Social inventor and author
- Parent(s): Cicely and Donald Albery
- Relatives: Bronson Albery (grandfather); Tim Albery (brother); Ivan Albery Powell (nephew)

Nicholas Bronson Albery (28 July 1948 – 3 June 2001) was a British social inventor and author, was the instigator or coordinator of a variety of projects aimed at an improvement to society, often known as the alternative society.

== Early life and education ==
Albery was born at Bricket House, St Albans, Hertfordshire, son of the theatre impresario Sir Donald Albery (son of Sir Bronson Albery, also a theatre impresario) and his second wife, Cicely, daughter of Army officer Reginald Harvey Henderson Boys.

While a student at St John's College, Oxford, Albery became involved with psychedelic and spiritual movements in San Francisco, California, and dropped out of college. After a period in Haight Ashbury, he returned to the UK and joined the anti-university in London.

== Life ==
=== BIT ===
Albery became involved with the newly started BIT Information Service, quickly becoming a driving force in the development of wider activities for BIT so that it became one of the first social centres. Around 1972/73, at the peak of its activities and with the momentum given by Albery, BIT Info-Service ran 24 hours a day, with "BIT-workers" coming up at around 10 PM to take the night shift until around 8:00 AM the following day.

=== The "Windsor Festival case" ===
In 1974, in the aftermath of a violent attack by police on the Windsor Free Festival, Albery, with playwright Heathcote Williams and his partner Diana Senior successfully sued David Holdsworth, the Thames Valley Chief Constable, for creating a riotous situation in which the police attacked the plaintiffs.

=== Frestonia ===
Albery was a Minister for the Free State of Frestonia in North Kensington and a Green Party candidate in Notting Hill.

=== Social innovations' activist ===
In 1985, out of BIT Information Service, Albery founded the Institute for Social Inventions. From small beginnings (a network of inventors, a quarterly newsletter), the Institute grew into a full-fledged organisation under his leadership: producing an annual compendium, running social inventions workshops and promoting creative solutions around the world. The Institute included Edward de Bono, Anita Roddick and Fay Weldon among its patrons.

The Global Ideas Bank, which Albery founded in 1995 as an offspring of the Institute for Social Inventions, was first established online, and new features were added: online submission, voting systems, categorisation, a message board, and so on.

=== Promoting "natural" death ===
Albery became interested in ecological approaches to death and funerals, and in breaking the taboos that surround death in western societies. In 1991, with Christianne Heal, he and his wife founded the Natural Death Centre, offering advice on DIY burials.The much-patronised centre provides midwives for the dying, death exercises, recyclable coffins, etc.

=== Saturday Walkers' Club ===
Albery founded the self-organising Saturday Walkers' Club in the mid-1990s.

== Personal life and death ==
Albery was married to psychotherapist Josefine Speyer. He died age 52 in a car accident, on 3 June 2001. His brother is stage director Tim Albery.

== Works ==
Incomplete list:

- Beam, Alan; Morrison, Pete (1976). Rehearsal for the Year 2000: (drugs, Religions, Madness, Crime, Communes, Love, Visions, Festivals and Lunar Energy) : the Rebirth of Albion Free State (known in the Dark Ages as England) : Memoirs of a Male Midwife (1966-1976). London: Revelaction Press. ISBN 978-0-9505244-0-5.

an account of the early years of BIT, by Nicholas Albery, with most names changed to protect the innocent

- Albery, Nicholas. Poem for the Day: One. Nicholas Albery Foundation. "With a foreword by Wendy Cope."
- Albery, Nicholas (1979). Co-op Year 2000: The Nuts & Bolts of Caring & Sharing. Nicholas Albery.
- Albery, Nicholas; Ratcliffe, Peter (1993). Social Innovations: A Compendium : the Latest Ideas and Award-winning Schemes from The Institute for Social Inventions. Institute for Social Inventions. ISBN 978-0-948826-30-6.
