= Oxford University Dramatic Society =

Oxford University theatre club

- Founded: 1884
- President: Sanaa Pasha
- Website: www.oxforduniversitydramaticsociety.com

The Oxford University Dramatic Society ('OUDS - O.U.D.S) is the principal funding body and provider of theatrical services to the many independent student productions put on by students in Oxford, England. Not all student productions at Oxford University are awarded funding from the society. However it is rare, for example, for any student production at the Oxford Playhouse not to receive substantial funding from the society. The society funds many types of shows, mostly at the Oxford Playhouse, Burton Taylor Theatre, and the individual college theatres such as the Michael Pilch Studio at Balliol, Moser Theatre at Wadham and the O'Reilly Theatre at Keble. All productions put on by Oxford University students can use the society's services, such as the website, the auditions portal, and advice from the committee, providing their production company is registered.

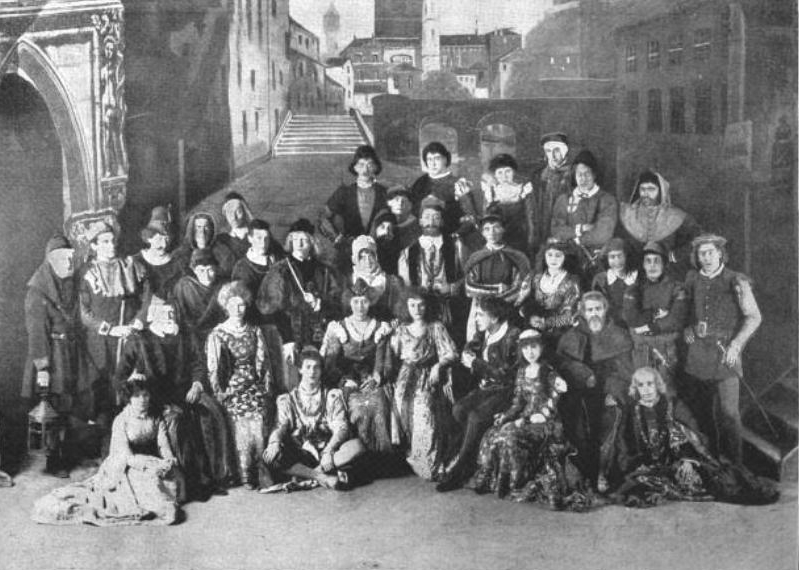
The company in 1898

The Society supports a competition for Freshers (Cuppers), held in Michaelmas Term and a New Writing Festival in Hilary Term. OUDS also supports an annual National UK Tour, which has culminated in a long run at the Edinburgh Festival Fringe in the past. Previously, the society has also facilitated a Shakespeare production, jointly with Thelma Holt, touring Japan, with preview performances in the UK.

The society was founded in November 1884 by Arthur Bourchier, James Granville Adderley, and Alan MacKinnon, and its first production, Henry IV, Part 1, opened in May 1885.

During World War I, when some 200 Belgian refugees came to Oxford, the society lent its room to a "Belgian Club".

== Alumni ==
Many famous actors have participated in OUDS productions. For example, in 1907 professional actresses Lily Brayton and her sister Agnes appeared as Katherine and Bianca in The Taming of the Shrew. John Gielgud made his directing debut at OUDS in 1932 with a production of Romeo and Juliet in which he enlisted professional actresses Peggy Ashcroft to play Juliet and Edith Evans to play the Nurse. Another notable production was when Richard Burton and Elizabeth Taylor appeared in a production of Dr. Faustus in 1966 with undergraduates in the supporting cast.

Past members and people associated with OUDS productions include:

- Paul Almond
- Lindsay Anderson
- Andrew Havill
- Gethin Anthony
- Pierre Audi
- Rowan Atkinson
- Helen Atkinson-Wood
- Peter Bayley
- Timothy Bateson
- John Betjeman
- Will Bowen
- Gyles Brandreth
- Richard Burton
- Kate Beckinsale
- Eve Best
- Shirley Catlin
- Caryl Churchill
- Michael Codron
- Alex Cox
- Jonathan Cullen
- Richard Curtis
- Thomas de Mallet Burgess
- George Devine
- Edith Evans
- Felix Felton
- Oliver Ford Davies
- Philip Franks
- Patrick Garland
- William Gaskill
- John Gielgud
- Peter Glenville
- Hugh Grant
- Tom Hooper
- Arthur Hutchinson
- David Jessel
- Felicity Jones
- Peter Kosminsky
- Nigel Lawson
- Harry Lloyd
- John Maud
- David Melamed
- Ariane Mnouchkine
- Dudley Moore
- Stanley Myers
- Terence O'Brien
- Norman Painting
- Katherine Parkinson
- Roger Parry
- Rosamund Pike
- Esther Rantzen
- Diana Quick*
- Gervais Rentoul
- Gillian Reynolds*
- Tony Richardson
- John Schlesinger
- Thea Sharrock
- Maggie Smith
- Mel Smith
- Imogen Stubbs
- Mabel Terry-Lewis
- Kenneth Tynan
- John Veale (incidental music)
- Evelyn Waugh
- David William
- Emlyn Williams
- John Wood
- Dornford Yates
- Owain Yeoman
- Michael York

* Note that women could not formally join OUDS until 1963. Diana Quick was the first female OUDS President.

== See also ==
- Experimental Theatre Club (ETC)
- The Oxford Revue
- University College Players
