= He Who Gets Slapped =

1915 play by Leonid Andreyev

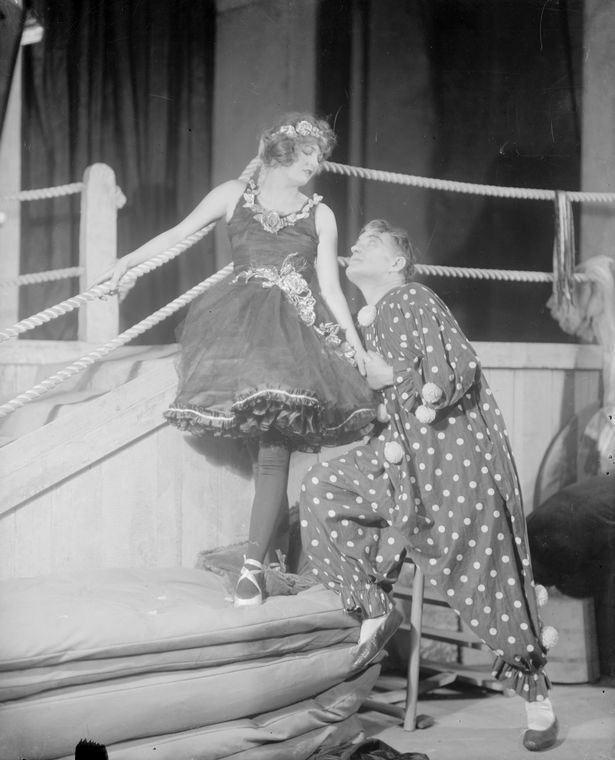
- Margalo Gillmore (Consuelo) & Richard Bennett (He) in the English-language adaptation of He Who Gets Slapped at the Garrick Theatre on Broadway
- Original language: Russian
- Written by: Leonid Andreyev
- Genre: Symbolist drama

Premiere
- Date: 27 October 1915
- Place: Moscow Art Theatre

He Who Gets Slapped (Russian: Тот, кто получает пощёчины, romanized: Tot, kto poluchayet poshchochiny) is a play in four acts by Russian dramatist Leonid Andreyev; completed in August 1915 and first produced in that same year at the Moscow Art Theatre on October 27, 1915. Immensely popular with Russian audiences, the work received numerous stagings throughout the Russian-speaking world in the two decades after its premiere, and then later enjoyed a resurgence of popularity in the 1970s and 1980s in Russian theaters. The work is still part of the dramatic repertory in Russian-speaking countries. While well-liked by the public, critical reaction to the work was initially negative in Russia. It was later reevaluated as a masterwork of Russian drama, and is regarded as Andreyev's finest achievement among his 25 plays.

The play is representative of Andreyev's "panpsyche theatre" in which the plot focuses on developing the internal, psychological and intellectual aspects of characters over external action. Set inside a circus within a French city, the play's main character is a mysterious 39-year-old stranger (referred to as "He"; Russian тот, tot, "that one") whose name is never revealed to the audience. "He" is fleeing a failed marriage and joins the circus as a clown. "He" falls in love with the horse rider Consuelo, the daughter of Count Mancini. The Count pushes Consuelo into marrying Baron Regnard for financial gain. "He" poisons Consuelo, Baron Regnard commits suicide in despair, and then "He" drinks the poison himself at the end.

On the international stage, the play became Andreyev's most successful in the United States, being popular with both audiences and critics when it was staged on Broadway at the Garrick Theatre in 1922 in a production mounted by the Theatre Guild. That production used an English language translation of the original Russian by the psychoanalyst Gregory Zilboorg which was first published in 1921. The play has been staged in multiple languages internationally, but is most often performed in English outside of Russia. A 1944 English translation made for The Old Vic by Judith Guthrie reduced the structure of the play to two acts instead of four. This version was used for the 1946 Broadway revival, the 1947 West End production, and several other stagings in the United States and United Kingdom during the 20th century.

The success of the stage play in the US led to the development of Victor Sjöström's critically successful 1924 silent film of the same name which was notably the first film ever made by Metro-Goldwyn-Mayer. Besides this film, the play has been adapted many times, including an earlier Russian film in 1916, a Swedish film in 1926, a novel in 1925, an opera in 1956, a 1961 television film, and a musical in 1971.

== Roles ==
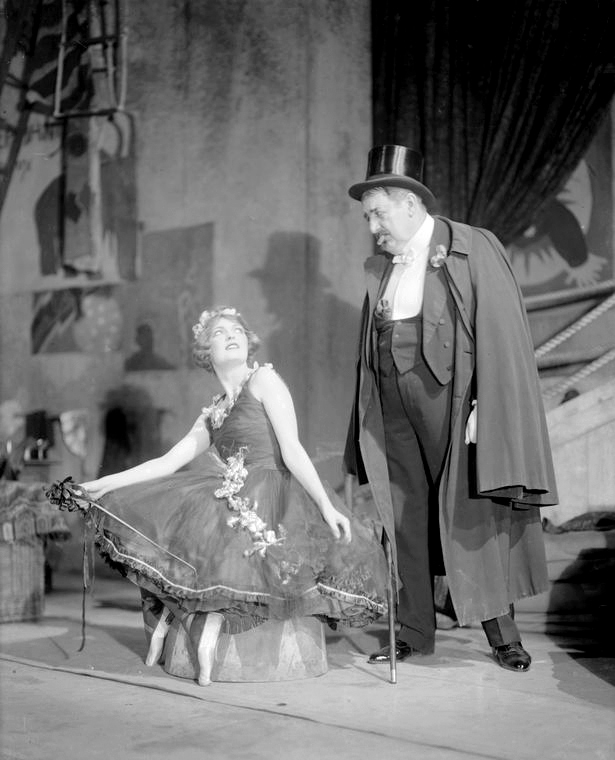
Margalo Gillmore (Consuelo) and Louis Calvert (Baron Regnard) in the 1922 Broadway production

Roles, Cast of the Broadway premiere
Role	Cast of the Broadway premiere, January 9, 1922 – May 20, 1922
"He", mysterious stranger (sometimes modified to "Funny")	Richard Bennett
"Gentleman", mysterious stranger and acquaintance of "He"	John Blair
Consuelo, a horseback rider	Margalo Gillmore
Baron Regnard, wealthy patron	Louis Calvert
Count Mancini, Consuelo's father	Frank Reicher
Papa Briquet, owner of the circus	Ernest Cossart
Zinida, a lion tamer	Helen Westley
Alfred Bezano, jockey and Consuelo's lover	John Rutherford
Jackson, a clown	Henry Travers
Tilly, musical clown	Philip Leigh
Polly, musical clown	Edgar Stehli
Angelica, circus performer	Helen Sheridan
Francois, circus performer	Sears Taylor
Wardrobe Lady	Katherine Wilson
Usher	Charles Cheltenham
Conductor	William Crowell
Pierre, circus performer	Philip Loeb
A Sword Dancer	Julia Cobb
Ballet Master	Francis C. Sadtler
Ballet dancers	Helen Stokes; Barbara Kitson; Frances Ryan

== Plot ==
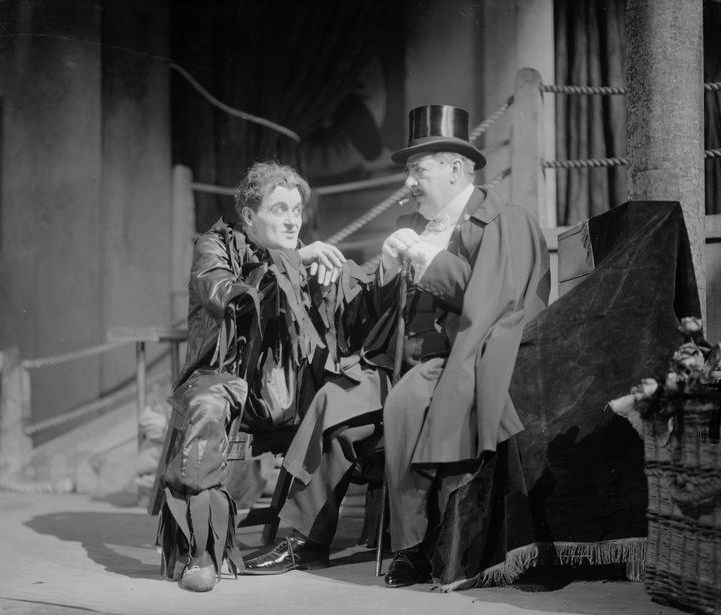
Richard Bennett as "He" (left) & Louis Calvert as Baron Regnart (right) in the 1922 Broadway production

The action takes place within a circus in a large city in France. In the opening scene a mysterious man, "He", approaches the circus performers and requests to join the troupe as a clown. Uncertain, the circus members recognize that the man is well educated and cultured by his speech and manner, but believe he may be an alcoholic. To win their approval, "He" suggests that his part in the circus act could be receiving slaps from the other clowns, and that his circus name could be "He Who Gets Slapped". Andreyev's script keeps the audience guessing over the identity of "He", and information is divulged piecemeal over the course of the play's four acts. This construct keeps the psychological aspects of the play at the center, as the audience is constantly trying to figure out what is motivating the central character.

=== First act ===
Papa Briquet, the owner of the circus, asks to see "He"'s identification in order to register his employment with the government. "He" discloses his name into Papa Briquet's ear, without revealing it to the audience. The reaction of the circus owner reveals that "He" is famous and respected, but the audience gains no further knowledge of the character other than he is 39 years old.

=== Second act ===
"He" is an established clown in Briquet's circus and his act has been a huge success, bringing financial prosperity to the circus troupe. However, the other performers warn "He" against talking too much about controversial political and religious topics during his act. "He" falls in love with the horseback rider Consuelo, but her father, Count Mancini, is intent on marrying his daughter to Baron Regnard for his money. At the end of this act a second mysterious man, known only as the "Gentleman", arrives. It is revealed that the "Gentleman", a former close friend of "He", is the cause of "He"'s marital problems, as the "Gentleman" had an affair with "He"'s wife and they now have a son. The Gentleman in hopes of repairing their relationship has been searching all over Europe for "He" for months, as his friend disappeared mysteriously after leaving an angry letter.

=== Third act ===
It is revealed that the "Gentleman" is now married to "He"'s former wife, and that he wrote a highly successful book about his affair with her that has made the "Gentleman" rich and famous. The Gentleman appears regularly in the press with his wife and son. "He" vows never to return to his former life, and the Gentleman leaves. "He" focuses his attention on Consuelo, and makes an unsuccessful attempt to sabotage her engagement to Baron Regnard.

=== Fourth act ===
"He" poisons Consuelo in order to prevent her from marrying Baron Regnard and she dies. The Baron immediately commits suicide (offstage). Finally, "He" takes the poison as well, and dies.

== Composition and performance history in Russian ==
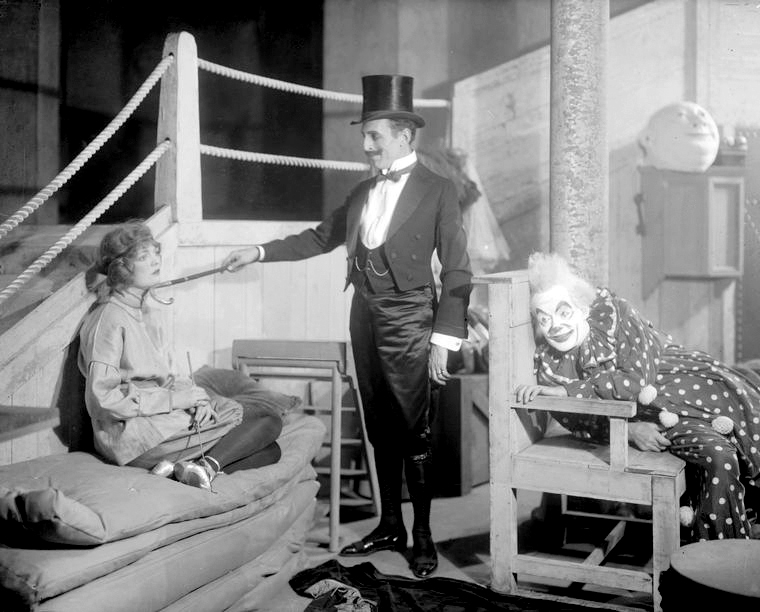
Margalo Gillmore, Frank Reicher and Richard Bennett in the 1922 Broadway production

In a letter to S. S. Goloushev of September 10, 1915. Leonid Andreev writes: "Since August 17–18, among the pains and other things, I sat down to work," and names among other works completed during this time "He Who Gets Slaps" – "a large 4-act play for the Drama Theater. It will be great to play and watch!" The initial staging of the play at the Moscow Drama Theater was very important to Andreev: in the fall of 1915 he specially came to Moscow to be present at the rehearsals, and even earlier he wrote a number of letters to some actors of this theater, in which he gave detailed explanations of the play. He pays particular attention in his comments to the character of Consuelo. In a letter to the actress E.A.Polevitskaya September 28, 1915, he stressed that the disclosure of his "one of the most important tasks of the artist and director: to show the goddess under the tinsel jockey and acrobat."

The work premiered at the Moscow Art Theatre on October 27, 1915 to tepid critical reviews, but tremendous popularity with audiences who applauded continuously through fourteen curtain calls. The production marked the professional debut of lauded Russian actress Faina Ranevskaya who portrayed one of the smaller roles. The Alexandrinsky Theatre staged the work the following month (premiere November 27, 1915) in a staging by Nikolai Vasilyevich Petrov. Numerous productions of the work were presented in Russia and Estonia over the next two decades, including performances in Kiev, Syzran, Voronezh, and Tallinn among others.

The play received a resurgence of popularity in the Russian speaking world in the 1970s and 1980s, with productions mounted at the Russian Theatre, Tallinn, Saint Petersburg Lensoviet Theatre, and the Russian Army Theatre among others. In 2002, visiting Finnish director Raija-Sinikka Rantala staged the play at the Moscow Art Theater. The title role was played by Viktor Gvozditsky, to whose 50th anniversary the premiere of the play was timed. In 2020, Moscow director Natalia Lyudskova staged the play at the Pushkin State Drama Theatre Kursk.

== International performances in other languages ==
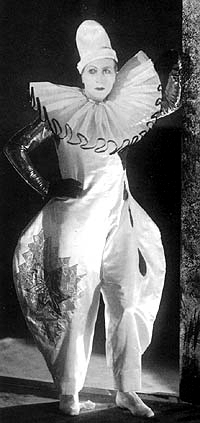
Swedish actor Gösta Ekman as "He" in 1926

In 1919 the play was given its first staging in France at the Théâtre des Arts in Paris. The production was directed by Georges Pitoëff who also wrote the French language translation of the play. His wife, Ludmilla Pitoëff, portrayed Consuelo in the production. That same year the play had its United States debut in the Yiddish language with Jacob Ben-Ami as "He" at the New Yiddish Theater (in Yiddish, Dos Naye Yidisher) in New York City. Ben-Ami would go on to perform the role in Yiddish and English in multiple production in the United States and Canada into the 1930s, including a 1929 production at the Cleveland Play House which became entangled in a highly publicized labor dispute.

In March 1921 an American magazine, The Dial, published an English-language translation of the play by the psychoanalyst Gregory Zilboorg after his translation drew the attention of the magazine's editor, the poet Marianne Moore. Well received, that translation has been republished 17 times since that initial publication. That translation was used for what was billed as the United States premiere (but really the English language premiere) of the play on January 9, 1922 at Broadway's Garrick Theatre. It remained there until February 13, 1922, when it transferred to the Fulton Theatre for performances through May 20, 1922. The production then moved back to the Garrick Theatre, where it continued to play through September 30, 1922, closing after a total of 308 performances. Starring Richard Bennett, the production earned glowing reviews in The New York Times.

Following the Broadway production, producer Sam H. Harris mounted a national tour of the production which was directed by Joseph Gaites and was headlined once again by Richard Bennett. Among the tour's stops were the Hollis Street Theatre in Boston in November 1922; a 10 week run at the Playhouse Theatre (now Fine Arts Building) in Chicago in December 1922 through February 1923; and the Auditorium Theatre in Baltimore in October 1923. Several more stagings of the play in English followed, including a production at the Le Petit Theatre du Vieux Carre in New Orleans (1924). The work was regularly staged in American regional theaters during the 1920s and 1930s when Andreev was at his height of popularity in the United States; during which time his works were banned in the Soviet Union.

In 1926 the Austrian premiere was given at the Modernes Theater Wien in Vienna in 1926. That same year the play was mounted for the first time in the United Kingdom at the Birmingham Repertory Theatre with Stanley Lathbury as "He", Ralph Richardson as "Gentleman", Muriel Hewitt as Consuella, Alan Howland as Polly, and Edward Chapman as Tilly using an English language translation by Gertrude Schurhoff and Sir Barry V. Jackson; the latter of whom directed the production. In 1927 the play was mounted in London for the first time at the Everyman Theatre in Hampstead with Milton Rosmer as "He", Frederick Lloyd as "Gentleman", Gabrielle Casartelli as Consuelo, Dorie Sawyer as Zinida, Godfrey Baxter as Alfred Bezano, and Brember Wills as Mancini. In 1929 it was staged at the Oxford Playhouse for the first time. In 1952 that theater mounted the work again in a celebrated revival directed by Oliver Marlow Wilkinson with David March as "He", Susan Dowdall as Consuelo, John McKelvey as Briquet, Hugh Manning as Count Mancini, Mary Savidge as Zinida, and Ronnie Barker as Polly.

In 1944 the play was staged at the Liverpool Playhouse by The Old Vic whose players had relocated to Liverpool from London during World War II due to The Blitz. Directed and produced by Tyrone Guthrie, it used a new English language translation divided into two Acts instead of four by Guthrie’s wife, Judith Guthrie, and was performed under the title Uneasy Laughter. The character of "He", played by Old Vic's director Peter Glenville, was renamed Funny in this version. Other cast member included Audrey Fildes as Consuelo, Eileen Herlie as Zinida, Arnold Marlé as Briquet, Noel Willman as Count Mancini, Scott Forbes as Bezano, Percy Heming as Jackson, and Henry Edwards as Baron Reynard.

Both Guthries were utilized again for a Broadway revival staged by The Theatre Guild in 1946. The production starred John Abbott as Count Mancini, John Wengraf as Baron Reynard, Susan Douglas Rubeš as Consuelo, Stella Adler as Zinaida, Wolfe Barzell as Papa Briquet, Reinhold Schünzel as Baron Regnard, Russell Collins as Jim Jackson, and John M. O'Connor as Polly. Douglas won a Donaldson Award for her portrayal.

In 1947 the play was staged for the first time in London’s West End at the Duchess Theatre under the artistic direction of Robert Helpmann and Michael Benthall; once again using Guthrie’s two act version of the play. Helpmann portrayed Funny ("He"), with Audrey Fildes as Consuelo, Margaret Diamond as Zinida, Arnold Marlé as Briquet, Ernest Milton as Count Mancini, Leonard White as Bezano, Stanley Ratcliffe as Jackson, Alfie Bass as Tilly, Peter Varley as Polly, and Basil Coleman as "Gentleman".

In 1951 the play was mounted using Guthrie’s adaptation at the Watergate Theatre, London with Brian Cobby as Bezano. In 1952 literary critic Peter Bayley directed a production of the play for University College Players starring a young Maggie Smith as Consuelo. In 1958 a second national tour starring Alfred Drake as "He" toured the United States. In 1964 the Hampstead Theatre staged the work with Vladek Sheybal as "He", Tristram Jellinek as Mancini, and Jo Maxwell-Muller as Consuelo. In 1985 the play was staged at the Riverside Studios.

In 1995 the Hudson Theater won an Ovation Award for their production of the play which was directed by Dan Shor and starred Bud Cort as "He". A critically acclaimed production directed by and starring Yuri Belov with a new English translation by Belov was staged at the Ivy Substation in Culver City, California in 1997.

== Critical reception ==
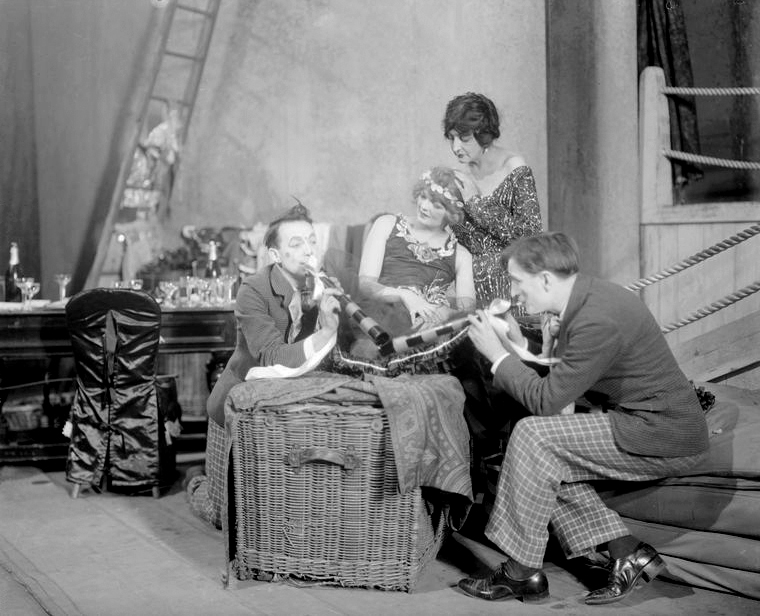
Margalo Gillmore (centre, seated) as Consuelo, Helen Westley (Zinida), Philip Leigh and Edgar Stehli (Tilly and Polly, musical clowns) in the 1922 Broadway production

The first two productions, both Moscow and Petrograd, were, according to theater chronicles and recollections of contemporaries, a great success with the audience. The actor llarion Nikolaevich Pevtsov in the leading role of "He" in both productions was praised universally by critics and audiences. However, criticism was mostly negative about the play at the time of its premiere with the playwright being accused of "hodgepodge" and "derivation". Russian critic Alexander Kugel, who usually championed Andreev's plays, gave a cold review of the play, reproaching the author's lack of clear thought, which is replaced here by many contradictory "ideas", and the abuse of external stage effects. Critic S. Goloushev was more complimentary of the play and speaks of "He" as a role that requires a tragic actor of Chaliapin's scale for its performance. In his article he points to the essential conflict underlying this drama – "a masquerade where everyone's mask is fused to his skin... 'He' is again a Man with a capital letter, and again next to him is a gentleman, a man of little 'h'. Again a clash of personality and crowd, of greatness of spirit and vulgarity. The personality is defeated. Everything he had lived with has been taken from him."

The Russian poet Fyodor Sologub was one of the work's champions. In his analysis the main character "He" is "revealing of the clear outlines of an ancient myth under the guise of reality we are experiencing. Thoth, is an envoy of another, higher world, the Creator of ideas, who descended to the circus arena, again took on his humiliated appearance, a rabbit's eyesight, voclauned, to again accept the sourdough. Consuella is "the daughter of the people, the soul of simple-minded humanity, the charming Psyche... And the eternal story of the innocent soul, seduced by the eternal Defiler, is repeated."

Current assessment of He Who Gets Slapped among Russian writers is much more positive, with scholars on Andreev contending that initial criticism misinterpreted the nature of conventionality in Andreev's writing. Contemporary playwright Victoria Nikiforova notes: "Leonid Andreev's play should appeal to lovers of indie melodramas and Emmerich Kálmán's operettas. He Who Gets Slapped anticipated the plot of Die Zirkusprinzessin ten years earlier and the heated atmosphere of Seeta Aur Geeta by fifty."

Critical assessment in the US was positive from its initial presentation in English in 1922. Russian studies academic Frederick H. White writes, "Andreev’s play about betrayal and revenge, seemingly, struck a chord with modern industrial America, during the unscrupulous Gilded Age of robber barons and a period of great social change due to a rapidly increasing immigrant population, a period in American history when the circus crisscrossed the country providing a vivid cultural window into this era’s complex and volatile web of historical changes."

== Adaptations ==
He Who Gets Slapped (full film)

- 1915, Russian film He Who Gets Slapped is released.
- 1924, American film He Who Gets Slapped is released by MGM.
- 1925, George A. Carlin's novel He Who Gets Slapped is published.
- 1926, Swedish film He Who Gets Slapped is released.
- 1947, Argentine film El que recibe las bofetadas.
- 1956, Robert Ward and Bernard Stambler's opera He Who Gets Slapped premieres at Lincoln Center.
- 1961, a television film for The Play of the Week starring Richard Basehart and Julie Harris
- 1971, an Off-Broadway musical adaptation entitled Nevertheless, They Laugh by composer Richard Lescsak and writer LaRue Watts is mounted at the Lamb's Theatre in New York city with stars David Holliday and Bernadette Peters.
