= SS Ira Nelson Morris =

World War II Liberty ship of the United States

History

United States
- Name: Ira Nelson Morris
- Namesake: Ira Nelson Morris
- Ordered: as type (EC2-S-C1) hull, MC hull 2387
- Builder: J.A. Jones Construction, Brunswick, Georgia
- Cost: $866,952
- Yard number: 172
- Way number: 2
- Laid down: 26 October 1944
- Launched: 25 November 1944
- Sponsored by: Constance Lily Morris
- Completed: 8 December 1944
- Identification: Call Signal: ANBG
- Fate: Laid up in the National Defense Reserve Fleet, Hudson River Group, 27 April 1946; Laid up in the National Defense Reserve Fleet, Suisun Bay Group, 12 October 1948; Sold for scrapping, 2 November 1965

General characteristics
- Class & type: Liberty ship; type EC2-S-C1, standard
- Tonnage: 10,865 LT DWT; 7,176 GRT
- Displacement: 3,380 long tons (3,434 t) (light); 14,245 long tons (14,474 t) (max)
- Length: 441 feet 6 inches (135 m) oa; 416 feet (127 m) pp; 427 feet (130 m) lwl
- Beam: 57 feet (17 m)
- Draft: 27 ft 9.25 in (8.4646 m)
- Installed power: 2 × Oil fired 450 °F (232 °C) boilers, operating at 220 psi (1,500 kPa); 2,500 hp (1,900 kW)
- Propulsion: 1 × triple-expansion steam engine, (manufactured by General Machinery Corp., Hamilton, Ohio); 1 × screw propeller
- Speed: 11.5 knots (21.3 km/h; 13.2 mph)
- Capacity: 562,608 cubic feet (15,931 m^{3}) (grain); 499,573 cubic feet (14,146 m^{3}) (bale)
- Complement: 38–62 USMM; 21–40 USNAG
- Armament: Varied by ship; Bow-mounted 3-inch (76 mm)/50-caliber gun; Stern-mounted 4-inch (102 mm)/50-caliber gun; 2–8 × single 20-millimeter (0.79 in) Oerlikon anti-aircraft (AA) cannons and/or, 2–8 × 37-millimeter (1.46 in) M1 AA guns

SS Ira Nelson Morris was a Liberty ship built in the United States during World War II. She was named after Ira Nelson Morris, the US Minister to Sweden (1914–1923), he also saved 19 year old Ellen Neilson aboard the Scandinavian America Line liner United States in 1921, from being washed overboard.

== Construction ==
Ira Nelson Morris was laid down on 26 October 1944, under a United States Maritime Commission (MARCOM) contract, MC hull 2387, by J.A. Jones Construction, Brunswick, Georgia; she was sponsored by Constance Lily Morris, widow of the namesake, and launched on 25 November 1944.

== History ==
She was allocated to Seas Shipping Co., Inc., on 8 December 1944. On 27 April 1946, she was laid up in the National Defense Reserve Fleet, in the Hudson River Group. On 12 October 1948, she was laid up in the National Defense Reserve Fleet, in the Suisun Bay Group. On 2 November 1965, she was sold for $48,398.18, to National Metal & Scrap Corp., for scrapping. She was removed from the fleet on 22 November 1965.

== Bibliography ==
- "Jones Construction, Brunswick GA". ShipbuildingHistory.com. 13 October 2010.
- "Liberty Ships – World War II".
- Maritime Administration. "Ira Nelson Morris". Ship History Database Vessel Status Card. U.S. Department of Transportation, Maritime Administration. Archived from the original on 12 December 2019.
- Davies, James (May 2004). "Specifications (As-Built)" (PDF). p. 23.
- "SS Ira Nelson Morris".
