= University College Players =

Theatrical society of University College, Oxford

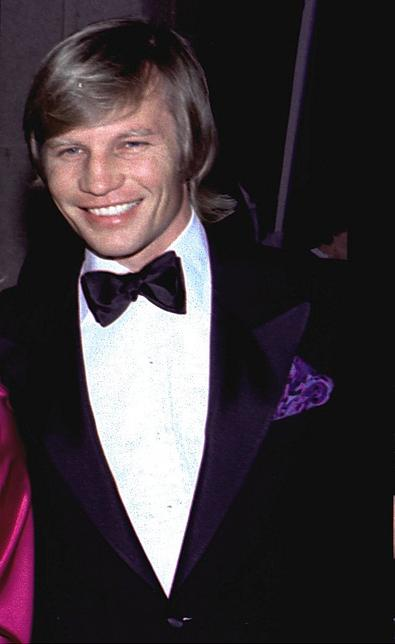
- The actor Michael York, a former member of Univ Players
- Abbreviation: Univ Players
- Named after: University College
- Formation: May 1941
- Founded at: University College, Oxford
- Type: Club
- Legal status: Current
- Purpose: Theatrical productions
- Headquarters: University College
- Location: Oxford, United Kingdom
- Region served: Oxford
- Services: Theatrical performances
- Official language: English
- President: Myfanwy Taylor-Bean
- Key people: Peter Bayley; John Albery; Leslie Mitchell
- Parent organization: University College, Oxford

The University College Players (or Univ Players for short) are the theatrical society of University College, Oxford.

== History ==
The first production was in May 1941 when Shakespeare's The Comedy of Errors was performed in co-operation with Merton College. Peter Bayley was the senior member from the start till the 1960s. After the Second World War, Univ Players was re-founded with a production of Measure for Measure in 1946.

In 1952, a young Maggie Smith appeared in a production of He Who Gets Slapped by the Russian playwright Leonid Andreyev, directed by Peter Bayley at the Clarendon Press Institute, after attending a theatrical training scheme and performing in Twelfth Night at the Oxford Playhouse.

Michael York (then Michael Johnson) was a Univ Players member in the early 1960s, before graduating with a degree in English in 1964. Peter Sissons, later to become a newscaster, was Treasurer of the Univ Players during his time studying at University College in the 1960s. John Albery took over from Peter Bayley as the senior member of the Players during the 1960s, after his appointment as a chemistry don at University College. He organised the Univ Revue for many years. The March 1963 production of A Man for All Seasons at the Oxford Playhouse was especially successful.

In 1974, Jon Plowman directed a musical version of Zuleika Dobson at the Oxford Playhouse, with a script by Reggie Oliver and music by Michael Brand. In the late 1970s, the Univ Players produced successful outdoor summer productions of The Seagull (1976, in St Hilda's meadow), A Midsummer Night's Dream and an adaptation of Alice in Wonderland (1977 and 1978, in the grounds of Magdalen College School by Magdalen Bridge).

More recently they have had annual outdoor summer productions in the garden of the Master's Lodgings. Recent productions include Sheridan's The School for Scandal in 2003, Stoppard's The Real Inspector Hound in 2009, and Congreve's The Way of the World in 2010. In May 2011, Jack Peters directed Nikolai Gogol's The Government Inspector. In May 2013, Elisabeth Watts directed Oliver Goldsmith's She Stoops to Conquer.

== Univ Revue ==
John Albery organised the Univ Revue in the college Hall, starting in 1972, with Leslie Mitchell. It consisted of an irreverent series of sketches with some musical by both fellows and students of the college. Performers included John Albery, Leslie Mitchell, Jean Maud, Colin Moynihan, John Redcliffe-Maud and others. Having been absent for ten years, the Univ Revue returned in 2012.

== Alumni ==
Here is a selection of former members:

- John Albery
- Peter Bayley
- Jonathan Bowen
- Andrew Edis
- Colin Ford
- Gordon Honeycombe
- Braham Murray
- Reggie Oliver
- Jon Plowman
- Andrew Robinson
- William George Q
- Tony Sarchet
- Desmond Shawe-Taylor
- Peter Sissons
- Dame Maggie Smith
- Michael York

== See also ==
- Oxford University Dramatic Society
