= Tim Albery =

English stage director

- Born: 20 May 1952 (age 74)
- Parent: Donald Albery
- Relatives: Sir Bronson Albery (grandfather); Ian Albery (brother); Nicholas Albery (brother); Ivan Albery Powell (son)

Tim Bronson Reginald Albery (born 20 May 1952) is an English stage director, best known for his productions of opera.

== Life and career ==
Albery was born in Harpenden, the son of the impresario Donald Albery and grandson of the producer Sir Bronson Albery. Albery's brother was the social inventor Nicholas Albery. After directing drama in the British provinces, he directed his first operatic production, Britten's The Turn of the Screw for a music festival at Batignano, Italy in 1983. For Opera North, Albery directed operas by Tippett, Mozart and most notably Berlioz: his production of Les Troyens is described by The New Grove Dictionary of Opera as "triumphant".

For the English National Opera (ENO), Albery directed Berlioz’s Beatrice and Benedict (1990) and Britten’s Billy Budd (1988) and Peter Grimes (1991). Together with his fellow directors, Richard Jones, Jude Kelly, Phyllida Lloyd, Deborah Warner and Francesca Zambello, Albery publicly supported ENO's general director Nicholas Payne in his dispute with the ENO's chairman Martin Smith over avant-garde productions. They wrote, "The aim must be to create a new audience that does not see opera as a middle-class trophy art form: an audience that Payne was beginning to attract to the Coliseum."

For Scottish Opera, Albery directed Wagner's Ring cycle between 1999 and 2003, and Mozart's Don Giovanni in 2006.

In a partnership with Soundstreams and Luminato, Albery both Directed and Created Hell's Fury in 2019.

Grove's Dictionary describes Albery's style as "a modern visual and dramatic language that combined stillness, taut economy, intense feeling for states of psychological and poetic complexity, and deep musical responsiveness" creating "a powerful impression of musico-dramatic revelation."
