= Judith Ledeboer =

Dutch-born English architect

Judith Geertruid Ledeboer
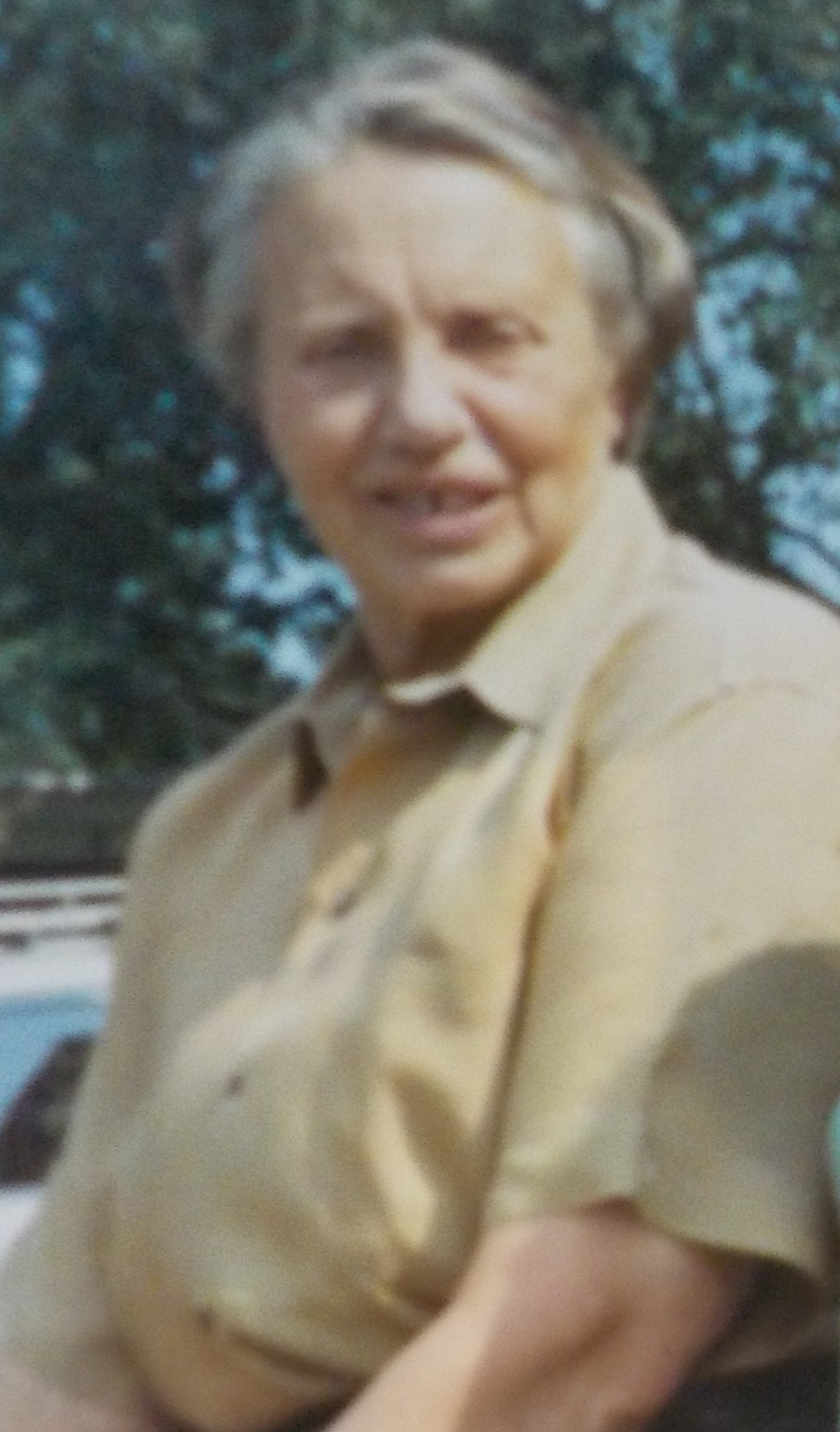
- Born: 8 September 1901; Almelo, Netherlands
- Died: 24 December 1990 (aged 89); Surrey, United Kingdom
- Known for: Architecture
- Awards: Officer of the Most Excellent Order of the British Empire (OBE) (1966)

Judith Geertruid Ledeboer OBE (8 September 1901 – 24 December 1990) was a Dutch-born English architect. She was most active in London and Oxford, where she designed a variety of schools, university buildings and public housing projects.

== Early life and education ==
Ledeboer was born in 1901 in Almelo, the Netherlands. She was one of six children born to Willem Ledeboer, who worked as a banker, and Harmina Engelbertha van Heek. Her family moved to London shortly after her birth. She attended Wimbledon High School, Cheltenham Ladies' College and Bedford College (a constituent school of the University of London). She studied history at Newnham College at the University of Cambridge from 1921 to 1924. She moved to Cambridge, Massachusetts, to complete a master's degree in economics at Radcliffe College in 1925, and returned to London the next year to train at the Architectural Association School of Architecture. She studied alongside Jessica Albery, Justin Blanco White, and Mary Crowley (later Medd), and they developed a commitment to housing reform and social concerns which impacted their future careers. She graduated in 1931.

With Jessica Albery, Ledeboer spent six months on building sites in the City of London, learning in a hands on way from contact with foremen, clerks of works, and the wider building trades.

== Career ==
One of Ledeboer's early inspirations was the architect Elisabeth Scott, whom she assisted on the Shakespeare Memorial Theatre (now the Royal Shakespeare Theatre) in Stratford-upon-Avon. Ledeboer went into practice with David Booth in 1939 as Booth and Ledeboer, where she mainly worked on small residential projects. She left the firm in 1941 to work for the Ministry of Health through World War II. She was the first female employee of the ministry to be responsible for housing, and was secretary of the Dudley and Burt committees on public housing.

In 1946, Ledeboer left the Ministry of Health and returned to practice with Booth. In 1956, John Pinckheard became a partner in the firm and it became Booth, Ledeboer, and Pinckheard. The firm was based in London and Oxford and its main clients were universities and in the public sector. Some of the university projects on which Ledeboer worked were the Institute of Archaeology and Classical Studies at the University of London (1953–1958), the Waynflete Building of Magdalen College at the University of Oxford (1961–1964), and Magdalen College School (1966), also part of Magdalen College. Booth and Ledeboer's work in the public sector included hospitals, factories, offices and a number of schools, including the Dragon School and Headington School, both in Oxford.

Ledeboer designed several housing complexes in London for the Lewisham and Newham Borough Councils. The project for which she is best known is the elderly home on the Lansbury Estate in Poplar, London, which she designed for the Festival of Britain in 1951. She designed a neighbourhood unit in Hemel Hempstead in 1950–1955, comprising houses, flats, maisonettes and shops.

Ledeboer left private practice in 1970 but remained an active member of the Royal Institute of British Architects and the Landscape Institute until the mid-1970s. She died in 1990 at her home in Hambledon, Surrey.

== Legacy ==
Ledeboer was described by Lynne Walker in the Oxford Dictionary of National Biography as "one of the most significant voices in post-war housing policy". She was appointed Officer of the Most Excellent Order of the British Empire (OBE) in 1966.
