= Wyndham Albery =

British politician and accountant

- Born: Wyndham James Albery; 1882; London, England
- Died: 28 August 1940 (aged 57–58)
- Education: Uppingham School
- Occupations: Politician and accountant
- Parent(s): Mary Moore and James Albery
- Relatives: Irving Albery (brother; Bronson Albery (brother); Jessica Mary Albery (niece)

Wyndham James Albery (1882 – 28 August 1940) was a British politician and accountant.

== Biography ==
Born in London, Albery was the third and youngest son of the actress and theatrical manager Mary Moore (later Lady Wyndham) and playwright James Albery. His eldest brother Irving went into politics and became a Conservative MP and his middle brother, Bronson, became a theatre manager.

Albery attended Uppingham School and became an accountant. He published some poems in 1906. He joined the Independent Labour Party (ILP), and from 1913 to 1919 served as secretary of its West London Federation, then as the federation's chair.

Albery was a conscientious objector during World War I, and was imprisoned in 1917, but soon released. Through the ILP, he became active in the Labour Party, serving on Marylebone Council from 1919. At the 1922 and 1923 UK general elections, he stood unsuccessfully in Hammersmith South. In 1923, he became treasurer of the London Divisional Council of the ILP, and from 1924 he was chair of the party's North West London Federation. By 1930, he represented the ILP the executive of the London Labour Party, on which he argued against work tests for recipients of outdoor relief. At the 1931 London County Council election, he stood unsuccessfully in Hammersmith South.

His niece through Irving was Jessica Albery, an architect and town planner, one of the first professional women architects in the UK in the early 20th century.
