= Donald Albery =

English theatre impresario

Sir Donald Albery
- Albery in December 1972.
- Born: Donald Arthur Rolleston Albery; 19 June 1914; St Pancras, London, England
- Died: 14 September 1988 (aged 74); Monte Carlo, Monaco
- Occupation: Theatre impresario
- Spouses: Rubina Macgilchrist (m. 1934; div. 1946); Cicely Boys (m. 1946; div. 1974); Nobuko Uenishi Morris (m. 1974)
- Children: 4, including Ian, Nicholas and Tim
- Father: Sir Bronson Albery

Sir Donald Arthur Rolleston Albery (19 June 1914 – 14 September 1988) was an English theatre impresario who did much to translate the adventurous spirit of London in the 1960s onto the stage.

== Biography ==
Donald Albery was born into a theatrical family, with his father being the director Sir Bronson James Albery, and his grandmother the actress and theatrical manager Mary Charlotte Moore, who was married to actor-manager Charles Wndham. Donald was educated at Alpine College, Switzerland.

His first job was to manage Sadler's Wells Ballet during the Blitz. When he launched his own Donmar company in 1953 he championed plays by Graham Greene, Tennessee Williams, Edward Albee, Jean Anouilh, and an adaptation by J. B. Priestley of an Iris Murdoch novel.

Though he was always commercially minded, his spirit of adventure endured with the first London production of Samuel Beckett's Waiting for Godot and sponsorship of Joan Littlewood's Theatre Workshop. In 1961, Albery, in collaboration with William Donaldson, produced Beyond the Fringe in London and, in 1962, in New York.

From 1964 to 1968, Albery served as director and administrator of the London Festival Ballet.

Albery was appointed Knight Bachelor in the 1977 New Year Honours for services to the theatre.

In 1982, Albery added his archive to the British theatre holdings of the Harry Ransom Center. Records include correspondence, legal and financial documents, scripts, sound recordings, prompt books, manuscript and printed music scores and parts, and printed and publicity materials such as clippings, programmes, playbills, posters, proofs and tickets concerning the theatrical productions and business affairs of Wyndham's Theatres Ltd., The Piccadilly Theatre Ltd., Sadler's Wells Theatre, the Royal Ballet, and the touring productions of the Festival Ballet.

== Family ==
Albery was married three times.

1. In 1934, he married Rubina Macgilchrist (injured in an air raid, and died 1956); they were divorced in 1946, having had a son, Ian Albery.
2. In 1946, he married Cicely Margaret Heather Boys, daughter of the army officer Reginald Harvey Henderson Boys; they were divorced in 1974, and had three children including Nicholas Albery and Tim Albery.
3. In 1974, he married Nobuko Uenishi Morris, former wife of author Ivan Morris.
