= Ivan Morris =

English writer and Japanese scholar (1925–1976)

- Born: Ivan Ira Esme Morris; 29 November 1925; Kensington, London, England
- Died: 19 July 1976 (aged 50); Bologna, Italy
- Education: Harvard University (BA); SOAS University of London (PhD)
- Occupations: Writer, translator, editor
- Spouse(s): Ayako Ogawa (divorced); Nobuko Uenishi (divorced)
- Parents: Ira Victor Morris (father); Edita Morris (mother)
- Relatives: Ira Nelson Morris (grandfather); Nelson Morris (great-grandfather); Victor Henry Rothschild (great-grandfather)

Ivan Ira Esme Morris (29 November 1925 – 19 July 1976) was an English writer, translator and editor in the field of Japanese studies.

== Biography ==
Ivan Morris was born in London, of mixed American and Swedish parentage to Edita Morris (née Toll) and Ira Victor Morris (son of diplomat Ira Nelson Morris and grandson of meat-packer Nelson Morris). He studied at Gordonstoun, before graduating from Phillips Academy. He graduated magna cum laude from Harvard University and received a doctorate at the SOAS University of London, specializing in Oriental languages. As an intelligence officer for the U.S. Navy, Morris was one of the first interpreters sent into Hiroshima after the dropping of the atomic bomb.

Morris wrote widely on modern and ancient Japan, and translated numerous classical and modern literary works. He personally knew writer Yukio Mishima and translated some of his writings. Morris's book The Nobility of Failure is dedicated to Mishima's memory. Morris's translation of The Pillow Book Sei Shonagon is probably his most significant translation from Classical Japanese, and his The World of the Shining Prince, a description of the Heian court culture at the time of The Tale of Genji, is probably his most important single scholarly work.

Morris joined the faculty of Columbia University in 1960 and was Chairman of the Department of East Asian Languages and Cultures from 1966 to 1969. In 1966 he was elected a Fellow of St Antony's College, Oxford. He helped to found Amnesty International USA and was the first chair of its board of directors, from 1973 to 1976.

Ivan Morris died of heart failure in Bologna, Italy, on 19 July 1976.

== Personal life ==
Morris was married three times. His second wife was Japanese ballet dancer Ayako Ogawa, his third wife Japanese writer Nobuko Uenishi.

== Selected works ==
=== As writer ===
- Nationalism and the Right Wing in Japan: A Study of Postwar Trends, Oxford University Press, 1960
- The World of the Shining Prince: Court Life in Ancient Japan, Alfred A. Knopf, 1964
- Dictionary of Selected Forms in Classical Japanese Literature, Columbia University Press, 1966
- The Tale of Genji Scroll, Kodansha, 1971
- The Nobility of Failure: Tragic Heroes in the History of Japan, Holt, Rinehart and Winston, 1975

=== As translator ===
- The Crazy Iris by Masuji Ibuse, Encounter, Vol. 6 no. 5, 1956
- As I Crossed a Bridge of Dreams (translation of Sarashina Nikki), The Dial Press, 1971
- The Pillow Book of Sei Shōnagon, Oxford University Press, 1967
- The Journey by Jirō Osaragi, Charles E. Tuttle, 1967
- The Life of an Amorous Woman by Ihara Saikaku, Unesco/New Directions Books, 1963
- The Temple of the Golden Pavilion by Yukio Mishima, Alfred A. Knopf, 1959
- Fires on the Plain by Shōhei Ōoka, Martin Secker & Warburg, 1957
- "The Priest of Shiga Temple and His Love" by Yukio Mishima, in Death in Midsummer and Other Stories, New Directions Publishing Corporation, 1966
- "Swaddling Clothes" by Yukio Mishima, in Death in Midsummer and Other Stories, New Directions Publishing Corporation, 1966

=== As editor ===
- Modern Japanese Stories, Charles E. Tuttle, 1962
- Thought and Behaviour in Modern Japanese Politics, by Masao Maruyama, Oxford University Press, 1963
- Japan, 1931–45: Militarism, Fascism, Japanism?, Heath, 1963
- The Pillow-Book Puzzles, Bodley Head, 1969
- Madly Singing in the Mountains: An Appreciation and Anthology of Arthur Waley, Walker, 1970
