= BIT (alternative information centre) =

Information service, publisher, travel guide and social centre

BIT was an information service, publisher, travel guide and social centre founded in 1968 by John "Hoppy" Hopkins. It pre-dated the Internet as a free service that would try to find any information asked for, but post-dated library reference desks, and derived its name from the smallest unit of computer information.

== BIT ==
BIT was initially a partial spin-off from Hoppy's earlier International Times information service, which was being overwhelmed by the number of enquiries it was receiving, then subsequently took on a life of its own, becoming a much wider organisation more akin to the later social centres. Emerging from the UK underground as a volunteer-run business, it evolved into a collective and open house based in Notting Hill above the Badge Boutique.

Although often undefinable, one staff member tried with "We're open every day of the year from 10am to 10pm (telephone 24 hours) and we give free help and information about anything to anyone who wants it. Dirty, untidy office; friendly, sometimes exuberant atmosphere, inefficient staff, confused clientele, aggressive cat. Free information, free bogs, free bath. free duplicator and typewriter, free kittens and puppies, free clothes, free food — cheap at other times but free if you're really starving, free people to talk to, free alternative library, free day-room to freak out in or sleep in, free crashpad, lots of other free floor space depending on the season, free optimism, free ecstasy, free lots of other things plus expensive travel guides to pay for it all."

In the beginning of the 1970s, Nicholas Albery, just back from a stay in Haight-Ashbury, started getting involved with this newly set "Information Service", and quickly became a driving force in the development of wider activities for BIT, so that it became one of the first Social centres in London Area. Around 1972–73, at the peak of its activities and with the momentum given by Nicholas, BIT Info-Service ran 24 hours on 24, with "BIT-workers" coming up at around 10 PM to take their night shift, receiving and helping incomers from all over the world, until around 8:00 AM, when the "day-team" showed up.

== BIT Guide ==
The BIT Guide, an early duplicated stapled-together "foolscap bundle" with a pink cover and with the title Overland to India and Australia, provided information for those travelling across Asia for the first time. Updated by those already on the road, it warned of pitfalls and suggested places to see and stay. The first BIT Guide was produced by the BIT Information & Help Service in London in 1970. The fourth edition (1975) was published by the Crisis-BIT Trust. The BIT guide reached its peak under the guidance of founding editor Geoff Crowther, who arrived at BIT in 1972 and later became a prolific travel writer for Lonely Planet and was instrumental to the company's rise during the early days.

== Community Levy for Alternative Projects ==
In 1974 BIT became the coordinating centre for Community Levy for Alternative Projects, an invitation to supply funds for, generally, fledgling alternative projects, partly targeting shops and businesses that identified with counter-cultural ideas and aspirations.

== Free festivals ==
BIT also ran early festival services, providing help and information for festival patrons, which were rarely supplied by the organisers of big corporate events, such as the Isle of Wight Festival, and were often an integral part of the organisation of free festivals such as Windsor Free Festival. Alongside Release, Festival Welfare Services and more occasionally IT, Oz and the White Panthers they provided a countercultural safety-net, providing an understanding environment sometimes characterised as a 'bad trips' tent.

The 7-7-77 Glastonbury Free Festival was organised by BIT, including activist Alan Strom.

== Literature ==
- Beam, Alan; Morrison, Pete (1976). Rehearsal for the Year 2000: (drugs, Religions, Madness, Crime, Communes, Love, Visions, Festivals and Lunar Energy) : the Rebirth of Albion Free State (known in the Dark Ages as England) : Memoirs of a Male Midwife (1966-1976). London: Revelaction Press. ISBN 978-0-9505244-0-5.

an account of the early years of BIT, by Nicholas Albery, with most names changed to protect the innocent.
