= Eva Moberg (writer) =

- Born: 14 February 1932; Stockholm, Sweden
- Died: 22 May 2011 (aged 79); Stockholm, Sweden
- Occupations: Author, playwright
- Relatives: Vilhelm Moberg
- Writing career
- Language: Swedish
- Literary movement: Swedish feminism

Eva Moberg (1932–2011) was a Swedish author, playwright, and debater.

== Biography ==
Eva Moberg was the daughter of author Vilhelm Moberg and grew up in Stockholm. She graduated from secondary school in 1952, and in 1963 she became a licentiate of literary history, religious history, and practical philosophy with her thesis Kärlek och kön, en studie i Colettes diktning (English: Love and gender, a study of the poetry of Colette). She was editor of the Fredrika Bremer Association's periodical Hertha (1960–1962), culture editor in the weekly magazine Vi (1967–1976) and a columnist for Dagens Nyheter (1976–1992). She wrote about social issues, politics, and ethical questions. From 1968 to 1970 she held a position as a script writer for Sveriges Television, Sweden's national television network. There, she wrote a series of notable TV variety shows, and later several sitcoms.

Moberg was an early participant in the gender equality debate in Sweden. In 1961 she published the article "Kvinnans villkorliga frigivning" (Woman's Conditional Release), which is considered a Swedish feminist classic. (See a link to it under "External links" below.) In that article she argued that equality between men and women was still far off, as women were still expected to see marrying and having children as their purpose in life. Her essay started an intense and long-lived debate on men's and women's roles in the family and the society at large. By the middle of the 1960s she became a member of Group 222, a loosely organized activist group for gender equality. Group 222's and Moberg's ideas of an equitable society criticized the traditional man's role; they claimed to seek not only women's but also men's emancipation. "Men are better than the patriarchy" was one of Moberg's important ideas – it also became the title of a lecture she later held abroad in the 1990s.

In the 1970s, Moberg also became involved in campaigns against nuclear power and later in questions of pollution and as a champion of animal rights.

From 1964 to 1976, Moberg was married to TV producer Hans Hederberg, with whom she had a daughter in 1966. Moberg later lived, until her death, with author Gottfried Grafström.

== Selected list of works ==
- "Kvinnans villkorliga frigivning" ("Woman's Release on Probation"), in the anthology Unga Liberaler: nio inlägg i idédebatten (Young liberals: nine contributions to the idea debate), Stockholm: Bonnier, 1961.
- Kvinnor och människor (Women and people), Stockholm: Bonnier, 1962. Tribunserien, 99-0152130-0
- Pengar eller livet?: exemplet kärnkraften (Money or life? The example of nuclear power), Stockholm: Bonnier, 1979. ISBN 91-0-043939-8
- Vad tar vi oss för?: tankar samlade i en sanslös tid (What are we doing?: thoughts collected in a senseless time), Stockholm: Timo, 1979. ISBN 91-7756-034-5
- Är krig naturligt? (Is war natural?), Stockholm: Fredsårsdelegationen, skriftserie, 0283-6912; 1, 1986
- Evas lilla gula: artiklar för återbruk (Eva's little yellow thing: articles for reuse), Stockholm: Dagens Nyheter, 1988. ISBN 91-7588-978-1
- Prima materia: texter i urval (Prima materia: selected texts), including among others Kvinnans villkorliga frigivning (Women's conditional release). Stockholm: Ordfront 2003. ISBN 91-7324-778-2

=== Children's books ===
- Barnen Bolinder (The Bolinder Children), 1973
- Martina drömmer (Martina dreams), 1985
- Urban, Raider och Martina (Urban, Raider and Martina), 1986
- Fabian och färgerna (Fabian and the colours), 1991

== Theater ==
- Prylar, 1987
- Svindlande skönhet, 1990
- Hög svansföring, 1994
- Himladjuren, 1996
- Eroterapi, 2001

== TV-productions ==
- Provokationer, 1967
- Grov kränkning, 1968
- Konfrontation, 1969
- Dom kallas människor, 1970
- Horoskopet, 1971
- Televisioner I-IV, 1973–1974
- Sagan om tåget, 1978
- Tillfälligt avbrott, 1978–79 (co-author)
- Skapelsens krona, 1980 (with Gottfried Grafström)
- Liten tuva, 1985 (with Gottfried Grafström)
- Dokument bakifrån, I – III 1986
- Jesu syster, 1987

== Radio productions ==
- Fritagningen, 1981
- Avskedsmiddag, 1984
