= Nobuko Albery =

Japanese writer and theatrical producer (born 1940)

- アルベリー信子
- Born: Uenishi Nobuko; 1940 (age 85–86); Ashiya, Hyōgo, Empire of Japan
- Citizenship: British
- Education: New York University (MA)
- Occupations: Theatrical producer; novelist; memoirist; translator; activist
- Spouses: Ivan Morris (m. 1967; div. 1973); Sir Donald Albery (m. 1974; died 1988)

Nobuko, Lady Albery (Japanese: アルベリー信子; née Uenishi, later Uenishi Morris; born 1940) is a Japanese writer, translator and theatrical producer based in Monte Carlo, Monaco. While working for Tōhō, she was instrumental in bringing British and American musical theatre to Japan. She is the author of three novels, a work of memoir and the co-author of a work on Japanese medieval history. She is also notable as the founder of the Japan Amarant Society and as the widow of the English theatrical impresario, Sir Donald Albery.

== Early life and education ==
Lady Albery (Note: Lady Albery's first husband was the English writer and orientalist Ivan Morris; and, during their marriage, she published under Nobuko Morris—her legal name at the time. She later married Donald Albery; and, once he was created a knight bachelor in 1977, became styled Nobuko, Lady Albery thereafter, though she publishes under the name Nobuko Albery.) was born Uenishi Nobuko in Ashiya, Hyōgo Prefecture, Japan, the daughter of the president of an engineering company, Keiji Uenishi, and his wife, Sodako, a haiku poet. She is the eldest of four sisters.

During the Second World War, Uenishi was evacuated and educated at Kobe College Junior and Senior High School, a girls' school founded by American missionaries. In 1960, she enrolled at the prestigious Waseda University in Tokyo, belonging to the Dramatic Arts Department, and was an active Zengakuren member. On 15 June, she was involved in a demonstration as part of the Anpo protests in the courtyard of the Diet Building in Tokyo, which was violently suppressed by armed police, leading to the death of Michiko Kanba, a female student. Uenishi's parents initially feared reports of the deceased girl were describing their daughter, as Kanba was not immediately identified; and, upon being reunited in Tokyo, Uenishi was quickly transferred to New York University (NYU) by her father, furious at her for becoming engaged with an anti-American political movement. While in the United States, she occupied a room on the seventh floor of Judson Memorial Church's tower in Manhattan. She graduated from the Theatre Arts Department with a Master's degree in 1963.

== Career ==
=== 1963–1974: Tōhō ===
In order to avoid an arranged marriage, Uenishi acquired a letter of recommendation from her uncle to the influential playwright Kazuo Kikuta. Kikuta was the head of theatre production at the Japanese entertainment corporation Tōhō who, in 1963, had obtained the Japanese-language rights to the musical My Fair Lady. The production was the first of its kind yet proved highly popular with Japanese audiences, leading Tōhō to agree with Kikuta's suggestion that he have a Broadway representative. Kikuta hired Uenishi for this task and in this capacity she quickly acquired the Japanese rights to the musicals Kiss me, Kate, Hello, Dolly!, South Pacific, The King and I and Oklahoma!, amongst others. Her first major success came in 1964 when she acquired the musical Fiddler on the Roof for Tōhō. She later equated her success at this time to her apparent youth, claiming she looked like 'a 16-year-old babe' and to the fact that lawyers and agents pitied the post-war Japanese.

In 1967, she met the professor and chairman of oriental studies at Columbia University, Ivan Morris, at a party given for the Japanophiles and art collectors Jackson and Mary Burke. Uenishi married Morris three months later after receiving news of her younger sister Yasuko's engagement and fearing the prospect of remaining unmarried. During their marriage, the two resided in apartments on Riverside Drive, Manhattan, and Hyde Park Gate, London. They also participated in demonstrations against the Vietnam War organised by Morris's father, Ira Victor Morris, a scion of the Rothschild family and a communist.

Now Nobuko Uenishi Morris, her next major acquisition for Tōhō came when she obtained the rights to Margaret Mitchell's 1939 novel Gone with the Wind, adapting it for the Japanese stage. The result was another incredibly successful show: opening in 1966, the production was split into two parts which ran first consecutively and then back-to-back, becoming the longest running performance in Japanese history. The production was regularly revived until at least 1994. It was reported in The Times that one such run of the play by the all-female theatre troupe Takarazuka Revue featured an androgynous Rhett who drew 'ecstatic female crowds'. Tōhō also commissioned Kikuta to write a Japanese-language musical version, entitled Scarlett, which opened in 1970.

On the success of this venture, Mitchell's agent, Kay B. Barrett, offered to train her as her successor. Uenishi Morris, however was suffering from an unknown illness at the time, becoming increasingly unwell. Her doctor, recommended by Katharine Hepburn, diagnosed her with hyperthyroidism and suggested she separate from her husband. Following this advice, she returned to her parents in Aishiya and was hospitalised there for a month. Although he initially opposed her divorcing, her father later strictly forbade her from returning to her husband following an incident wherein he sent her an overcoat via a cash-on-delivery service, embarrassing her father who was forced to borrow money from his chauffeur to make the collection. Uenishi Morris returned to New York the following spring, renting an apartment on Central Park West and resuming her work for Tōhō.

In 1968, she met her second husband, Donald Albery, whom she would not marry until 1974, attempting to stage Oliver! for Tokyo's Imperial Theatre. Kikuta had a well-known love of Charles Dickens and ambitions of becoming a 'Japanese Dickens'. Uenishi Morris was therefore dispatched by Kikuta to persuade Albery to sign over Oliver!'s Japanese rights to Tōhō. Despite his incredulity that she was indeed Tōhō's agent and in fact an adult, he agreed to meet with her and Kikuta in Venice, where he was staging Swan Lake. She and Kikuta then flew to Tel Aviv to acquire Oliver!'s sets, also meeting with Marlene Dietrich who was starring in a one-woman show at the time. Oliver! opened the same year in Japan, with the guest of honour being Prince Hiro (later Emperor Naruhito). Photographs of the Prince with the lead actors appeared in the press the following day, helping to propel Oliver! to the status of a national sensation. The production was hugely successful, running at a profit for 11 weeks, cementing her friendship with her future husband.

In 1970, H. Paul Varley published his illustrated book Samurai, contributed to in part by she and Morris. The book was intended for a general audience rather than a specialist and was part of the Pageant of History series, edited by John Gross. The same year, Albery worked as an associate producer on the play Conduct Unbecoming (1970–71), produced by Donald Albery and set in the 19th-century British Raj.

In 1973, Nobuko Uenishi Morris was sued her husband for desertion and the two were divorced; Kikuta also died of a stroke, though she remained Tōhō's representative. The following year, Donald Albery divorced his wife, the theatrical director Cicely Boys, marrying her, and she assumed Albery's surname.

=== 1978–1987: As a novelist ===
In 1978, Nobuko Albery published her first novel, the semi-autobiographical Balloon Top. The narrative follows Kana, portraying her coming-of-age in postwar Japan. Kana's family, like the Uenishis, support Westernisation, while Kana, like Albery herself, becomes drawn into the student activism of the 1960s.

In 1964, Albery worked as an interpreter for the Nō players Sadayo Kita and Akiyo Tomoeda as they trained American actors to perform Ikkaku Sennin as part of a cultural exchange with Japan organised by the State Department. Based on this experience, Albery began to research over many years Zeami Motokiyo, an aesthetician and influential figure in Japanese theatre. Albery adapted this research into her second novel, The House of Kanzē, published over 20 years later, in 1984. The narrative follows Zeami and the Kanzē family, a troupe of Nō players. The novel was published in the United Kingdom and the United States, later being translated into German and, on the recommendation of Marguerite Yourcena, into French as Le démon du nô by Gallimard. It received favourable reviews from Iris Murdoch and Graham Greene, who recommended it as one of the two best books he had ever read in The Observer.

Albery's third novel Absurd Courage (1987) centres on Asako, a 22-year-old Japanese woman who marries an English art critic and becomes immersed in the Euro-American cultural elite.

=== 1987–2002: Japan Amarant Society ===
In 1987, Albery obtained the Japanese rights to the musical Les Misérables, producing it for the Imperial Theatre. The following year however, after thirteen years of marriage, Sir Donald died of cancer. Soon after, Albery began to experience amnesia, migraines, heart palpitations, diminished coordination and rashes. At a luncheon given by Prince Rainier III of Monaco, Albery experienced a hot flush which caused her to sweat profusely, much to her distress. Initially attributing her symptoms to grief, it was later suggested to Albery that she was suffering from the menopause, a taboo subject for the Japanese of that time and one on which the public was largely uninformed. In 1989, a French gynaecologist recommended she begin hormone replacement therapy (HRT) to treat these symptoms, to which Albery agreed, noticing a significant increase in her quality of life. During this time, she read an article in The Sunday Times publicising the Amarant Trust, an HRT-advocacy organisation established by the English MP Teresa Gorman.

Albery returned to Japan to revive Oliver! in memory of her late husband. Tōhō suggested that this time it be performed in Japanese and Albery translated the musical herself, doing the same for Miss Saigon the same year. At this time she also began work on a play based on the trials of Oscar Wilde, also in Japanese, titled Oscar, first performed in 1994. After several unsuccessful attempts to persuade middle-aged Japanese friends to pursue HRT, Albery resolved to spend the proceeds of her recent translations on the founding of a Japanese society modelled on Gorman's Amarant Trust. Invited by her friend, the English diplomat Sir Hugh Cortazzi, to serve on the programme committee of a festival celebrating the centenary of The Japan Society in London, she met with Gorman at the Palace of Westminster who gave Albery her blessing to found Japan Amarant Society.

Albery wrote of her experiences with the menopause and HRT in the women's magazine Fujin Kōron, her school friend being the publication's assistant editor. The article was released in September 1990, and the magazine's offices were subsequently overwhelmed with telephone inquiries as readers sought further information regarding the menopause and HRT. Albery also discussed the issue with Akio Morita, the founder of Sony, with whom she had come to be a close friend and confidant during her early career, when she would be expected to secure tickets for him and his wife to sold out Broadway shows. Through Morita, Albery gained an introduction to the Minister of Health, Labour and Welfare. For reasons that remain unclear to Albery, the Japan Amarant Society also came to be advised and represented by Tōhō's lawyer. She also enlisted her family to aid in the administration of the Society: from Monte Carlo, Albery wrote and illustrated the Amarant Newsletter, which was printed in Tokyo; her family managed membership fees, distribution and outreach from their home in Aishiya.

Albery engaged journalists at the Grand Prince Hotel Akasaka and International House of Japan in Roppongi but found little success in publicising her Society through the Japanese press. The English-language newspaper The Japan Times published an article entitled 'Braving the Last Taboo', however the publication's readership were not Albery's target demographic.

Albery directed the Society to establish the Menopōzu Workshops, rendering menopause in katakana as Menopōzu, on the advice of Morita, to attract international sponsorship and avoid the stigma around its equivalent Japanese term. Albery found such sponsorship in Mochida Pharmaceutical, a company which had been researching HRT since the Meiji era. The Mochida company offered the Society free use of Luke Hall, a 170-seat lecture theatre and the aid of its staff. Albery also enlisted her friend, the actress Ineko Arima, to voice a Japanese version of the English Amarant Trust's informational video, though she was unable to follow through on this commitment due to her production schedule.

However, after 13 years of operation, Albery felt that Japanese women remained unwilling or unable to take responsibility for their own menopausal health and she dissolved the Society around 2002.

== Personal life ==
The Alberys chiefly resided in Monte Carlo, Monaco, but maintained a country house in the commune of Roquefort-les-Pains in Provence-Alpes-Côte d'Azur, France. Lady Albery sold the latter property in 1995. During her marriage to Ivan Morris, she and her first husband's country house was in the commune of Nesles in Hauts-de-France, France.

Albery is an accomplished linguist, speaking English, French, German, Turkish and Italian in addition to her native Japanese and is reported to speak English with a colloquial mid-Atlantic accent, calling Marlene Dietrich a 'blonde broad' in one interview. She also plays the piano.

Albery is also a patron of the all-female theatre troupe Takarazuka Revue, introducing them to the West End in 1994. She is also an honorary advisor to the Jean M. Wong School of Ballet.

=== Friendships with other writers ===
Albery was a friend of the Japanese writer Yukio Mishima, discussing him as a speaker in Michael McIntyre's documentary for the BBC television series Arena, The Strange Case of Yukio Mishima (1985). She was introduced to Mishima and his wife, Yōko, through her first husband between 1969–70. They often met, along with lieutenants of the Tatenokai, at the Imperial Hotel in Tokyo. When in 1970 Mishima failed to incite the garrison at Camp Ichigaya to stage a coup d'état—resulting in his committing seppuku—Morris and his colleague Donald Keene received letters posted before Mishima's death asking that they translate his tetralogy of novels The Sea of Fertility into English. To Albery's disappointment, they refused his request, despite Morris and Mishima having also discussed the matter in person, shortly before the latter's death, with Morris at the time seeming to acquiesce.

Albery met with many influential Japanese creatives in New York in the early 1960s; among them were Mishima; the Nobel Prize winning novelist Kenzaburō Ōe, whom she recalls meeting at the Waldorf Astoria hotel; the novelist and politician Shintaro Ishihara; the impresario Keita Asari and the conductor Seiji Ozawa. Through Morris, she also knew the academics and writers Edward Seidensticker, Ronald P. Dore, Norman Mailer, Frank Conroy, Anthony West, Brendan Gil and V. S. Naipaul. She was also a friend of the artist Ronald Searle, whom she helped with his Japanese during the production of his book To the Kwai and Back: War Drawings 1939–1945 (1986).

Albery was also a close friend of the writer Anaïs Nin, first appearing in the Diary in the winter of 1962–63, and was the basis for Nin's character Nobuko in her final novel, Collages (1964). Albery first met one of Nin's husbands, Ian Hugo, and knew her by reputation through the artist Isamu Noguchi, a former lover of Nin's whom Albery often met at Gen'ichirō Inokuma's apartment as part of a salon for Japanese creatives in New York. On her and Nin's first meeting, she and Hugo took Albery to see René Clément's film Forbidden Games (1952) and later to a French restaurant for supper. Albery was then responsible for introducing Nin's work to Japan when she gave Nin's novel A Spy in the House of Love (1954) to her friend Tomohisa Kawade—whose father Takao was president of the publishing house Kawade Shobō Shinsha. The company swiftly translated and published Nin's book.

== Bibliography ==
Books
Year	Title	Publisher	ISBN	Pages	Note
1970	Samurai	Weidenfeld & Nicolson	9780140217940	135	As Nobuko Morris, co-authored with Ivan Morris and H. Paul Varley. Non-fiction. Reprinted by Penguin Books.
1978	Balloon Top	Pantheon Books	9780712608459	256	Novel, autofiction.
1984	The House of Kanzē	Simon & Schuster	9780722110676	320	Novel, based on the life of Zeami Motokiyo.
1987	Absurd Couragre	Century	9780712611497	254	Novel.
2002	Japanese Pride and Prejudice	Gobal Oriental	9781901903409	180	Memoir.

=== Plays ===
- Oscar (Tokyo, 1994).
