= Irving Albery =

British politician (1879–1967)

Sir Irving Albery

Member of Parliament for Gravesend
- In office 29 October 1924 – 15 June 1945
- Preceded by: George Isaacs
- Succeeded by: Garry Allighan

Personal details
- Born: Irving James Albery; 12 May 1879
- Died: 14 November 1967 (aged 88)
- Party: Conservative
- Spouse: Gertrude Mary Jones
- Children: 3, including Jessica Albery
- Parent(s): Mary Moore and James Albery
- Relatives: Bronson Albery (brother); Wyndham Albery (brother

Sir Irving James Albery (12 May 1879 – 14 November 1967) was a Conservative Party politician in the United Kingdom who served as member of parliament (MP) for Gravesend from 1924 to 1945.

== Biography ==
The eldest of three sons of actress and theatrical manager Mary Moore (later Lady Wyndham) and actor James Albery Albery first stood for Parliament at the 1923 general election, when he unsuccessfully contested the Labour Party safe seat of Bow and Bromley in the East End of London. His youngest brother Wyndham went into politics and middle brother, Bronson, became a theatre manager.

At the 1929 general election, he was elected as MP for the Gravesend constituency in Kent, defeating the Labour MP George Isaacs, who had won the seat in 1923 with a majority only 119 votes.

Albery held the Gravesend seat for 21 years, until his own defeat at the 1945 general election by the Labour candidate Garry Allighan. Allighan was expelled from the House of Commons two years later, but Albery (by then 68 years old) did not contest the resulting by-election in November 1947, when Labour's Richard Acland held the seat with a reduced majority.

He was knighted in the King's Birthday Honours, 1936, for "political and public services".

He married Gertrude Mary Jones (1884–1967) and they had three children. Their eldest child and only daughter Jessica Albery was an architect and town planner, one of the first professional women architects in the UK in the early 20th century.

Parliament of the United Kingdom
| Preceded by George Isaacs | Member of Parliament for Gravesend; 1924–1945 | Succeeded by Garry Allighan |
