= Leslie Mitchell (historian) =

Historian of the 18th century

Dr Leslie G. Mitchell MA, DPhil, FRHistS is an academic historian specialising in British history.

Mitchell is currently an Emeritus Fellow of University College and a member of the History Faculty at the University of Oxford, England. He has been Dean of the college, appeared in the Univ Revue, recruited students for work in the intelligence services and was editor of the University College Record, an annual publication for former members of the college. Mitchell is counted among a talented generation of post-war historians, including Maurice Keen, Alexander Murray and Henry Mayr-Harting.

== Books ==
- Mitchell, Leslie (1992). Charles James Fox. Oxford: Oxford University Press. ISBN 0-19-820104-4.
- Mitchell, Leslie (1997). Lord Melbourne: 1779–1848. Oxford: Oxford University Press. ISBN 0-19-820592-9.
- Mitchell, Leslie (2003). Bulwer Lytton: The Rise and Fall of a Victorian Man of Letters. London: Hambledon and London. ISBN 1-85285-423-5.
- Mitchell, Leslie (2005). The Whig World. London: Hambledon Continuum. ISBN 1-85285-456-1.
- Mitchell, Leslie (2009). Maurice Bowra: A Life. Oxford: Oxford University Press. ISBN 978-0199295845.

Reception to Bulwer Lytton: The Rise and Fall of a Victorian Man of Letters

"Leslie Mitchell has organised his book along thematic lines. This allows him to sidestep the deadening effects of a linear narrative and to bury in the background the kind of relentless detail that can make reading biography such a slog. It also means that Lytton springs to life from the very first chapters, which concentrate on the relationships with his ghastly mother and peculiar wife. The downside is, inevitably, a certain loss of coherence. This, though, is a small price to pay. Mitchell has a kind eye for this curious man, who now, on the second centenary of his birth, needs not simply an introduction, but a whole book to explain who he once was."

Reception to The Whig World

"In 10 wonderful chapters, as fluid and generous as anything that Macaulay or Trevelyan ever wrote, Mitchell sets about describing a tone, a temper and a style that was emphatically Whig. He takes us from those great "power statements in stone" of Chatsworth or Woburn Abbey to the buffing and polishing that went on during the grand tour, only reluctantly and temporarily abandoned thanks to a little unpleasantness in Paris; we visit languorous Lord Melbourne, Queen Victoria's earliest crush, who believed that parliamentary reform was probably inevitable, although he couldn't be bothered to read the detailed clauses of various bills. The result is an elegant exposition of a way of being that informed, without directing, let alone controlling, some of the most important social and political developments of the second half of the Georgian period."
