= Ian Albery =

English theatre consultant

Ian Bronson Albery (born 21 September 1936) is an English theatre consultant, manager, and producer. He is a former chief executive of Sadler's Wells Theatre (1994-2002), and was in charge of the Donmar Warehouse from 1961 to 1989.

He is the son of Sir Donald Albery, a prolific theatre manager. From 1958 to 1972, Ian Albery served as stage manager, production manager, or technical director for more than 100 West End theatre productions, including:

- West Side Story
- Irma La Douce
- The World of Suzie Wong
- Oliver!
- The Miracle Worker
- Sparrers Can't Sing
- Beyond the Fringe
- La Bonne Soupe
- Blitz!
- Fiorello!
- A Severed Head
- The Poker Session
- Who's Afraid of Virginia Woolf?
- Instant Marriage
- Portrait of a Queen
- Jorrocks
- The Prime of Miss Jean Brodie
- The Italian Girl
- Hadrian VII
- Man of La Mancha
- Anne of Green Gables
- Conduct Unbecoming
- The Mandrake
- Poor Horace
- Popkiss

Albery has served as managing director at the Piccadilly Theatre, the vice-chairman of the Association of British Theatre Technicians, and as an executive member of the Society of West End Theatre.

== Personal life ==
Albery married actress Barbara Yu Ling Lee (died 1997) in 1966. They had two sons before the marriage ended in divorce. He has a daughter from a later relationship with costume designer Jenny Beavan. In 2003 he married Judy Monahan.
