= Mary Moore (stage actress) =

English actress and theatrical manager (1861–1931)

Moore in 1886

Mary Charlotte Moore (3 July 1861 – 6 April 1931), Lady Wyndham, was an English actress and theatrical manager. She was known for her appearances in comedies alongside the actor-manager Charles Wyndham between 1885 and his retirement in 1913. Over these three decades they acted mainly in contemporary plays, many written for them by authors including Henry Arthur Jones and Hubert Henry Davies, but also appeared in classic comedies together. She continued to act on stage until 1919. She was married to the playwright James Albery from 1879 to 1889, and after his death her relationship with Wyndham eventually became romantic. After the death of Wyndham's estranged wife in 1916, he and Moore married.

A capable businesswoman, Moore became Wyndham's business partner and was joint proprietor of Wyndham's Theatre and the New Theatre (now the Noël Coward Theatre) built for him in 1899 and 1903. After Wyndham's death she founded a company through which she controlled the two theatres until she died in 1931, aged 69. She also was president of the Actors' Benevolent Fund.

== Life and career ==
=== Early years ===
Mary Moore was born in London on 3 July 1861, the daughter of a Parliamentary agent, Charles Moore; she was educated at Warwick Hall, Maida Vale. She learnt the power of money when her education was paused for lack of money and she had to work aged twelve collecting rents from the poor in Hoxton. She made her stage debut at the Gaiety Theatre, London, under the management of John Hollingshead, but soon retired into private life on her marriage in 1878 to the playwright James Albery. They had three sons, born between 1879 and 1882: the eldest and youngest, Irving and Wyndham, went into politics; the middle son, Bronson, became a theatre manager.

In the mid 1880s, Albery, weakened by illness and drink, became unable to write and support his family. The actor-manager Charles Wyndham, a good friend of the Alberys, offered Moore a place in his theatrical companies. He was starring at the Criterion Theatre, London, in The Candidate, which, like many of his productions, was a judiciously Anglicised adaptation of a French farce. (Note: In this case Le Député de Bombignac by Alexandre Bisson. The translator, who attempted, without success, to remain anonymous was a Member of Parliament, Justin Huntly McCarthy.) Moore returned to the stage in March 1885 in Wyndham's provincial touring company of The Candidate in the role of Lady Dorothy Osterley, before joining the main company in London in October to take over the role of Lady Oldacre in the same play. She remained with Wyndham professionally, and later also personally, for the rest of his life.

=== Leading lady ===
The Times obituarist of Moore commented, "The year 1886 was that in which she began to emerge from the crowd", playing the heroine, Ada Ingot, in David Garrick. Wyndham starred in the title role and frequently revived the piece with Moore as Ada, including performances before the Prince of Wales at Sandringham and Tsar Alexander III in St Petersburg, the latter during a European tour in which the play was given in Wyndham's own German translation. Moore remained Wyndham's regular leading lady for the rest of his career.

Moore and Wyndham in She Stoops to Conquer, 1890

When Wyndham began to produce and star in the plays of Henry Arthur Jones, Moore played his heroines in The Bauble Shop (1893), The Case of Rebellious Susan (1894) and The Liars (1898). Hubert Henry Davies was another dramatist who wrote star parts for her: Mrs Gorringe in Mrs Gorringe's Necklace (1903), Miss Mills in Captain Drew on Leave (1905), and best of all, according to The Times, Mrs Baxter in The Mollusc (1907). As well as new plays, Moore appeared with Wyndham in new productions of classic comedies, playing Grace Harkaway in London Assurance (1890) and Maria in The School for Scandal (1891).

James Albery died in 1889. The professional partnership of Moore and Wyndham became a romantic one after his separation from his first wife, Emma, in 1897, although they did not marry until Emma died in 1916, three years after he retired from acting. Moore accompanied Wyndham on all four of his American tours after 1885. In The Candidate on Broadway in 1889 she reverted to her first role in the piece, Lady Dorothy; and in later Broadway appearances she played Ada Ingott in 1889 and 1904, Mrs Gorringe in 1904–05 and Lady Susan in The Case of Rebellious Susan (1905).

=== Later years ===
From 1896 Moore was Wyndham's business partner. The partnership was highly profitable, owing partly to Moore's head for business. She was Wyndham's partner in the Criterion and the two theatres built for him, Wyndham's and the New (now the Noël Coward Theatre), all three of them remunerative investments.

The Times said of her:

Miss Moore's forte, especially in the last half of her career, was the acting of pretty and alluring fools. She knew to a shade how to make them foolish without making them tiresome, and helpless without being intolerably silly. Contrasted with the voluble wisdom of the characters chiefly affected by Sir Charles Wyndham, these alluring fools made good material for any number of plays, and Miss Moore succeeded in varying the comedy of the type so that each was distinguishable from the others. She kept her youthful looks till well past middle age, and could play young women almost till the last.

After Wyndham's death, in 1919, Moore appeared as Lady Bagley in the comedy Our Mr Hepplewhite at the Criterion, heading a company that included Kate Cutler, Arthur Wontner and the young Leslie Howard. After that she confined her appearances to charity performances. She was president of the Actors' Benevolent Fund, and for the rest of her life remained proprietor of Wyndham's and the New Theatre through Wyndham Theatres Ltd, which she founded in 1924, aided by her stepson Howard Wyndham and her son Bronson Albery. She died at her house in York Terrace, Regent's Park on 6 April 1931, at the age of 69, and was buried alongside Wyndham in Hampstead Cemetery.

Moore's grandchildren included the architect and town planner Jessica Albery, daughter of Irving Albery and his wife, Gertrude Mary, née Jones (daughter of the playwright Henry Arthur Jones).

== Notes, references and sources ==
=== Sources ===
- Hartley, Cathy, ed. (2013). A Historical Dictionary of British Women. London: Routledge. ISBN 978-1-135-35534-0.
- Parker, John, ed. (1922). Who's Who in the Theatre (fourth ed.). London: Sir Isaac Pitman and Sons. OCLC 473894893.
