= James Albery =

English dramatist (1838–1889)

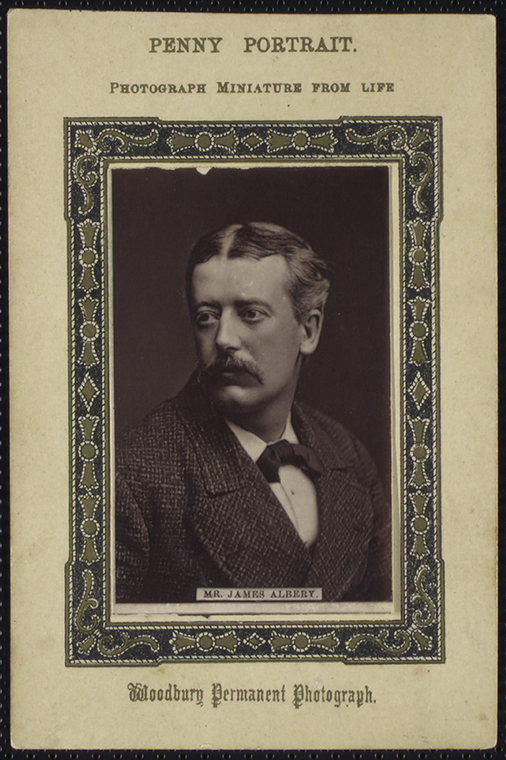
James Albery

James Albery (4 May 1838 – 15 August 1889) was an English dramatist.

== Life and career ==
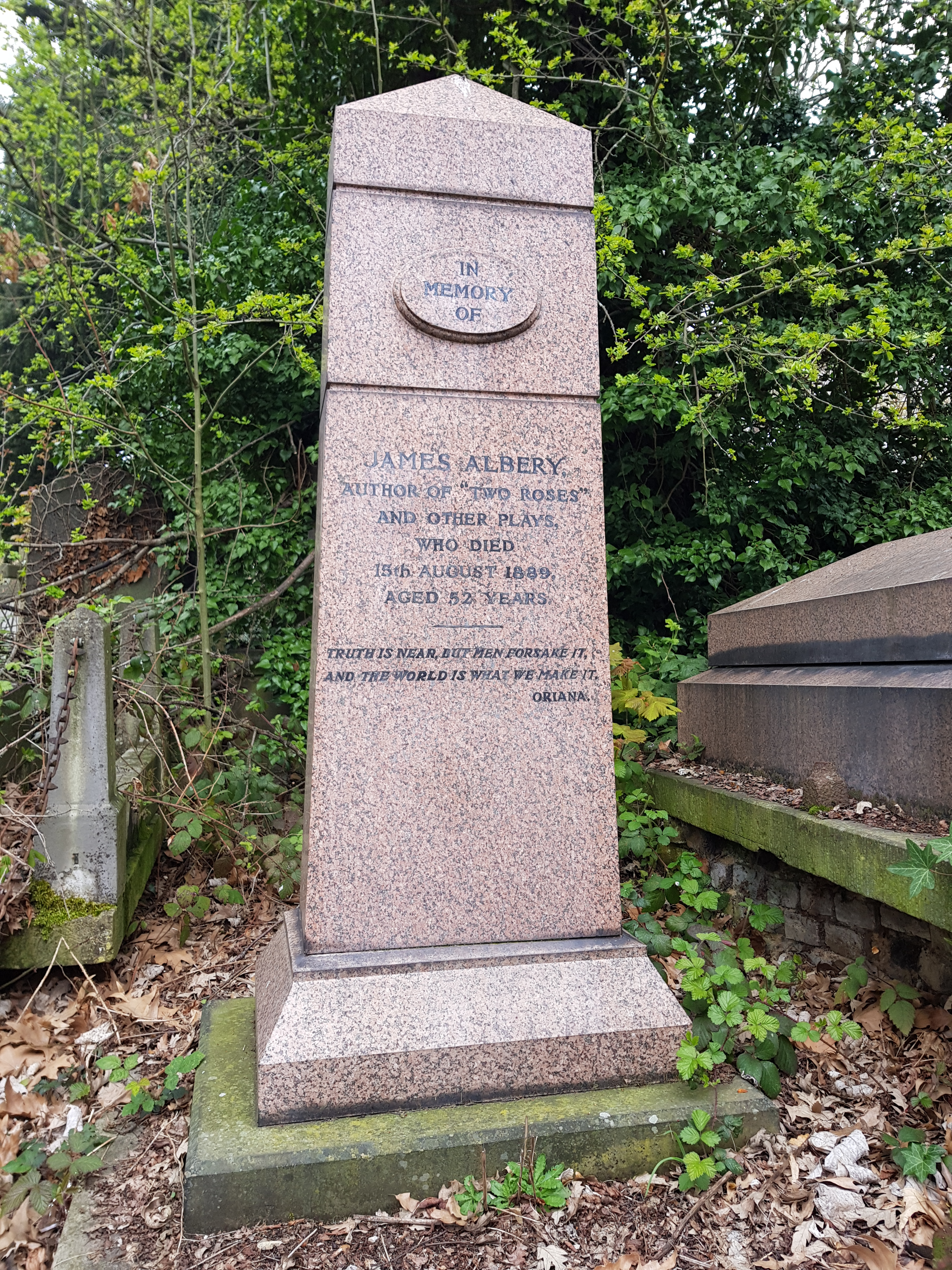
Albery's grave at Kensal Green Cemetery

Albery was born in London. On leaving school he entered an architect's office and started to write plays. His farce A Pretty Piece of Chiselling was given its first production by the Ingoldsby Club in 1864. After some failures, his adaptation, Dr Davy, was produced at the Lyceum Theatre, London (1866). His most successful piece, Two Roses, a comedy, was produced at the Vaudeville Theatre in 1870, in which Sir Henry Irving made one of his earliest London successes as Digby Grant. The production ran for 300 performances.

Albery was the author of a large number of other plays and adaptations, including Coquettes (1870); Pickwick, a four-act drama based on Dickens's The Pickwick Papers (1871); The Pink Dominos (1877), a farce that ran for an extremely successful 555 performances and was one of a series of adaptations from the French which he made for the Criterion Theatre, where his wife, the actress and theatrical manager Mary Moore (who after his death became Lady Wyndham (1861–1931)), played the leading parts; Jingle (a farcical version of Pickwick), produced at the Lyceum in 1878; and Oriana (with music by Frederic Clay).

His one-act operetta, The Spectre Knight, with music by Alfred Cellier, was produced by Richard D'Oyly Carte's opera company and ran as a companion piece to Gilbert and Sullivan's The Sorcerer and then H.M.S. Pinafore at the Opera Comique in 1878 and on tour. Albery also wrote a book called Where's the Cat? in 1880.

Albery and Moore had three sons: Irving, who became a Conservative Member of Parliament, Bronson, a theatre director after whom the Albery Theatre is named, and Wyndham, a socialist activist. Their granddaughter through Irving was Jessica Albery (1908–1990) an architect and town planner, one of the first professional women architects in the UK. Albery wrote this epitaph for himself:

He slept beneath the moon / He basked beneath the sun; / He lived a life of going-to-do / And died with nothing done.

== Bibliography ==
- 1870 – Two Roses

== Sources ==
- Albery's plays are collected in a two-volume edition at the British Library at 2303 f. 14.
- The Dramatic Works of James Albery, together with a sketch of his career, correspondence bearing thereon, press notices, casts, etc. 2 Volumes. Peter Davies, London, 1939.
