= Bronson Albery =

British theatre director (1881–1971)

Sir Bronson Albery
- Albery in 1935
- Born: Bronson James Albery; 6 March 1881
- Died: 21 July 1971 (aged 90)
- Occupations: Theatre director, impresario

Sir Bronson James Albery (6 March 1881 – 21 July 1971) was an English theatre director and impresario. Albery was knighted in 1949 for his services to the theatre. The Albery Theatre in London was named in his honour and his elder son, Sir Donald Albery, was also a theatrical impresario.

Bronson was second son of dramatist, James Albery, and stage actress, Mary Moore. He was a brother to politicians, Irving Albery & Wyndham Albery. Albery married Una Gwynn Rolleston.

By 1953, Sir Bronson Albery was the name over the Criterion Theatre, leased from The Wyndham Theatres Ltd and licensed by the Lord Chamberlain.
