= Jessica Mary Albery =

British architect and town planner (1908–1990)

Jessica Albery FRIBA
- Born: 11 June 1908
- Died: 16 January 1990 (aged 81)
- Education: Architectural Association, London,
- Occupations: Architect, urban planner
- Children: 2 (adopted)

Jessica Albery FRIBA (11 June 1908 – 16 January 1990) was a British architect and town planner, and one of the first generation of professional women architects in the UK in the early 20th century.

== Early life and education ==
Jessica Mary Albery was born in London on 11 June 1908, the only daughter and the eldest of the three children of Irving Albery, a wealthy stockbroker who was later Conservative MP for Gravesend (1924–45) and was knighted in 1936 for political and public services, and of his wife, Gertrude ("Jill") Mary, née Jones (1884–1967). Both parents came from theatrical families. Her paternal grandparents were actress and theatrical manager Mary Moore (later Lady Wyndham) and actor and playwright James Albery. Her maternal grandfather was playwright Henry Arthur Jones, a creative artistic background which inspired her.

Albery was the god-daughter of Eleanor ("Nellie") Farjeon, the author, poet, biographer, historian, satirist, journalist, broadcaster and award-winner. Farjeon lived much of her life among the literary and theatrical circles of London, and she had a wide range of friends with great literary talent. Albery remained close to her godmother for the whole of her life.

Albery's mother encouraged her to study architecture, however neither of her parents ever expected or encouraged her to become a 'serious professional'.

Albery was not educated at an ordinary school as was typical of middle-class girls of the time, but rather she was educated by a private governess, and subsequently at a small private finishing school in Paris for a brief time. Her two younger male siblings were sent to school in the ordinary way.

She trained at the Architectural Association School of Architecture, in London, for five years in the late 1920s alongside fellow students and life-long close friends Judith Ledeboer, Justin Blanco White, and Mary Beaumont Crowley (later Medd), all of whom had received a proper education, unlike Albery. At the AA they all developed a commitment to housing reform and to social concerns which impacted upon their later careers.

== Works and career ==
As there was little work available at the time when she completed her training, Albery began her career by observing buildings under construction in the City of London, including Sir Edwin Cooper's Royal Mail Office, thereby learning in a hands-on way from close contact with foremen, clerks of works and the wider building trades.

Albery then worked with her fellow student from the Architectural Association and life-long friend Judith Ledeboer. During the 1930s Albery actually worked as an architect in Ledeboer's office and also in that of another former Architectural Association student, Judith Townsend.

It was in this period that Albery designed and built five chalk pisé houses, influenced by the Arts and Crafts style, near Andover, Hampshire. These chalk houses were built by local labourers under a foreman supervised by Albery, drawing upon her personal experience of working on building sites.

During part of the Second World War, Albery worked as a volunteer ambulance driver for the London Auxiliary Ambulance Service. During this time, Albery also moved into working on town planning in Middlesbrough and later on the development of Basildon as a new town.

As an entry in a design competition, Albery submitted plans for housing on the site of Churchill Gardens, Pimlico, but these remained unbuilt, with the site now being occupied by a Powell & Moya designed scheme.

Albery continued to work as an architect, but later became assistant regional planning officer to the Ministry of Town and Country Planning. Albery also worked in the Kent County Planning Office at Maidstone, Kent.

Albery was a member, later a Fellow, of the Royal Institute of British Architects (RIBA). Along with Judith Ledeboer, Jane Drew and Elizabeth Denby, Albery was a member of the RIBA Housing Group, and together with them, published a report in 1944 on the future of housing. She was also a member, later a Fellow, of the Royal Town Planning Institute, and held a Diploma in Town Planning. Albery was a member of the Institute of Landscape Architects (now the Landscape Institute).

Albery taught the principles of architecture and building construction at The Brixton School of Building.

Albery became one of Her Majesty's Town & Country Planning Inspectors at the Ministry of Housing & Local Government (later the Department of the Environment), conducting public planning enquiries across the country.

=== Farningham works ===
Between 1953 and 1954, Albery designed the construction of a family house known as Cobnuts, Sparepenny Lane, in Farningham, Kent, for her parents. Albery's parents provided no financial assistance towards the cost of Cobnuts, but they allowed Albery and her two young children to live in their home, The Manor House, whilst Cobnuts was being built for them, about one-half mile away enabling Albery to be on site at Cobnuts virtually every day to personally supervise the project.

Cobnuts was known for having a roof made of copper rather than traditional materials, which over time turned into a shade of bright green. The large garden at Cobnuts was designed and landscaped by Albery's friend the landscape architect and garden designer Sylvia Crowe (later Dame Sylvia Crowe DBE).

The project was built on one of five plots of land on a large freehold site which Albery had purchased. Albery sold off the other four plots to various friends, mainly fellow architects, who then designed and built their own houses on those other four plots.

The Farningham Village Hall was designed by Albery in the late 1930's, upon land donated to the village by her father (Sir Irving Albery). In 1968 and 1982 she oversaw the addition of a side and back extension respectively, with the back extension including a new room named in her honour.

Although eventually funds did not actually permit any works to go ahead, Albery at one stage drew up plans to create a Community Space within or near the Bell Tower of her local church, The Church of St Peter & St Paul's, Farningham, Kent.

Albery did a relatively large amount of unpaid voluntary work in designing and supervising works to almshouses in Kent and the surrounding area. Albery also designed, and personally supervised works to, a number of private houses in Farningham and elsewhere.

== Personal life ==
Albery did not marry but adopted two very young boys in the early 1950s, whom she saw through public school. Both of them became lawyers in later life.

In politics Albery became increasingly left-wing. She was an enthusiastic supporter of the Campaign for Nuclear Disarmament, and frequently attended the Women's Peace Camp near RAF Greenham Common, Berkshire to protest against the presence of nuclear weapons. Albery claimed that people became increasingly left-wing as they grew older. In younger life she had been an enthusiastic canvasser for her father, the Conservative candidate and MP.

Despite not being interested in pursuing sports competitively, with the exception of tennis, Albery was a keen croquet player and swimmer, both in the sea and in the local river at Farningham. In her youth Albery had been a keen and enthusiastic ski-er, and in later years Albery took up body surfing on the north Cornish coast.

Albery was a member both of the National Trust and English Heritage.

Despite being a member of the Church of England, Albery did not believe all conventional doctrine (such as the whole the Apostles' Creed, or each and every one of the 39 Articles). She regularly attended the Church of St Peter & St Paul's, her local village church in Farningham, each Sunday upon a weekly basis, and was a long-standing and dedicated member of the Farningham Parochial Church Council. For many years, Albery was also the Parish of Farningham's specially-chosen unpaid Representative or Delegate on the Deanery Synod of the Diocese of Rochester.

Always interested in literary matters, and with an library of her own, Albery was a supporter of the local Sevenoaks Poetry Society. This particular Society held regular monthly poetry recitals in the private houses of its members, often held at Cobnuts.

Albery took an interest in the theatre in general, and in her two local amateur dramatic societies in particular.

One of Albery's favourite sayings was "moderation in all things". She faithfully observed this rule herself, with exceptions of the time and effort which she regularly devoted to gardening (with the result that in later life she was often physically exhausted), and to the large amounts of money which she annually gave to her carefully-chosen charities. At the end of each calendar year, it was her practice to add up her earned and private income, to deduct her annual and relatively modest outgoings and expenses, and then to give the entire surplus to charity. This fact became known only after her death.

Albery died of cancer on 16 January 1990 at the age of 81 at her new home in Farningham (the Garden House). Immediately following her death, the Royal Institute of British Architects (the RIBA) requested Albery's family to let the RIBA have all of Albery's surviving architectural drawings, in order for them to be archived by the RIBA itself. Albery's family duly complied with this request.
