= Lillian Hellman: An Imperious Life =

2014 book by Dorothy Gallagher

- Editor: Dorothy Gallagher
- Language: English
- Subject: non-fiction, biography
- Published: 2014 (Yale University Press)
- Publication place: United States
- Media type: Print (hardback, paperback)
- Pages: 224
- ISBN: 9780300164978
- OCLC: 865109879

Lillian Hellman: An Imperious Life is a 2014 book by Dorothy Gallagher. It is a critical biography of the American playwright and writer Lillian Hellman.

== Reception ==
The New York Journal of Books gave a critical review of Lillian Hellman writing "it seems like a professional hit job." and, although acknowledging that Gallagher "is convincing" over the controversy of Hellman's "Julia", concluded "It seems, indeed, that author Gallagher and her subject share more in common when it comes to the art of subterfuge." The Library Journal was also critical, highlighting, amongst other things, Gallagher's apparent selective sourcing, her emphasis on Hellman's "less admiral aspects" and that "Hellman's testimony at the McCarthy hearings is presented as more self-preserving than principled." It advised reading "instead Deborah Martinson's Lillian Hellman: A Life with Foxes."

Other reviews were less critical, with Choice writing " Drawing on four full-scale biographies as well as Hellman's three memoirs, this is a concise and useful overview of a tumultuous life. .. Highly recommended." and Booklist wrote "Gallagher pounces on and decisively dissects the choicest bits in Hellman's colorful and contrary life of artistic excellence and blinkered radicalism, self-mythologizing and egregious lies, creating a fast-flowing, deeply provocative portrait of a seductive, truculent, and audacious literary powerhouse."

Lillian Hellman has also been reviewed by Publishers Weekly, Pasatiempo, The New York Times, the Jewish Book Council, and Kirkus Reviews.
