= Julia (1977 film) =

American political drama film by Fred Zinnemann

- Theatrical release poster by Richard Amsel
- Directed by: Fred Zinnemann
- Screenplay by: Alvin Sargent
- Based on: "Julia" in Pentimento by Lillian Hellman
- Produced by: Richard Roth
- Starring: Jane Fonda; Vanessa Redgrave; Jason Robards; Hal Holbrook; Rosemary Murphy; Maximilian Schell
- Cinematography: Douglas Slocombe
- Edited by: Walter Murch; Marcel Durham
- Music by: Georges Delerue
- Production company: 20th Century Fox
- Distributed by: 20th Century Fox
- Release date: October 2, 1977
- Running time: 118 minutes
- Country: United States
- Language: English
- Budget: $7.84 million
- Box office: $20.7 million (domestic)

Julia is a 1977 American political drama film directed by Fred Zinnemann and written by Alvin Sargent. It is based on a chapter from Lillian Hellman's 1973 book Pentimento about the author's relationship with a lifelong friend, Julia, who fought against the Nazis in the years prior to World War II. The film stars Jane Fonda as Hellman and Vanessa Redgrave as Julia. It co-stars Jason Robards, Hal Holbrook, Rosemary Murphy, Maximilian Schell, and Meryl Streep (in her film debut).

Julia released theatrically on October 2, 1977, by 20th Century Fox. The film received positive reviews from critics and grossed $20.7 million against a $7 million budget. It received a leading 11 nominations at the 50th Academy Awards, including Best Picture, and won three awards: Best Supporting Actor (for Robards), Best Supporting Actress (for Redgrave) and Best Adapted Screenplay.

== Plot ==
Young Lillian Hellman and her friend Julia, who is being raised by her wealthy grandparents in the United States, enjoy a close friendship from childhood into late adolescence. Later, Julia studies medicine at the University of Oxford and the University of Vienna and studies with such luminaries as Sigmund Freud. Lillian, a writer, struggles through revisions of her play with her mentor and lover, famed author Dashiell Hammett, at a beach house.

Julia's university in Vienna is overrun by Nazi thugs, and she is severely injured trying to protect others. Lillian receives word of Julia's condition and rushes to Vienna to be with her. Julia is taken away for "treatment", and Lillian is unable to find her again since the hospital denies any knowledge of her being treated there. She remains in Europe to find Julia but is unsuccessful.

Later, during the Nazi era, Lillian, now a celebrated playwright, is invited to a writers' conference in the USSR. Julia, battling against Nazism, enlists Lillian en route to smuggle money into Germany to assist the anti-Nazi cause. It is a dangerous mission, especially for a Jewish intellectual on her way to Russia.

Lillian departs for the USSR via Berlin, and the movements of her person, and the placement of her possessions (a hat and a box of candy), are carefully guided by Julia's colleagues through border crossings and inspections. In Berlin, Lillian is directed to a cafe, where she finds Julia. They speak only briefly. Julia divulges that the "treatment" she received in the hospital in Vienna was a leg amputation. Julia says the money Lillian has brought will save 500 to 1,000 people, many who are Jews. Lillian also learns that Julia has a daughter, Lilly, who is living with a baker in Alsace. After Lilian leaves Julia in the cafe and boards the train to Moscow, a man warns her to avoid passing through Germany again after leaving the USSR.

When Lillian reaches Moscow, the atmosphere is gloomy and oppressive. She receives word that Julia is dead. Returning to London, she is told that Julia was killed in a friend's Frankfurt apartment by Nazi agents, though the details are shrouded in secrecy. Lillian unsuccessfully looks for Julia's daughter in Alsace. She returns to the United States and reunites with Dashiell Hammett. She is haunted by Julia's memories and distraught over not finding Julia's toddler. She is shocked that Julia's family pretends not to remember Lillian as Julia's friend, clearly wanting to excise memories a non-conformist granddaughter who refused to conform at a time when conformity caused many innocent people's deaths.

The film ends with an image of Lillian Hellman many years later seated in a boat alone, fishing. She reveals in voice over that she continued to live with Hammett for another thirty years and outlived him.

== Cast ==
- Jane Fonda as Lillian
- Vanessa Redgrave as Julia
- Jason Robards as Hammett
- Hal Holbrook as Alan
- Rosemary Murphy as Dottie
- Maximilian Schell as Johann
- Dora Doll as Woman Passenger
- Elisabeth Mortensen as Girl Passenger
- Meryl Streep as Anne Marie
- John Glover as Sammy
- Lisa Pelikan as Young Julia
- Susan Jones as Young Lillian
- Maurice Denham as Undertaker
- Gerard Buhr as Passport Officer
- Cathleen Nesbitt as Grandmother
- Lambert Wilson as Walter Franz

The film marked the film debut of Lisa Pelikan and Meryl Streep.

== Production ==
Julia was shot on location in England and France. Although Lillian Hellman claimed the story was based on true events that occurred early in her life, the filmmakers later came to believe that most of it was fictionalized. Director Fred Zinnemann would later comment, "Lillian Hellman in her own mind owned half the Spanish Civil War, while Hemingway owned the other half. She would portray herself in situations that were not true. An extremely talented, brilliant writer, but she was a phony character, I'm sorry to say. My relations with her were very guarded and ended in pure hatred."

The film was based on the "Julia" chapter of Hellman's memoir Pentimento. On June 30, 1976, as the film was going into production, Hellman wrote about the screenplay to its producer:

This is not a work of fiction and certain laws have to be followed for that reason ... Your major difficulty to me is the treatment of Lillian as the leading character. The reason is simple: no matter what she does in this story–and I do not deny the danger I was in when I took the money into Germany–my role was passive. And nobody and nothing can change that unless you write a fictional and different story ... Isn't it necessary to know that I am a Jew? That, of course, is what mainly made the danger.

In a 1979 television interview with Dick Cavett, author Mary McCarthy, long Hellman's political adversary and the object of her negative literary judgment, said of Hellman that "every word she writes is a lie, including 'and' and 'the'." Hellman responded by filing a US$2,500,000 defamation suit against McCarthy, interviewer Dick Cavett, and PBS. McCarthy produced evidence she said proved that Hellman had lied in some accounts of her life. Cavett said he sympathized more with McCarthy than Hellman in the lawsuit, but "everybody lost" as a result of it. Norman Mailer attempted unsuccessfully to mediate the dispute through an open letter he published in the New York Times. At the time of her death in 1984, Hellman was still in litigation with McCarthy; her executors dropped the suit.

In 1983, New York psychiatrist Muriel Gardiner became involved in the libel suit between McCarthy and Hellman. She claimed to be the model for the character named Julia in Pentimento, and in the movie Julia based on a chapter of that book. Hellman, who never met Gardiner, said that "Julia" was somebody else.

Gardiner wrote that, while she never met Hellman, she had often heard about her from her friend Wolf Schwabacher, who was Hellman's lawyer. By Gardiner's account, Schwabacher had visited Gardiner in Vienna. After Muriel Gardiner and Joseph Buttinger moved into their house at Brookdale Farm in Pennington, New Jersey in 1940, they divided the house in two. They rented half of it to Wolf and Ethel Schwabacher for more than ten years.

Many people believe that Hellmann based her story on Gardiner's life. Gardiner's editor cited the unlikelihood that there were two millionaire American women who were medical students in Vienna in the late 1930s.

== Reception ==
Julia holds a 73% rating on Rotten Tomatoes based on 30 reviews, with an average rating of 6.7/10. The consensus summarizes: "Julia is a handsomely crafted and stirringly performed meditation on friendship and political activism, although its tasteful formalism often undercuts the multifaceted passion of these historical figures." On Metacritic, the film earned a weighted average score of 58 out of 100, based on 6 reviews, signifying "mixed or average" reviews.

Variety gave it a positive review, praising Jane Fonda and Vanessa Redgrave as being "dynamite together on the screen", Richard Roth's production as "handsome and tasteful", as well as the period costumes and production design. Frederic and Mary Ann Brussat of Spirituality & Practice described the film as "extraordinary", writing: "Julia gives us a genuine and affecting portrait of a friendship between two women who confirm each other and strengthen their bonds over the years."

The film received some criticism as failing to adequately portray the friendship between the two leads. Roger Ebert called the film a "fascinating story", but felt the film suffered from being told by Lillian Hellman's point of view. "The film never really establishes a relationship between the two women," he wrote. "It's awkward, the way the film has to suspend itself between Julia – its ostensible subject – and Lillian Hellman, its real subject." He gave it two and a half out of four stars.

John Simon said of Julia "Very little of what happens in the film is intrinsically interesting." TV Guide gave it three out of five stars and declared it "Beautifully crafted, nominated for 11 Academy Awards, a big hit at the box office--and a dramatic dud ... If you like red nail polish, faux-cynicism, painfully brave smiles and European train stations, Julia may be your kind of cocktail."

Pauline Kael for The New Yorker called the film "romantic in such a studied way that it turns romanticism into a moral lesson."

The film earned $7.5 million in North American rentals.

== Awards and nominations ==
Award	Category	Nominee(s)	Result	Ref.
Academy Awards	Best Picture	Richard Roth	Nominated	
Academy Awards	Best Director	Fred Zinnemann	Nominated	
Academy Awards	Best Actress	Jane Fonda	Nominated	
Academy Awards	Best Supporting Actor	Jason Robards	Won	
Academy Awards	Best Supporting Actor	Maximilian Schell	Nominated	
Academy Awards	Best Supporting Actress	Vanessa Redgrave	Won	
Academy Awards	Best Screenplay – Based on Material from Another Medium	Alvin Sargent	Won	
Academy Awards	Best Cinematography	Douglas Slocombe	Nominated	
Academy Awards	Best Costume Design	Anthea Sylbert	Nominated	
Academy Awards	Best Film Editing	Walter Murch (Note: Marcel Durham is listed as an editor for the film in some credit listings for Julia, including the credits database of the Academy of Motion Picture Arts & Sciences (AMPAS). However, he is not listed as a nominee for the Academy Award in the AMPAS awards database.)	Nominated	
Academy Awards	Best Original Score	Georges Delerue	Nominated	
British Academy Film Awards	Best Film	Richard Roth	Won	
British Academy Film Awards	Best Direction	Fred Zinnemann	Nominated	
British Academy Film Awards	Best Actress in a Leading Role	Jane Fonda	Won	
British Academy Film Awards	Best Actor in a Supporting Role	Jason Robards	Nominated	
British Academy Film Awards	Best Screenplay	Alvin Sargent	Won	
British Academy Film Awards	Best Cinematography	Douglas Slocombe	Won	
British Academy Film Awards	Best Costume Design	Anthea Sylbert, Joan Bridge, and Annalisa Nasalli-Rocca	Nominated	
British Academy Film Awards	Best Editing	Walter Murch	Nominated	
British Academy Film Awards	Best Original Music	Georges Delerue	Nominated	
British Academy Film Awards	Best Production Design	Gene Callahan, Carmen Dillon, and Willy Holt	Nominated	
British Society of Cinematographers Awards	Best Cinematography in a Theatrical Feature Film	Douglas Slocombe	Won	
César Awards	Best Foreign Film	Fred Zinnemann	Nominated	
David di Donatello Awards	Best Foreign Actress	Jane Fonda	Won (Note: Tied with Simone Signoret for Madame Rosa.)	
David di Donatello Awards	David Giovani Award	Fred Zinnemann	Won	
Directors Guild of America Awards	Outstanding Directorial Achievement in Motion Pictures	Fred Zinnemann	Nominated	
Golden Globe Awards	Best Motion Picture – Drama		Nominated	
Golden Globe Awards	Best Actress in a Motion Picture – Drama	Jane Fonda	Won	
Golden Globe Awards	Best Supporting Actor – Motion Picture	Jason Robards	Nominated	
Golden Globe Awards	Best Supporting Actor – Motion Picture	Maximilian Schell	Nominated	
Golden Globe Awards	Best Supporting Actress – Motion Picture	Vanessa Redgrave	Won	
Golden Globe Awards	Best Director – Motion Picture	Fred Zinnemann	Nominated	
Golden Globe Awards	Best Screenplay – Motion Picture	Alvin Sargent	Nominated	
Kansas City Film Critics Circle Awards	Best Supporting Actor	Jason Robards	Won	
Kansas City Film Critics Circle Awards	Best Supporting Actress	Vanessa Redgrave	Won	
Los Angeles Film Critics Association Awards	Best Supporting Actor	Jason Robards	Won	
Los Angeles Film Critics Association Awards	Best Supporting Actress	Vanessa Redgrave	Won	
Los Angeles Film Critics Association Awards	Best Cinematography	Douglas Slocombe	Won	
Nastro d'Argento	Best Foreign Director	Fred Zinnemann	Won	
National Board of Review Awards	Top Ten Films		3rd Place	
National Society of Film Critics Awards	Best Actress	Jane Fonda	3rd Place	
National Society of Film Critics Awards	Best Supporting Actor	Maximilian Schell	3rd Place	
New York Film Critics Circle Awards	Best Supporting Actor	Maximilian Schell	Won	
New York Film Critics Circle Awards	Best Supporting Actress	Vanessa Redgrave	Runner-up	
Writers Guild of America Awards	Best Drama – Adapted from Another Medium	Alvin Sargent	Won	

After Redgrave was nominated for the Academy Award for Best Supporting Actress, the Jewish Defense League objected to her nomination because she had narrated and helped fund a documentary entitled The Palestinian, which supported a Palestinian state. They also picketed the Oscar ceremony.
