= Nik Cohn =

British music critic

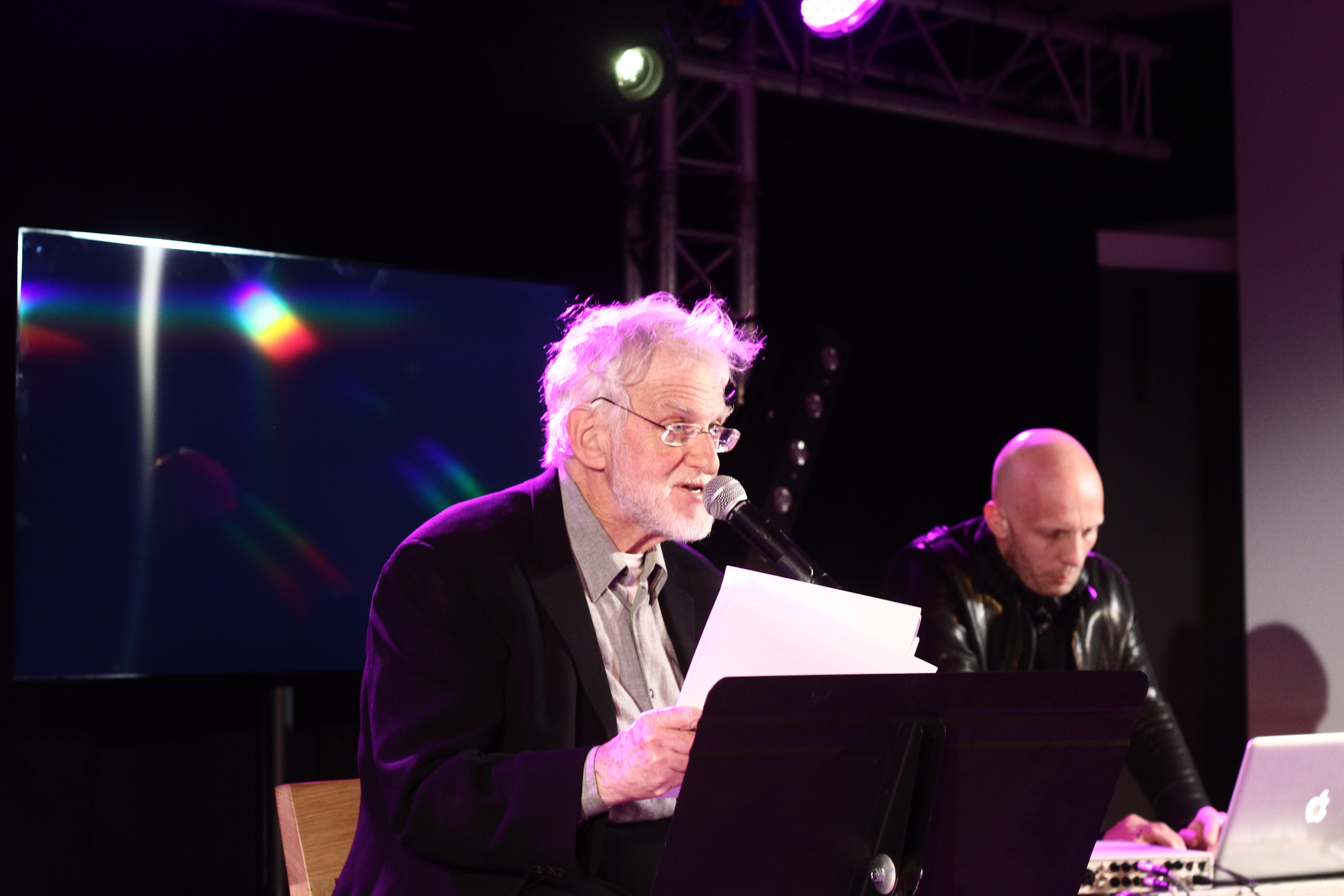
- Cohn in 2014
- Born: 1946 (age 79–80); London, England
- Occupations: Writer, music critic
- Years active: 1960s–present

Nik Cohn (born 1946), also written Nick Cohn, is a British writer.

== Life and career ==
Cohn was born in London, England and brought up in Derry in Northern Ireland. He is the son of historian Norman Cohn and Russian writer Vera Broido. An incomer to the tight-knit town, he spent most of his time at the local record shop and the walk there, from his home on campus at Magee University College, inspired one of his earliest stories, "Delinquent in Derry". He left the city to attend the Royal Grammar School in Newcastle upon Tyne in England, then moved to London.

Cohn is considered by some critics to have helped originate rock criticism while writing columns for Queen. His first major book, Awopbopaloobop Alopbamboom, was first published in 1969. Cohn has since published articles, novels and music books regularly.

When reviewing a rough mix of the Who's rock opera Tommy, he told the group members that the album lacked a hit single. Hearing this, Pete Townshend decided to take the song "Pinball Wizard", which he had already written knowing that Cohn was a fan of pinball, and incorporate it into the rock opera. Cohn also panned The Beatles and Abbey Road upon their release in reviews for The New York Times.

It has long been rumoured that Cohn's novel I Am Still the Greatest Says Johnny Angelo was an inspiration for David Bowie's album The Rise and Fall of Ziggy Stardust and the Spiders from Mars.

He wrote the 1976 New York article "Tribal Rites of the New Saturday Night", which was the source material for the movie Saturday Night Fever. In 1996, Cohn revealed the article to have been a complete fabrication, based only on clubgoers he knew from his native England.

In the early 1980s, he was indicted on drug trafficking charges for importing $4 million worth of Indian heroin. He refused to give a testimony and the trafficking charges were subsequently dropped. Instead, he was given five years' probation and fined $5,000 for possession.

Cohn was a columnist for The Guardian in the mid- to late 1990s as he researched his book on the underbelly of England, Yes We Have No: Adventures in the Other England. He is also a regular contributor to Granta. In 2016, Awopbopaloobop Alopbamboom was listed by The Guardian's Robert McCrum as one of the "100 Best Nonfiction Books of All Time." It and The Heart of the World were subsequently reissued by Penguin UK's Vintage Classics imprint.

== Bibliography ==
Fiction

- Market (1965)
- I Am Still the Greatest Says Johnny Angelo (1967)
- Arfur (1973)
- King Death (1975)
- Need (1997)
- Manhattan Babylon (1999)

Non-Fiction

- Awopbopaloobop Alopbamboom: The Golden Age of Rock (1968) - Revised 1972
- ROCK -From The Beginning (1969)
- Today There are No Gentlemen (1971)
- Rock Dreams (1974) - Cohn, Nik & Peellaert, Guy
- The Elvis years (1975) - Magazine
- The Rolling Stones: A celebration (1975)
- Ball the Wall: Nik Cohn in the Age of Rock (1989)
- The Heart of the World (1992)
- Yes We Have No: Adventures in the Other England (1999)
- Twentieth Century Dreams (1999) - Cohn, Nik & Peellaert, Guy
- Soljas (2002) - Cohn, Nik & Dorner, Julia|
- Triksta : Life and Death and New Orleans Rap (2005)
- Bye Bye, Bye Baby, Bye Bye (2009) - with Michael Herr, Elisabeth Peellaert
- The Noise From the Streets (2014)
- Raoul Hausmann: Photographs 1927 - 1936 (2018) - Bargues, Cecile (author, editor) & Cohn, Nik (author) & Barriet, David (editor) & Benassayag, David (editor) & Didier, Beatrice (editor)
