= Gerald Busby =

American composer (born 1935)

- Born: December 16, 1935 (age 90); Tyler, Texas, U.S.
- Education: Yale University
- Occupation: Composer
- Known for: 3 Women (film), Runes (dance)

Gerald Busby (born December 16, 1935) is an American composer.

== Biography ==
Busby was born in Tyler, Texas, United States. (Note: In the interview with Adam Gopnik, he indicated that there was a Baptist minister as part of his growing up.) He studied piano as a child, playing with the Houston Symphony when he was 15 years old. He attended Yale University in New Haven, Connecticut, where he studied music in college, but once graduated, began working as a traveling salesman. At the age of 40, he had an "epiphany" and began to compose, a direction that surprised him.

In 1977, with the assistance of composer Virgil Thomson, Busby moved to the Hotel Chelsea in New York City, where he has written most of his work. Living at the Hotel Chelsea brought him into contact with numerous cultural figures. One of them was dancer Rudolf Nureyev and his then-partner Wallace Potts.

Potts gave choreographer Paul Taylor a recording of Busby's music, which led to Busby writing the score for Taylor's dance Runes. Regarding his scores for Paul Taylor's dance Runes and Robert Altman's film 3 Women, Busby said: "Those two pieces are acknowledged as masterpieces, so that I know they'll last beyond me. ... Not because what I did was a masterpiece, but I was part of it."

In 1985, Busby was diagnosed with HIV, as was his partner Samuel Byers. Byers died on December 14, 1993; the couple had been together for 18 years. "Sam's death was just unbearable...He lost his mind and withered away. I was there the whole time with him and taking care of him, so I just went nuts." After a bout of depression and drug addiction, Busby became sober and began composing again.

In 2007, his monthly income amounted to $658 from Social Security, $78 in disability payments, and $156 in food stamps. Income from his music was undependable; in a good month he could get $1,000, or nothing. The New York Times described him as one of its "most neediest cases". Through the Federation of Protestant Welfare Agencies, Busby was able to receive $754.96 for digitizing recordings originally made on perishable cassette tape.

Despite being HIV positive, he has claimed that his immune system has regenerated, something he attributes to his daily practice of reiki. As of 2015, he continued to live at the Hotel Chelsea.

His memoir Getting Saved: Coming Out as a Gay Man and a Composer [memoir] by Gerald Busby is scheduled to be released in January 2027 by Finishing Line Press.

== Notes and references ==
Notes

=== Sources ===
- Gopnik, Adam (June 15, 2015). "The Last Living Bohemian in Chelsea Tells All". The New Yorker.
- Rehrmann, Alexis (December 16, 2007). "Back from the Edge, and Living His Life Note by Note". The New York Times.
