= Wolf Schwabacher =

American lawyer

Wolf Schwabacher (died 1951) was a prominent Jewish entertainment lawyer, a partner in the New York City law firm of Hays, Wolf, Schwabacher, Sklar & Epstein, whose clients included the Marx Brothers, Lillian Hellman, and Erskine Caldwell.

He married Ethel Schwabacher in 1934. She was a protegee of Arshile Gorky, his first biographer, and herself a well-known abstract impressionist painter. Brenda Webster, their daughter, is an American writer. After World War II they lived on the Upper East Side. Dorothy Parker was a social acquaintance.

Wolf and Ethel Schwabacher shared a house with the psychoanalyst Muriel Gardiner and her husband, the Austrian socialist Joseph Buttinger, for more than ten years. After Gardiner and Buttinger, fleeing from Europe after the start of World War II, moved into their house at Brookdale Farm in central New Jersey in 1940. The house was divided in two, the Gardiner-Buttingers living in one part of the house and the Schwabachers in the other.

The Schwabacher-Gardiner connection came to public attention during the libel suit Hellman brought against Mary McCarthy.

When Hellman published her memoir, Pentimento (1973), Gardiner spotted the close similarity between her own anti-Fascist activities in Vienna in the 1930s and the story Hellman told about a pseudonymous friend called Julia. Gardiner wrote to Hellman asking for an explanation, but Hellman never replied.

Hellman, who never met Gardiner, claimed that her Julia was somebody else. Many people believe otherwise, citing the vanishingly low probability that there were two millionaire American medical students in Vienna in the late 1930s who married the head of a resistance movement and were active in that movement. It is believed that Hellman learned Gardiner's story from Schwabacher who had visited Gardiner in Vienna in the 1930s and whose garrulous nature made it very likely that he had related the story of Gardiner's activities to his contacts.

== Sources ==
- McDowell, Edwin (April 29, 1983). "Publishing: New Memoir Stirs 'Julia' Controversy". The New York Times.
- The Last Good Freudian, Brenda Webster, Book - Barnes & Noble. Retrieved 2008-12-07.
