= Ira M. Lapidus =

American historian (born 1937)

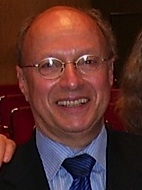
- Born: 9 June 1937 (age 89); Brooklyn, New York, U.S.
- Education: Harvard University
- Occupations: Professor Emeritus of History, Author
- Spouse: Brenda Webster
- Writing career
- Subjects: Middle Eastern and Islamic History
- Notable work: A History of Islamic Societies
- Website: history.berkeley.edu/people/ira-m-lapidus

Ira M. Lapidus is an Emeritus Professor of Middle Eastern and Islamic History at The University of California at Berkeley. He is the author of A History of Islamic Societies, and Contemporary Islamic Movements in Historical Perspective, among other works.

== Biography and academic career ==
Lapidus was born and raised in Brooklyn, New York. He was born to immigrant parents, who instilled a sense of the value of education in him and his brother. He attended Jefferson High School in Brooklyn, where a history teacher helped him prepare for admissions tests and suggested he pursue Asian history studies.

Lapidus went on to college and graduate school at Harvard. As an undergraduate at Harvard, he took a course in Middle Eastern history taught by Sir Hamilton Gibb. He enjoyed the class and liked the instructor, who encouraged him to pursue social sciences in addition to history. Lapidus continued taking classes in Middle Eastern and Islamic history, and upon graduation entered a career in academia.

Lapidus began teaching at UC Berkeley in 1965. He primarily taught courses about early Islamic history and Modern Middle East history, but also courses on the history of the Mediterranean and Islam in South and South East Asia. In graduate seminars he taught Islamic history and courses on social science concepts and methods for historians. He has trained graduate students in History, Anthropology, Near Eastern Languages and Literatures, Political Science, Geography and other disciplines. Lapidus has also lectured widely to public audiences, and has frequently been interviewed for television, radio and newspaper articles.

Lapidus was for many years Chairman of the Center for Middle Eastern Studies at Berkeley. He is a past president and director of the Middle East Studies Association (1984), and has served on numerous professional administrative, advisory and review committees including Visiting Committees for Georgetown and Harvard Universities, the Rockefeller Foundation, and the Institute for Advanced Studies. He was a member of United States Middle East Studies delegation to People's Republic of China. He has served on the editorial boards of the Journal of Urban History, Journal of the Economic and Social History of the Orient, and the Journal of Early Modern Europe.

Lapidus regularly visits Rome and other European cities with his wife, the writer Brenda Webster. Over the course of his academic career, he has done research in England, France, Turkey, Egypt, Syria, former Soviet Union, Pakistan, and India, and has traveled extensively in Muslim regions of North Africa, the Middle East, former Soviet Central Asia, India, Indonesia and western China.

== Photography ==
As well as his work in academia, Lapidus is a prolific fine art photographer whose work focuses on street scenes, city spaces, and reflections both literal and metaphorical. He has been exhibited at the A.C.C.I. Gallery in Berkeley, CA, the Club at the Claremont in Oakland, CA, the Fetterly Gallery in Vallejo, CA, and elsewhere. His work has been published in Photo Metro, Women's Studies, Fiction International, and the San Francisco Chronicle. His photos are held in numerous private collections.

== Fellowships, honors and awards ==
- Lifetime Achievement Award, Middle East Medievalists, 2001
- American Philosophical Society, elected member, 1994
- Fellow, Rockefeller Foundation, Bellagio Study Center, 1990

His other notable fellowships include the Social Science Research Council, the Guggenheim, and Mellon Foundations, the Stanford Center for Advanced Study in the Behavioral Sciences, the Hoover Institution, the Ecole Pratique des Hautes Etudes (Paris), and the National Endowment for the Humanities.

== Professional associations ==
- President, Middle East Studies Association, 1983-84
- Director, The Urban History Association, 1990-1996
- Board of Directors, Middle East Studies Association, 1972–75, 1981-85
- Director, Center for Muslim-Christian Understanding, Georgetown, 1992-1996

== Books ==
- Muslim Cities in the Later Middle Ages, 1967, 1984
- Middle Eastern Cities, editor, 1969
- Contemporary Islamic Movements in Historical Perspective, 1984
- Islam, Politics and Social Movements, editor (with Edmund Burke), 1988
- A History of Islamic Societies, 1988, 2002, 2014
- Islamic Societies to the Nineteenth Century: A Global History, 2012
