= Brenda Webster =

American writer, critic and translator (born 1936)

- Born: 1936 (age 89–90); New York City, U.S.
- Education: Swarthmore College, Barnard College, Columbia University, UC Berkeley
- Occupations: Writer; critic; translator
- Spouse: Ira M. Lapidus
- Relatives: Ethel Schwabacher, George Oppen, Wolf Schwabacher
- Writing career
- Language: English
- Notable works: Vienna Triangle, The Beheading Game, The Last Good Freudian
- Website: www.brendawebster.com

Brenda Webster is an American writer, critic and translator. She is the author of five novels, including The Beheading Game (2006) and Vienna Triangle (2009), which appeared on bestseller lists in both the San Francisco Chronicle and the Los Angeles Times. Her most recent novel, After Auschwitz: A Love Story, published in 2013, is a story of an elderly man dealing with the early stages of dementia as he struggles to hold on to his memories and cope with his changing relationship to his wife.

Webster is the current president of PEN West.

== Biography ==
Brenda Webster was born in New York City in 1936, the daughter of abstract expressionist painter Ethel Schwabacher and the prominent entertainment lawyer Wolf Schwabacher. Webster's memoir The Last Good Freudian recounts a privileged childhood that was deeply affected by her family's devotion to Freudian psychology. Webster herself entered psychoanalysis at age 14, but eventually rebelled against what she saw as the patriarchy of orthodox Freudianism.

Webster was educated at Swarthmore College, Barnard College, and Columbia University, and completed doctoral studies at the University of California, Berkeley. She has three children and five grandchildren, and splits her time between Berkeley and Rome. Her husband is Ira M. Lapidus, Professor Emeritus of History at the University of California, Berkeley and author of A History of Islamic Societies.

== Writings ==
Brenda Webster is the author of five novels: Sins of the Mothers, Paradise Farm, The Beheading Game, Vienna Triangle, and After Auschwitz: A Love Story. Her memoir, The Last Good Freudian was published by Holmes and Meier in 2000. Webster also published a translation with Gabriella Romani of Edith Bruck's Holocaust novel, Lettera alla Madre in 2006.

Vienna Triangle, published in Fall of 2009, explores Sigmund Freud's role in the death of a brilliant disciple. Set in the late 1960s, Vienna Triangle follows Kate, a graduate student in psychology at Columbia, as she meets the famed Freudian theorist Helene Deutsch and learns about both the earliest days of psychoanalysis, and her own family's mysterious past.

Webster has also written two critical studies: "Yeats: A Psychoanalytic Study" and "Blake's Prophetic Psychology", which have appeared in several anthologies. She has also translated poetry from the Italian for The Other Voice and The Penguin Book of Women Poets. She is also the co-editor of Hungry for Light: The Journal of Ethel Schwabacher, and wrote the introduction to the Signet Classics edition of Sir Gawain and the Green Knight.

In addition to her novels, translations, and academic books and essays, Webster is a prolific author of fictional short stories. Eleven of these stories were published in the collection Tattoo Bird, published online by FictionNet in 1996, as well as in various journals including Women's Studies, The Chariton Review, Caprice and other literary publications.

== Awards ==
Brenda Webster has been nominated for two Northern California Book Awards (2007).

- Fiction: The Beheading Game by Brenda Webster.
- Translation: Letter to My Mother by Edith Bruck, translated by Brenda Webster.

Her short story Tattoo Bird received an Honorable Mention (second prize) in the H.E. Francis Short Story Competition held by the Ruth Hindman Foundation. It was also twice nominated for a Pushcart Prize.
