= Saturday Night Fever =

1977 film by John Badham

- Theatrical release poster
- Directed by: John Badham
- Screenplay by: Norman Wexler
- Based on: "Tribal Rites of the New Saturday Night" by Nik Cohn
- Produced by: Robert Stigwood
- Starring: John Travolta; Karen Gorney
- Cinematography: Ralf D. Bode
- Edited by: David Rawlins
- Music by: Bee Gees; David Shire
- Production company: Robert Stigwood Organization
- Distributed by: Paramount Pictures
- Release dates: December 12, 1977 (New York City); December 14, 1977 (Mann's Chinese Theatre); December 16, 1977 (United States)
- Running time: 119 minutes
- Country: United States
- Language: English
- Budget: $3.5 million
- Box office: $237.1 million

Saturday Night Fever is a 1977 American dance drama film directed by John Badham and produced by Robert Stigwood. It stars John Travolta as Tony Manero, a young Italian-American man who spends his weekends dancing and drinking at a local disco while dealing with social tensions and disillusionment in his working class ethnic neighborhood in Brooklyn. The story is based on "Tribal Rites of the New Saturday Night", a mostly fictional 1976 New York article by the music writer Nik Cohn.

Released by Paramount Pictures, the film was a major critical and commercial success. Saturday Night Fever had a tremendous impact on the popular culture of the late 1970s. It helped popularize disco music around the world and initiated a series of collaborations between film studios and record labels. It made Travolta, already well known from his role in the popular television sitcom Welcome Back, Kotter, a household name. He was nominated for the Academy Award for Best Actor for his performance, at the time becoming the fourth-youngest nominee in the category. The film showcases aspects of the music, dancing, and subculture surrounding the disco era, including symphony-orchestrated melodies, haute couture styles of clothing, pre-AIDS sexual promiscuity and graceful choreography. The Saturday Night Fever soundtrack, featuring songs by the Bee Gees, is one of the best-selling soundtrack albums worldwide. Travolta reprised his role of Tony Manero for Staying Alive in 1983, which was panned by critics despite box office success.

In 2010, Saturday Night Fever was deemed "culturally, historically, or aesthetically significant" by the Library of Congress and selected for preservation in the United States National Film Registry.

Adjusted for inflation, it is one of the highest-grossing R-rated films released in the U.S. in the 1970s, with a total box office gross of $673,899,098 in 2024.

== Plot ==
Tony Manero is an Italian-American from the Bay Ridge neighborhood of Brooklyn, living in his family's house and working in a hardware store. He escapes his day-to-day life by dancing at 2001 Odyssey, a local discotheque, where he receives the admiration he craves as king of the dance floor.

Tony and his friends Joey, Double J, Gus, and Bobby C. spend their Saturday nights at the disco, trying to have sex with women in Bobby's car, afterwards climbing and taking part in horse play on the Verrazzano–Narrows Bridge. Neighborhood girl Annette is infatuated with Tony, much to his annoyance. However, he agrees to be her partner in an upcoming dance contest. Annette's happiness is short-lived when Tony is mesmerized by a better dancer, Stephanie Mangano, who rejects Tony's advances but eventually agrees to be his new partner in the competition.

Tony is pleased to no longer be the black sheep of the family when his older brother Frank Jr., the pride of their parents and grandmother, quits the Catholic priesthood. Frank Jr admits that he only became a priest to make their parents happy, and later advises Bobby, who is under pressure to marry his pregnant girlfriend, that the Pope is unlikely to grant him a dispensation for an abortion. Leaving to start a new life, Frank encourages Tony to do what makes him happy.

Gus is beaten up and hospitalized, telling his friends that his attackers were the Barracudas, a Puerto Rican gang. Annette grows more and more desperate for Tony's attention, as does Bobby, who tries to ask him for guidance. Tony helps Stephanie move to Manhattan, and comforts her after discovering her past relationship with an older married colleague. Tony and his friends take revenge on the Barracudas, crashing Bobby's car into their hangout and starting a brawl, but are angry to learn that Gus may have identified the wrong gang.

After much practice, Tony and Stephanie dance at the competition, sharing a kiss at the end of their performance. They win first prize, but Tony believes a Puerto Rican couple performed better and the judges' decision was racially biased. He gives the couple his trophy and award money. Outside in Bobby's car, Tony tries to force himself on Stephanie, who declares she was only using him to win before fighting him off and running away.

Tony's friends arrive with Annette. Tony unsuccessfully tries to lead her away and they all drive to the bridge. Joey and Double J rape Annette in the back seat, while Tony and Bobby appear uncomfortable. They arrive to a point on the bridge and climb out. Tony chides an upset Annette, who finally disowns him and runs off crying.

The others begin their usual cable-climbing antics as an erratic Bobby behaves even more recklessly than his friends. Tony tries to talk him down, but Bobby's despair and Tony's broken promise to call him earlier all lead to a suicidal tirade before Bobby falls to his death. The police arrive; when they ask if Bobby intended to kill himself, Tony responds, "There's ways to killing yourself without killing yourself."

A disgusted and disillusioned Tony leaves Double J, Joey, and Annette behind, riding the graffiti-riddled subway into Manhattan. By morning, he appears at Stephanie's apartment and apologizes for his behavior, planning to relocate to Manhattan to start a new life. Stephanie forgives Tony, admitting that she danced with him because he gave her respect and moral support. They salvage their relationship, agreeing to be friends.

== Cast ==
- John Travolta as Anthony "Tony" Manero
- Karen Lynn Gorney as Stephanie Mangano
- Barry Miller as Bobby C.
- Joseph Cali as Joey
- Paul Pape as Double J.
- Donna Pescow as Annette
- Bruce Ornstein as Gus
- Val Bisoglio as Frank Manero Sr.
- Julie Bovasso as Flo Manero
- Martin Shakar as Frank Manero Jr.
- Lisa Peluso as Linda Manero
- Nina Hansen as Grandmother
- Sam Coppola as Dan Fusco
- Denny Dillon as Doreen
- Bert Michaels as Pete
- Fran Drescher as Connie
- Monti Rock III as the DJ
- Robert Weil as Becker
- Shelly Batt as Girl in Disco
- Donald Gantry as Jay Langhart
- Ellen March as Bartender
- William Andrews as Detective
- Robert Costanzo as paint store customer
- Helen Travolta (John's mother) as paint store customer
- Ann Travolta (John's sister) as pizza girl

== Production ==
=== Development ===
The film was inspired by a 1976 New York magazine article entitled "Tribal Rites of the New Saturday Night" by British writer Nik Cohn. The article centers on working class Italian-Americans in Bay Ridge, Brooklyn, and on the lives of young men who work dead-end jobs but live for their nights dancing at the local discotheque. Cohn later wrote that "the [disco] craze had started in black gay clubs, then progressed to straight blacks and gay whites and from there to mass consumption—Latinos in the Bronx, West Indians on Staten Island, and, yes, Italians in Brooklyn." Shortly after Cohn's article was published, British music impresario Robert Stigwood purchased the film rights and hired Cohn to adapt his own article to screen.

In the mid-1990s Cohn acknowledged that although his account was presented as factual reporting, he fabricated most of the article. He said that as a newcomer to the United States and a stranger to the disco lifestyle, he was unable to make any sense of the subculture he had been assigned to write about; instead, the article's protagonist (who would become Tony Manero) was based on an acquaintance of Cohn who was an English mod.

John G. Avildsen was originally hired as the film's director but was replaced one month before principal photography by John Badham over "conceptual disagreements." Badham was a lesser-known director who, like his star, had mostly worked in television. His sole prior film credit, The Bingo Long Traveling All-Stars & Motor Kings, was released while Saturday Night Fever was already well into production. John's younger sister is Mary Badham, who played Scout in To Kill a Mockingbird.

The film went through several different titles, including Tribal Rites of the New Saturday Night and Saturday Night. After the Bee Gees wrote "Night Fever" and submitted it for the soundtrack, they told Stigwood they disliked the title Saturday Night. It was after this that the film's final title of Saturday Night Fever was decided upon.

=== Writing ===
After Cohn finished a single screenplay draft, he was replaced by Norman Wexler, a screenwriter with Oscar nominations for Joe (1970) and Serpico (1973). Among the elements Wexler added to the story was Tony's younger sister, as well as older brother Frank who disappoints his parents by leaving the priesthood. "I think what Norman did so well was to create a family situation that had real truth, an accurate look at how men related to women in that moment, in ways that you would never get away with now," said producer Kevin McCormick.

=== Casting ===
The film's relatively low budget ($3.5 million) meant that most of the actors were relative unknowns, many of whom were recruited from New York's theatre scene. For more than 40% of the actors it was their film debut. The only actor in the cast who was already an established name was John Travolta, thanks to his role on the sitcom Welcome Back, Kotter. Travolta, who had previously auditioned for Stigwood's film version of Jesus Christ Superstar, was remembered by the producer and signed to a three-movie contract with his company in 1976. Stigwood wanted Travolta to first star in a movie version of Grease, but because a film adaptation of Grease was not permitted to begin filming until 1978 when its stage run had completed, they made this film first. Travolta's performance as Tony Manero brought him critical acclaim and helped launch him into international stardom.

Travolta researched the part by visiting the real 2001 Odyssey discotheque, and claimed he adopted many of the character's swaggering mannerisms from the male patrons. Travolta said when he would get recognized, "[Guys'] girlfriends would come up, and they'd say, 'Hey, stay away from him, don't bug Travolta,' and they’d actually push the girls away. Tony Manero's whole male-chauvinist thing I got from watching those guys in the discos." He insisted on performing his character's own dance sequences after producers suggested he be substituted by a body double, rehearsing his choreography with Lester Wilson and Deney Terrio for three hours every day, losing 20 pounds (9.1 kg) in the process. Wilson is credited for providing the look of the dance scenes and "breathing life" into the film. Said Travolta, "He taught me what he called his 'hang time.' He would smoke a cigarette to greet the day, and he infused my dancing with black rhythm. I'm the kind of dancer who needs thought and construction—an idea—before I dance. I need an internal story. Lester would put on some music and he would say, 'Move with me, motherfucker—move with me!'"

Karen Lynn Gorney was nine years older than Travolta when she was cast as his love interest Stephanie. Although Gorney had dance experience before she was cast, she found it difficult to keep up with her co-star due to injuries sustained in a motorcycle accident some years before. After the success of Saturday Night Fever, Gorney took a break from film acting to work as a dance instructor at a performing arts academy in Brooklyn. Jessica Lange, Kathleen Quinlan, Carrie Fisher, and Amy Irving were all considered for the part before Gorney was cast.

Donna Pescow was considered almost "too pretty" by Paramount heads Michael Eisner and Jeffrey Katzenberg for the role of Annette. She corrected this matter by putting on weight. She also had to relearn her native Brooklyn accent, which she had overcome while studying drama at the American Academy of Dramatic Arts.

=== Filming ===
The film was shot entirely on location in Brooklyn, New York. The 2001 Odyssey Disco was a real club located at 802 64th Street, but it has since been demolished. The interior was modified for the film, including the addition of a $15,000 lighted floor, which was inspired by a Birmingham, Alabama establishment that Badham had visited. A similar effect was achieved on the club's walls using tin foil and Christmas lights. Since the Bee Gees were not involved in the production until after principal photography had wrapped, the "Night Fever", "You Should Be Dancin'" and "More Than a Woman" sequences were shot with Stevie Wonder tracks that were later overdubbed in the sound mix. During filming, the production was harassed by local gangs over use of the location, and was even firebombed.

The dance studio was Phillips Dance Studio in Bensonhurst, the Manero home was a house in Bay Ridge and the paint store was Pearson Paint & Hardware, also in Bay Ridge. Other locations included the Verrazzano–Narrows Bridge, John J. Carty Park and the Bay Ridge Promenade.

To avoid Travolta's fans who might disrupt filming, Badham and his team shot exterior scenes as early in the morning as possible, often at the break of dawn. The producers also generated fake call sheets. Badham was usually able to complete the scenes before significant crowds had time to gather.

== Soundtrack ==
Saturday Night Fever

Soundtrack album by Bee Gees and various artists
- Released: November 15, 1977
- Recorded: 1975–1977
- Studios: Château d'Hérouville (France); Criteria Studios (Miami)
- Genre: Disco
- Length: 75:54
- Label: RSO
- Producer: Bill Oakes (music supervisor)

Bee Gees chronology
Here at Last... Bee Gees... Live (1977)	Saturday Night Fever (1977)	Spirits Having Flown (1979)

Singles from Saturday Night Fever
- 1. "How Deep Is Your Love" Released: September 24, 1977; 2. "More Than a Woman" Released: November 19, 1977; 3. "Stayin' Alive" Released: December 15, 1977; 4. "If I Can't Have You" Released: January 1978; 5. "Night Fever" Released: January 1978; 6. "Boogie Shoes" Released: February 1978; 7. "More Than a Woman" Released: April 8, 1978; 8. "Manhattan Skyline" Released: June 17, 1978

The soundtrack was released on November 15, 1977. Prior to the release of Thriller by Michael Jackson, Saturday Night Fever was the best-selling album in music history, and still ranks among the best-selling soundtrack albums worldwide, with sales figures of over 40 million copies.

In the United States, the album was certified 16× Platinum for shipments of at least 16 million units. The album stayed atop the charts for 24 straight weeks from January to July 1978 and stayed on Billboard's album charts for 120 weeks until March 1980. The soundtrack included material written by the Bee Gees: "How Deep Is Your Love", "Stayin' Alive" and "Night Fever", which they also performed, as well as Yvonne Elliman's version of "If I Can't Have You". All four reached No. 1 in the US. In the UK, the album spent 18 consecutive weeks at No. 1. The album epitomized the disco phenomenon on both sides of the Atlantic and was an international sensation. The album has been added to the National Recording Registry in the Library of Congress in 2014 for being culturally significant.

1. "Stayin' Alive" performed by the Bee Gees – 4:45
2. "How Deep Is Your Love" performed by Bee Gees – 4:05
3. "Night Fever" performed by Bee Gees – 3:33
4. "More Than a Woman" performed by Bee Gees – 3:17
5. "If I Can't Have You" performed by Yvonne Elliman – 3:00
6. "A Fifth of Beethoven" performed by Walter Murphy – 3:03
7. "More Than a Woman" performed by Tavares – 3:17
8. "Manhattan Skyline" performed by David Shire – 4:44
9. "Calypso Breakdown" performed by Ralph MacDonald – 7:50
10. "Night on Disco Mountain" performed by David Shire – 5:12
11. "Open Sesame" performed by Kool & the Gang – 4:01
12. "Jive Talkin'" performed by Bee Gees – 3:43 (*)
13. "You Should Be Dancing" performed by Bee Gees – 4:14
14. "Boogie Shoes" performed by KC and the Sunshine Band – 2:17
15. "Salsation" performed by David Shire – 3:50
16. "K-Jee" performed by MFSB – 4:13
17. "Disco Inferno" performed by The Trammps – 10:51

With the exception of (*) track 12 "Jive Talkin", all of the songs are played in the film.
The novelty songs "Dr. Disco" and "Disco Duck", both performed by Rick Dees, are played in the film but not included on the album.

According to the DVD commentary for Saturday Night Fever, the producers intended to use the song "Lowdown" by Boz Scaggs in the rehearsal scene between Tony and Annette in the dance studio, and choreographed their dance moves to the song. However, representatives for Scaggs' label Columbia Records refused to grant legal clearance for it, as they wanted to pursue another disco movie project, which never materialized. Composer David Shire, who scored the film, had to write a song to match the dance steps in the scene, replacing the Scaggs track. However, Shire's track does not appear on the movie's soundtrack.

The song "K-Jee" was used during the dance contest with the Puerto Rican couple that competed against Tony and Stephanie. Some VHS cassettes used a more traditional Latin-style song instead. The DVD restores the original recording.

== Release ==
=== Theatrical ===
Movie poster of the PG version of Saturday Night Fever

Two theatrical versions of the film were released: the original R-rated version and an edited PG-rated version in 1979.

The R-rated version released in 1977 represented the movie's first run, and totaled 119 minutes. After the success of the first run, the film's content was re-edited into a 112-minute, toned down, PG-rated version, not only to attract a wider audience, but also to capitalize on attracting the target audience of the teenagers who were not old enough to see the film by themselves, but who made the film's soundtrack album a monster hit. The R-rated version's profanity, nudity, fight sequence, and a gang rape scene in a car, were all de-emphasized or removed from the PG version. Numerous profanity-filled scenes were replaced with alternate takes of the same scenes, substituting milder language initially intended for the network television cut.

Paramount initially intended to release the PG-rated version of the film in 1978, as it was already being screened on airlines. However, due to the regulations set by the MPAA at the time, it was not permissible to have two versions of a film with different ratings shown concurrently in American theaters. Consequently, Paramount had to remove the film from exhibition for a period of 90 days before they could showcase the alternate rated version, thereby causing a delay in their release plans. Eventually, in 1979, the PG-rated version was made available to the public. Paramount later decided to present it as a double feature along with their other successful John Travolta film, Grease. In the Biography documentary Inside Story: Saturday Night Fever, producer Robert Stigwood criticized the PG-rated version, stating that it undermined the film's impact and lacked the power of the original R-rated edition.

In 2017, the director's cut (running 122 minutes) premiered at the TCM Classic Film Festival at TCL Chinese Theatre in Hollywood. Fathom Events hosted special screenings of this version in 2017.

=== Home media ===
Both theatrical versions were released on VHS. The PG-rated version never had a home video release on LaserDisc. It was first released to DVD by Paramount on October 8, 2002, as an R-rated special-edition, which included most of the deleted scenes present on the PG version, as well as a director's commentary and "Behind the Music" featurettes.

On May 5, 2009, Paramount released Saturday Night Fever on Blu-ray Disc in 1.78:1 aspect ratio. This release retains the R-rated version of the film, and included bonus features from the 2002 release as well as new extras.

The 4K director's cut (122 minutes) was released on Blu-ray on May 2, 2017. This disc includes both the director's cut and the original theatrical version, as well as the bulk of the bonus features from the prior release. The 4K version presents the film at its original 1.85:1 aspect ratio.

On November 8, 2022, Paramount released the film as a special edition 4K HD Blu-ray.

=== Television broadcast ===
When HBO acquired the pay television rights to Saturday Night Fever in 1980, both versions of the film were aired by the network: the PG version during the day, and the R version during the evening (HBO, which had primarily operated on a late afternoon-to-early overnight schedule at the time, had maintained a programming policy restricting the showing of R-rated films to the nighttime hours, a rule that continued long after it switched to a 24-hour schedule full-time in December 1981). The R-rated theatrical version premiered on the network at midnight Eastern Time on January 1, 1980.

For the film's network television premiere, airing on ABC on November 16, 1980, a new milder version was created to conform with network broadcast standards. The network television version was a slightly shortened cut of the PG-rated version. In order to maintain runtime, a few additional scenes deleted from both theatrical releases were added to make up for the lost/cut material, making the ABC version among the longest cuts of the film. These added scenes included Tony dancing with Doreen to "Disco Duck", Tony running his finger along the cables of the Verrazzano–Narrows Bridge, and Tony's father getting his job back. The last two deleted scenes were included in the 2017 director's cut.

Starting in the late 1990s, VH1, TBS and TNT began showing the original R-rated version with a TV-14 rating, although with nudity removed/censored, and the stronger profanity either being edited or (on recent airings) silenced. However, this version of the TV cut included some innuendo included in the original theatrical release that was edited or removed from the PG version. Turner Classic Movies has aired the film in both versions: the original R-rated version (rated TV-MA on the network) is the cut commonly broadcast, although the PG cut has been presented as part of TCM's family-oriented "Funday Night at the Movies" and "Essentials Jr." film showcases.

== Reception ==
=== Box office ===
The film grossed $25.9 million in its first 24 days of release and grossed an average of $600,000 a day throughout January to March going on to gross $94.2 million in the United States and Canada and $237.1 million worldwide. Adjusted for inflation, it is the highest-grossing R-rated film released in the U.S. in the 1970s, with a total box office gross of $673,899,098 in 2024.

=== Critical response ===
Saturday Night Fever received positive reviews and is regarded by many critics as one of the best films of 1977.

On the review aggregator website Rotten Tomatoes, 82% of 55 critics' reviews are positive, with an average rating of 7.5/10. The website's consensus reads: "Boasting a smart, poignant story, a classic soundtrack, and a starmaking performance from John Travolta, Saturday Night Fever ranks among the finest dramas of the 1970s."

Metacritic, which uses a weighted average, assigned the film a score of 77 out of 100, based on 7 critics, indicating "generally favorable" reviews.

Film critic Gene Siskel, who would later list this as his favorite movie, praised the film: "One minute into Saturday Night Fever you know this picture is onto something, that it knows what it's talking about." He also praised John Travolta's energetic performance: "Travolta on the dance floor is like a peacock on amphetamines. He struts like crazy." Siskel even bought Travolta's famous white suit from the film at a charity auction.

Film critic Pauline Kael wrote a gushing review of the film in The New Yorker: "The way Saturday Night Fever has been directed and shot, we feel the languorous pull of the discotheque, and the gaudiness is transformed. These are among the most hypnotically beautiful pop dance scenes ever filmed ... Travolta gets so far inside the role he seems incapable of a false note; even the Brooklyn accent sounds unerring ... At its best, though, Saturday Night Fever gets at something deeply romantic: the need to move, to dance, and the need to be who you'd like to be. Nirvana is the dance; when the music stops, you return to being ordinary."

=== Accolades ===
Award	Category	Nominee(s)	Result	Ref.
Academy Awards	Best Actor	John Travolta	Nominated	
British Academy Film Awards	Anthony Asquith Award for Original Film Music	Bee Gees	Nominated	
British Academy Film Awards	Best Soundtrack	Michael Colgan, Les Lazarowitz, John Wilkinson, Robert W. Glass Jr., and John T. Reitz	Nominated	
DVD Exclusive Awards	Best Audio Commentary, Library Release	John Badham (for the 25th Anniversary Edition)	Nominated	
Golden Globe Awards	Best Motion Picture – Musical or Comedy		Nominated	
Golden Globe Awards	Best Actor in a Motion Picture – Musical or Comedy	John Travolta	Nominated	
Golden Globe Awards	Best Original Score – Motion Picture	Barry Gibb, Maurice Gibb, Robin Gibb, and David Shire	Nominated	
Golden Globe Awards	Best Original Song – Motion Picture	"How Deep Is Your Love"; Music and Lyrics by Barry Gibb, Maurice Gibb, and Robin Gibb	Nominated	
Golden Screen Awards			Won	
Grammy Awards (1977)	Best Pop Vocal Performance by a Group	"How Deep Is Your Love" – Bee Gees	Won	
Grammy Awards (1977)	Producer of the Year	Barry Gibb, Maurice Gibb, Robin Gibb, Albhy Galuten, and Karl Richardson	Nominated	
Grammy Awards (1978)	Album of the Year	Saturday Night Fever – Bee Gees, Broadway Eddie, Richard Finch, Albhy Galuten, K.G. Productions, Ron Kersey, Arif Mardin, Bobby Martin, Bill Oakes, Freddie Perren, Karl Richardson, William Salter, Thomas J. Valentino, Ralph MacDonald, David Shire, Don Renaldo, Yvonne Elliman, K.C. and the Sunshine Band, Kool & the Gang, Walter Murphy, Tavares, and Trammps	Won	
Grammy Awards (1978)	Record of the Year	"Stayin' Alive" – Barry Gibb, Maurice Gibb, Robin Gibb, Albhy Galuten, and Karl Richardson	Nominated	
Grammy Awards (1978)	Song of the Year	"Stayin' Alive" – Barry Gibb, Maurice Gibb, and Robin Gibb	Nominated	
Grammy Awards (1978)	Best Pop Vocal Performance by a Duo, Group or Chorus	Saturday Night Fever – Bee Gees	Won	
Grammy Awards (1978)	Best Arrangement for Voices	"Stayin' Alive" – Bee Gees	Won	
Grammy Awards (1978)	Producer of the Year	Barry Gibb, Maurice Gibb, Robin Gibb, Albhy Galuten, and Karl Richardson	Won	
Grammy Awards (2004)	Grammy Hall of Fame	Saturday Night Fever – Various Artists	Inducted	
National Board of Review Awards	Top Ten Films		7th Place	
National Board of Review Awards	Best Actor	John Travolta	Won	
National Film Preservation Board	National Film Registry		Inducted	
National Society of Film Critics Awards	Best Actor	John Travolta	3rd Place	
New York Film Critics Circle Awards	Best Actor	John Travolta	Runner-up	
New York Film Critics Circle Awards	Best Supporting Actress	Donna Pescow	Runner-up	
Writers Guild of America Awards	Best Drama – Written Directly for the Screen	Norman Wexler	Nominated	

American Film Institute Lists

- AFI's 100 Years ... 100 Songs:
  - "Stayin' Alive" – #9

== Tributes and legacy ==
The film was added to The New York Times "Guide to the Best 1,000 Movies Ever Made", which was published in 2004. In 2010, it was selected for preservation in the United States National Film Registry by the Library of Congress as being "culturally, historically, or aesthetically significant".

Michael Hann of The Guardian explained that Saturday Night Fever "codified disco for a huge international audience, both as a style of music and a way of dancing."

In 2025, Kaves, an artist from Bay Ridge, Brooklyn, who was influenced by the film, donated a plaque dedicated to Travolta, Gorney, the characters they portrayed, and "all the Brooklyn dreamers." The plaque was installed on a bench along the Bay Ridge Promenade, where the scene in which Tony shows his softer side to Stephanie was filmed.

== In popular culture ==
A television show based on the film was in development, at some point after the film's release. In 2024, David Letterman said that he was sent to an audition for the series.

The 1980 comedy Airplane! by directors David & Jerry Zucker and Jim Abrahams, included a flashback scene that directly parodied the dance competition scene at the disco in Saturday Night Fever.

In 2008, director Pablo Larraín made a film, Tony Manero, about a Chilean dancer obsessed by the main character in Saturday Night Fever who tries to win a Tony Manero look-alike contest.

On April 17, 2012, Fox aired series Glee's episode 16, "Saturday Night Glee-ver", which pays tribute to the film and features various songs from its soundtrack (especially the songs performed by the Bee Gees), covered by the series' cast.

The Red Hot Chili Peppers 2016 music video for their song "Go Robot" is heavily inspired by the film and recreates the opening scene and classic characters from the film who are portrayed by each band member.

The 2018 film Ready Player One features a dance scene that references Saturday Night Fever, particularly the red, yellow, and blue dance floor from the 2001 Odyssey night club in the film.

In November 2023, Capital One began airing a holiday-themed commercial titled "Holiday Night Fever" which contained an homage to the opening scene of the movie.

== See also ==
Other films released during the late 1970s disco and jukebox musical craze

- Thank God It's Friday (1978)
- Sgt. Pepper's Lonely Hearts Club Band (1978)
- Roller Boogie (1979)
- Skatetown, U.S.A. (1979)
- The Apple (1980)
- Xanadu (1980)
- Can't Stop the Music (1980)
- Fame (1980)
- Get Rollin' (1980), roller disco documentary
