= Tribal Rites of the New Saturday Night =

1976 magazine article by Nik Cohn

- Short story by Nik Cohn
- Country: United States
- Language: English
- Genre: Fiction

Publication
- Publisher: New York
- Publication date: June 7, 1976

"Tribal Rites of the New Saturday Night" is the title of a 1976 New York article by British rock journalist Nik Cohn, which formed the basis for the plot and inspired the characters for the 1977 movie Saturday Night Fever.

Originally, the article was published as a piece of factual reporting. However, around the time of the 20th anniversary of the article in 1996, Cohn revealed that it was actually a work of fiction.

After persuading New York editor Clay Felker to let him write an article about the 1970s disco scene, Cohn, a newcomer to the United States, set about researching the American working-class subculture he was trying to cover. One night he travelled to Bay Ridge, Brooklyn, to visit the disco 2001 Odyssey. However, when he arrived a drunken fight was taking place outside the club, and one of the participants rolled over in the gutter and threw up on Cohn's trouser leg, leading him to return to Manhattan. Despite this brief visit, Cohn did notice that the scene was surveyed by one clubgoer standing in the doorway and calmly watching events. Cohn returned to the club subsequently but the young man was not there.

To overcome his lack of familiarity with the New York disco scene, Cohn combined the image of the figure outside the club with people he knew from his youth, including a gang member from the Northern Ireland city of Derry, where Cohn had grown up, and a young man he knew in England. "My story was a fraud", he wrote. "I'd only recently arrived in New York. Far from being steeped in Brooklyn street life, I hardly knew the place. As for Vincent, my story's hero, he was largely inspired by a Shepherd's Bush mod whom I'd known in the Sixties, a one-time king of Goldhawk Road." For additional detail Cohn returned to Bay Ridge during the day to get a better feel for the area.

On the 40th anniversary of the article’s publication in 2016, Cohn said that he thought that such a fictionalised piece would not be published in the contemporary press:

It reads to me as obvious fiction, albeit based on observation and some knowledge of disco culture. No way could it sneak past customs now. In the 60s and 70s, the line between fact and fiction was blurry... Few editors asked tough questions. For the most part it was a case of "don't ask, don't tell".

Despite the story's questionable provenance, its impact on popular culture has been significant. As the writer Mark Rozzo pointed out in a 2011 profile of Cohn for the New York Times:

Without Cohn’s original story, it’s possible that disco would be a dimly remembered fad from the days of the Ford administration: no Bee Gees megahits, no Travolta superstardom, no nostalgic polyester parties for decades ever after. Barry Gibb reportedly once said to Cohn, “It’s all your bloody fault, isn’t it?” He may have been right.
