= 1977 National Society of Film Critics Awards =

Annual US film award ceremony

12th NSFC Awards

December 19, 1977

Best Film:
Annie Hall

The 12th National Society of Film Critics Awards, given on 19 December 1977, honored the best filmmaking of 1977.

== Winners ==
=== Best Picture ===
1. Annie Hall
2. That Obscure Object of Desire (Cet obscur objet du désir)
3. Close Encounters of the Third Kind

=== Best Director ===
1. Luis Buñuel – That Obscure Object of Desire (Cet obscur objet du désir)
2. Steven Spielberg – Close Encounters of the Third Kind
3. Woody Allen – Annie Hall

=== Best Actor ===
1. Art Carney – The Late Show
2. John Gielgud – Providence
3. Fernando Rey – That Obscure Object of Desire (Cet obscur objet du désir)
3. John Travolta – Saturday Night Fever

=== Best Actress ===
1. Diane Keaton – Annie Hall
2. Shelley Duvall – 3 Women
3. Jane Fonda – Julia

=== Best Supporting Actor ===
1. Edward Fox – A Bridge Too Far
2. Bill Macy – The Late Show
3. David Hemmings – Islands in the Stream
3. Maximilian Schell – Julia

=== Best Supporting Actress ===
1. Ann Wedgeworth – Handle with Care
2. Marcia Rodd – Handle with Care
3. Sissy Spacek – 3 Women

=== Best Screenplay ===
- Woody Allen and Marshall Brickman– Annie Hall

=== Best Cinematography ===
- Thomas Mauch – Aguirre, the Wrath of God (Aguirre, der Zorn Gottes)
