= 1977 New York Film Critics Circle Awards =

43rd New York Film Critics Circle Awards

43rd New York Film Critics Circle Awards

January 29, 1978
(announced December 21, 1977)

Best Picture:
Annie Hall

The 43rd New York Film Critics Circle Awards, 29 January 1978, honored the best filmmaking of 1977.

== Winners ==
- Best Actor:
  - John Gielgud - Providence
  - Runners-up: Fernando Rey - That Obscure Object of Desire (Cet obscur objet du désir) and John Travolta - Saturday Night Fever
- Best Actress:
  - Diane Keaton - Annie Hall
  - Runners-up: Shelley Duvall - 3 Women and Diane Keaton - Looking for Mr. Goodbar
- Best Director:
  - Woody Allen - Annie Hall
  - Runners-up: Luis Buñuel - That Obscure Object of Desire (Cet obscur objet du désir) and Steven Spielberg - Close Encounters of the Third Kind
- Best Film:
  - Annie Hall
  - Runners-up: That Obscure Object of Desire (Cet obscur objet du désir) and Close Encounters of the Third Kind
- Best Screenplay:
  - Woody Allen and Marshall Brickman - Annie Hall
  - Runner-up: Luis Buñuel and Jean-Claude Carrière - That Obscure Object of Desire (Cet obscur objet du désir)
- Best Supporting Actor:
  - Maximilian Schell - Julia
  - Runners-up: Bill Macy - The Late Show and David Hemmings - Islands in the Stream
- Best Supporting Actress:
  - Sissy Spacek - 3 Women
  - Runners-up: Vanessa Redgrave - Julia and Donna Pescow - Saturday Night Fever
