= Lillian Hellman =

American dramatist and screenwriter (1905–1984)

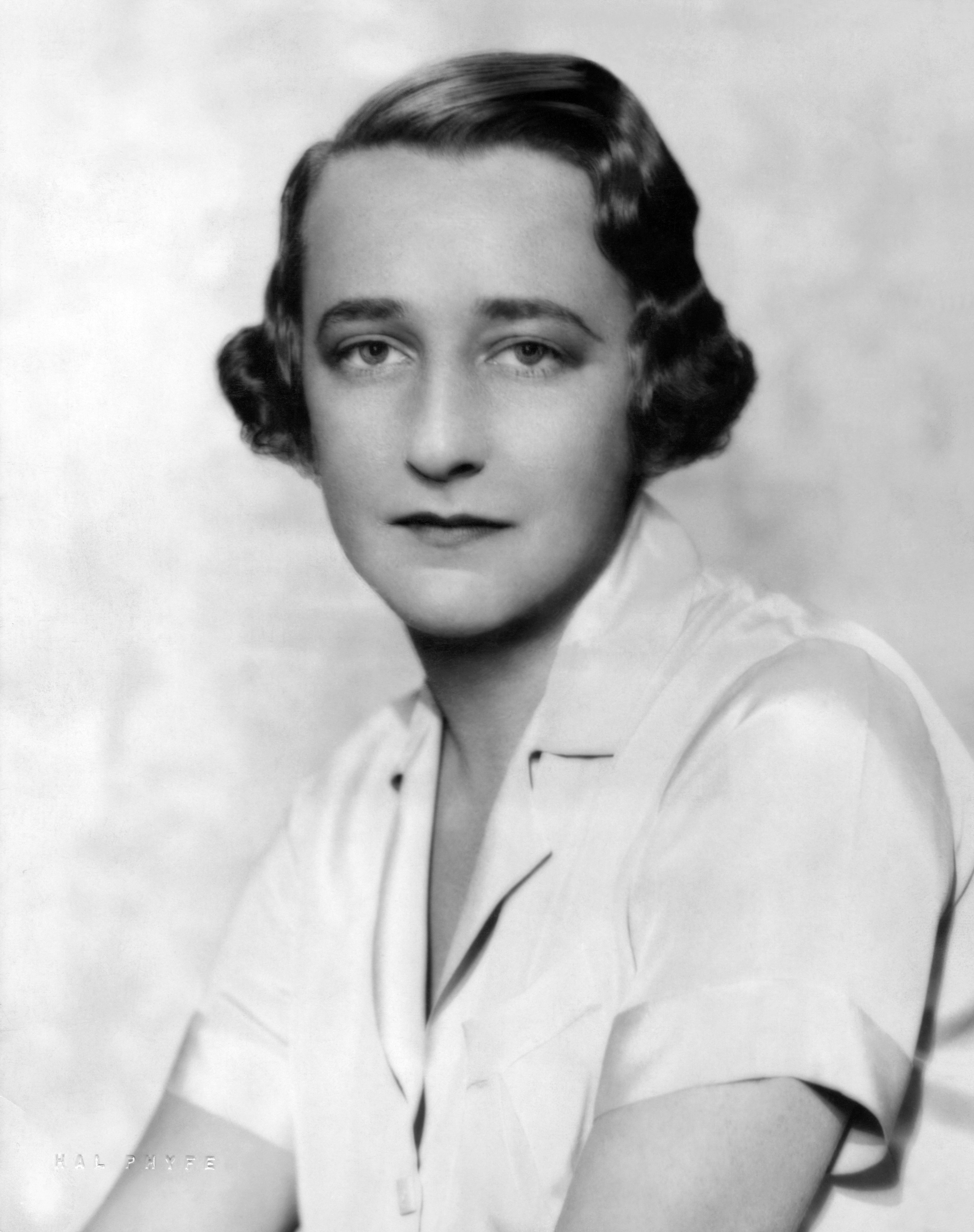
- Hellman in 1935
- Born: Lillian Florence Hellman; June 20, 1905; New Orleans, Louisiana, U.S.
- Died: June 30, 1984 (aged 79); Oak Bluffs, Massachusetts, U.S.
- Resting place: Abels Hill Chilmark cemetery, Chilmark, Martha's Vineyard
- Occupations: Playwright; author; screenwriter
- Spouse: Arthur Kober (m. 1925; div. 1932)
- Partner: Dashiell Hammett (1931–1961; Hammett's death)

Lillian Florence Hellman (June 20, 1905 – June 30, 1984) was an American playwright, prose writer, memoirist, and screenwriter known for her success on Broadway as well as her communist views and political activism. She was blacklisted after her appearance before the House Committee on Un-American Activities (HUAC) at the height of the anti-communist campaigns of 1947–1952. Although she continued to work on Broadway in the 1950s, her blacklisting by the U.S. film industry caused a drop in her income. Many praised Hellman for refusing to answer HUAC's questions, but others believed, despite her denial, that she had belonged to the Communist Party.

As a playwright, Hellman had many successes on Broadway, including The Children's Hour, The Little Foxes and its sequel Another Part of the Forest, Watch on the Rhine, The Autumn Garden, and Toys in the Attic. She adapted her semi-autobiographical play The Little Foxes into a screenplay; the movie starred Bette Davis. Hellman was romantically involved with fellow writer and political activist Dashiell Hammett, who also was blacklisted for 10 years.

Beginning in the late 1960s, and continuing to her death, Hellman wrote a series of memoirs of her colorful life and acquaintances. Her accuracy was challenged in 1979 on The Dick Cavett Show, when Mary McCarthy said of Hellman's memoirs that "every word she writes is a lie, including 'and' and 'the'." Hellman sued McCarthy and Cavett for defamation, and during the suit, investigators found errors in Hellman's Pentimento. They said that its "Julia" section, which was the basis for the Oscar-winning 1977 movie of the same name, was actually based on the life of Muriel Gardiner. Martha Gellhorn, one of the most prominent war correspondents of the 20th century and Ernest Hemingway's third wife, said that Hellman's memories of Hemingway and the Spanish Civil War were inaccurate. McCarthy, Gellhorn, and others accused Hellman of lying about her membership in the Communist Party and of being a committed Stalinist.

The defamation suit was unresolved at the time of Hellman's death in 1984; her executors eventually withdrew the complaint.

== Biography ==
=== Early life and marriage ===
Lillian Florence Hellman was born in New Orleans, Louisiana, into a Jewish family. Her mother was Julia Newhouse of Demopolis, Alabama, and her father was Max Hellman, a New Orleans shoe salesman. Julia Newhouse's parents were Sophie Marx, from a successful banking family, and Leonard Newhouse, a Demopolis liquor dealer. During most of her childhood she spent half of each year in a New Orleans boarding home run by her aunts and the other half in New York City. She studied for two years at New York University and then took several courses at Columbia University.

On December 31, 1925, Hellman married Arthur Kober, a playwright and press agent, although they often lived apart. In 1929, she traveled around Europe for a time and settled in Bonn to continue her education. She felt an initial attraction to a Nazi student group that advocated "a kind of socialism" until their questioning of her Jewish ties made their antisemitism clear, and she returned immediately to the United States. Years later she wrote, "Then for the first time in my life I thought about being a Jew."

=== 1930s ===
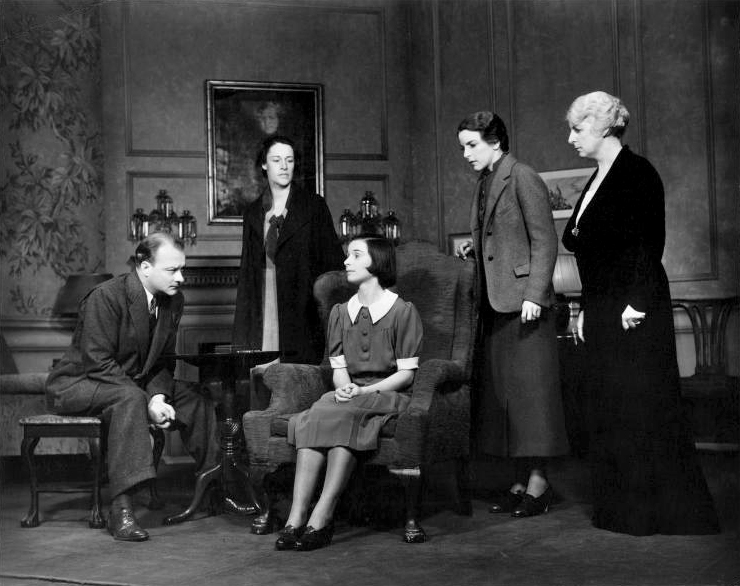
Robert Keith, Anne Revere, Florence McGee, Katherine Emery and Katherine Emmet in the original Broadway production of The Children's Hour (1934)

Beginning in 1930, for about a year Hellman earned $50 a week as a reader for Metro-Goldwyn-Mayer in Hollywood, writing summaries of novels and periodical literature for potential screenplays. She found the job rather dull, but it created opportunities for her to meet a wide range of creative people while she became involved in more political and artistic scenes. While there, she met and fell in love with mystery writer Dashiell Hammett. She divorced Kober and returned to New York City in 1932. When she met Hammett in a Hollywood restaurant, she was 24 and he was 36. They maintained their relationship off and on until his death in 1961.

Hellman's drama The Children's Hour premiered on Broadway on November 24, 1934, and ran for 691 performances. It depicts a schoolgirl's false accusation of lesbianism against two of her teachers. The falsehood is discovered, but before amends can be made one teacher is rejected by her fiancé and the other dies by suicide. After the success of The Children's Hour, Hellman returned to Hollywood as a screenwriter for Goldwyn Pictures at $2,500 a week. She first collaborated on a screenplay for The Dark Angel, an earlier play and silent film. After that film's successful release in 1935, Goldwyn purchased the rights to The Children's Hour for $35,000 while it still was running on Broadway. Hellman rewrote the play to conform to the standards of the Motion Picture Production Code, under which any mention of lesbianism was impossible. Instead, one schoolteacher is accused of having sex with the other's fiancé. It appeared in 1936 under the title These Three. She next wrote the screenplay for Dead End, which featured the first appearance of the Dead End Kids and premiered in 1937.

On May 1, 1935, Hellman joined the League of American Writers, whose members included Hammett, Alexander Trachtenberg of International Publishers, Frank Folsom, Louis Untermeyer, I. F. Stone, Myra Page, Millen Brand, and Arthur Miller. Members were largely either Communist Party members or fellow travelers.

Also in 1935, Hellman joined the struggling Screen Writers Guild, devoted herself to recruiting new members, and proved one of its most aggressive advocates. One of its key issues was the dictatorial way producers credited writers for their work, known as "screen credit". Hellman had received no recognition for some of her earlier projects, including her work as the principal author of The Westerner (1934) and a principal contributor to The Melody Lingers On (1935).

In December 1936, her play Days to Come closed its Broadway run after just seven performances. The play depicts a labor dispute in a small Ohio town during which the characters try to balance the competing claims of owners and workers, both represented as valid. Communist publications denounced her failure to take sides. That same month she joined several other literary figures, including Dorothy Parker and Archibald MacLeish, in forming and funding Contemporary Historians, Inc., to back a film project, The Spanish Earth, to demonstrate support for the anti-Franco forces in the Spanish Civil War.

In March 1937, Hellman and 87 other U.S. public figures signed "An Open Letter to American Liberals", which protested an effort headed by John Dewey to examine Leon Trotsky's defense against his 1936 condemnation by the Soviet Union. Some critics view the letter as a defense of Stalin's Moscow Purge Trials. It charged some of Trotsky's defenders with aiming to destabilize the Soviet Union and said the Soviet Union "should be left to protect itself against treasonable plots as it saw fit." It asked U.S. liberals and progressives to unite with the Soviet Union against the growing threat of fascism and avoid an investigation that would only fuel "the reactionary sections of the press and public" in the U.S. Endorsing this view, the editors of the New Republic wrote, "there are more important questions than Trotsky's guilt." Those who signed the Open Letter called for a united front against fascism, which, in their view, required uncritical support of the Soviet Union.

In October 1937, Hellman spent a few weeks in Spain to lend her support, as other writers had, to the International Brigades of non-Spaniards who had joined the anti-Franco side in the Spanish Civil War. As bombs fell on Madrid, she broadcast a report to the U.S. on Madrid Radio. In 1989, journalist and Ernest Hemingway's third wife, Martha Gellhorn, herself in Spain at that period, disputed the account of this trip in Hellman's memoirs and claimed that Hellman waited until all the witnesses were dead before describing events that never occurred. But Hellman had documented her trip in the New Republic in April 1938 as "A Day in Spain". Langston Hughes wrote admiringly of the radio broadcast in 1956.

Hellman was a member of the Communist Party from 1938 to 1940. By her own account, written in 1952, she was "a most casual member. I attended very few meetings and saw and heard nothing more than people sitting around a room talking of current events or discussing the books they had read. I drifted away from the Communist Party because I seemed to be in the wrong place. My own maverick nature was no more suitable to the political left than it had been to the conservative background from which I came."

==== The Little Foxes and controversy ====
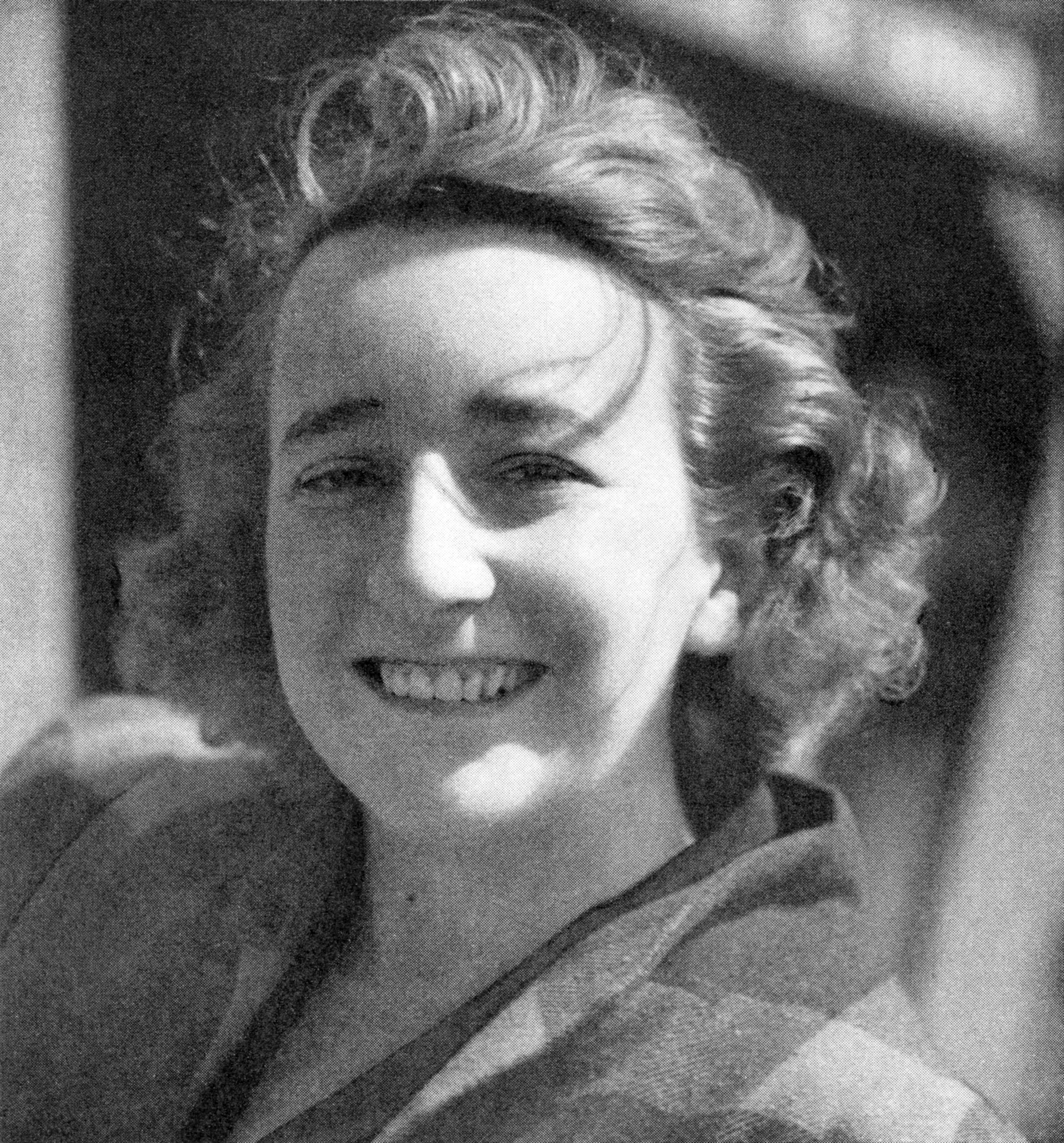
Hellman in 1939

The Little Foxes opened on Broadway on February 13, 1939, and ran for 410 performances. The play starred Tallulah Bankhead as Regina, and after its success on Broadway, it toured extensively in the U.S. It was Hellman's favorite of her plays, and by far the most commercially and critically successful. But a feud developed between Bankhead and Hellman when Bankhead wanted to perform for a benefit for Finnish Relief, as the USSR had recently invaded Finland. Without thinking Hellman's approval was necessary, Bankhead and the cast told the press the news of the benefit. They were shocked when Hellman and Shumlin declined to give permission for the benefit performance, citing non-intervention and anti-militarism. Bankhead told reporters, "I've adopted Spanish Loyalist orphans and sent money to China, causes for which both Mr. Shumlin and Miss Hellman were strenuous proponents ... why should [they] suddenly become so insular?"

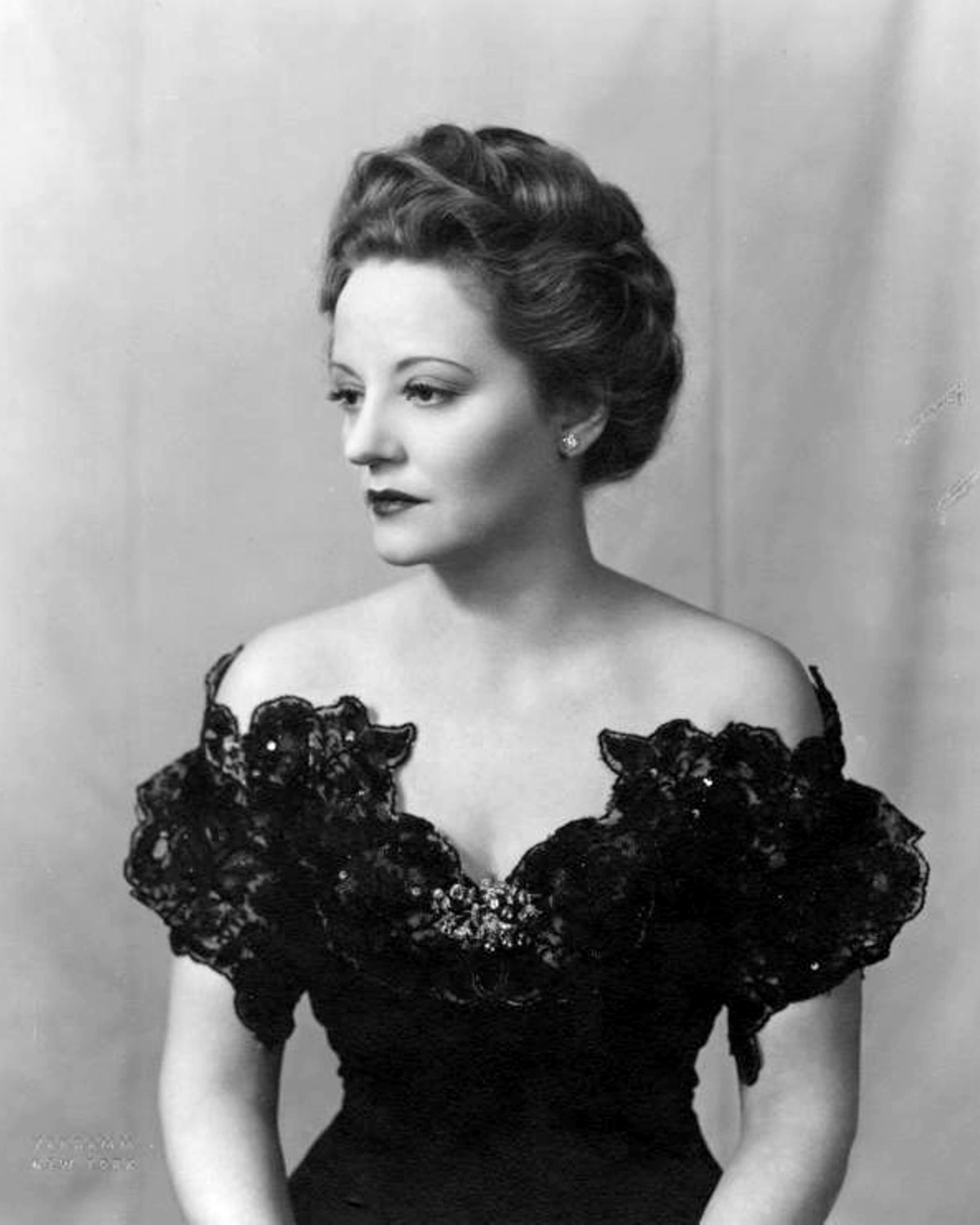
Tallulah Bankhead as Regina Giddens in The Little Foxes (1939)

Hellman countered: "I don't believe in that fine, lovable little Republic of Finland that everyone gets so weepy about. I've been there and it seems like a little pro-Nazi Republic to me." Bankhead, who hated Nazism and had become a strong critic of Communism since the mid 1930s Great Purge and for what she saw as a communist betrayal of the Second Spanish Republic, was outraged by Hellman's actions and thought her a moral hypocrite. Hellman had never been to Finland. Bankhead and the cast suspected that Hellman's refusal was motivated by her devotion to the Stalinist regime in Soviet Russia. Hellman and Bankhead became adversaries as a result of the feud, not speaking to each other for a quarter of a century afterward.

Hellman aggravated the matter by saying that her real reason for turning down the benefit was that when the Spanish Republican government fell to Franco's fascists, Hellman and Shumlin requested that Bankhead put on a benefit for the Spanish loyalists fleeing to neighboring France, and Bankhead refused. Bankhead was incensed by this, as she had helped many Spanish Republican fighters and families flee the Spanish Civil War in 1937 after they had been turned on by Stalinist fighters behind their own Republican lines. Hellman and Bankhead did not speak again until 1963. Years later, drama critic Joseph Wood Krutch recounted how he and fellow critic George Jean Nathan had shared a cab with Hellman and Bankhead:

Bankhead said: "That's the last time I act in one of your god-damned plays". Miss Hellman responded by slamming her purse against the actress's jaw. ... I decided that no self-respecting Gila monster would have behaved in that manner.

=== 1940s ===
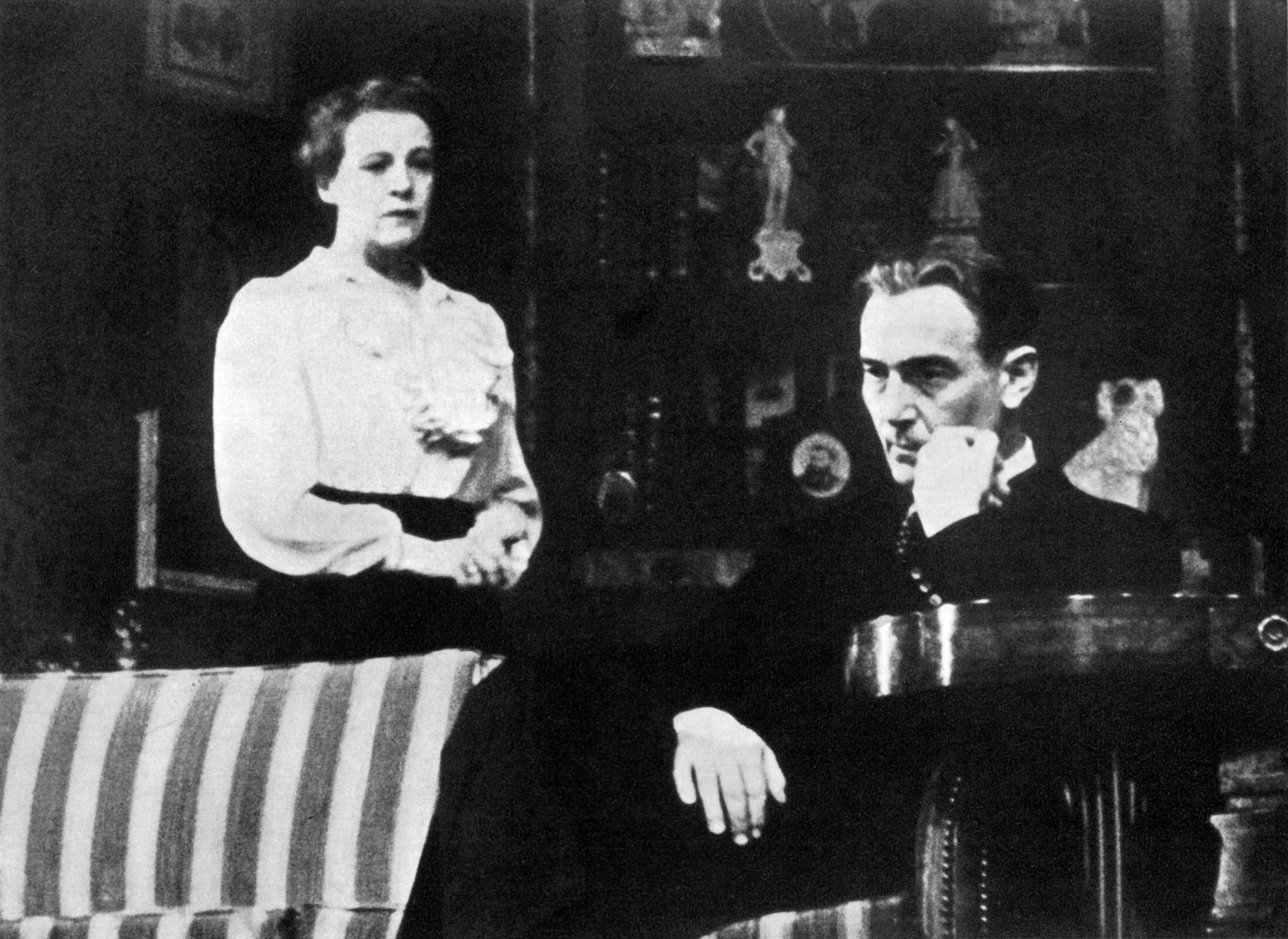
Mady Christians and Paul Lukas in the original Broadway production of Watch on the Rhine (1941)

On January 9, 1940, viewing the spread of fascism in Europe and fearing similar political developments in the U.S., Hellman said at a luncheon of the American Booksellers Association:

I am a writer and I am also a Jew. I want to be quite sure that I can continue to be a writer and if I want to say that greed is bad or persecution is worse, I can do so without being branded by the malice of people who make a living by that malice. I also want to be able to go on saying that I am a Jew without being afraid of being called names or end in a prison camp or be forbidden to walk the street at night.

Her play Watch on the Rhine opened on Broadway on April 1, 1941, and ran for 378 performances. It won the New York Drama Critics' Circle Award. She wrote it in 1940, when its call for a united international alliance against Hitler contradicted the Communist position at the time, following the Nazi-Soviet Non-Aggression Pact of August 1939. Early in 1942, Hellman accompanied the production to Washington, D.C., for a benefit performance, where she spoke with President Franklin D. Roosevelt. Hammett wrote the screenplay for the movie version, which appeared in 1943.

In October 1941, Hellman and Ernest Hemingway co-hosted a dinner to raise money for anti-Nazi activists imprisoned in France. New York Governor Herbert Lehman agreed to participate, but withdrew because some of the sponsoring organizations, he wrote, "have long been connected with Communist activities." Hellman replied: "I do not and I did not ask the politics of any members of the committee and there is nobody who can with honesty vouch for anybody but themselves." She assured him the funds raised would be used as promised and later provided him with a detailed accounting. The next month, she wrote him: "I am sure it will make you sad and ashamed as it did me to know that, of the seven resignations out of 147 sponsors, five were Jews. Of all the peoples in the world, I think, we should be the last to hold back help, on any grounds, from those who fought for us."

In 1942, Hellman was nominated for an Academy Award for her screenplay for The Little Foxes. Two years later, she was nominated for her screenplay for The North Star, the only original screenplay of her career. She objected to the film's production numbers that, she said, turned a village festival into "an extended opera bouffe peopled by musical comedy characters", but told The New York Times that it was still "a valuable and true picture which tells a good deal of the truth about fascism". To establish the difference between her screenplay and the film, Hellman published her screenplay in the fall of 1943. British anti-Communist writer Robert Conquest wrote that it was "a travesty greater than could have been shown on Soviet screens to audiences used to lies, but experienced in collective-farm conditions."

In April 1944, Hellman's The Searching Wind opened on Broadway. Her third World War II project, it tells the story of an ambassador whose indecisive relations with his wife and mistress mirror the vacillation and appeasement of his professional life. She wrote the screenplay for the film version that appeared two years later. Both versions depict the ambassador's feckless response to antisemitism. The conservative press noted that the play reflected none of Hellman's pro-Soviet views, and the communist response to the play was unfavorable.

Hellman's applications for a passport to travel to England in April 1943 and May 1944 were both denied because government authorities considered her "an active Communist", although in 1944 the head of the Passport Division of the Department of State, Ruth Shipley, cited "the present military situation" as the reason. In August 1944, Hellman received a passport, indicative of government approval, for travel to Russia on a goodwill mission as a guest of VOKS, the Soviet agency that handled cultural exchanges. During her visit from November 5, 1944, to January 18, 1945, she began an affair with John F. Melby, a foreign service officer, that continued intermittently for years and as a friendship for the rest of her life.

In May 1946, the National Institute of Arts and Letters made Hellman a member. In November of that year, her play Another Part of the Forest premiered, directed by Hellman. It presented the same characters 20 years younger than they are in The Little Foxes. A film version to which Hellman did not contribute followed in 1948.

In 1947, Columbia Pictures offered Hellman a multi-year contract, which she refused because it included a clause that she viewed as an infringement on her rights of free speech and association: it required her to sign a statement that she had never been a member of the Communist Party and would not associate with radicals or subversives, which would have required her to end her relationship with Hammett. Shortly thereafter, William Wyler told her he was unable to hire her to work on a film because she was blacklisted.

In November 1947, the leaders of the motion picture industry decided to deny employment to anyone who refused to answer questions posed by the House Un-American Activities Committee. After the Hollywood Ten defied the committee, Hellman wrote an editorial in the December issue of Screen Writer, the publication of the Screen Writers Guild. Titled "The Judas Goats", it mocked the committee and derided producers for allowing themselves to be intimidated. It said in part:

It was a week of turning the head in shame; of the horror of seeing politicians make the honorable institution of Congress into a honky tonk show; of listening to craven men lie and tattle, pushing each other in their efforts to lick the boots of their vilifiers; publicly trying to wreck the lives, not of strangers, mind you, but of men with whom they have worked and eaten and played, and made millions.

But why this particular industry, these particular people? Has it anything to do with Communism? Of course not. There has never been a single line or word of Communism in any American picture at any time. There has never or seldom been ideas of any kind. Naturally, men scared to make pictures about the American Negro, men who only in the last year have allowed the word Jew to be spoken in a picture, men who took more than ten years to make an anti-Fascist picture, those are frightened men and you pick frightened men to frighten first. Judas goats; they'll lead the others, maybe, to the slaughter for you.

They frighten mighty easy, and they talk mighty bad. ... I suggest the rest of us don't frighten so easy. It's still not un-American to fight the enemies of one's country. Let's fight.

Melby and Hellman corresponded regularly in the years after World War II, while he held State Department assignments overseas. Their political views diverged as he came to advocate containment of communism while she was unwilling to accept criticism of the Soviet Union. They became, in one historian's view, "political strangers, occasional lovers, and mostly friends." Melby particularly objected to her support for Henry Wallace in the 1948 presidential election.

In 1949, Hellman adapted Emmanuel Roblès's French-language play, Montserrat, for Broadway, where it opened on October 29, with Hellman directing. It was revived in 1961.

=== 1950s ===
I cannot and will not cut my conscience to fit this year's fashions...

The play recognized by critics and judged by Hellman as her best, The Autumn Garden, premiered in 1951.

In 1952, Hellman was called to testify before the House Un-American Activities Committee (HUAC), which had heard testimony that she had attended Communist Party meetings in 1937. She initially drafted a statement that said her two-year membership in the Communist Party had ended in 1940, but she did not condemn the party or express regret for her participation in it. Her attorney, Joseph Rauh, opposed her admission of membership on technical grounds because she had attended meetings but never formally become a member. He warned that the committee and the public would expect her to take a strong anti-communist stand to atone for her political past, but she refused to apologize or denounce the party. Rauh devised a strategy that produced favorable press coverage and allowed her to avoid the stigma of being labeled a "Fifth Amendment Communist". On May 19, 1952, Hellman wrote HUAC a letter that one historian has described as "written not to persuade the Committee, but to shape press coverage." In it she said she was willing to testify only about herself, and that she did not want to claim her rights under the Fifth Amendment: "I am ready and willing to testify before the representatives of our Government as to my own actions, regardless of any risks or consequences to myself." She wrote that she found the legal requirement that she testify about others if she wanted to speak about her own actions "difficult for a layman to understand". Rauh had the letter delivered to HUAC chairman John S. Wood on May 20.

In public testimony before HUAC on May 21, Hellman answered preliminary questions about her background. When asked about attending a meeting at the home of Hollywood screenwriter Martin Berkeley, she refused to respond, claiming her rights under the Fifth Amendment, and referred the committee to her letter by way of explanation. The committee responded that it had considered and rejected her request to be allowed to testify only about herself and entered her letter into the record. Hellman answered only one additional question: she denied she had ever belonged to the Communist Party. She cited the Fifth Amendment in response to several more questions and the committee dismissed her. Historian John Earl Haynes credits both Rauh's "clever tactics" and Hellman's "sense of the dramatic" for what followed the conclusion of Hellman's testimony. As the committee moved on to other business, Rauh released to the press copies of her letter to HUAC. Committee members, unprepared for close questioning about Hellman's stance, offered only offhand comments. The press reported Hellman's statement at length, its language crafted to overshadow the HUAC members' comments. She wrote in part:

But there is one principle that I do understand. I am not willing, now or in the future, to bring bad trouble to people who, in my past association with them, were completely innocent of any talk or any action that was disloyal or subversive. I do not like subversion or disloyalty in any form and if I had ever seen any I would have considered it my duty to have reported it to the proper authorities. But to hurt innocent people whom I knew many years ago in order to save myself is, to me, inhuman and indecent and dishonorable. I cannot and will not cut my conscience to fit this year's fashions, even though I long ago came to the conclusion that I was not a political person and could have no comfortable place in any political group. I was raised in an old-fashioned American tradition and there were certain homely things that were taught to me: to try to tell the truth, not to bear false witness, not to harm my neighbour, to be loyal to my country, and so on. In general, I respected these ideals of Christian honor and did as well as I knew how. It is my belief that you will agree with these simple rules of human decency and will not expect me to violate the good American tradition from which they spring. I would therefore like to come before you and speak of myself.

Reaction divided along political lines. Murray Kempton, a longtime critic of Hellman's support for communist causes, praised her: "It is enough that she has reached into her conscience for an act based on something more than the material or the tactical ... she has chosen to act like a lady." The FBI increased its surveillance of her travel and her mail. In the early 1950s, at the height of anti-communist fervor in the U.S., the State Department investigated whether Melby posed a security risk. In April 1952, the department made its one formal charge against him: "that during the period 1945 to date, you have maintained an association with one, Lillian Hellman, reliably reported to be a member of the Communist Party", based on testimony by unidentified informants. When Melby appeared before the department's Loyalty Security Board, he was not allowed to contest Hellman's Communist Party affiliation or learn who informed against her, but only to present his understanding of her politics and the nature of his relationship with her, including the occasional renewal of their sexual relationship. He said he had no plans to renew their friendship, but did not promise to avoid contact with her.

In the course of a series of appeals, Hellman testified before the Loyalty Security Board on Melby's behalf. She offered to answer questions about her political views and associations, but the board allowed her only to describe her relationship with Melby. She testified that she had many longstanding friendships with people of different political views and that political sympathy was not part of those relationships. She described how her relationship with Melby changed over time and how their sexual relationship was briefly renewed in 1950 after a long hiatus: "The relationship obviously at this point was neither one thing nor the other: it was neither over nor was it not over." She said:

... to make it black and white would be the lie it never has been, nor do I think many other relations ever are. I don't think it is as much a mystery as perhaps it looks. It has been a ... completely personal relationship of two people who once past being in love also happen to be very devoted to each other and very respectful of one another, and who I think in any other time besides our own would not be open to question of the complete innocence of and the complete morality, if I may say so, of people who were once in love and who have come out with respect and devotion to one another.

The State Department dismissed Melby on April 22, 1953. As was its custom, the board gave no reason for its decision.

In 1954, Hellman declined when asked to adapt Anne Frank's The Diary of a Young Girl (1952) for the stage. According to writer and director Garson Kanin, she said that the diary was "a great historical work which will probably live forever, but I couldn't be more wrong as the adapter. If I did this it would run one night because it would be deeply depressing. You need someone who has a much lighter touch" and recommended her friends Frances Goodrich and Albert Hackett.

Hellman made an English-language adaption of Jean Anouilh's play L'Alouette, based on the trial of Joan of Arc, called The Lark. Leonard Bernstein composed incidental music for the first production, which opened on Broadway on November 17, 1955. Hellman edited a collection of Chekhov's correspondence that appeared in 1955 as The Selected Letters of Anton Chekhov.

After the success of The Lark, Hellman conceived another play with incidental music, based on Voltaire's Candide. Bernstein convinced her to develop it as a comic operetta with a much more substantial musical component. She wrote the dialogue, which many others then worked on, and also wrote some lyrics for what became the often revived Candide. Hellman hated the collaboration and revisions on deadline that Candide required: "I went to pieces when something had to be done quickly, because someone didn't like something, and there was no proper time to think it out ... I realized that I panicked under conditions I wasn't accustomed to."

=== 1960s ===
Toys in the Attic opened on Broadway on February 25, 1960, and ran for 464 performances. It received a Tony Award nomination for Best Play. In this family drama set in New Orleans, money, marital infidelity, and revenge end in a woman's disfigurement. Hellman had no hand in the screenplay, which altered the drama's tone and exaggerated the characterizations, and the resulting film received bad reviews. Later that year she was elected a Fellow of the American Academy of Arts and Sciences.

A second film version of The Children's Hour, less successful both with critics and at the box office, appeared in 1961 under that title, but Hellman played no role in the screenplay, having withdrawn from the project after Hammett died in 1961. But in the 1961 version of The Children's Hour, despite the continued existence of the Motion Picture Production Code, the lead characters (played by Audrey Hepburn and Shirley MacLaine) were explicitly accused of lesbianism.

In 1961, Brandeis University awarded Hellman its Creative Arts Medal for outstanding lifetime achievement and the women's division of the Albert Einstein College of Medicine at Yeshiva University gave her its Achievement Award. In December 1962, Hellman was elected a member of the American Academy of Arts and Letters. She was inducted at a May 1963 ceremony.

Another play, My Mother, My Father, and Me, proved unsuccessful when it was staged in March 1963. It closed after 17 performances. Hellman adapted it from Burt Blechman's novel How Much?

In 1965, Hellman wrote the screenplay for The Chase, starring Marlon Brando, based on a play and novel by Horton Foote. Although she received sole credit for the screenplay, she worked from an earlier treatment, and producer Sam Spiegel made additional changes and altered the sequence of scenes. In 1966, she edited a collection of Hammett's stories, The Big Knockover. Her introductory profile of Hammett was her first exercise in memoir writing.

Hellman wrote a reminiscence of gulag survivor Lev Kopelev, husband of her translator in Russia during 1944, to serve as the introduction to his anti-Stalinist memoir, To Be Preserved Forever, which appeared in 1976. In February 1980, she, John Hersey, and Norman Mailer wrote to Soviet authorities to protest retribution against Kopelev for his defense of Soviet dissident Andrei Sakharov. Hellman was a longtime friend of author Dorothy Parker and served as her literary executor after her death in 1967.

Hellman published her first volume of memoirs, An Unfinished Woman: A Memoir, in 1969. It touches on her political, artistic, and social life, and received the U.S. National Book Award in Arts and Letters, which was an award category from 1964 to 1976.

=== 1970s ===
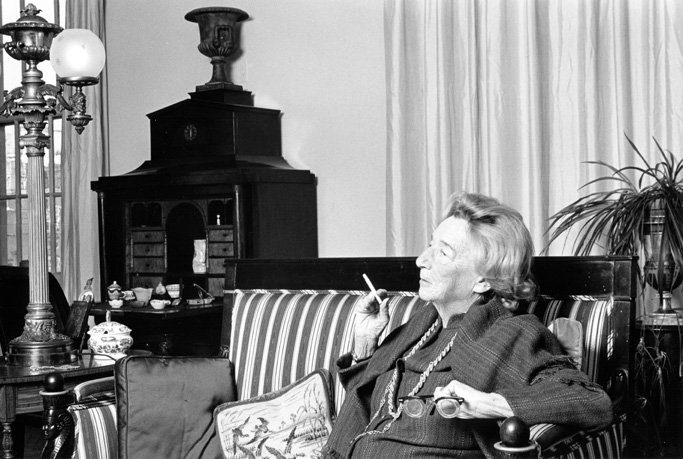
Hellman in her New York City apartment in 1977, portrait by Lynn Gilbert.

In the early 1970s, Hellman taught writing for short periods at the University of California, Berkeley, the Massachusetts Institute of Technology, and Hunter College in New York City. Her second volume of memoirs, Pentimento: A Book of Portraits, appeared in 1973. In an interview at the time, Hellman described the difficulty of writing about the 1950s:

I wasn't as shocked by McCarthy as by all the people who took no stand at all. ... I don't remember one large figure coming to anybody's aid. It's funny. Bitter funny. Black funny. And so often something else—in the case of Clifford Odets, for example, heart-breaking funny. I suppose I've come out frightened, thoroughly frightened of liberals. Most radicals of the time were comic but the liberals were frightening.

Hellman's third volume of memoirs, Scoundrel Time, was published in 1976. It illustrated the exciting artistic time and had an influential tone closely associated with the beginning of the feminist movement. In 1976, Hellman posed in a fur coat for the Blackglama national advertising campaign "What Becomes a Legend Most?" In August of that year, she received the Edward MacDowell Medal for her contribution to literature. In October, she received the Paul Robeson Award from Actors' Equity.

In 1976, Hellman's publisher, Little Brown, canceled its contract to publish a book of Diana Trilling's essays because Trilling refused to delete four passages critical of Hellman. When Trilling's collection appeared in 1977, the New York Times critic expressed his preference for the "simple confession of error" Hellman made in Scoundrel Time for her "acquiescence in Stalinism" to what he called Trilling's excuses for her own behavior during McCarthyism. Arthur L. Herman, however, later called Scoundrel Time "breathtaking dishonesty".

Hellman presented the Academy Award for Best Documentary Film at a ceremony on March 28, 1977. Greeted by a standing ovation, she said:

I was once upon a time a respectable member of this community. Respectable didn't necessarily mean more than I took a daily bath when I was sober, didn't spit except when I meant to, and mispronounced a few words of fancy French. Then suddenly, even before Senator Joe McCarthy reached for that rusty, poisoned ax, I and many others were no longer acceptable to the owners of this industry. ... [T]hey confronted the wild charges of Joe McCarthy with a force and courage of a bowl of mashed potatoes. I have no regrets for that period. Maybe you never do when you survive, but I have a mischievous pleasure in being restored to respectability, understanding full well that the younger generation who asked me here tonight meant more by that invitation than my name or my history.

The 1977 Oscar-winning film Julia was based on the "Julia" chapter of Pentimento. On June 30, 1976, as the film was going into production, Hellman wrote about the screenplay to its producer:

This is not a work of fiction and certain laws have to be followed for that reason ... Your major difficulty to me is the treatment of Lillian as the leading character. The reason is simple: no matter what she does in this story—and I do not deny the danger I was in when I took the money into Germany—my role was passive. And nobody and nothing can change that unless you write a fictional and different story ... Isn't it necessary to know that I am a Jew? That, of course, is what mainly made the danger.

In a 1979 television interview, author Mary McCarthy, long Hellman's political adversary and the object of her negative literary judgment, said of Hellman, "every word she writes is a lie, including 'and' and 'the'." Hellman responded by filing a $2,500,000 defamation suit against McCarthy, interviewer Dick Cavett, and PBS. McCarthy in turn produced evidence she said proved that Hellman had lied in some accounts of her life. Cavett said he sympathized more with McCarthy than Hellman but that "everybody lost" in the lawsuit. Norman Mailer unsuccessfully tried to mediate the dispute through an open letter he published in The New York Times. At the time of her death, Hellman was still in litigation with McCarthy; her executors dropped the suit.

=== Later years and death ===
In 1980, Hellman published a short novel, Maybe: A Story. Though presented as fiction, Hellman, Hammett, and other real-life people appeared as characters. It received a mixed reception and was sometimes read as another installment of Hellman's memoirs. Hellman's editor wrote to The New York Times to question a reviewer's attempt to check the facts in the novel, calling it a work of fiction whose characters misremember and dissemble.

In 1983, New York psychiatrist Muriel Gardiner claimed she was the basis for the title character in Julia and that she had never known Hellman. Hellman denied the character was based on Gardiner. As the events Hellman described matched Gardiner's account of her life and Gardiner's family was closely tied to Hellman's attorney, Wolf Schwabacher, some critics believe that Hellman appropriated Gardiner's story without attribution.

Hellman died on June 30, 1984, aged 79, from a heart attack near her home on Martha's Vineyard. She is buried beneath a pine tree on a rise at one end of Abels Hill/Chilmark Cemetery on Martha's Vineyard.

== Archive ==
Hellman's papers are held by the Harry Ransom Center at the University of Texas at Austin. They include an extensive collection of manuscript drafts, contracts, correspondence, scrapbooks, speeches, teaching notes, awards, legal documents, appointment books, and honorary degrees.

== Legacy ==
Institutions that awarded Hellman honorary degrees include Brandeis University (1955), Wheaton College (1960), Mt. Holyoke College (1966), Smith College (1974), Yale University (1974), and Columbia University (1976).

Human Rights Watch administers the Hellman/Hammett grant program named for the two writers.

Hellman is the central character in Peter Feibleman's 1993 play Cakewalk, which depicts his relationship with Hellman, based in turn on Feibleman's 1988 memoir of their relationship, Lilly, which describes "his tumultuous time as her lover, caretaker, writing partner and principal heir."

In 1999, Kathy Bates directed a television film, Dash and Lilly, based on the relationship between Hellman and Hammett.

Hellman's feud with Mary McCarthy formed the basis for Nora Ephron's 2002 play Imaginary Friends, with music by Marvin Hamlisch and lyrics by Craig Carnelia.

William Wright wrote The Julia Wars, based on the legal battle between Hellman and McCarthy. Chuck Palahniuk's novel Tell-All (2010) was described by Janet Maslin in The New York Times as "a looney pipe dream that savages Lillian Hellman". Dorothy Gallagher wrote a biography of Hellman, Lillian Hellman: An Imperious Life.

== Works ==
=== Plays ===
- The Children's Hour (1934)
- Days to Come (1936)
- The Little Foxes (1939)
- Watch on the Rhine (1941)
- The Searching Wind (1944)
- Another Part of the Forest (1946)
- Montserrat (1949) (English-language adaptation of the play by Emmanuel Robles)
- The Autumn Garden (1951)
- The Lark (1955) (English-language adaptation of Jean Anouilh's play L'Alouette)
- Toys in the Attic (1960)
- My Mother, My Father and Me (1963) (based on Burt Blechman's novel How Much?)

=== Novel ===
- Maybe: A Story (1980)

=== Operetta ===
- Candide (1956) (book, later rewritten by Hugh Wheeler)

=== Screenplays ===
- The Dark Angel (1935) (with Mordaunt Shairp; based on the play by Guy Bolton)
- These Three (1936) (based on her play The Children's Hour)
- Dead End (1937) (based on the play by Sidney Kingsley)
- The Little Foxes (1941) (based on her play)
- The North Star (1943)
- The Searching Wind (1946) (based on her play)
- The Chase (1966) (based on the play and novel by Horton Foote)

=== Memoirs ===
- An Unfinished Woman: A Memoir (1969)
- Pentimento: A Book of Portraits (1973)
- Scoundrel Time (1976)
- Eating Together: Recipes and Recollections, with Peter Feibleman (1984)

also:

- Preface to The Big Knockover, a collection of Hammett's stories (1963)
- Three, a 1980 collection of her first three memoirs
