= Ethel Schwabacher =

American painter

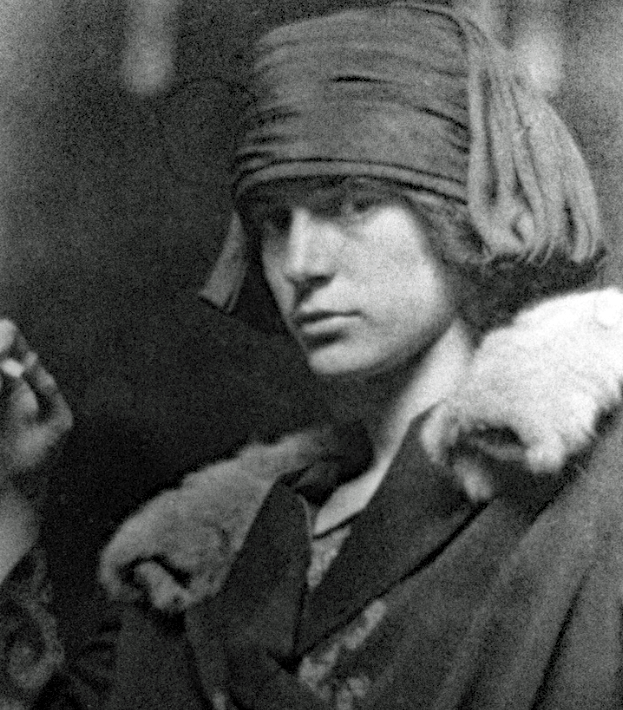
- Photo of American painter Ethel Schwabacher
- Born: Ethel Kremer; May 20, 1903; New York City, U.S.
- Died: November 25, 1984 (aged 81); New York City, U.S.
- Known for: Painting
- Movement: Abstract Expressionism
- Spouse: Wolf Schwabacher

Warm Rain I, 1959, by Ethel Schwabacher

Ethel Kremer Schwabacher (May 20, 1903 — November 25, 1984) was an American painter and writer. An influential figure in the abstract expressionist movement, she was represented by the Betty Parsons Gallery in the 1950s and 1960s. She was a protégé and the first biographer of Arshile Gorky, and friends with many prominent painters in New York at that time, including Willem de Kooning, Richard Pousette-Dart, Kenzo Okada, and José Guerrero. She was also the author of a monograph on the artist John Charles Ford and a memoir, Hungry for Light.

== Biography ==
Schwabacher was born Ethel Kremer in New York City in 1903. Her family moved to suburban Pelham, New York, in 1908, where she first began painting in their garden. She attended the Horace Mann School and at age 15 enrolled at the Art Students League of New York. She also studied sculpture at the National Academy of Design until 1921. During 1921, Arnold Genthe took several photographs of her. After an apprenticeship in stone carving with the sculptor Anna Hyatt Huntington, in 1927 Schwabacher abandoned sculpture and enrolled in Max Weber's painting class at the Art Students League. That year she met Armenian-American painter Arshile Gorky, with whom she developed a lasting friendship.

She lived in Europe from 1928 to 1934, and studied privately under Gorky from 1934 to 1936. Gorky introduced her to Surrealist automatism. She was inspired by Gorky's biomorphic abstractions and erotic forms. In the 1930s she began to explore her own subconscious, combining automatism with abstract forms and referring to nature. Schwabacher often interconnected themes of womanhood, childbirth, and children.

In 1934, she married the prominent entertainment lawyer Wolf Schwabacher and had two children: Brenda Webster, American critic and novelist; and Christopher Schwabacher a lawyer in New York. Her cousin George Oppen, an Objectivist poet who went on to win the Pulitzer Prize for Poetry, also lived in New York in the 1930s.

Following the untimely death of her husband, she expressed her personal traumas through the a series of figurative paintings based on Greek myths. She died on November 25, 1984, in New York.

Schwabacher's work is included in the collections of The Metropolitan Museum of Art, the Whitney Museum of American Art, the Solomon R. Guggenheim Museum, the Jewish Museum, the Brooklyn Museum of Art, and Rockefeller University in New York City. Her work has been exhibited in a number of galleries, including the Anita Shapolsky Gallery, the Betty Parsons Gallery and the Green-Ross Gallery in New York City.

Her work was featured in "Women of Abstract Expressionism" at the Denver Art Museum from June–September, 2016, and at the Palm Springs Art Museum in 2017.

In 2023 her work was included in the exhibition Action, Gesture, Paint: Women Artists and Global Abstraction 1940-1970 at the Whitechapel Gallery in London.

In 2023, the Berry Campbell Gallery in New York presented 'Woman in Nature (Paintings From the 1950s),' the artist's first solo show in New York in 30 years.

== Themes ==
Much like her female abstract expressionist contemporary Lee Krasner, whose work was cast in her husband’s shadow until his death, Schwabacher’s work stands as an example of gender politics in art as her works are continually attributed her role as a woman, wife, and mother.

Her allusion to Greek themes and myths in the Odes series are said to have been influenced by the death of her husband, but this assertion fails to consider her interest in the Surrealism movement.

She uses loose brushstrokes and bold colors to explore themes central to the abstract expressionist movement — psychoanalysis, dream states, and the unconscious.

== See also ==
- Bodley Gallery
