= Pentimento: A Book of Portraits =

Book by Lillian Hellman

- Cover for a 1974 Canadian printing
- Author: Lillian Hellman
- Publisher: Little, Brown and Company

Pentimento: A Book of Portraits is a 1973 book by American writer Lillian Hellman. It takes the form of an autobiographical work, focusing on "portraits" of various people that had effects on the author throughout her life.

The book was subject to controversy over the authenticity of a section about an anti-Nazi Resistance member called "Julia", which was later made into Fred Zinneman's film Julia. A psychiatrist named Muriel Gardiner later suggested that her life story was fictionalized as Julia. Gardiner was a wealthy American who went to medical school in the First Austrian Republic following World War I and became involved in the illegal and underground Social Democratic Party of Austria under the rule of Engelbert Dollfuss and the later Austrian Resistance to Nazism there before her return to the US in 1939.

== Reception ==
Contemporary reviews of the book were generally positive. Christopher Lehmann-Haupt thought it a response to criticisms of a lack of self confidence in her previous autobiographical work, An Unfinished Woman, and thought it was an extremely revealing about Hellman.

=== Controversy ===
The Oscar-winning film Julia was based on one chapter of Pentimento. Following the film's release in 1977, New York psychiatrist Muriel Gardiner claimed she was the basis for the title character. The story presents "Julia" as a close friend of Hellman's living in pre-Nazi Austria. Hellman helps her friend to smuggle money for anti-Nazi activity from Russia. In fact Hellman had never met Gardiner. Hellman denied that the character was based on Gardiner, but never identified a real-life alternative. Hellman and Gardiner had the same lawyer (Wolf Schwabacher) who had been privy to Gardiner's memoirs. The events depicted in the film conformed to those described in Gardiner's 1983 memoir Code Name Mary.

An investigation by Samuel McCraken into the particulars of Hellman's Julia story that was published in Commentary in June 1984 concluded that the funeral home in London where Hellman said Julia's body was sent did not exist, there was no record that Hellman had sailed to England to claim Julia's body on the ship she said she had made the transatlantic crossing on, and there was no evidence that Julia had lived or died. Furthermore, McCracken found it highly unlikely, as did Gardiner, who had worked with the anti-fascist underground, that so many people would have been used to help Hellman get money to Julia, or that money would be couriered in the way that Hellman said it did as Hellman admitted that Julia received money from the J. P. Morgan Bank.

Ephraim London, Hellman's attorney in her libel suit against Mary McCarthy (who had publicly questioned Hellman's veracity, including her "Julia" story), admitted that while he believed that there had been a real Julia, Hellman has most likely dramatized her story and added incidents and plot elements that were not strictly true.
