= Den döende dandyn =

Den döende dandyn may refer to:

- Den döende dandyn (The Dying Dandy), a 1918 painting by Nils Dardel
- Den döende dandyn (album), a 1986 album by Magnus Uggla
