= Nils Dardel =

Swedish painter (1888–1943)

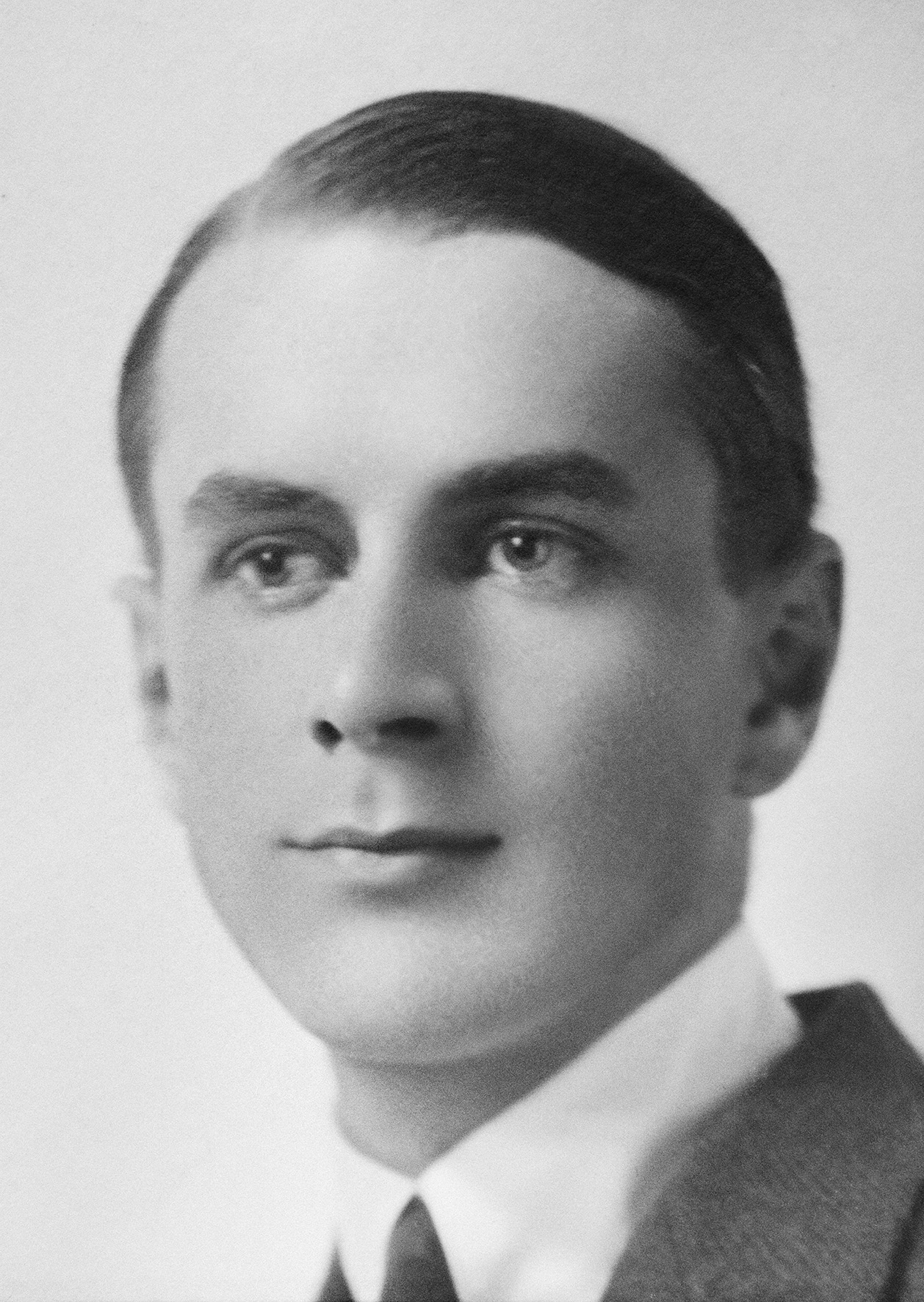
- Dardel in 1917
- Born: Nils Elias Kristofer von Dardel; 25 October 1888; Bettna, Södermanland
- Died: 25 May 1943 (age 54); New York City, United States
- Education: Royal Swedish Academy of Arts
- Notable work: The Dying Dandy
- Style: Post-Impressionism
- Spouse: Thora Klinckowström (m. 1921; div. 1934)
- Children: Ingrid von Dardel

Nils Elias Kristofer von Dardel (25 October 1888 – 25 May 1943), sometimes known as Nils de Dardel, was a 20th-century Swedish Post-Impressionist painter and grandson of the famous Swedish painter Fritz von Dardel.

== Biography ==
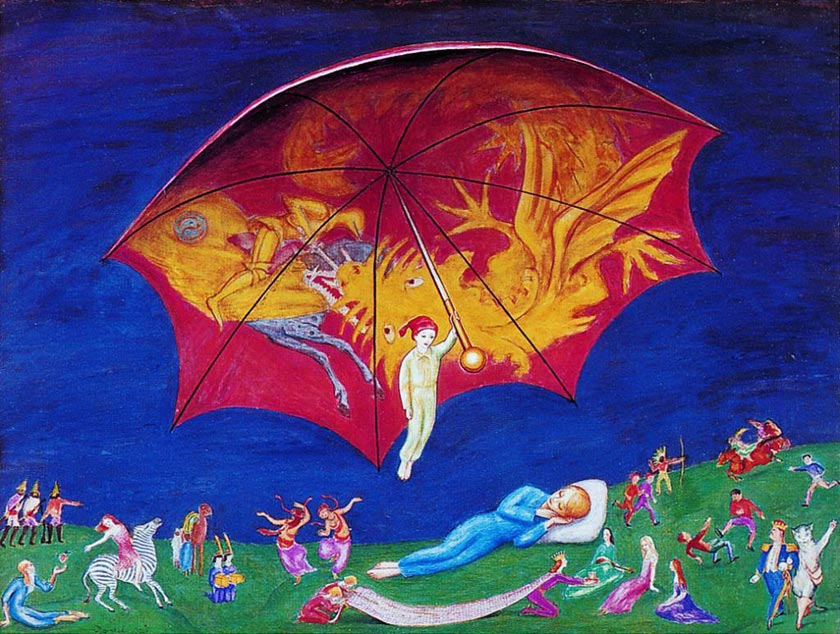
John Blund (1927), on display at the Stockholm Public Library.

Dardel was born in Bettna, Södermanland, Sweden in 1888. He studied at the Royal Swedish Academy of Arts in Stockholm between 1908–1910. Some of his most famous paintings are The Dying Dandy, Crime Passionnel, Svarta Diana and John blund.

=== Family life ===
Nils Dardel was born into the Swedish noble family von Dardel, son of the landowner Fritz August von Dardel and Sofia Matilda Norlin. His grandfather was the Swedish painter Fritz von Dardel, adjutant to the later king Charles XV of Sweden and member of the Royal Swedish Academy of Arts in Stockholm, where Nils later studied between 1908–1920, and of which he eventually became a member in 1934.

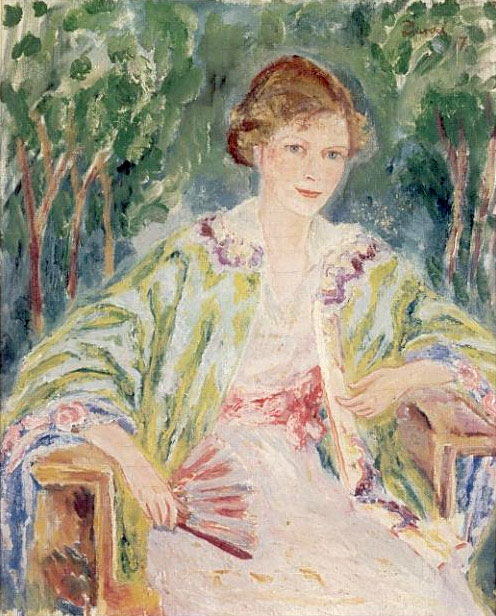
Portrait of Nita Wallenberg in 1917, when Dardel met her in Japan.

In 1919, he proposed to Nita Wallenberg, but her father, a Swedish diplomat, disapproved of Dardel and the marriage was not to be. This was linked closely to the creation of his work Exekution (Execution), which is said to be symbolic of the rejection.

Nils Dardel married the author Thora Dardel (née Klinckowström; 1899–1995), which marriage lasted between 1921–1934. Together they had a daughter Ingrid von Dardel (1922–1962) who like her father became an artist. Both her sons Henry Unger (born 1945), whose father was Gustaf Unger, and Nils Ekwall (born 1954), whose father was Lage Ekwall, in turn were also active Swedish artists.

After the marriage to Thora, sometime in the 1930s Nils met Edita Morris (née Toll; 1902–1988), a Swedish writer with whom he shared his remaining life, though she remained married to Ira Victor Morris.

=== Paris ===
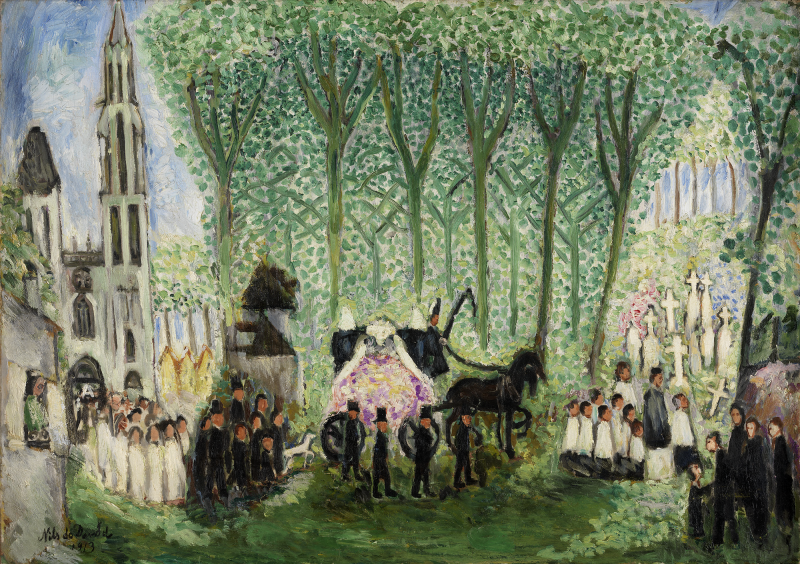
Dardels 1913 work Begravning i Senlis (Funeral in Senlis)

After studying in Sweden he did as many of his contemporaries and traveled to Paris around 1910 (such as Leander Engström, Isaac Grünewald, Einar Jolin, and Sigrid Hjerten who all became students of Henri Matisse). Dardel primarily took inspiration from the Fauvists with their pure palette, the Post-Impressionists, as well as Japanese woodcuts. Dardel also made a brief foray into Cubism, and painted a few cityscapes in the style.

==== Post-Impressionism ====
Dardel explored Pointillism, using strong colors together with very clear motifs. Begravning i Senlis (Funeral in Senlis) from 1913 typifies this style and was painted while Dardel was visiting a staying in the medieval town of Senlis. Another early painting was the portrayal German art dealer Alfred Flechtheim. Over the course of Dardel's life, he primarily painted humans, concentrating on portraiture or paintings of groups of people.

==== Ballets Suédois ====
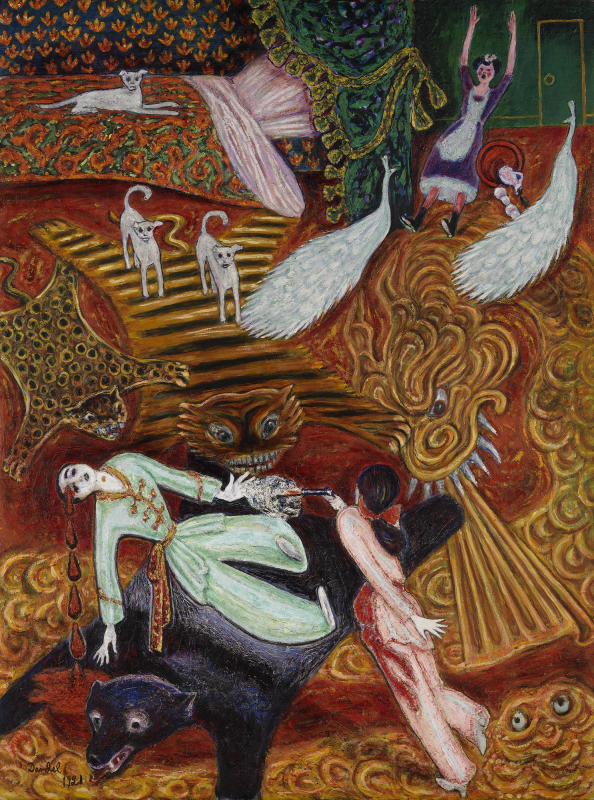
Crime passionel – One of Dardel's paintings from the Ballets Suédois era, depicting a violent scene said to be indicative of Dardel's hectic personal life of the era.

After living in Paris for three years, Dardel and Rolf de Maré became friends. Maré would later create the Ballets Suédois, which performed in Paris between 1920 and 1925. The friendship benefited Dardel as Maré was able to act as a benefactor for Dardel's art, and the duo is also claimed to have been fruitful for Maré's dance company.

In the early 1920s, Dardel created a number of works based upon stage sets, and these have been likened to sketches of drama or film. Dardel also created the stage sets for Midsummer Wake (music by Hugo Alfvén), and Maison de Fous (a dance drama with compositions by Viking Dahl). Crime passionnel (Crime of Passion) from 1921 is typical of Dardel's paintings from this era.

=== Travels ===
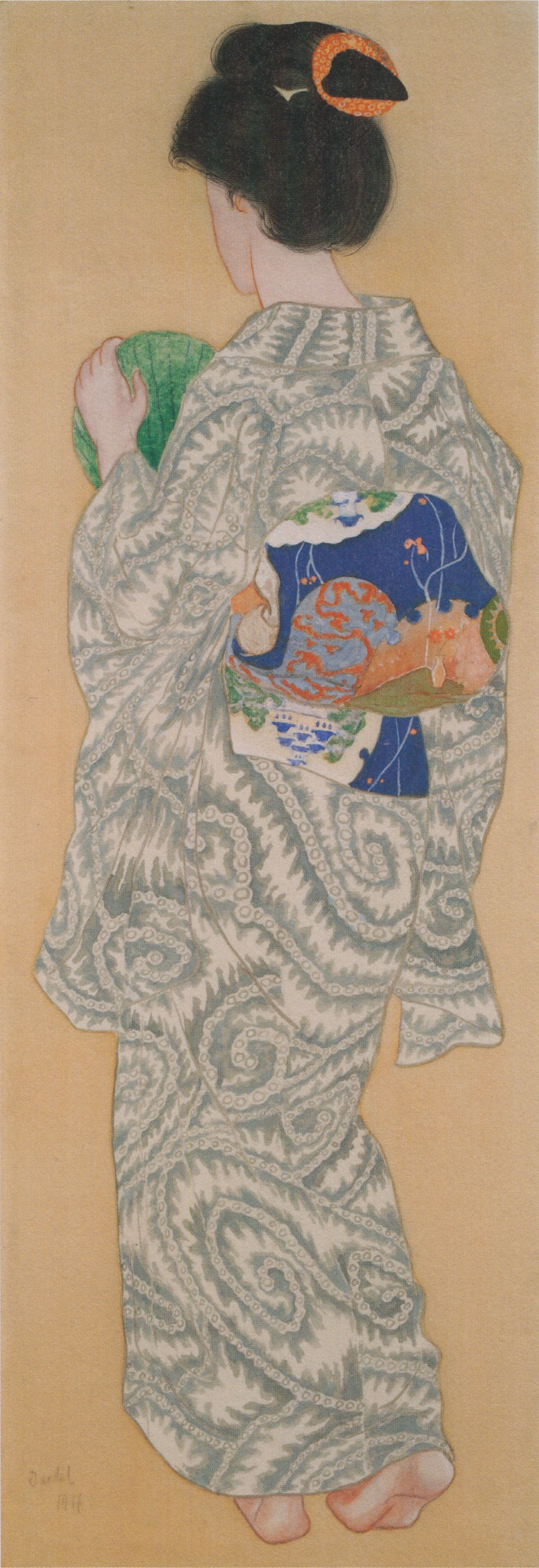
Japanska (med rygg mot betraktaren) – Japanese woman (with back towards the viewer), shows influences of Dardels 1917 visit to Japan, including the medium, silk.

Nils was a prolific traveler, picking up influences and motives from different countries.

=== Later years ===
Dardel lived a nomadic life, traveling far and wide without ever really settling down. Many of his portraits are of people and places whom he met along his travels. He was known to be self-destructive.

Not exceptionally appreciated in his lifetime, his breakthrough in Sweden came simultaneously to the breaking out of World War II in Europe, at the time when Liljevalchs konsthall displayed a retrospective of Dardel's life and works.

== Legacy ==
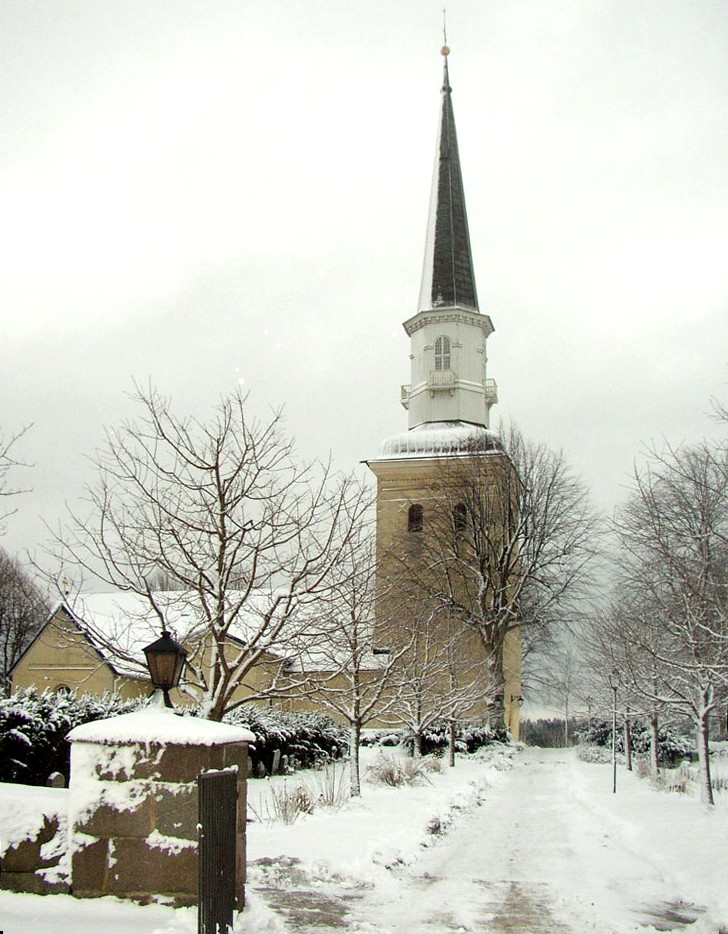
Ekerö Church outside Stockholm, where Nils lies buried.

Nils died in New York City in 1943, and was buried in Ekerö cemetery outside of Stockholm.

His works are on display in a number of museums and galleries including Nationalmuseum, Göteborgs konstmuseum, Malmö konstmuseum, Nasjonalgalleriet and Waldermarsudde. His works Självporträtt (Self-portrait) and Visit hos en excentrisk dam (Visit at an eccentric lady) were featured by the Swedish Postal-works 1988 stamp series Svenska konstnärer i Paris (Swedish artists in Paris).

His 1918 work Den döende dandyn (The dying dandy) was sold twice at record prices at Bukowskis in Stockholm; first in 1984 at 3,4 million kronor and again in 1988 for the then termed sensational 13 million kronor. Simultaneously the image took on an iconic role within the 1980s Swedish gay movement. His works came to be analyzed under the budding field of gender-studies, and the ambivalence of the sex of his characters were topic of study.

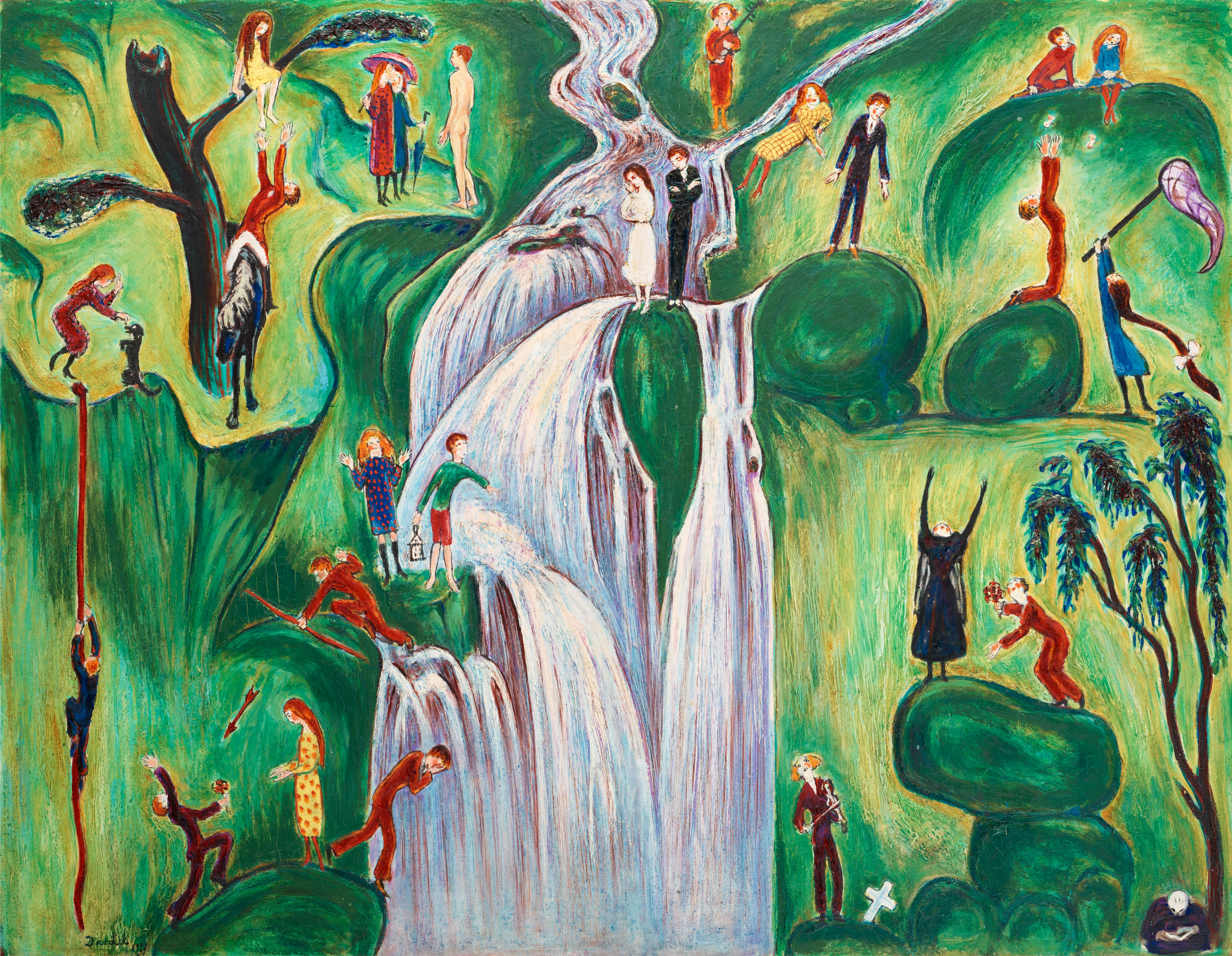
"Vattenfallet", 1921 – sold in 2012 for a record-breaking 25 million kronor.

Dardel's work Vattenfallet (or the Waterfall) sold for 25 million kronor in 2012 and was to date the most expensive modernist Swedish painting ever sold. The buyer was an undisclosed individual. The record in turn supplanted the earlier record held by the Dying Dandy.

== Selected works ==
=== 1900s ===
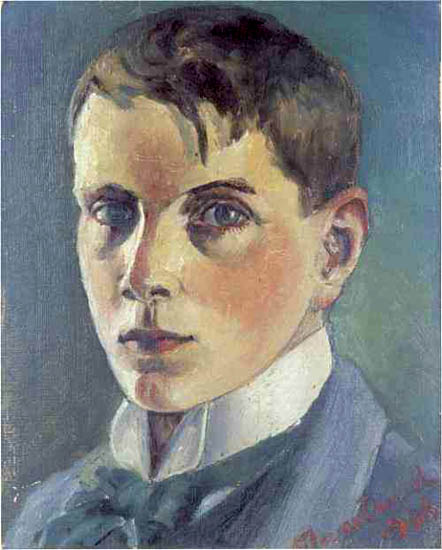
Self-portrait
1906

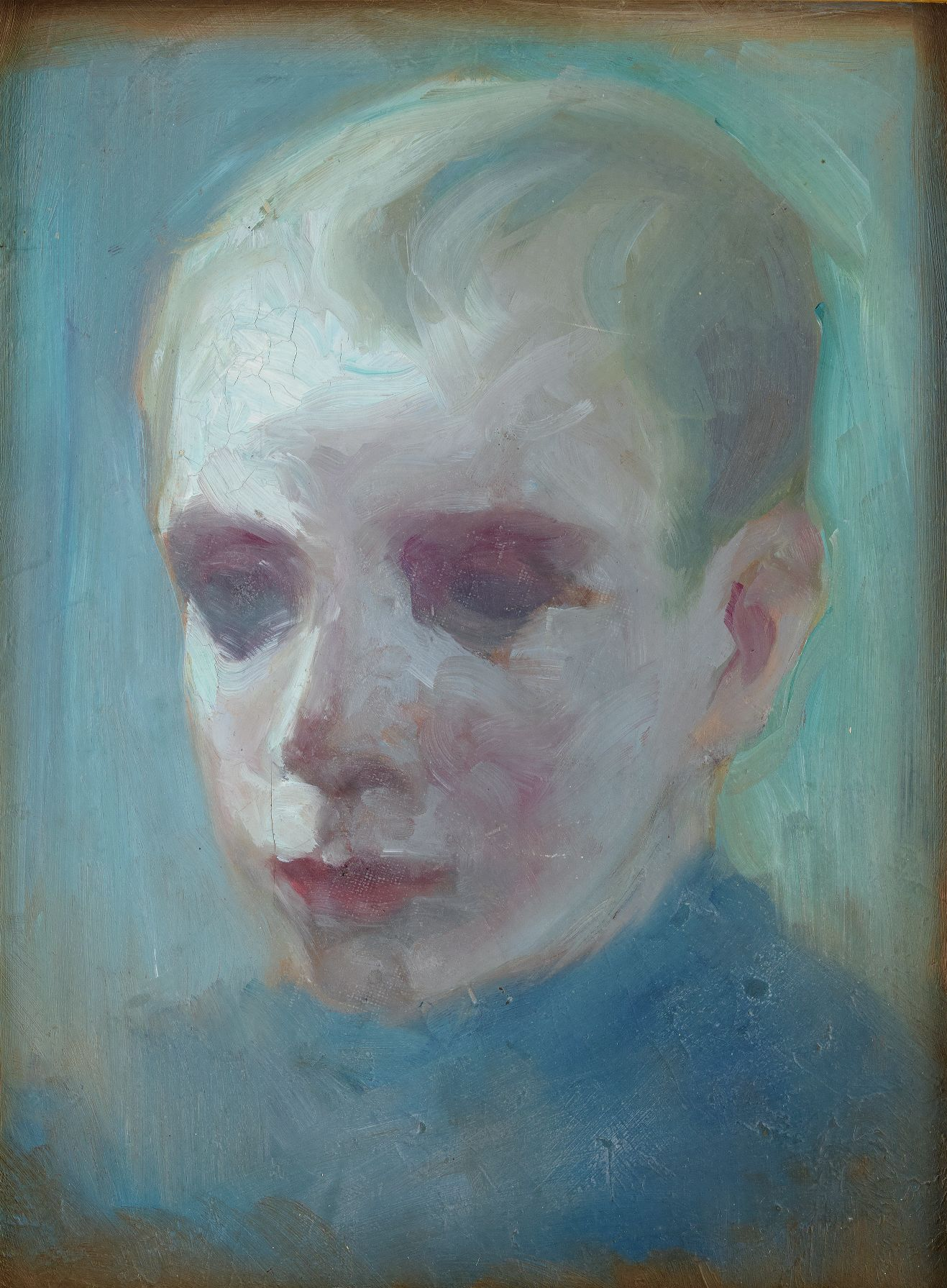
Gosshuvud
Head of a Boy
1908

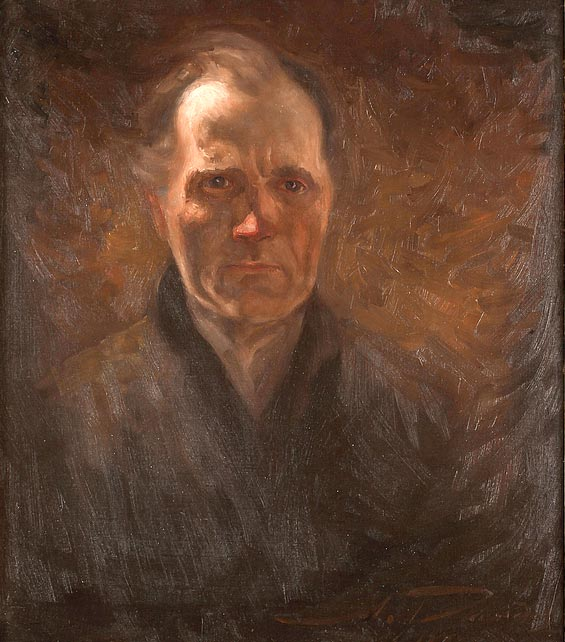
Mansporträtt
Portrait of a man
1908

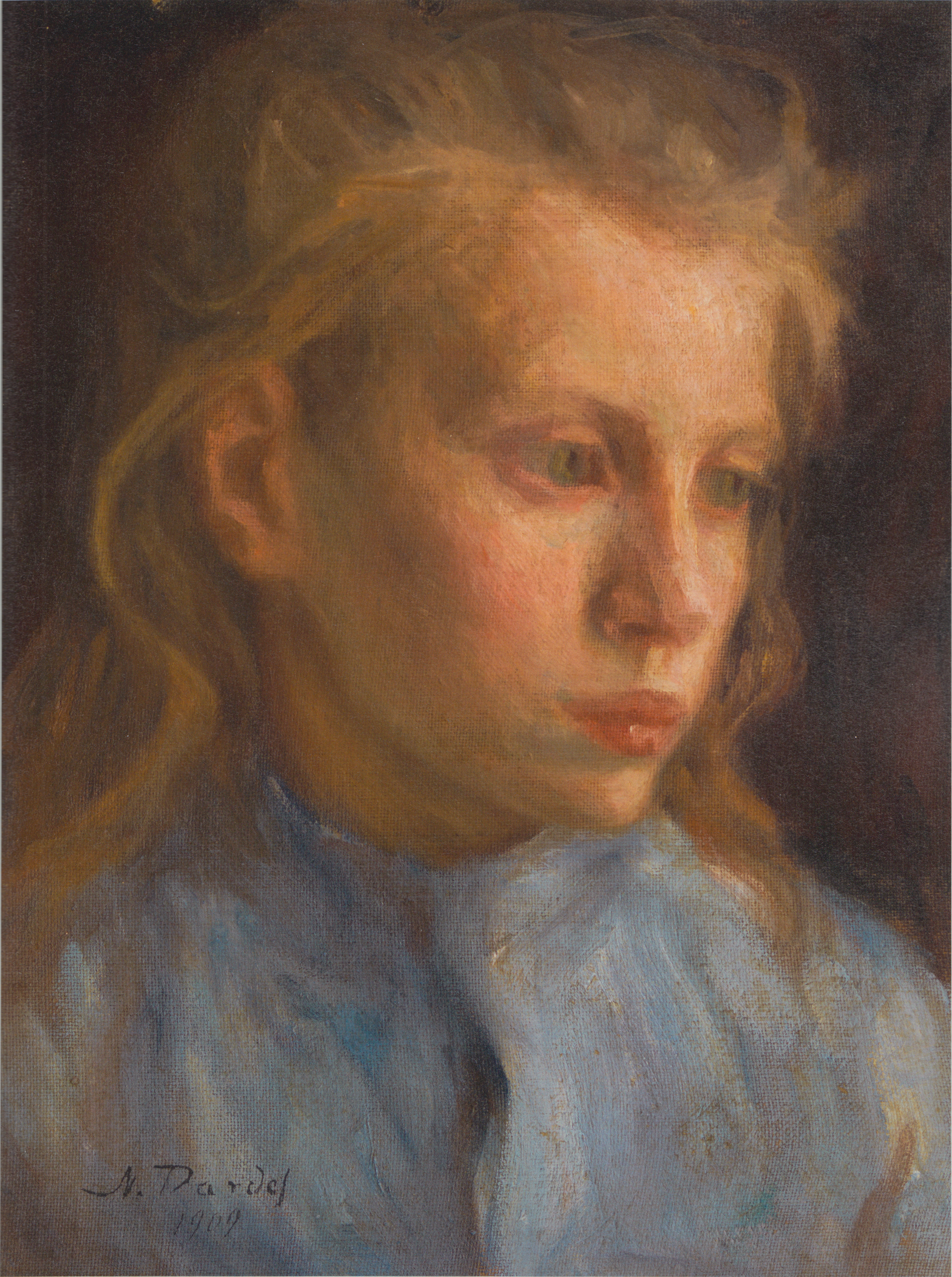
Torparflicka
Farm girl
1909

=== 1910s ===
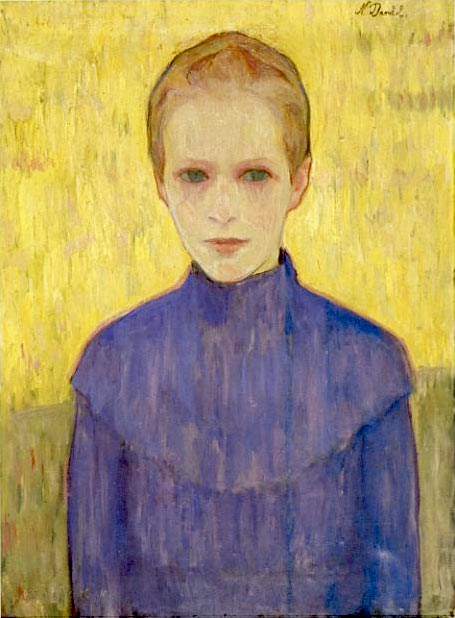
Flicka i blå klänning
Girl in blue dress
1910

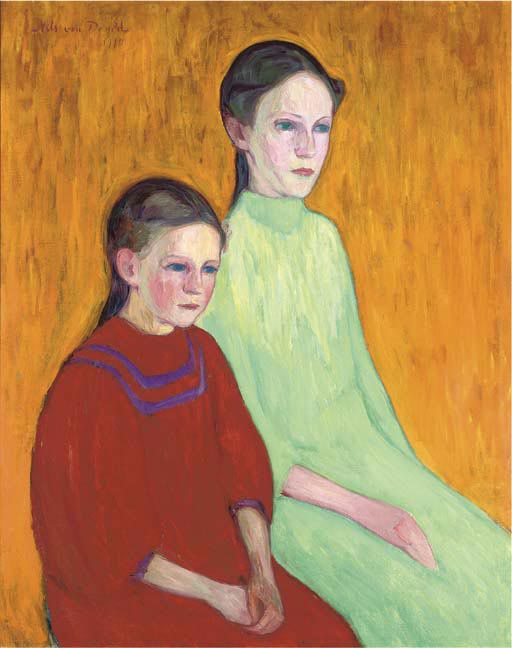
Två flickor
Two Girls
1911

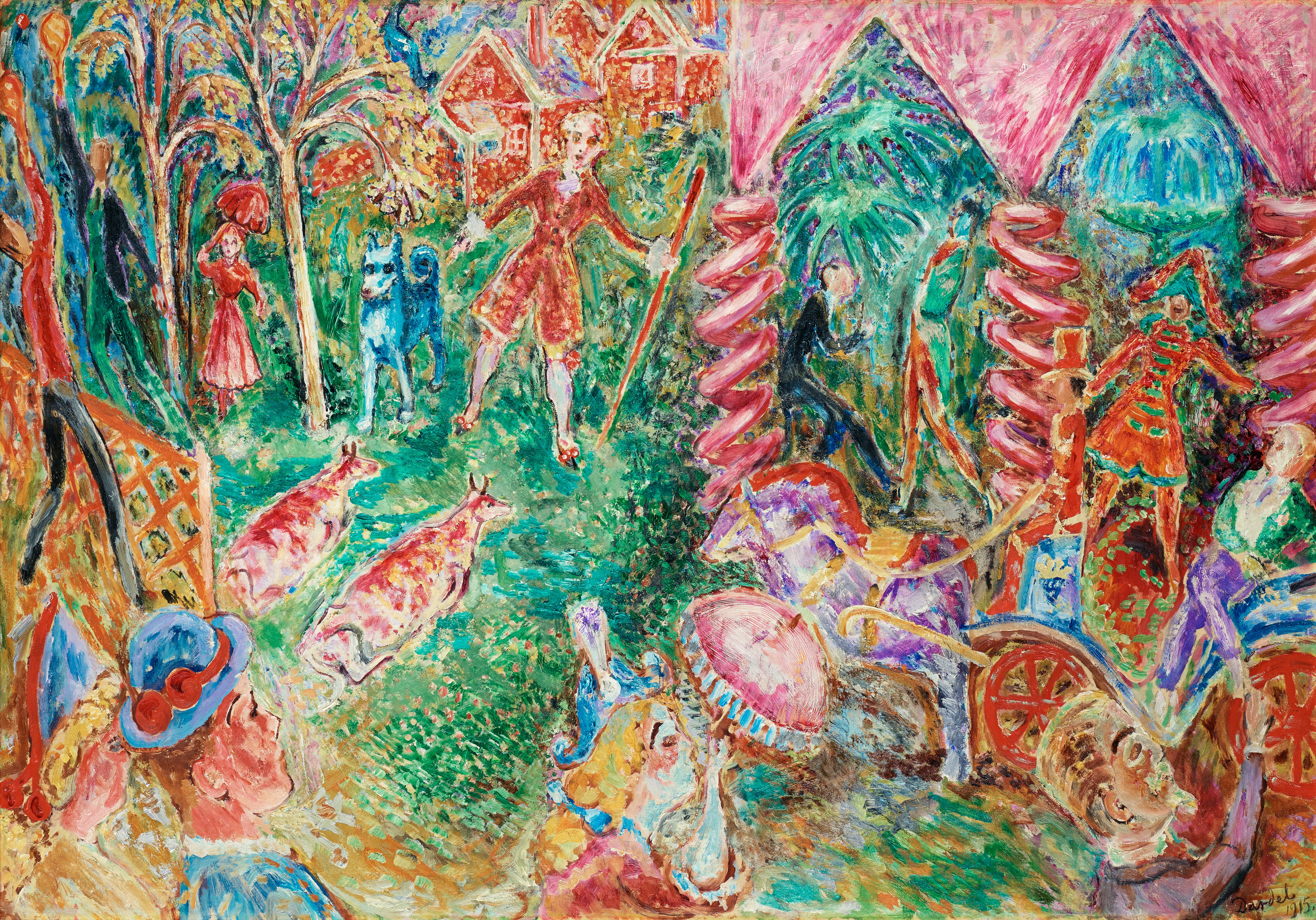
Turisthotellet i Rättvik
Tourist hotel in Rättvik
1915

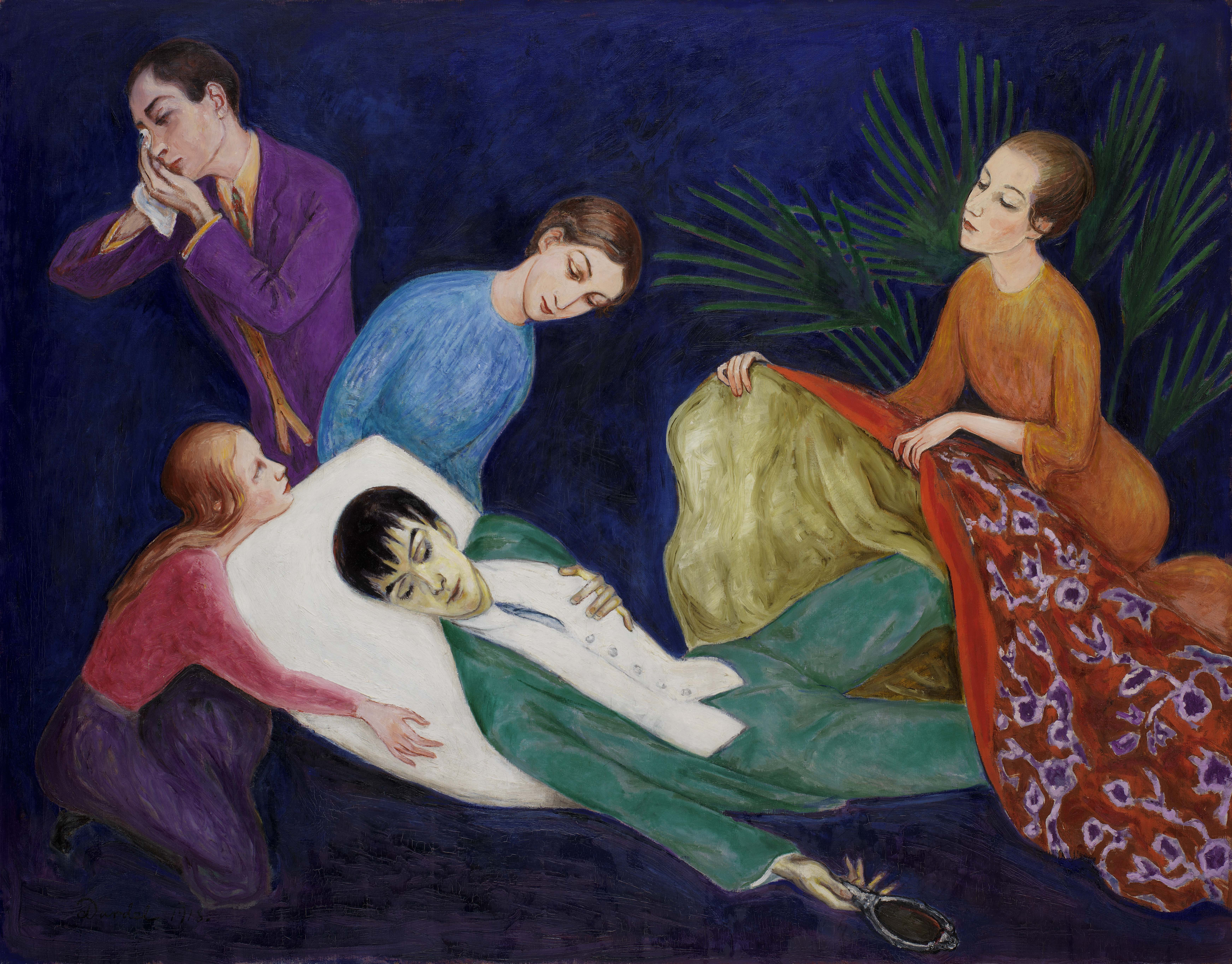
Den döende dandyn
The Dying Dandy
1918

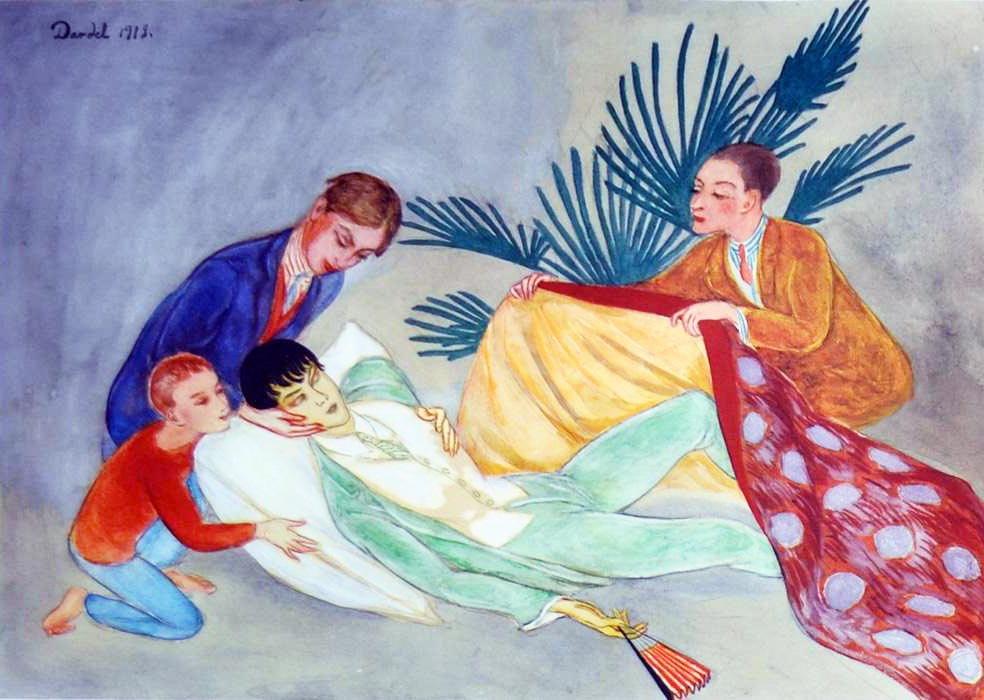
Den döende dandyn
(1st version)
1918

=== 1920s ===
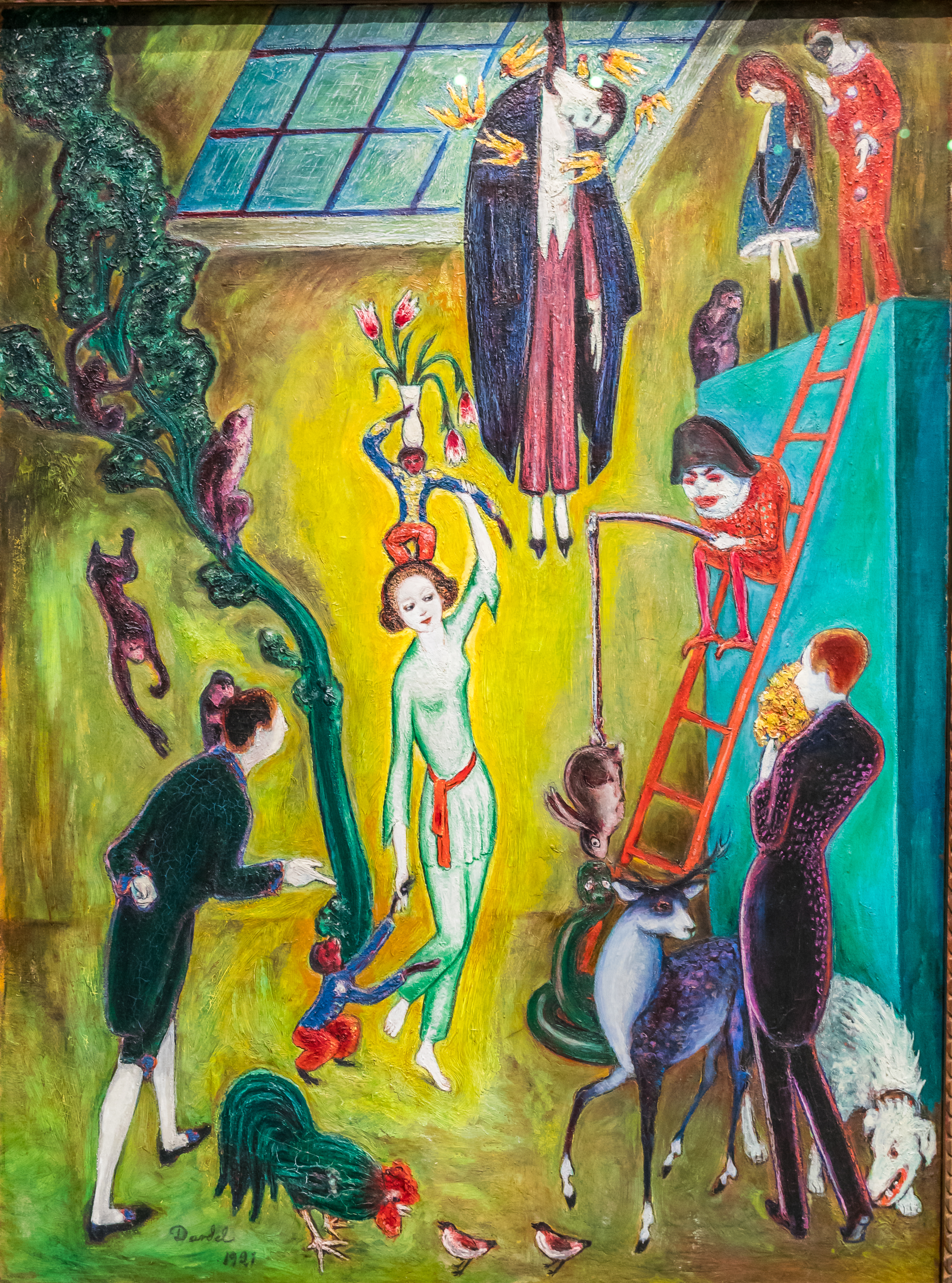
Visit hos excentrisk dam
1921

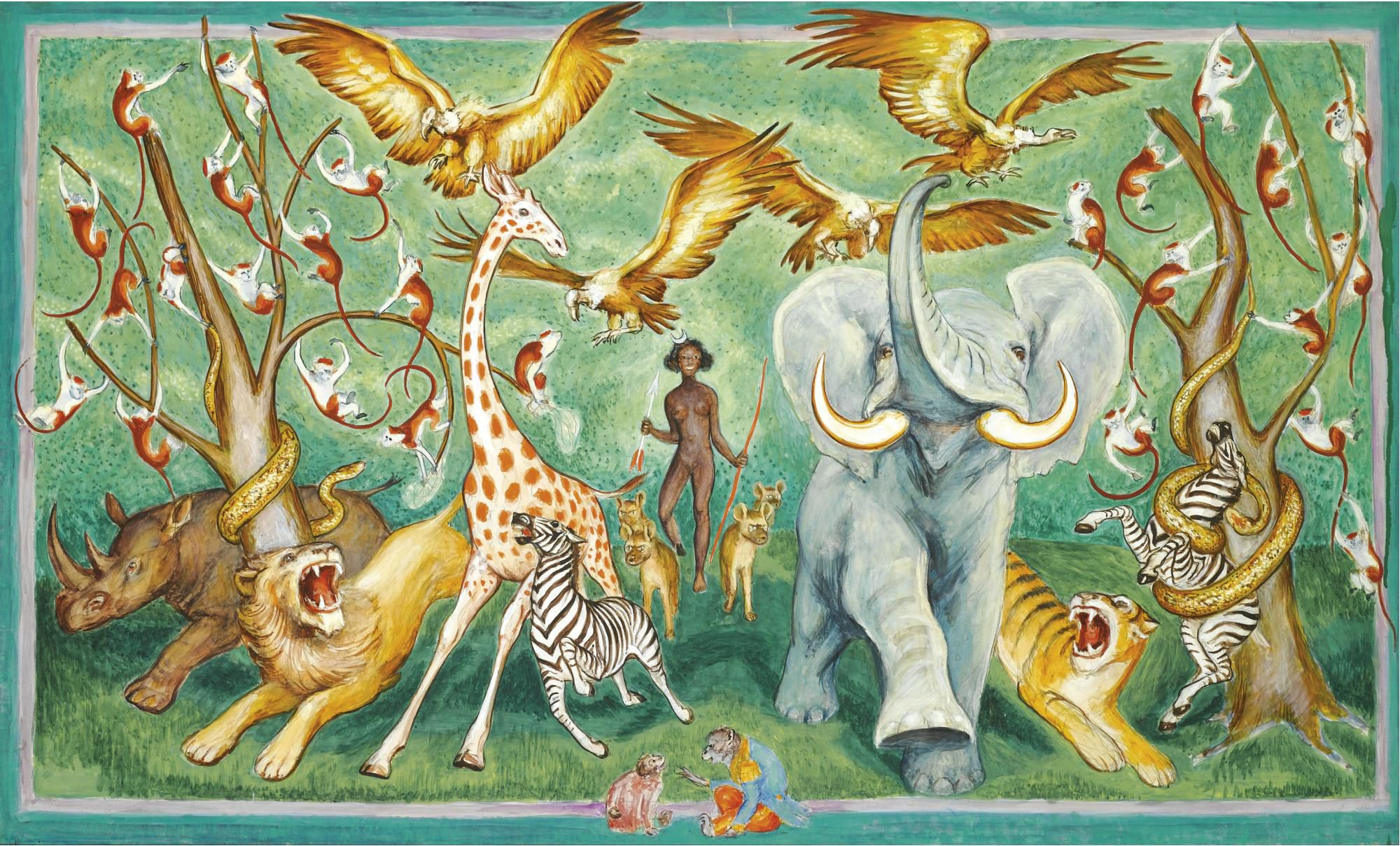
Svarta Diana
Black Diana
1929

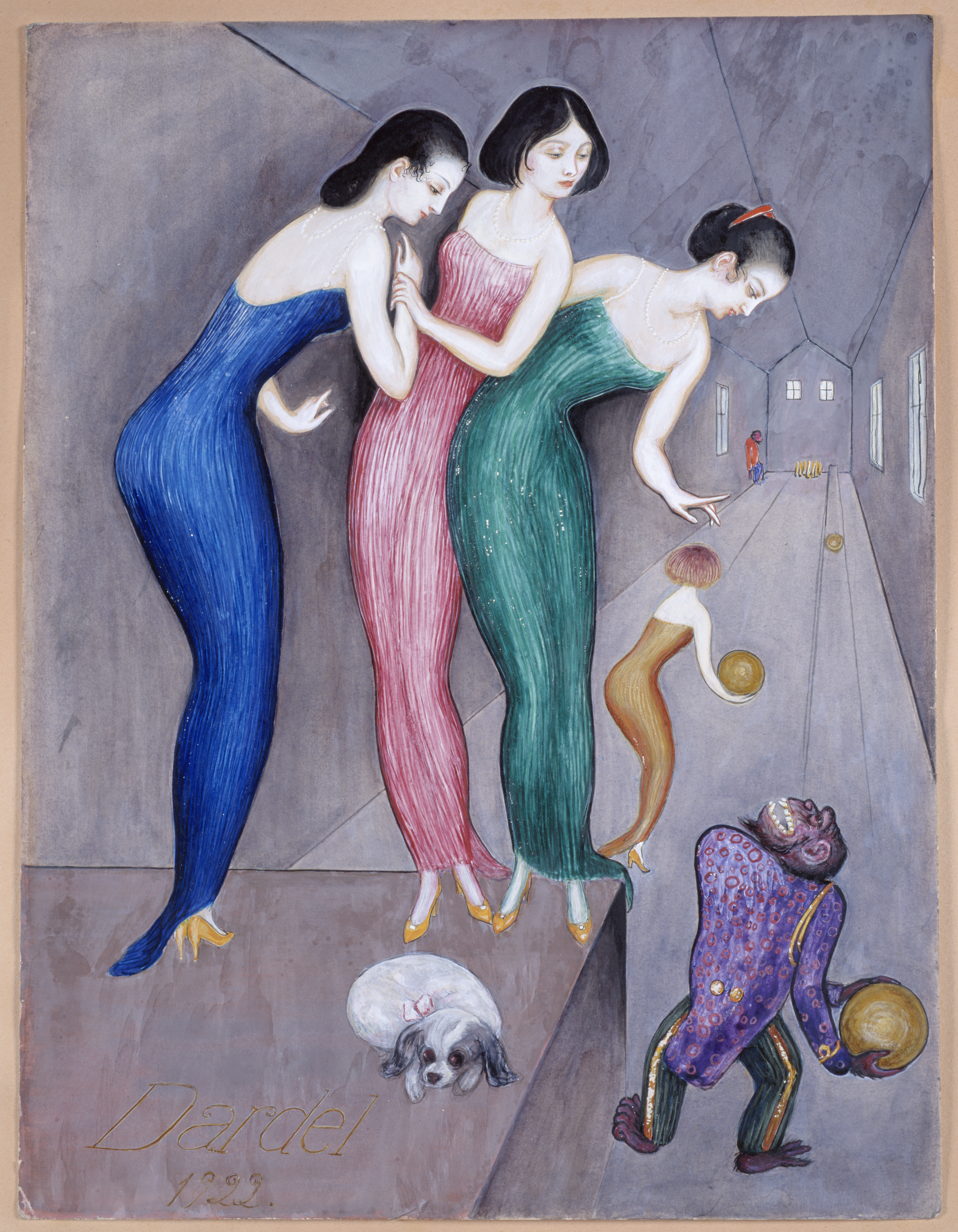
Drömmar och fanstasier #1
Dreams and fantasies
1922

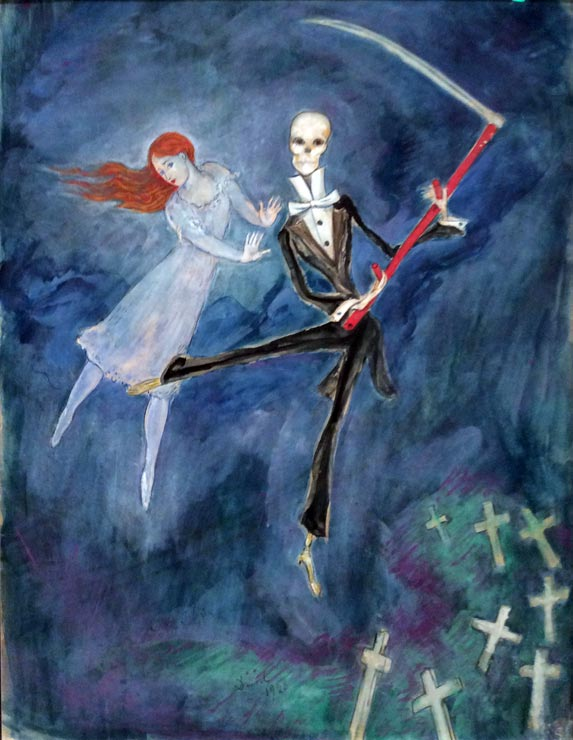
En dans med döden
A dance with Death
1920

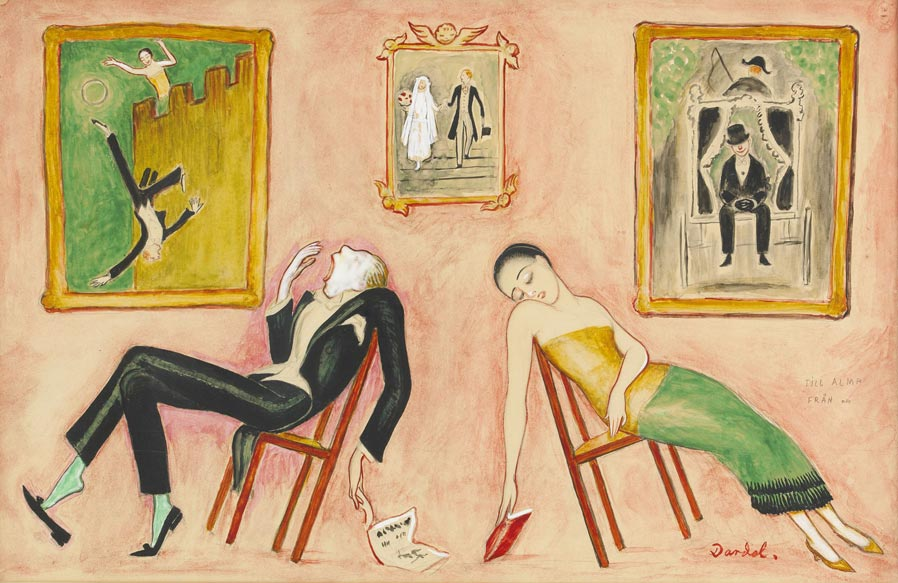
Familjeidyll
Family idyll
1923

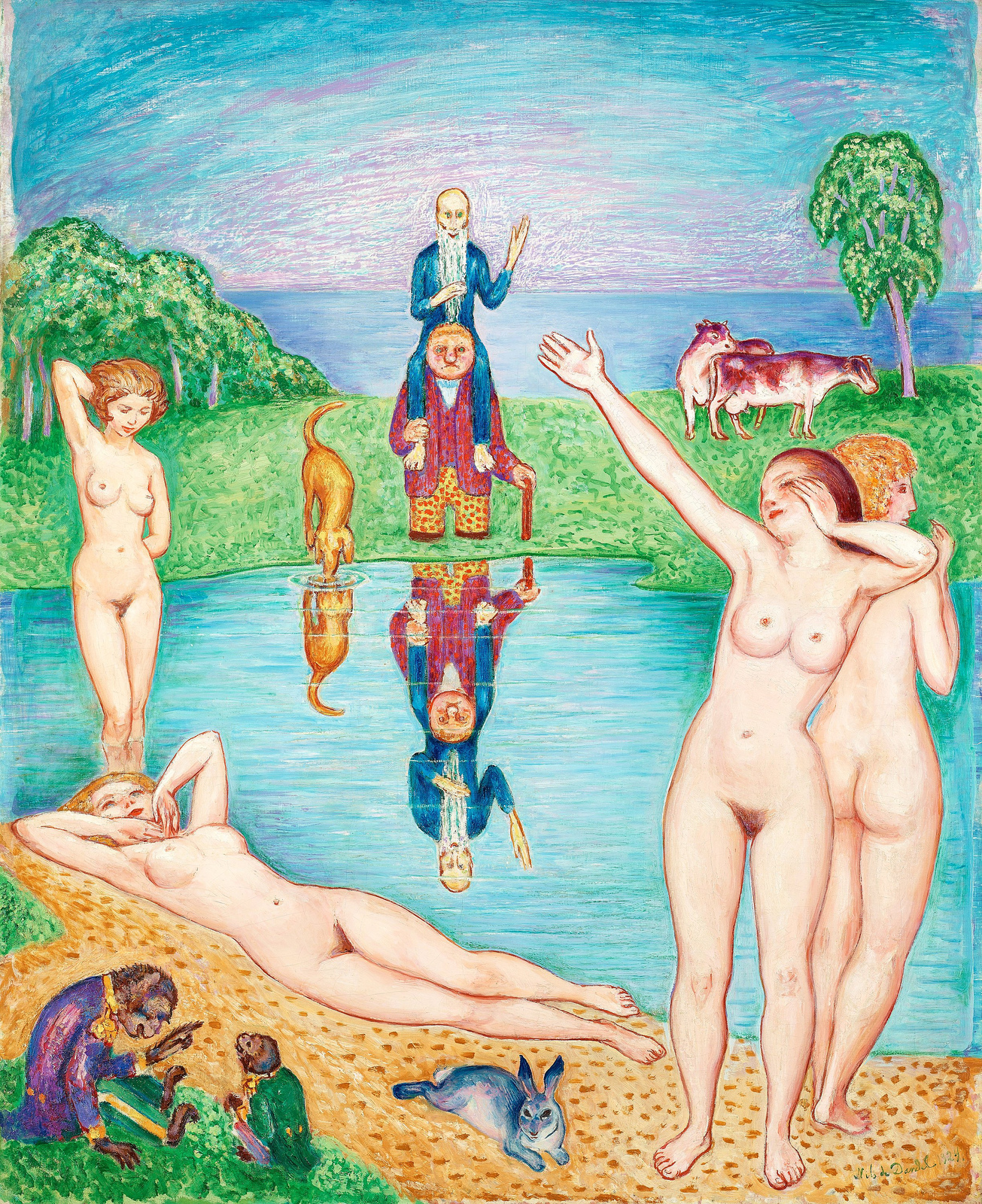
Return to the Playgrounds of Youth
1924

=== 1930s ===
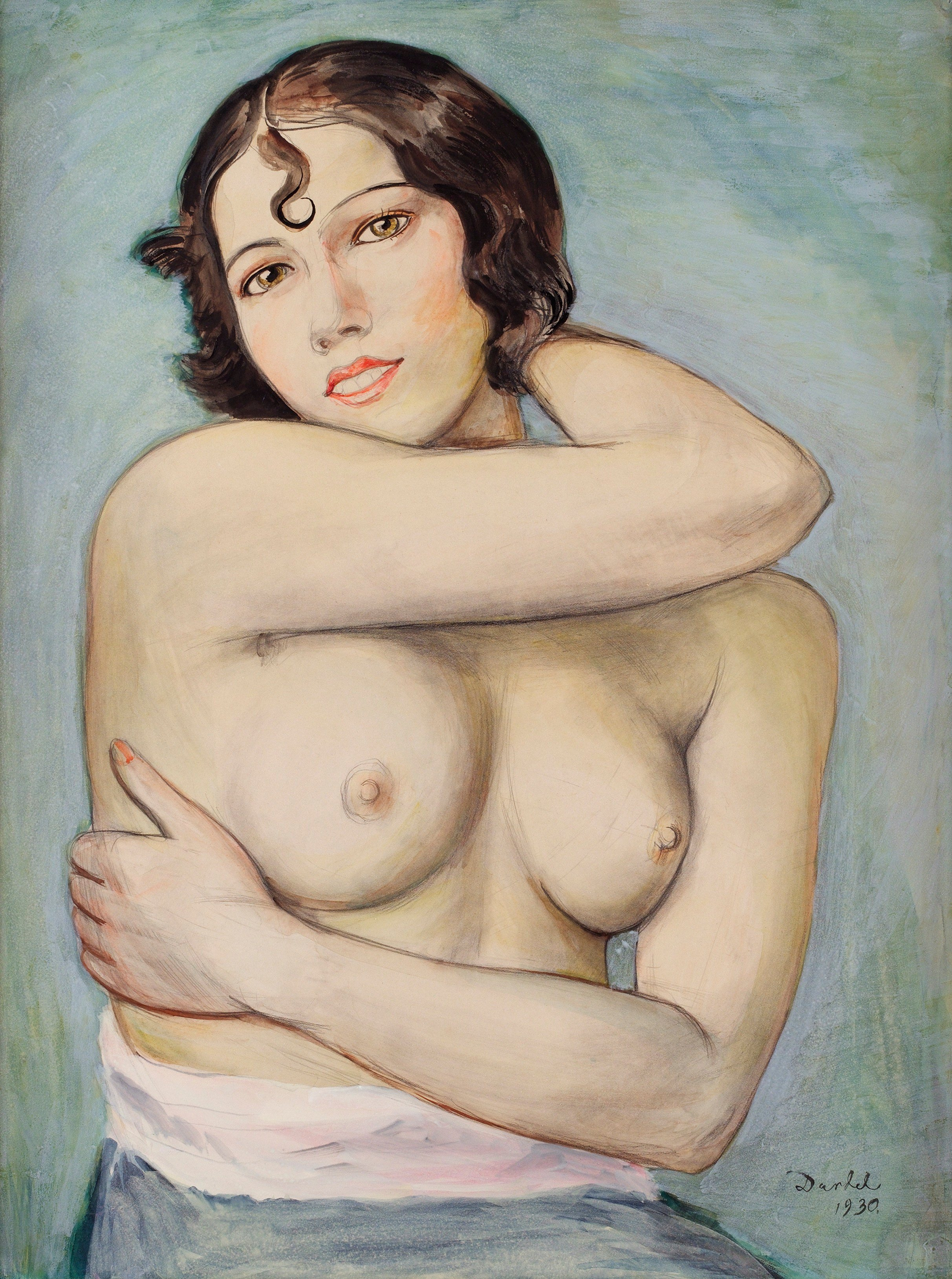
Marthe
1930

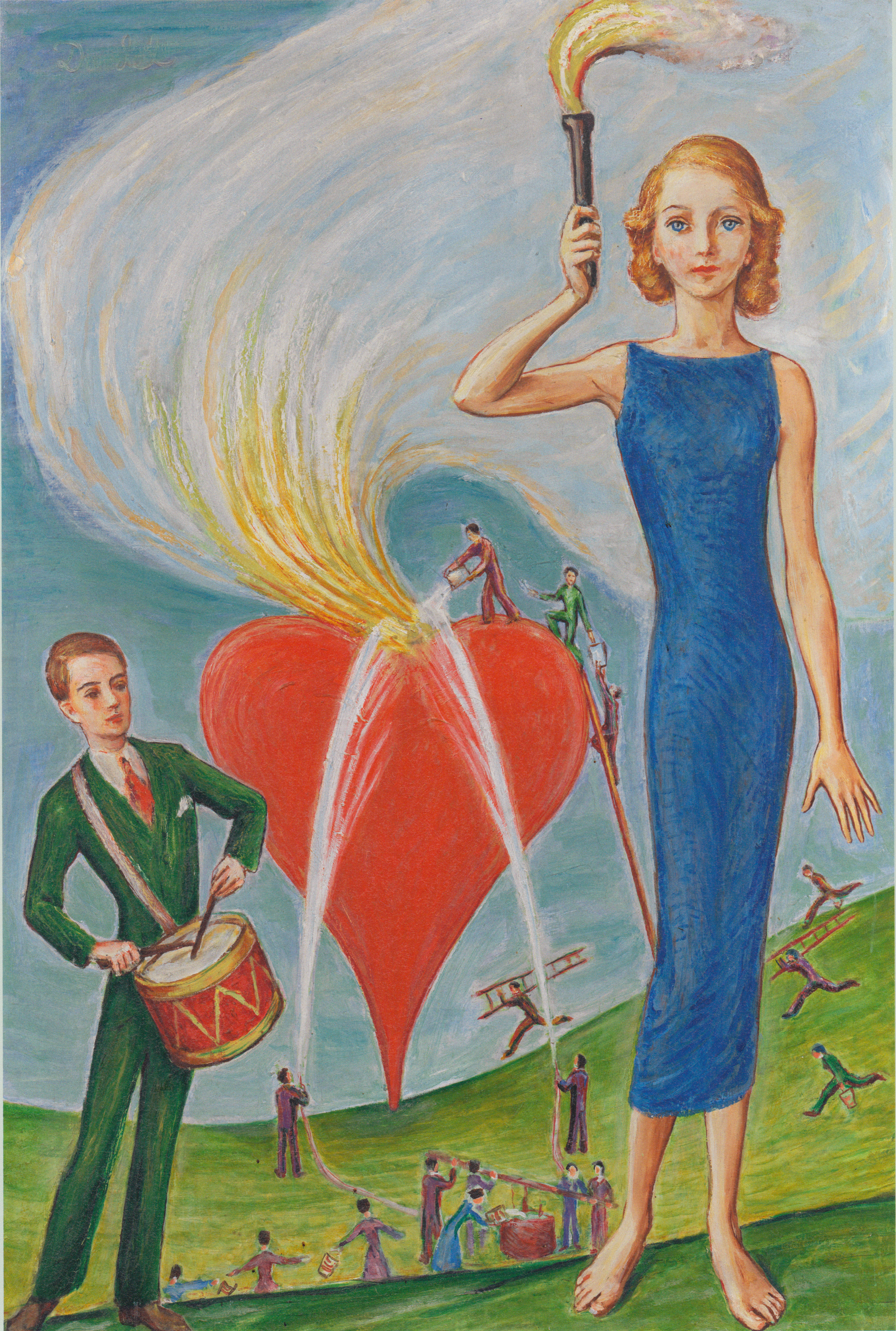
Ett hjärta i brand
A heart in flames
ca. 1930

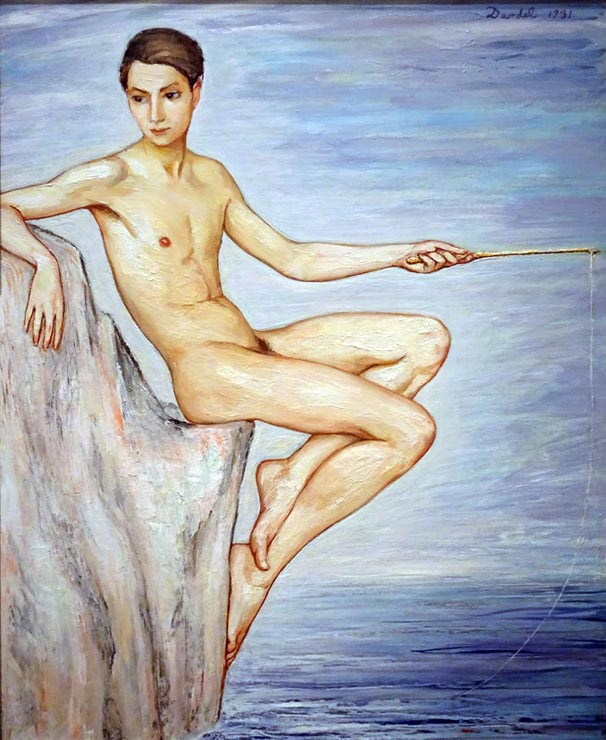
Fiskaren
The angler
1931

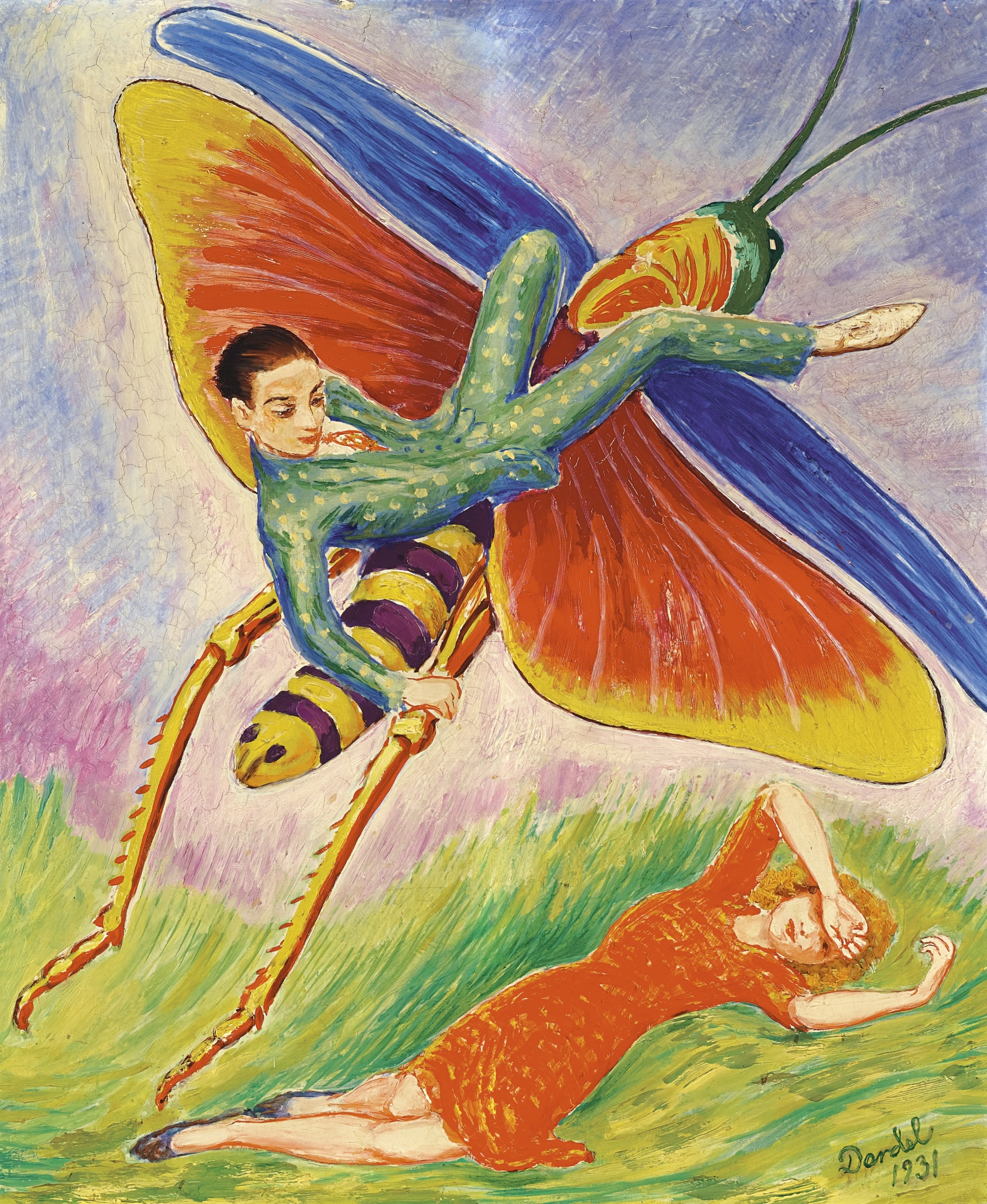
Gräshoppan
The Grasshopper
1931

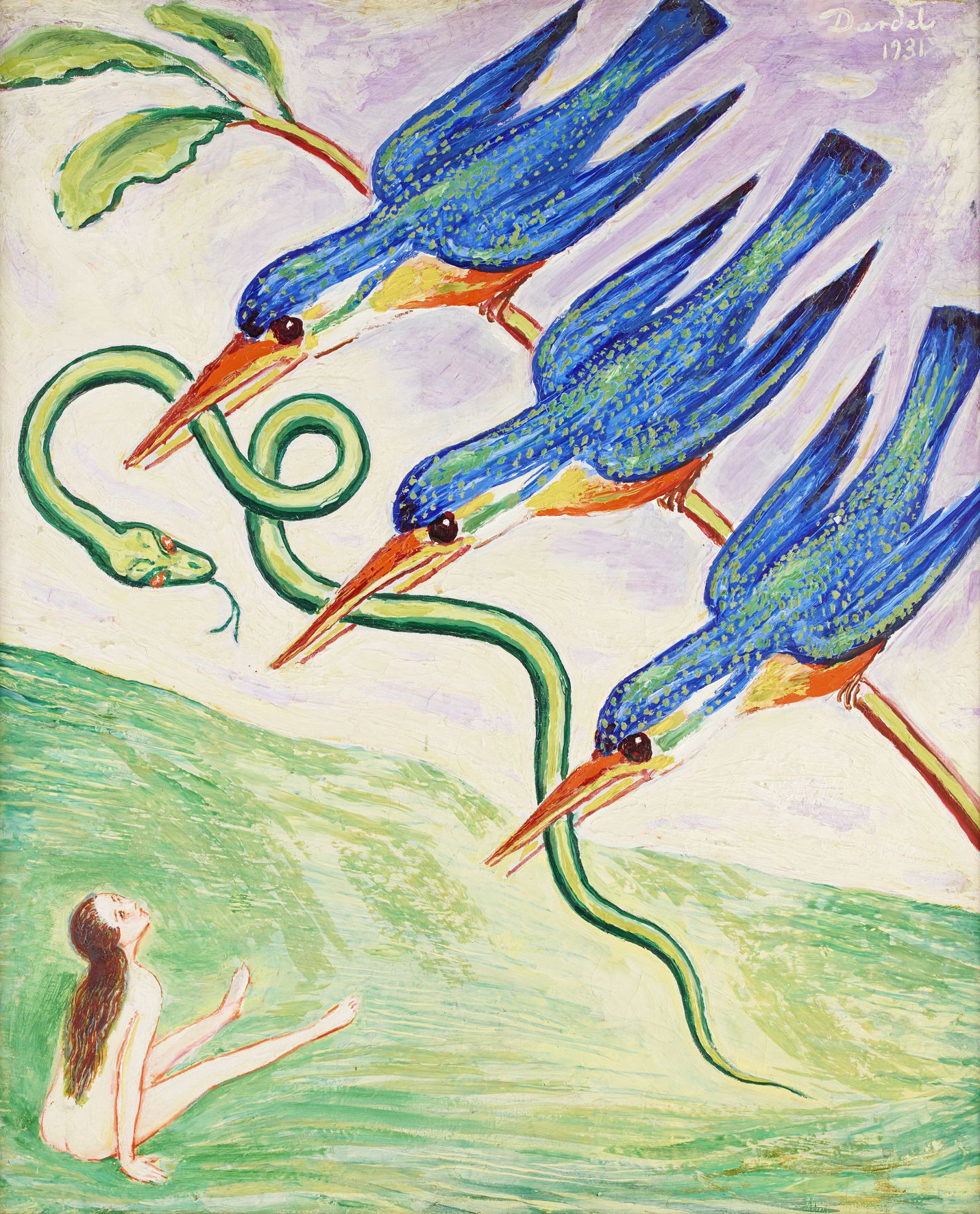
Den bortrövade ormen
ca. 1931

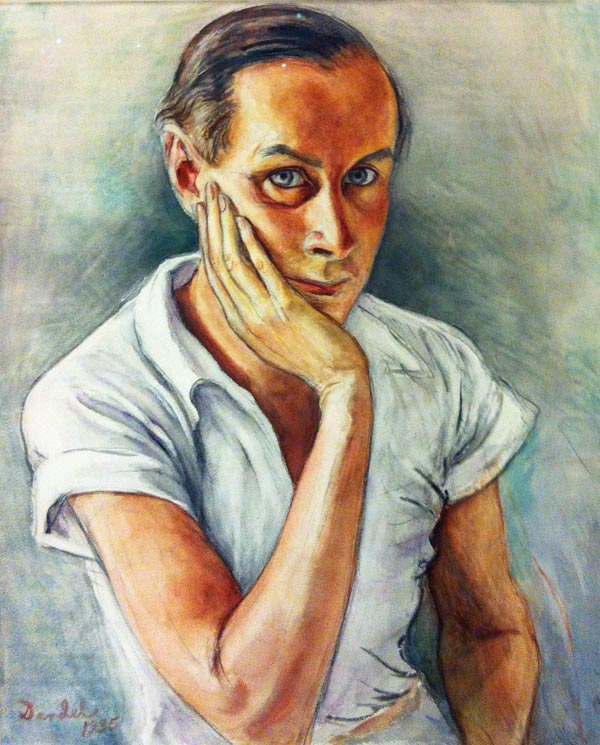
Autoportrait
1935

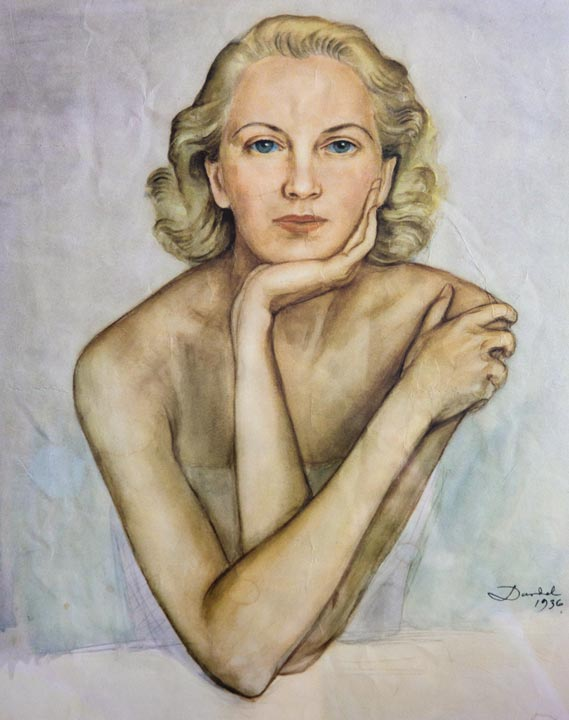
Edita Morris
1936

=== 1940s ===
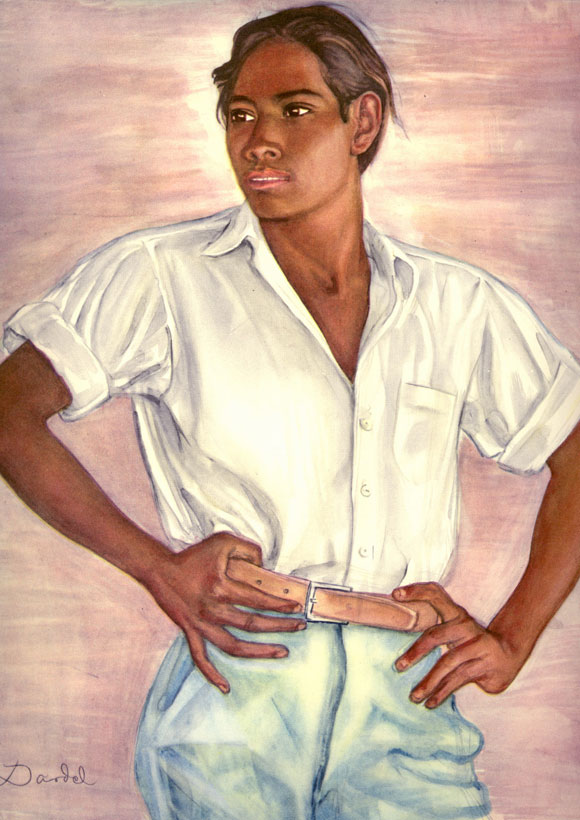
Mexican boy
~1940

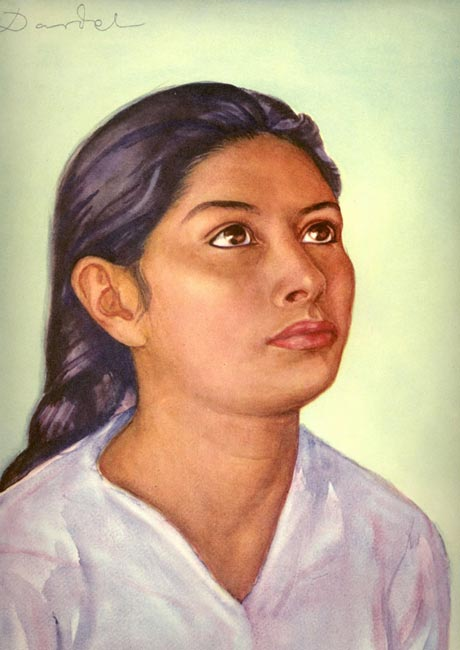
Mexican girl
~1940

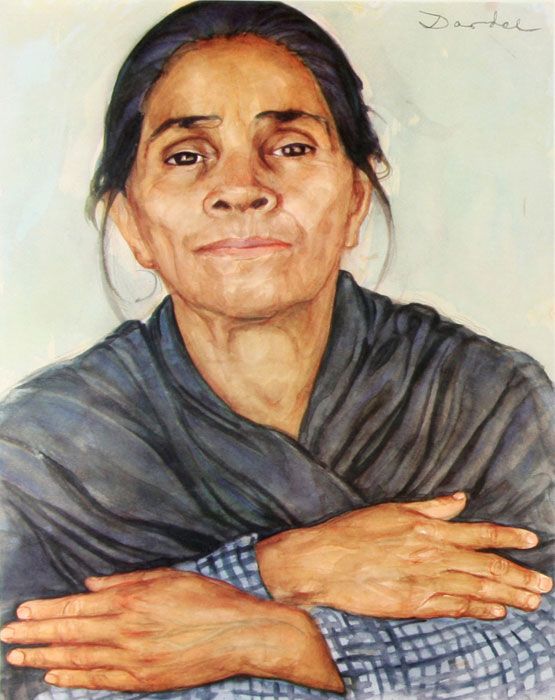
Mexikansk kvinna med korslagda händer
Mexican woman with crossed hands
~1940

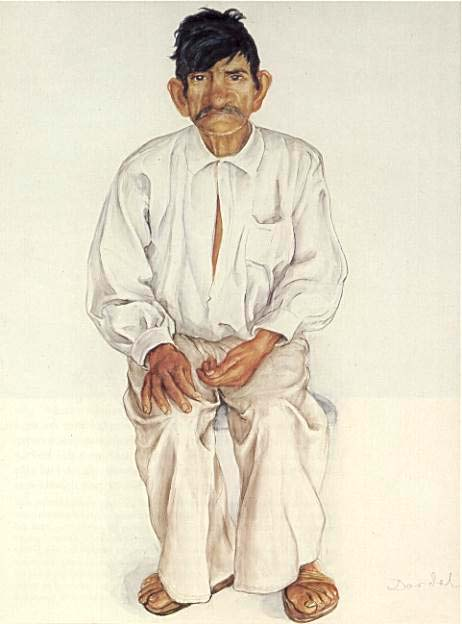
Hustrumördaren
The wife murderer
~1940

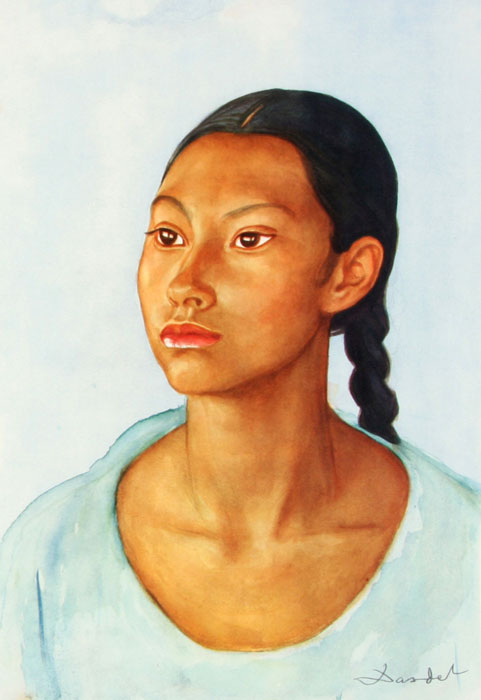
Mexican girl
~1940

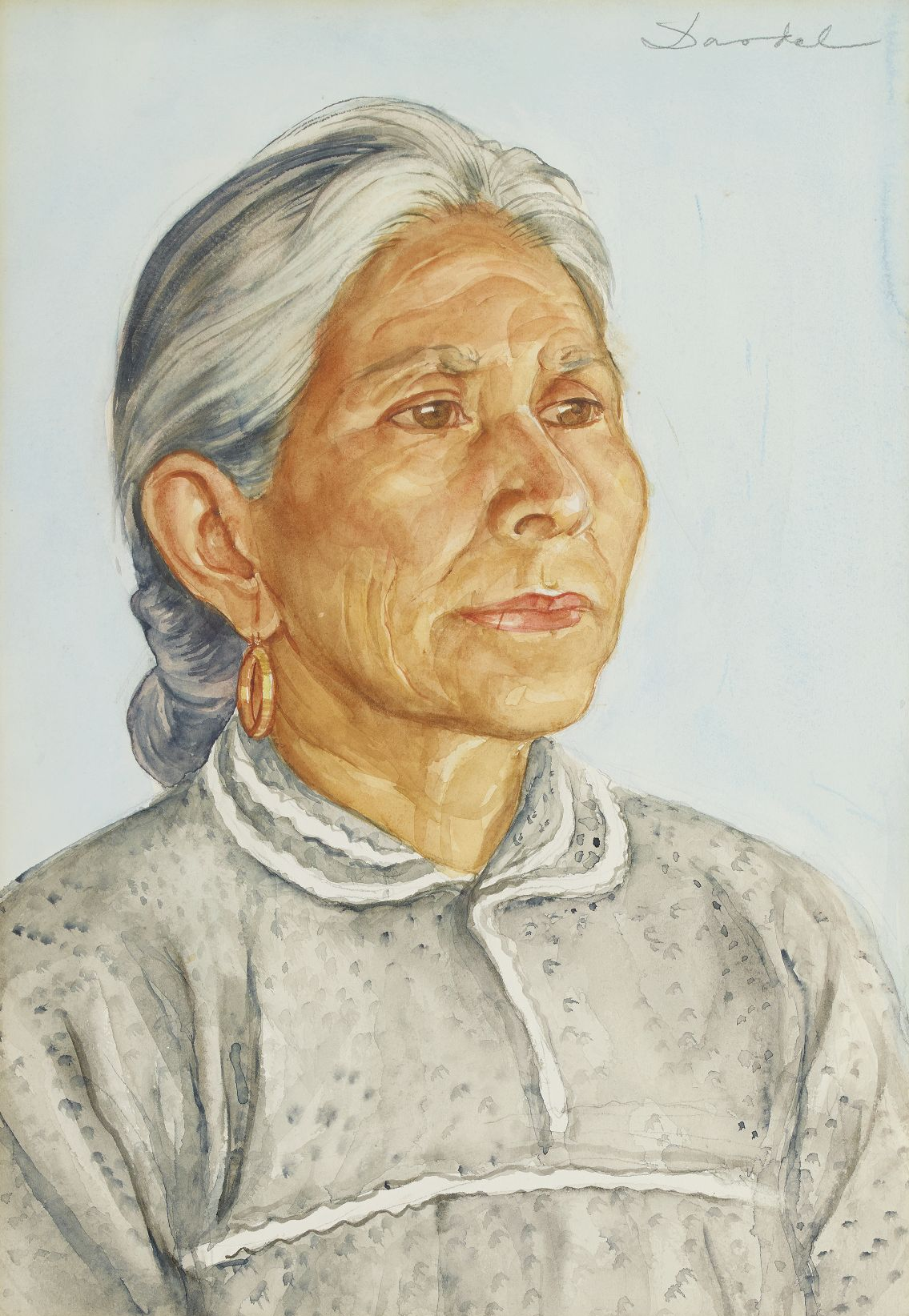
Gammal mexikansk kvinna
Old Mexican lady

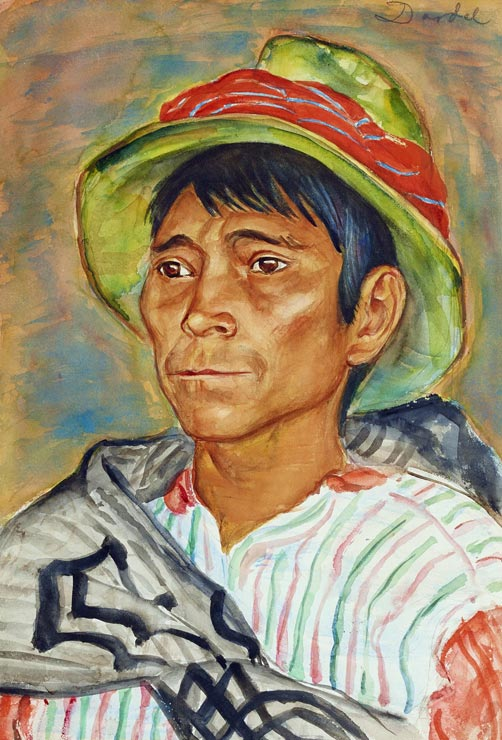
Mexikansk Indian
