= The Dying Dandy =

1918 painting by Nils Dardel

- Den döende dandyn (Swedish)
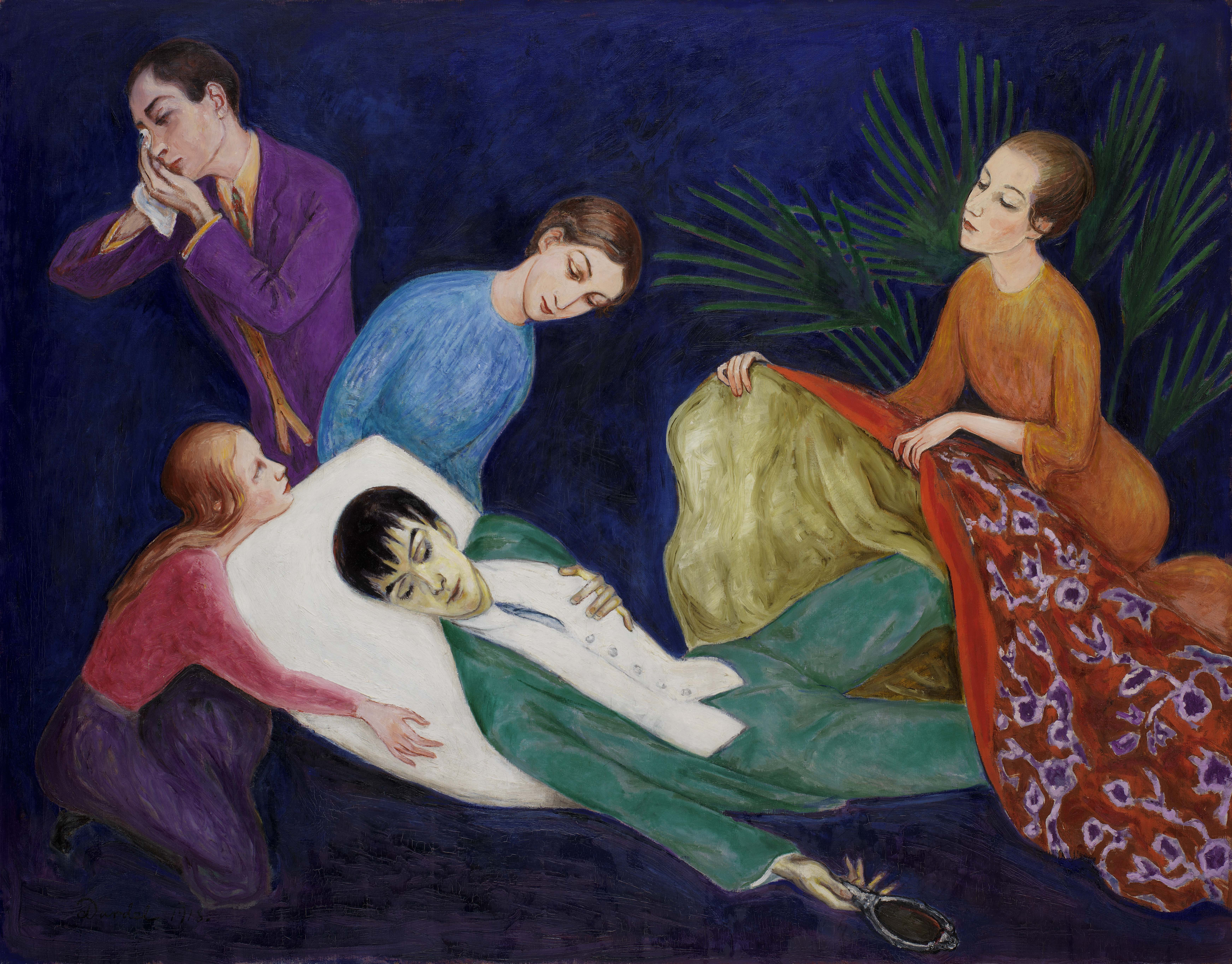
- Artist: Nils Dardel
- Year: 1918
- Medium: oil on canvas
- Location: Moderna Museet; Stockholm

The Dying Dandy (Swedish: Den döende dandyn) is a painting by Nils Dardel, painted in 1918, and today it is part of the collection of Moderna Museet in Stockholm.

The work is characterized by Nils Dardel's use of intense colors and undulating forms, and is considered symbolic of superficial beauty. The form shows the influence of Matisse. Though situated like any deathbed portrait, the dying man is not looking piously towards the heavens, but into a mirror, while surrounded by mourners. A man crying into a handkerchief behind him is looking away while three women attend to the body. The meaning of the blackened mirror is ambiguous; title seems to suggest that the dying man's last thought was for his appearance, possibly meant as a parody of the deathbed portrait as a genre. In an earlier version, the dandy holds a fan and his eyes are completely closed. Dardel was no stranger to this genre and had earlier painted his Funeral in Senlis which shows how elaborate the catafalque could be at the time.

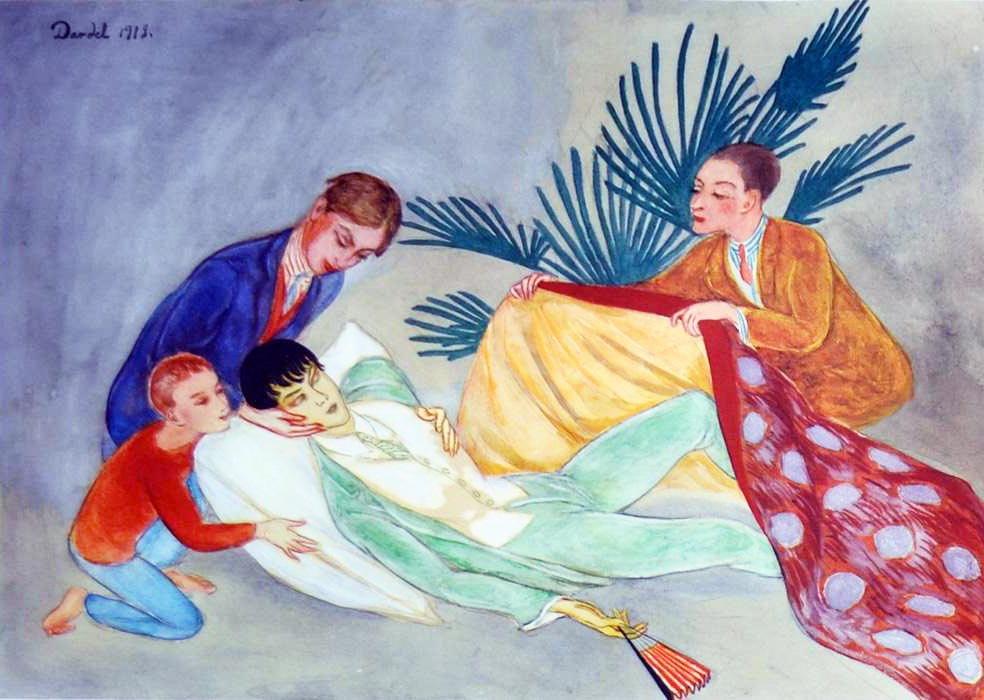
Earlier version, 1918

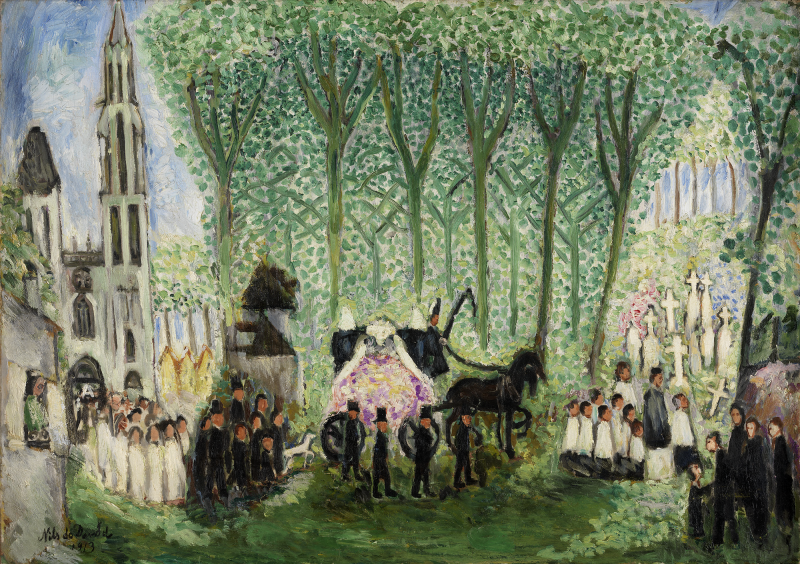
Funeral in Senlis, 1913

== Provenance ==
In 1984 the painting was sold as one of Sweden's most valued works of art and generated much publicity. The high price paid by financier Fredrik Roos at the time has been seen as symptomatic of a capitalist art market. The price paid was 3.4 million kronor and was a record high for a Swedish art. Four years later, in 1988, Roos sold the painting for 13 million kronor, which was again considered to be very high, to the financier Hans Thulin. The painting then ended up in the possession of the financier Thomas Fischer after Thulin went into bankruptcy in 1991. Today it is owned by the Moderna Museet.

On April 4, 2007, a smaller version of the painting in watercolor was sold for 3.25 million kronor to a Swedish collector via auction firm Bukowskis. Dardel's work Vattenfallet (The Waterfall) sold for 25 million kronor in 2012 and was to date the most expensive modernist Swedish painting ever sold.
