= Notyst =

Notyst may refer to the following places in Poland:

- Notyst Dolny
- Notyst Mały
- Notyst Wielki
