= Kozarek =

Kozarek may refer to the following places in Poland:

- Kozarek Mały
- Kozarek Wielki
