= Nové Sady =

Nové Sady may refer to places:

== Czech Republic ==
- Nové Sady (Vyškov District), a municipality and village in the South Moravian Region
- Nové Sady (Žďár nad Sázavou District), a municipality and village in the Vysočina Region
- Nové Sady, a village and part of Horní Štěpánov in the Olomouc Region
- Nové Sady, a city part of Olomouc in the Olomouc Region
- Nové Sady, a village and part of Písečné (Jindřichův Hradec District) in the South Bohemian Region

== Slovakia ==
- Nové Sady, Slovakia

== See also ==
- Nowe Sady (disambiguation)
- Novi Sad
