= Sobiepanka =

Location
- Country: Poland
- Voivodeship: Warmian–Masurian
- County (Powiat): Mrągowo

Physical characteristics
- Source: Lampasz
  - location: east of Borowski Las
  - coordinates: 53°48′14″N 21°11′39″E
- Mouth: Dłużec
  - location: Borowe
  - coordinates: 53°46′54″N 21°13′28″E
- Length: 1.5 km (0.93 mi)

Sobiepanka is a short river of Poland, a connection between the lakes Lampasz, Kujno and Dłużec.
