= Kulinowo =

- Settlement
- Location within Poland
- Coordinates: 53°46′30″N 21°35′06″E
- Country: Poland
- Voivodeship: Warmian-Masurian
- County: Mrągowo
- Gmina: Mikołajki

Kulinowo [kuliˈnɔvɔ] is a settlement in the administrative district of Gmina Mikołajki, within Mrągowo County, Warmian-Masurian Voivodeship, in northern Poland.
