= Wilamówko, Mrągowo County =

Wilamówko
- Village
- Location within Poland
- Coordinates: 53°48′39″N 21°06′57″E
- Country: Poland
- Voivodeship: Warmian-Masurian
- County: Mrągowo
- Gmina: Sorkwity

Wilamówko [vilaˈmufkɔ] is a village in the administrative district of Gmina Sorkwity, within Mrągowo County, Warmian-Masurian Voivodeship, in northern Poland.
