= Sady, Warmian-Masurian Voivodeship =

Sady
- Village
- Location within Poland
- Coordinates: 53°51′N 21°33′E
- Country: Poland
- Voivodeship: Warmian-Masurian
- County: Mrągowo
- Gmina: Mikołajki

Sady [ˈsadɨ] is a village in the administrative district of Gmina Mikołajki, within Mrągowo County, Warmian-Masurian Voivodeship, in northern Poland.
