= Cimowo =

- Settlement
- Location within Poland
- Coordinates: 53°49′42″N 21°31′14″E
- Country: Poland
- Voivodeship: Warmian-Masurian
- County: Mrągowo
- Gmina: Mikołajki

Cimowo [t͡ɕiˈmɔvɔ] is a settlement in the administrative district of Gmina Mikołajki, within Mrągowo County, Warmian-Masurian Voivodeship, in northern Poland.
