= Wólka Bagnowska =

- Village
- Location within Poland
- Coordinates: 53°49′45″N 21°12′57″E
- Country: Poland
- Voivodeship: Warmian-Masurian
- County: Mrągowo
- Gmina: Mrągowo
- Population: 80

Wólka Bagnowska [ˈvulka baɡˈnɔfska] is a village in the administrative district of Gmina Mrągowo, within Mrągowo County, Warmian-Masurian Voivodeship, in northern Poland.
