= Georgenthal (disambiguation) =

Georgenthal is a municipality in Germany.

Georgenthal may also refer to:

Places in the Czech Republic

- Sankt Georgenthal, German name of the Czech city Jiřetín pod Jedlovou
- Obergeorgenthal, German name for the Czech municipality Horní Jiřetín

Places in Poland

- Georgenthal, German name for the Polish village Jurki, Ostróda County
- Georgental, German name for the Polish settlement of Urwitałt

== See also ==
- Český Jiřetín, known in German as Georgendorf
