= Użranki =

- Village
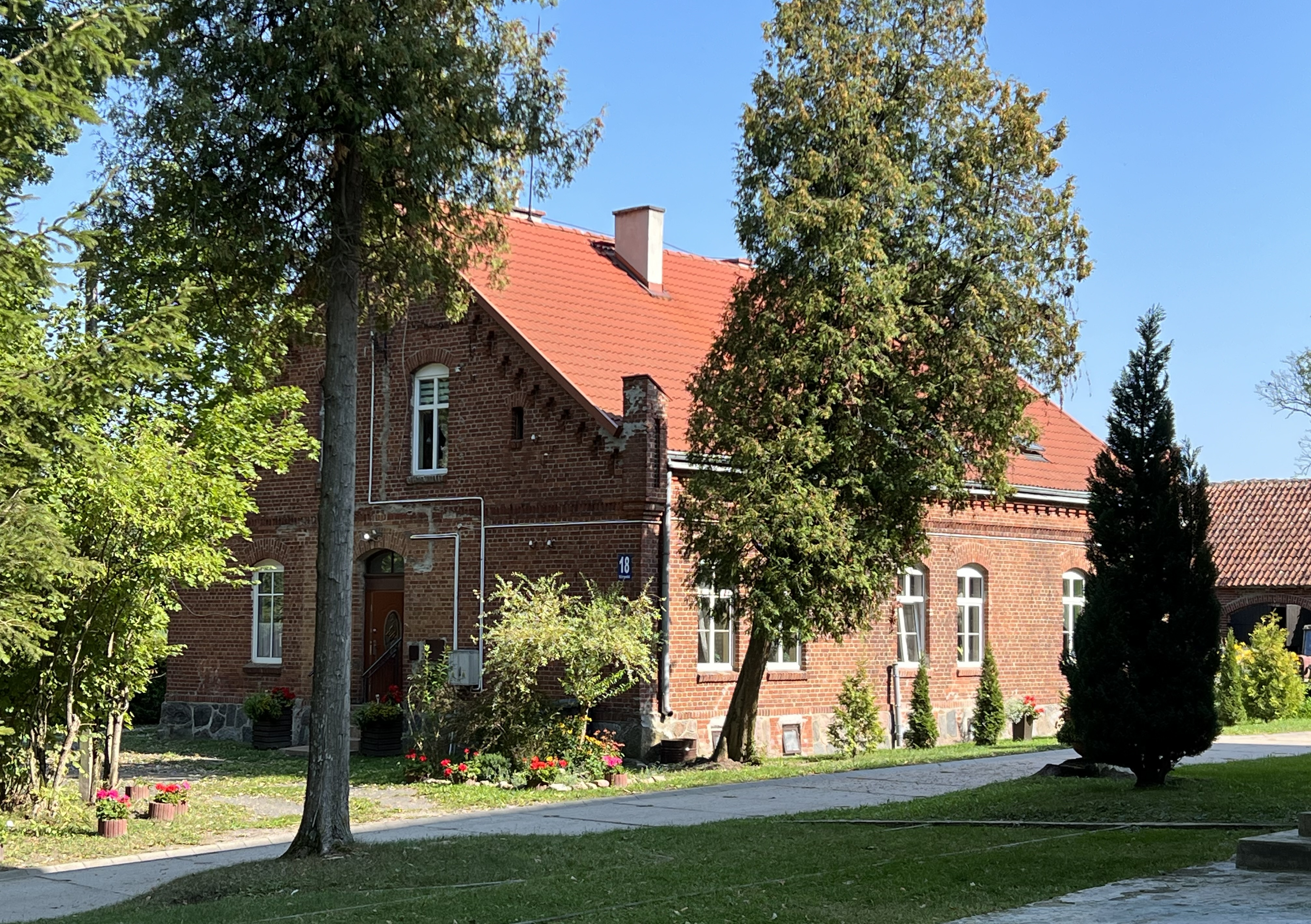
- Lutheran chapel in Użranki

- Location within Poland
- Coordinates: 53°53′N 21°26′E
- Country: Poland
- Voivodeship: Warmian-Masurian
- County: Mrągowo
- Gmina: Mrągowo

Użranki [uˈʐranki] is a village in the administrative district of Gmina Mrągowo, within Mrągowo County, Warmian-Masurian Voivodeship, in northern Poland.
