= Rydwągi =

- Village
- Location within Poland
- Coordinates: 53°58′N 21°18′E
- Country: Poland
- Voivodeship: Warmian-Masurian
- County: Mrągowo
- Gmina: Mrągowo

Rydwągi [rɨdˈvɔnɡi] is a village in the administrative district of Gmina Mrągowo, within Mrągowo County, Warmian-Masurian Voivodeship, in northern Poland.
