= Młynik, Warmian-Masurian Voivodeship =

Młynik
- Village
- Location within Poland
- Coordinates: 53°52′7″N 21°10′30″E
- Country: Poland
- Voivodeship: Warmian-Masurian
- County: Mrągowo
- Gmina: Sorkwity
- Population: 31

Młynik [ˈmwɨnik] is a village in the administrative district of Gmina Sorkwity, within Mrągowo County, Warmian-Masurian Voivodeship, in northern Poland.
