= Młynowo, Mrągowo County =

Młynowo
- Village
- Location within Poland
- Coordinates: 53°53′N 21°19′E
- Country: Poland
- Voivodeship: Warmian-Masurian
- County: Mrągowo
- Gmina: Mrągowo

Młynowo [mwɨˈnɔvɔ] is a village in the administrative district of Gmina Mrągowo, within Mrągowo County, Warmian-Masurian Voivodeship, in northern Poland.
