= Prawdowo =

- Village
- Location within Poland
- Coordinates: 53°48′N 21°34′E
- Country: Poland
- Voivodeship: Warmian-Masurian
- County: Mrągowo
- Gmina: Mikołajki

Prawdowo [pravˈdɔvɔ] is a village in the administrative district of Gmina Mikołajki, within Mrągowo County, Warmian-Masurian Voivodeship, in northern Poland.
