= Lelek, Warmian-Masurian Voivodeship =

Lelek
- Settlement
- Location within Poland
- Coordinates: 53°51′46″N 21°35′47″E
- Country: Poland
- Voivodeship: Warmian-Masurian
- County: Mrągowo
- Gmina: Mikołajki

Lelek [ˈlɛlɛk] is a settlement in the administrative district of Gmina Mikołajki, within Mrągowo County, Warmian-Masurian Voivodeship, in northern Poland.
