= Stawek, Warmian-Masurian Voivodeship =

Stawek
- Settlement
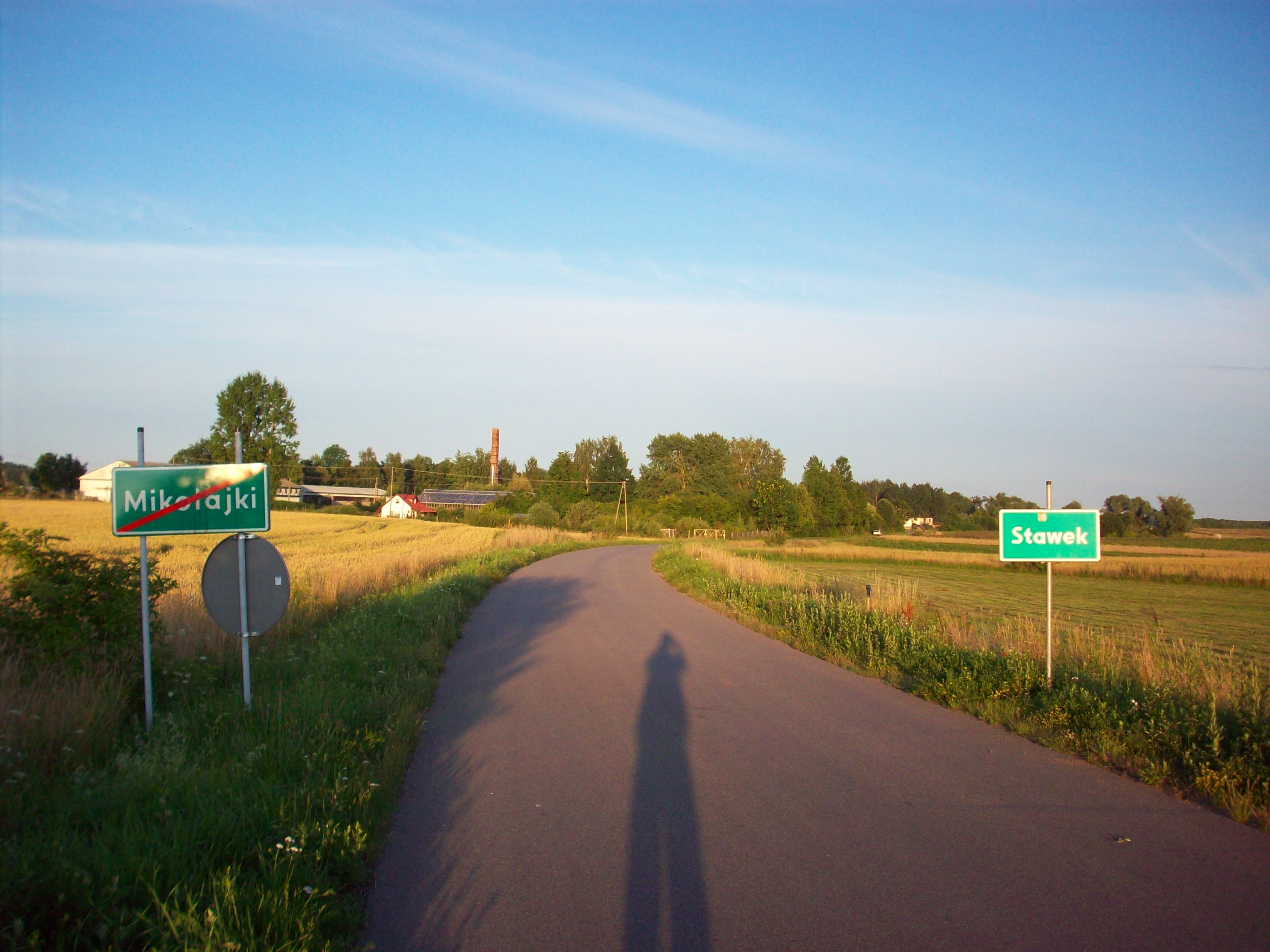

- Location within Poland
- Coordinates: 53°47′19″N 21°36′13″E
- Country: Poland
- Voivodeship: Warmian-Masurian
- County: Mrągowo
- Gmina: Mikołajki

Stawek [ˈstavɛk] is a settlement in the administrative district of Gmina Mikołajki, within Mrągowo County, Warmian-Masurian Voivodeship, in northern Poland.
