= Osa, Warmian-Masurian Voivodeship =

Osa
- Village
- Location within Poland
- Coordinates: 53°49′7″N 21°39′6″E
- Country: Poland
- Voivodeship: Warmian-Masurian
- County: Mrągowo
- Gmina: Mikołajki
- Time zone: UTC+1 (CET)
  - Summer (DST): UTC+2 (CEST)
- Postal code: 11-730
- ISO 3166 code: POL
- Vehicle registration: NMR

Osa [ˈɔsa] is a village in northern Poland, in the administrative district of Gmina Mikołajki, within Mrągowo County, Warmian-Masurian Voivodeship.
