= Jędrychowo, Mrągowo County =

Jędrychowo
- Village
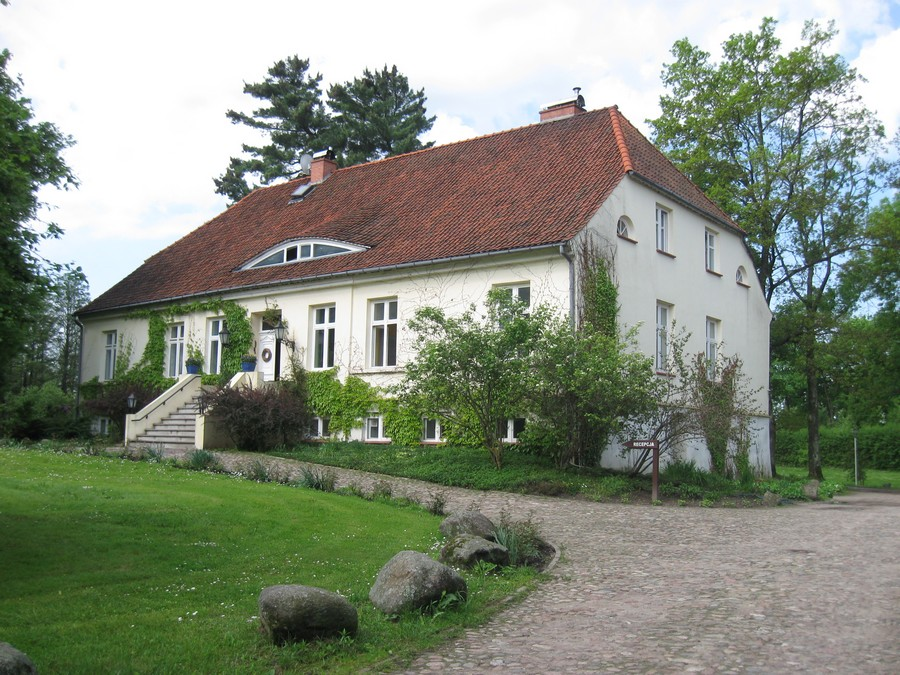

- Location within Poland
- Coordinates: 53°49′23″N 21°10′02″E
- Country: Poland
- Voivodeship: Warmian-Masurian
- County: Mrągowo
- Gmina: Sorkwity
- Population: 160

Jędrychowo [jɛndrɨˈxɔvɔ] is a village in the administrative district of Gmina Sorkwity, within Mrągowo County, Warmian-Masurian Voivodeship, in northern Poland.
