= Marcinkowo, Mrągowo County =

Marcinkowo
- Village
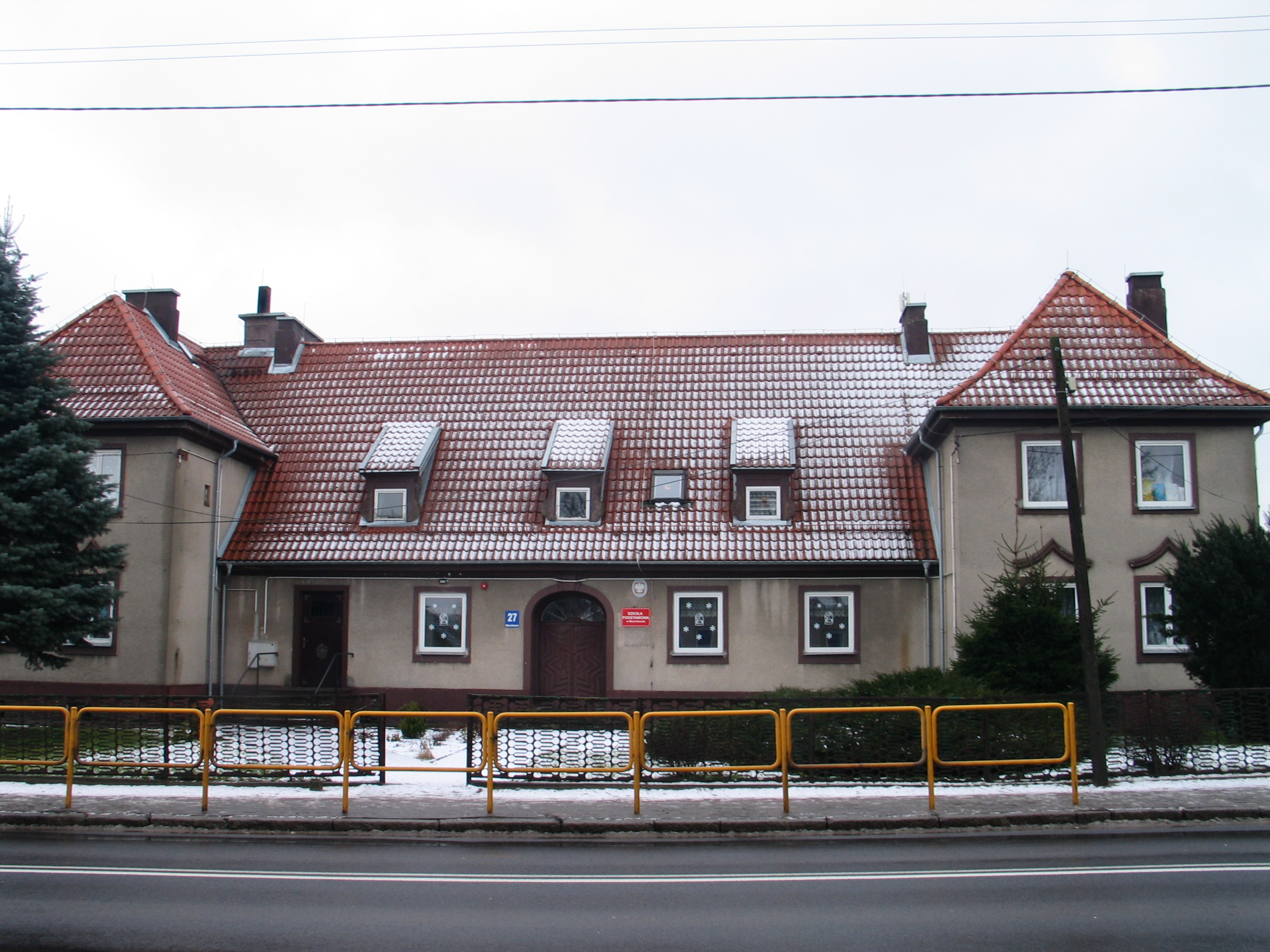
- The school building in Marcinkowo

- Location within Poland
- Coordinates: 53°51′33″N 21°16′14″E
- Country: Poland
- Voivodeship: Warmian-Masurian
- County: Mrągowo
- Gmina: Mrągowo
- Population: 764

Marcinkowo [mart͡ɕinˈkɔvɔ] is a village in the administrative district of Gmina Mrągowo, Poland within Mrągowo County, Warmian-Masurian Voivodeship, in northern Poland.
