= Muntowo =

- Village
- Location within Poland
- Coordinates: 53°54′N 21°22′E
- Country: Poland
- Voivodeship: Warmian-Masurian
- County: Mrągowo
- Gmina: Mrągowo

Muntowo [munˈtɔvɔ] is a village in the administrative district of Gmina Mrągowo, within Mrągowo County, Warmian-Masurian Voivodeship, in northern Poland.

== Notable residents ==
- Paul Ogorzow (1912–1941), Berlin's S-Bahn murderer
