= Janiszewo, Warmian-Masurian Voivodeship =

Janiszewo
- Settlement
- Location within Poland
- Coordinates: 53°52′35″N 21°6′20″E
- Country: Poland
- Voivodeship: Warmian-Masurian
- County: Mrągowo
- Gmina: Sorkwity
- Population: 154

Janiszewo [janiˈʂɛvɔ] is a settlement in the administrative district of Gmina Sorkwity, within Mrągowo County, Warmian-Masurian Voivodeship, in northern Poland.
