= Janowo, Mrągowo County =

Janowo
- Village
- Location within Poland
- Coordinates: 53°50′1″N 21°12′8″E
- Country: Poland
- Voivodeship: Warmian-Masurian
- County: Mrągowo
- Gmina: Sorkwity

Janowo [jaˈnɔvɔ] is a village in the administrative district of Gmina Sorkwity, within Mrągowo County, Warmian-Masurian Voivodeship, in northern Poland.
