= Głodowo, Mrągowo County =

Głodowo
- Settlement
- Location within Poland
- Coordinates: 53°49′13″N 21°9′2″E
- Country: Poland
- Voivodeship: Warmian-Masurian
- County: Mrągowo
- Gmina: Sorkwity

Głodowo [ɡwɔˈdɔvɔ] is a settlement in the administrative district of Gmina Sorkwity, within Mrągowo County, Warmian-Masurian Voivodeship, in northern Poland.
