= Maradzki Chojniak =

- Settlement
- Location within Poland
- Coordinates: 53°49′0″N 21°9′3″E
- Country: Poland
- Voivodeship: Warmian-Masurian
- County: Mrągowo
- Gmina: Sorkwity

Maradzki Chojniak [maˈrat͡ski ˈxɔi̯ɲak] is a settlement in the administrative district of Gmina Sorkwity, within Mrągowo County, Warmian-Masurian Voivodeship, in northern Poland.
