= Zawada, Mrągowo County =

Zawada
- Village
- Location within Poland
- Coordinates: 53°50′52″N 21°23′1″E
- Country: Poland
- Voivodeship: Warmian-Masurian
- County: Mrągowo
- Gmina: Mrągowo
- Population: 40

Zawada [zaˈvada] is a village in the administrative district of Gmina Mrągowo, within Mrągowo County, Warmian-Masurian Voivodeship, in northern Poland.
