= Wymysły, Warmian-Masurian Voivodeship =

Wymysły
- Settlement
- Location within Poland
- Coordinates: 53°54′14″N 21°18′42″E
- Country: Poland
- Voivodeship: Warmian-Masurian
- County: Mrągowo
- Gmina: Mrągowo

Wymysły [vɨˈmɨswɨ] is a settlement in the administrative district of Gmina Mrągowo, within Mrągowo County, Warmian-Masurian Voivodeship, in northern Poland.
