= Olszewo, Mrągowo County =

Olszewo
- Village
- Location within Poland
- Coordinates: 53°51′38″N 21°40′36″E
- Country: Poland
- Voivodeship: Warmian-Masurian
- County: Mrągowo
- Gmina: Mikołajki
- Founded: 1545
- Founder: Grzegorz Monik

Population
  - Total: 440
- Time zone: UTC+1 (CET)
  - Summer (DST): UTC+2 (CEST)
- Vehicle registration: NMR

Olszewo [ɔlˈʂɛvɔ] is a village in the administrative district of Gmina Mikołajki, within Mrągowo County, Warmian-Masurian Voivodeship, in northern Poland. It is located in Masuria.

== History ==
The village was founded as Zawady in 1545 by Grzegorz Monik. By 1565, it was renamed to Olszewo.
