= Lembruk =

- Village
- Location within Poland
- Coordinates: 53°57′27″N 21°14′46″E
- Country: Poland
- Voivodeship: Warmian-Masurian
- County: Mrągowo
- Gmina: Mrągowo
- Population: 230

Lembruk [ˈlɛmbruk] is a village in the administrative district of Gmina Mrągowo, within Mrągowo County, Warmian-Masurian Voivodeship, in northern Poland.
