= Zamkowo =

- Settlement
- Location within Poland
- Coordinates: 53°54′16″N 21°11′17″E
- Country: Poland
- Voivodeship: Warmian-Masurian
- County: Mrągowo
- Gmina: Sorkwity

Zamkowo [zamˈkɔvɔ] is a settlement in the administrative district of Gmina Sorkwity, within Mrągowo County, Warmian-Masurian Voivodeship, in northern Poland.
