= Piotrówka, Warmian-Masurian Voivodeship =

Piotrówka
- Settlement
- Location within Poland
- Coordinates: 53°52′29″N 21°21′32″E
- Country: Poland
- Voivodeship: Warmian-Masurian
- County: Mrągowo
- Gmina: Mrągowo

Piotrówka [pjɔˈtrufka] is a settlement in the administrative district of Gmina Mrągowo, within Mrągowo County, Warmian-Masurian Voivodeship, in northern Poland.
