= Lesiny, Mrągowo County =

Lesiny
- Settlement
- Location within Poland
- Coordinates: 53°43′49″N 21°09′59″E
- Country: Poland
- Voivodeship: Warmian-Masurian
- County: Mrągowo
- Gmina: Sorkwity
- Population: 4

Lesiny [lɛˈɕinɨ] is a settlement in the administrative district of Gmina Sorkwity, within Mrągowo County, Warmian-Masurian Voivodeship, in northern Poland.
