= Tymnikowo =

- Settlement
- Location within Poland
- Coordinates: 53°52′03″N 21°20′44″E
- Country: Poland
- Voivodeship: Warmian-Masurian
- County: Mrągowo
- Gmina: Mrągowo

Tymnikowo [tɨmniˈkɔvɔ] is a settlement in the administrative district of Gmina Mrągowo, within Mrągowo County, Warmian-Masurian Voivodeship, in northern Poland.
