= Rybno, Mrągowo County =

Rybno
- Village
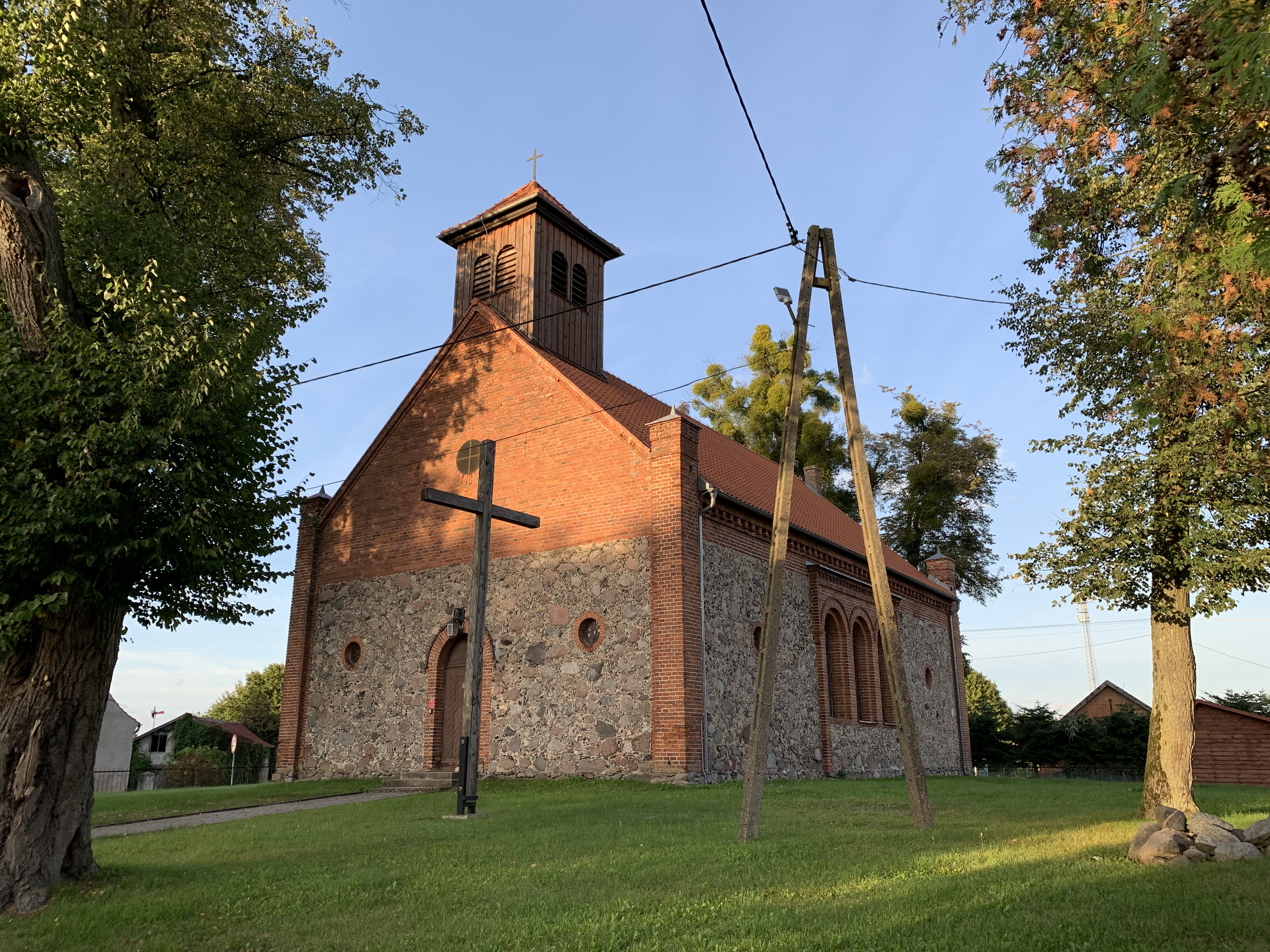
- Lutheran church

- Location within Poland
- Coordinates: 53°46′N 21°8′E
- Country: Poland
- Voivodeship: Warmian-Masurian
- County: Mrągowo
- Gmina: Sorkwity

Population
  - Total: 440

Rybno [ˈrɨbnɔ] is a village in the administrative district of Gmina Sorkwity, within Mrągowo County, Warmian-Masurian Voivodeship, in northern Poland.
