= Załuki, Warmian-Masurian Voivodeship =

Załuki
- Settlement
- Location within Poland
- Coordinates: 53°50′21″N 21°10′54″E
- Country: Poland
- Voivodeship: Warmian-Masurian
- County: Mrągowo
- Gmina: Sorkwity

Załuki [zaˈwuki] is a settlement in the administrative district of Gmina Sorkwity, within Mrągowo County, Warmian-Masurian Voivodeship, in northern Poland.
