= Śniadowo, Warmian-Masurian Voivodeship =

Śniadowo
- Settlement
- Location within Poland
- Coordinates: 53°51′56″N 21°22′35″E
- Country: Poland
- Voivodeship: Warmian-Masurian
- County: Mrągowo
- Gmina: Mrągowo
- Population: 30

Śniadowo [ɕɲaˈdɔvɔ] is a settlement in the administrative district of Gmina Mrągowo, within Mrągowo County, Warmian-Masurian Voivodeship, in northern Poland.
