= Borowski Las =

- Village
- Location within Poland
- Coordinates: 53°48′N 21°11′E
- Country: Poland
- Voivodeship: Warmian-Masurian
- County: Mrągowo
- Gmina: Sorkwity
- Population: 60

Borowski Las (Polish pronunciation: [bɔˈrɔfskʲi ˈlas]) is a village in the administrative district of Gmina Sorkwity, within Mrągowo County, Warmian-Masurian Voivodeship, in northern Poland.

Lake Lampackie and the river Sobiepanka are located near the village.
