= Johann Eichhorn =

Johann Eichhorn may refer to:

- Johann Gottfried Eichhorn, German Protestant theologian
- Johann Eichhorn (serial killer), German serial killer and rapist
