= Faszcze, Warmian-Masurian Voivodeship =

Faszcze
- Village
- Location within Poland
- Coordinates: 53°50′N 21°30′E
- Country: Poland
- Voivodeship: Warmian-Masurian
- County: Mrągowo
- Gmina: Mikołajki

Faszcze [ˈfaʂt͡ʂɛ] is a village in the administrative district of Gmina Mikołajki, within Mrągowo County, Warmian-Masurian Voivodeship, in northern Poland.
