= Lisunie =

- Settlement
- Location within Poland
- Coordinates: 53°47′N 21°31′E
- Country: Poland
- Voivodeship: Warmian-Masurian
- County: Mrągowo
- Gmina: Mikołajki

Lisunie [liˈsuɲɛ] is a settlement in the administrative district of Gmina Mikołajki, within Mrągowo County, Warmian-Masurian Voivodeship, in northern Poland.
