= Dybowo, Mrągowo County =

Dybowo
- Settlement
- Location within Poland
- Coordinates: 53°46′38″N 21°36′47″E
- Country: Poland
- Voivodeship: Warmian-Masurian
- County: Mrągowo
- Gmina: Mikołajki
- Population: 30

Dybowo [dɨˈbɔvɔ] is a settlement in the administrative district of Gmina Mikołajki, within Mrągowo County, Warmian-Masurian Voivodeship, in northern Poland.
