= Szestno =

- Village
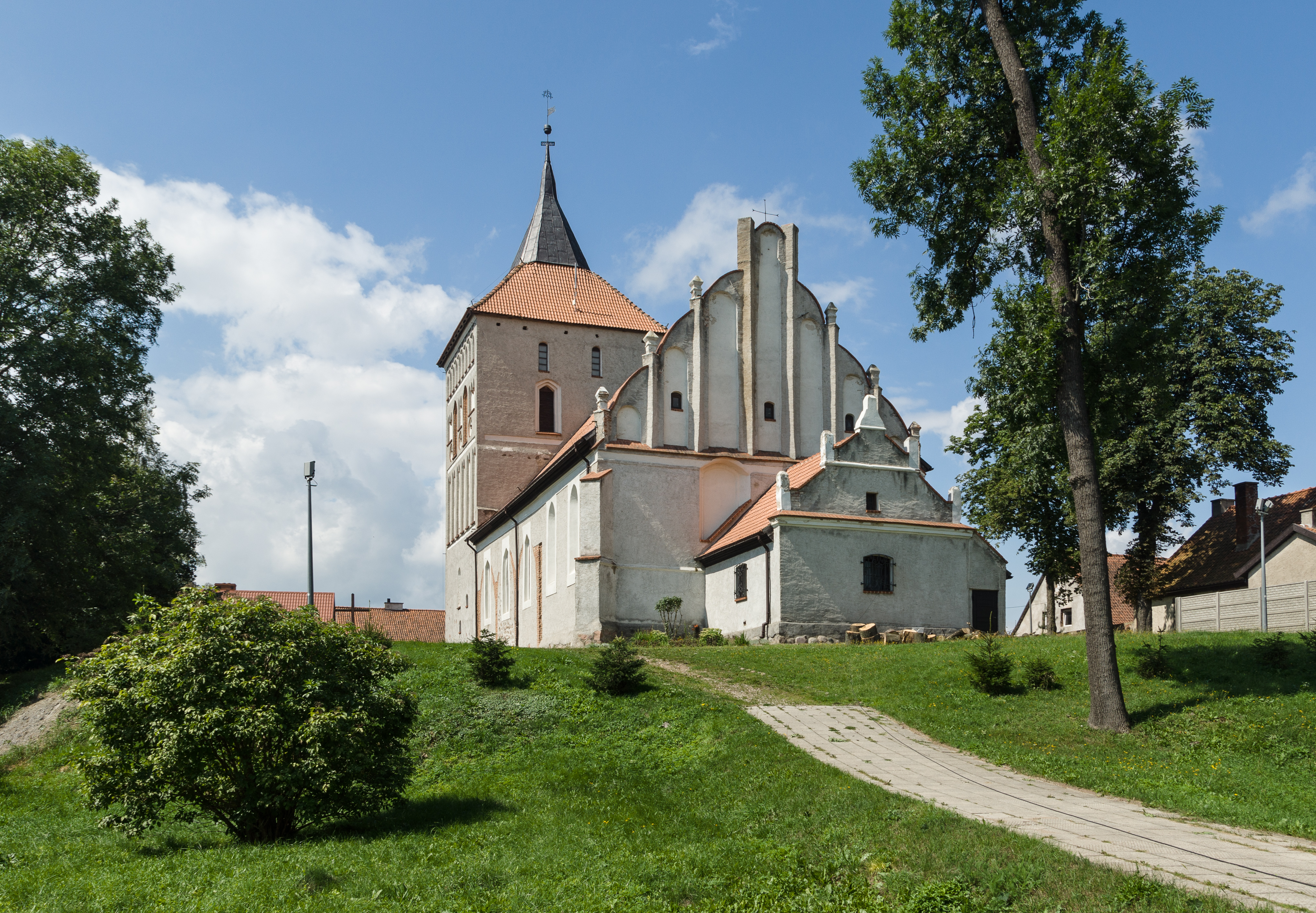
- Holy Cross church in Szestno

- Location within Poland
- Coordinates: 53°56′N 21°18′E
- Country: Poland
- Voivodeship: Warmian-Masurian
- County: Mrągowo
- Gmina: Mrągowo
- Population: 830
- Website: http://szestno.republika.pl/

Szestno [ˈʂɛstnɔ] is a village in the administrative district of Gmina Mrągowo, within Mrągowo County, Warmian-Masurian Voivodeship, in northern Poland.
