= Pełkowo =

- Settlement
- Location within Poland
- Coordinates: 53°52′17″N 21°23′40″E
- Country: Poland
- Voivodeship: Warmian-Masurian
- County: Mrągowo
- Gmina: Mrągowo
- Time zone: UTC+1 (CET)
  - Summer (DST): UTC+2 (CEST)
- Vehicle registration: NMR

Pełkowo [pɛu̯ˈkɔvɔ] is a settlement in the administrative district of Gmina Mrągowo, within Mrągowo County, Warmian-Masurian Voivodeship, in northern Poland.
