= Probark =

- Village
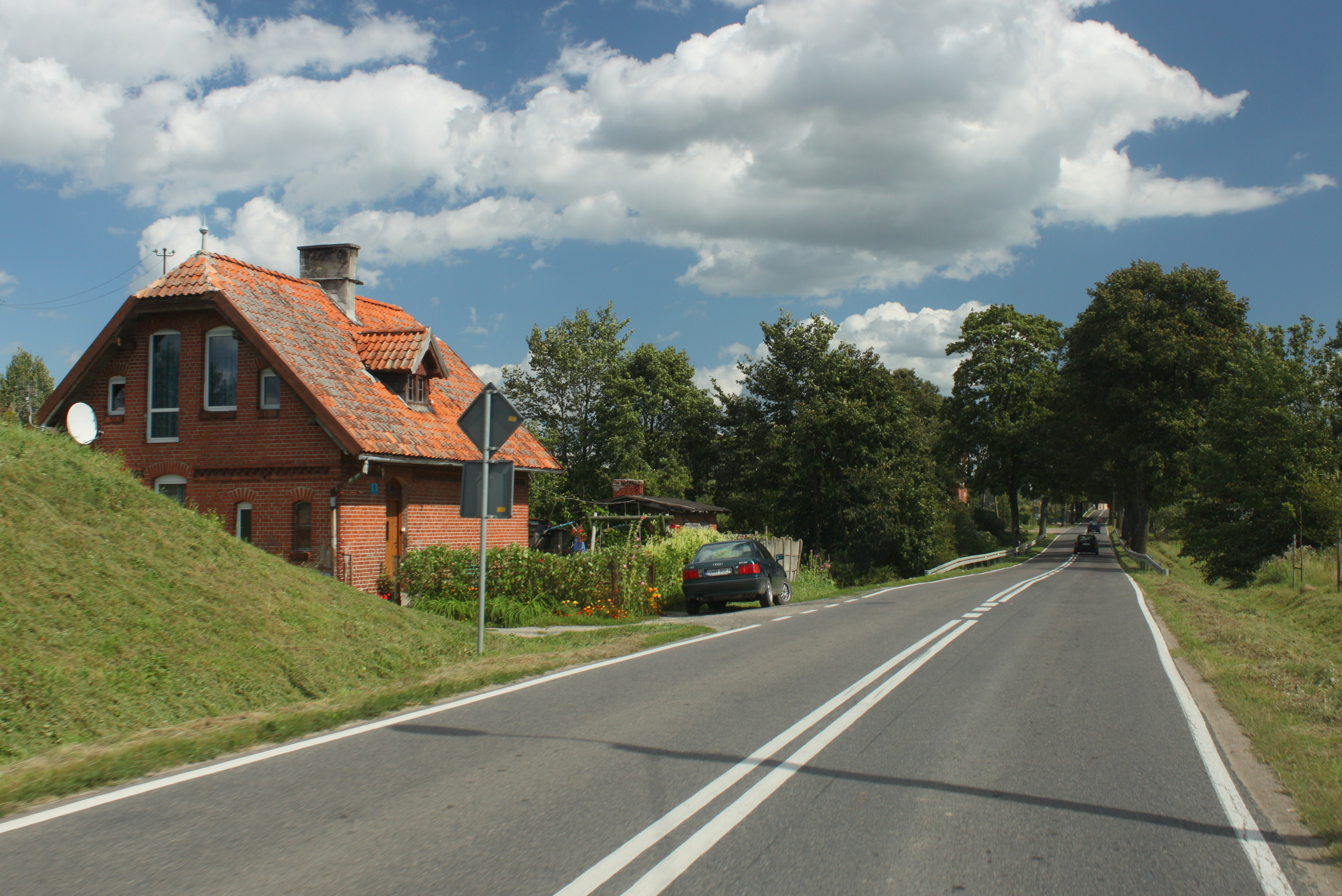

- Location within Poland
- Coordinates: 53°50′N 21°22′E
- Country: Poland
- Voivodeship: Warmian-Masurian
- County: Mrągowo
- Gmina: Mrągowo
- Population: 20
- Time zone: UTC+1 (CET)
  - Summer (DST): UTC+2 (CEST)
- Postal code: 11-700

Probark [ˈprɔbark] (German: Proberg) is a village in the administrative district of Gmina Mrągowo, within Mrągowo County, Warmian-Masurian Voivodeship, in northern Poland.

The village had a population of 20 in 2006.

In 1825, the village of Nowy Probark was separated from Probark.
