= Kucze, Mrągowo County =

Kucze
- Settlement
- Location within Poland
- Coordinates: 53°49′08″N 21°24′47″E
- Country: Poland
- Voivodeship: Warmian-Masurian
- County: Mrągowo
- Gmina: Mrągowo

Kucze [ˈkut͡ʂɛ] is a settlement in the administrative district of Gmina Mrągowo, within Mrągowo County, Warmian-Masurian Voivodeship, in northern Poland.
