= Miejski Las =

- Settlement
- Location within Poland
- Coordinates: 53°50′27″N 21°20′30″E
- Country: Poland
- Voivodeship: Warmian-Masurian
- County: Mrągowo
- Gmina: Mrągowo
- Population: 30

Miejski Las [ˈmjɛi̯ski ˈlas] is a settlement in the administrative district of Gmina Mrągowo, within Mrągowo County, Warmian-Masurian Voivodeship, in northern Poland.
