= Słomowo, Warmian-Masurian Voivodeship =

Słomowo
- Village
- Location within Poland
- Coordinates: 53°51′N 21°11′E
- Country: Poland
- Voivodeship: Warmian-Masurian
- County: Mrągowo
- Gmina: Sorkwity

Słomowo [swɔˈmɔvɔ] is a village in the administrative district of Gmina Sorkwity, within Mrągowo County, Warmian-Masurian Voivodeship, in northern Poland.
