= Szarłaty =

- Village
- Location within Poland
- Coordinates: 53°49′10″N 21°6′45″E
- Country: Poland
- Voivodeship: Warmian-Masurian
- County: Mrągowo
- Gmina: Sorkwity

Szarłaty [ʂarˈwatɨ] is a village in the administrative district of Gmina Sorkwity, within Mrągowo County, Warmian-Masurian Voivodeship, in northern Poland.
