= Lisiny, Warmian-Masurian Voivodeship =

Lisiny
- Village
- Location within Poland
- Coordinates: 53°46′40″N 21°28′52″E
- Country: Poland
- Voivodeship: Warmian-Masurian
- County: Mrągowo
- Gmina: Mikołajki

Lisiny [liˈɕinɨ] is a village in the administrative district of Gmina Mikołajki, within Mrągowo County, Warmian-Masurian Voivodeship, in northern Poland.
