= Wola Maradzka =

- Village
- Location within Poland
- Coordinates: 53°47′23″N 21°10′13″E
- Country: Poland
- Voivodeship: Warmian-Masurian
- County: Mrągowo
- Gmina: Sorkwity

Wola Maradzka [ˈvɔla maˈrat͡ska] is a village in the administrative district of Gmina Sorkwity, within Mrągowo County, Warmian-Masurian Voivodeship, in northern Poland.
