= Ruska Wieś, Mrągowo County =

Ruska Wieś
- Village
- Location within Poland
- Coordinates: 53°57′N 21°20′E
- Country: Poland
- Voivodeship: Warmian-Masurian
- County: Mrągowo
- Gmina: Mrągowo
- Time zone: UTC+1 (CET)
  - Summer (DST): UTC+2 (CEST)
- Vehicle registration: NMR

Ruska Wieś [ˈruska ˈvjɛɕ] is a village in the administrative district of Gmina Mrągowo, within Mrągowo County, Warmian-Masurian Voivodeship, in northern Poland. It is located in Masuria.

As of 1536 the population was almost entirely Polish by ethnicity, and as of 1693 it was exclusively Polish.
