= Grabek, Warmian-Masurian Voivodeship =

Grabek
- Village
- Location within Poland
- Coordinates: 53°50′44″N 21°43′36″E
- Country: Poland
- Voivodeship: Warmian-Masurian
- County: Mrągowo
- Gmina: Mikołajki

Grabek [ˈɡrabɛk] is a village in the administrative district of Gmina Mikołajki, within Mrągowo County, Warmian-Masurian Voivodeship, in northern Poland.
