= Piłak =

- Settlement
- Location within Poland
- Coordinates: 53°46′03″N 21°10′34″E
- Country: Poland
- Voivodeship: Warmian-Masurian
- County: Mrągowo
- Gmina: Sorkwity

Population
  - Total: 3
- Time zone: UTC+1 (CET)
  - Summer (DST): UTC+2 (CEST)
- Vehicle registration: NMR

Piłak [piˈwaki] is a settlement in the administrative district of Gmina Sorkwity, within Mrągowo County, Warmian-Masurian Voivodeship, in northern Poland. It is located in Masuria.
