= Grabówek, Warmian-Masurian Voivodeship =

Grabówek
- Settlement
- Location within Poland
- Coordinates: 53°51′23″N 21°41′48″E
- Country: Poland
- Voivodeship: Warmian-Masurian
- County: Mrągowo
- Gmina: Mikołajki
- Population: 200

Grabówek [ɡraˈbuvɛk] is a settlement in the administrative district of Gmina Mikołajki, within Mrągowo County, Warmian-Masurian Voivodeship, in northern Poland.
