= Zełwągi =

- Village
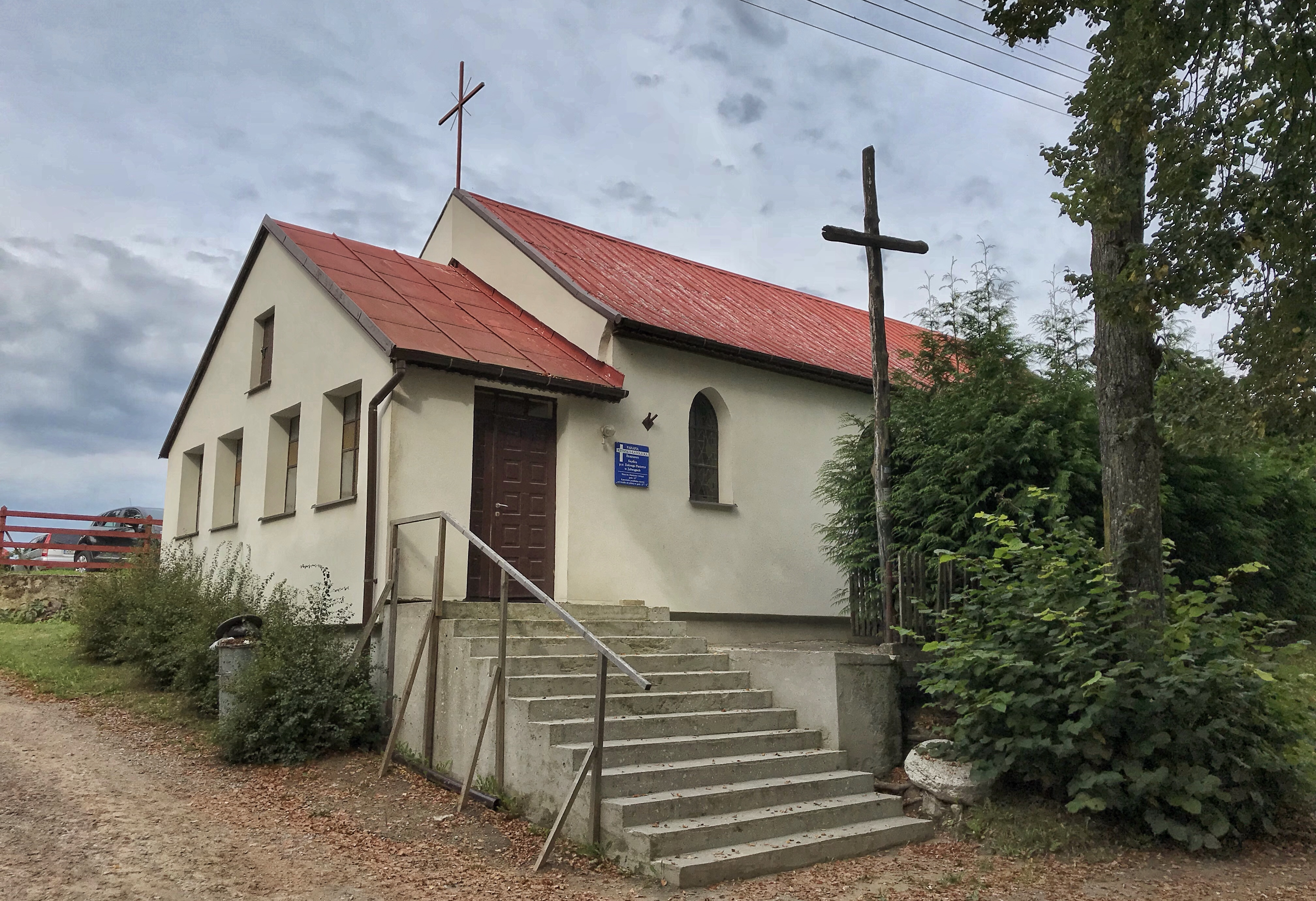

- Location within Poland
- Coordinates: 53°49′N 21°30′E
- Country: Poland
- Voivodeship: Warmian-Masurian
- County: Mrągowo
- Gmina: Mikołajki
- Population: 380

Zełwągi [zɛu̯ˈvɔnɡi] is a village in the administrative district of Gmina Mikołajki, within Mrągowo County, Warmian-Masurian Voivodeship, in northern Poland.

== Latter-day Saints in Selbongen ==
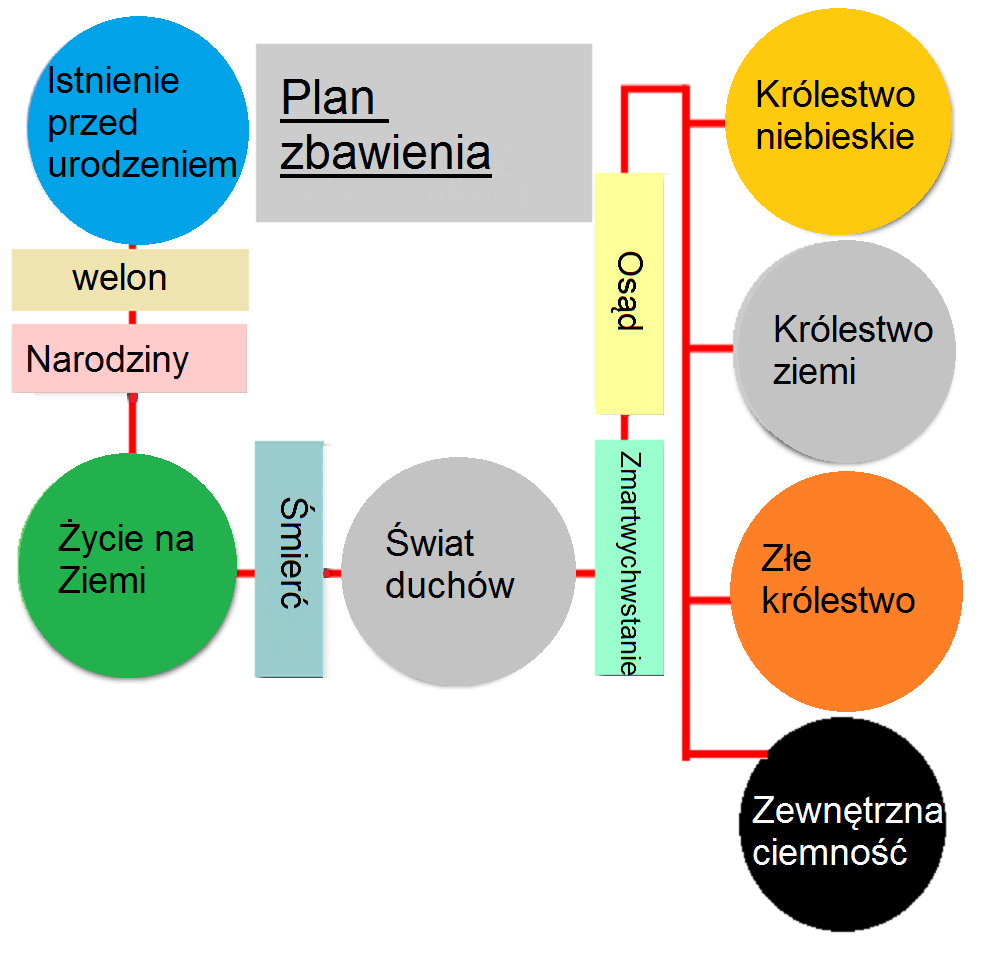
The Plan of salvation in Polish.

This small village occupies a disproportionately prominent place, compared to its size, in the history of the Church of Jesus Christ of Latter-day Saints in Europe, since it was here that the first meeting-house of the Church in continental Europe was built, in 1929. Selbongen was then part of Germany, in an area known as East Prussia.

An inhabitant of Selbongen had been converted to the Church in the early 1920s, and had introduced the Church to his family and neighbours, many of whom later also joined the Church. The branch in Selbongen had several hundred members at its largest: more than half of the inhabitants of the village.

When parts of Germany were given to Poland after World War II, including the area around Selbongen, the local branch there remained active, the only unit of the Church in Poland at the time. Services continued to be held in German until this practice was forbidden by the Polish government in 1947. After members acquired enough Polish to hold services in that language, meetings were resumed. The Church was officially registered with the Polish authorities in 1961.

Most of the members who had not died in the war or were expelled shortly afterwards left in the succeeding years, due to the poor economic conditions in the area. The Zełwągi branch was eventually closed in 1971 due to the declining membership numbers. Subsequently, the Church was put off the register. Some remaining members from Zełwągi contributed to signature drive of the petition to register the Church of Jesus Christ of Latter-day Saints in Poland in 1977. The last Latter-day Saint families left Zełwągi in early 1980s and there are currently no members of the Church there. Many of the members who left Selbongen proved to be supporters of the wards where they moved to.
