= Krzywe, Mrągowo County =

Krzywe
- Village
- Location within Poland
- Coordinates: 53°48′10″N 21°16′17″E
- Country: Poland
- Voivodeship: Warmian-Masurian
- County: Mrągowo
- Gmina: Mrągowo

Krzywe [ˈkʂɨvɛ] is a village in the administrative district of Gmina Mrągowo, within Mrągowo County, Warmian-Masurian Voivodeship, in northern Poland.

As a result of the Treaty of Versailles the 1920 East Prussian plebiscite was organized on 11 July 1920 under the control of the League of Nations, which resulted in 380 votes to remain in Germany and none for Poland.
