= Szczerzbowo =

- Village
- Location within Poland
- Coordinates: 53°57′N 21°26′E
- Country: Poland
- Voivodeship: Warmian-Masurian
- County: Mrągowo
- Gmina: Mrągowo

Szczerzbowo [ʂt͡ʂɛʐˈbɔvɔ] is a village in the administrative district of Gmina Mrągowo, within Mrągowo County, Warmian-Masurian Voivodeship, in northern Poland. In the 2021 Polish census, Szczerzbowo had a population of 185, a drop from the 2011 census where the population was 197.
