= Czerniak, Warmian-Masurian Voivodeship =

Czerniak
- Settlement
- Location within Poland
- Coordinates: 53°54′33″N 21°19′15″E
- Country: Poland
- Voivodeship: Warmian-Masurian
- County: Mrągowo
- Gmina: Mrągowo

Czerniak [ˈt͡ʂɛrɲak] is a settlement in the administrative district of Gmina Mrągowo, within Mrągowo County, Warmian-Masurian Voivodeship, in northern Poland.
