= Karczewiec, Warmian-Masurian Voivodeship =

Karczewiec
- Village
- Location within Poland
- Coordinates: 53°45′51″N 21°8′56″E
- Country: Poland
- Voivodeship: Warmian-Masurian
- County: Mrągowo
- Gmina: Sorkwity

Karczewiec [karˈt͡ʂɛvjɛt͡s] is a village in the administrative district of Gmina Sorkwity, within Mrągowo County, Warmian-Masurian Voivodeship, in northern Poland.
