= Szymanowo, Mrągowo County =

Szymanowo
- Village
- Location within Poland
- Coordinates: 53°56′N 21°8′E
- Country: Poland
- Voivodeship: Warmian-Masurian
- County: Mrągowo
- Gmina: Sorkwity
- Population: 190

Szymanowo (Polish: [ʂɨmaˈnɔvɔ]) is a village in the administrative district of Gmina Sorkwity, within Mrągowo County, Warmian-Masurian Voivodeship, in northern Poland.
