= Lasowiec =

- Settlement
- Location within Poland
- Coordinates: 53°53′N 21°16′E
- Country: Poland
- Voivodeship: Warmian-Masurian
- County: Mrągowo
- Gmina: Mrągowo

Lasowiec [laˈsɔvjɛt͡s] is a settlement in the administrative district of Gmina Mrągowo, within Mrągowo County, Warmian-Masurian Voivodeship, in northern Poland.
