= Nowe Sady =

Nowe Sady may refer to places in Poland:

- Nowe Sady, Opole Voivodeship
- Nowe Sady, Subcarpathian Voivodeship
- Nowe Sady, Warmian-Masurian Voivodeship
