= Maradki =

- Village
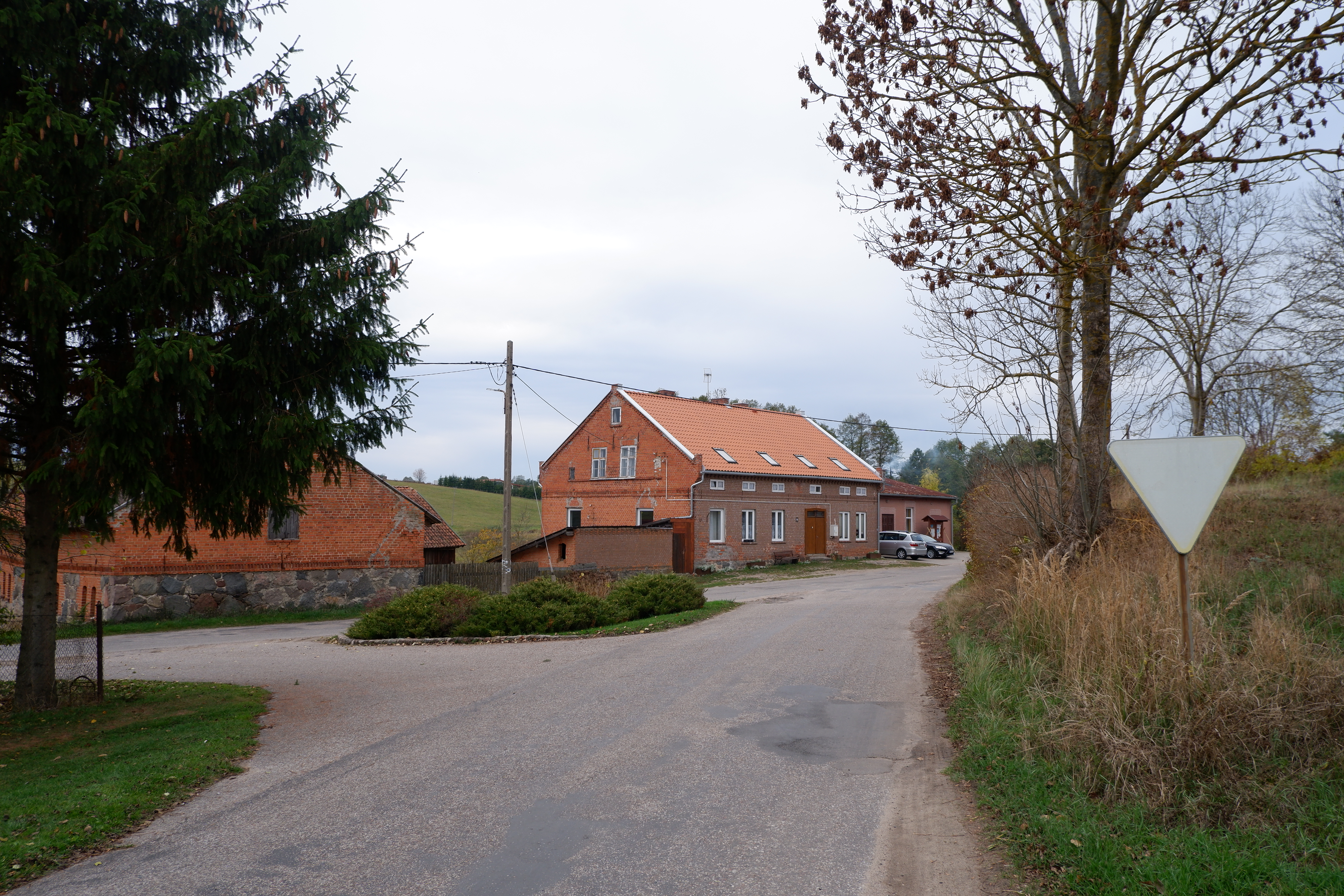

- Location within Poland
- Coordinates: 53°48′43″N 21°8′8″E
- Country: Poland
- Voivodeship: Warmian-Masurian
- County: Mrągowo
- Gmina: Sorkwity
- Population: 130

Maradki [maˈratki] is a village in the administrative district of Gmina Sorkwity, within Mrągowo County, Warmian-Masurian Voivodeship, in northern Poland.
