= Sądry =

- Village
- Location within Poland
- Coordinates: 53°56′N 21°27′E
- Country: Poland
- Voivodeship: Warmian-Masurian
- County: Mrągowo
- Gmina: Mrągowo

Sądry [ˈsɔndrɨ] is a village in the administrative district of Gmina Mrągowo, within Mrągowo County, Warmian-Masurian Voivodeship, in northern Poland.
