= Choszczewo, Warmian-Masurian Voivodeship =

Choszczewo
- Village
- Location within Poland
- Coordinates: 53°53′N 21°5′E
- Country: Poland
- Voivodeship: Warmian-Masurian
- County: Mrągowo
- Gmina: Sorkwity
- Population: 200

Choszczewo [xɔʂˈt͡ʂɛvɔ] is a village in the administrative district of Gmina Sorkwity, within Mrągowo County, Warmian-Masurian Voivodeship, in northern Poland.
