= Gniazdowo, Warmian-Masurian Voivodeship =

Gniazdowo
- Village
- Location within Poland
- Coordinates: 53°49′10″N 21°17′17″E
- Country: Poland
- Voivodeship: Warmian-Masurian
- County: Mrągowo
- Gmina: Mrągowo

Gniazdowo [ɡɲazˈdɔvɔ] is a village in the administrative district of Gmina Mrągowo, within Mrągowo County, Warmian-Masurian Voivodeship, in northern Poland.
