= Cudnochy =

- Village
- Location within Poland
- Coordinates: 53°52′N 21°30′E
- Country: Poland
- Voivodeship: Warmian-Masurian
- County: Mrągowo
- Gmina: Mikołajki

Cudnochy [t͡sudˈnɔxɨ] is a village in the administrative district of Gmina Mikołajki, within Mrągowo County, Warmian-Masurian Voivodeship, in northern Poland.
