= Budziska, Mrągowo County =

Budziska
- Village
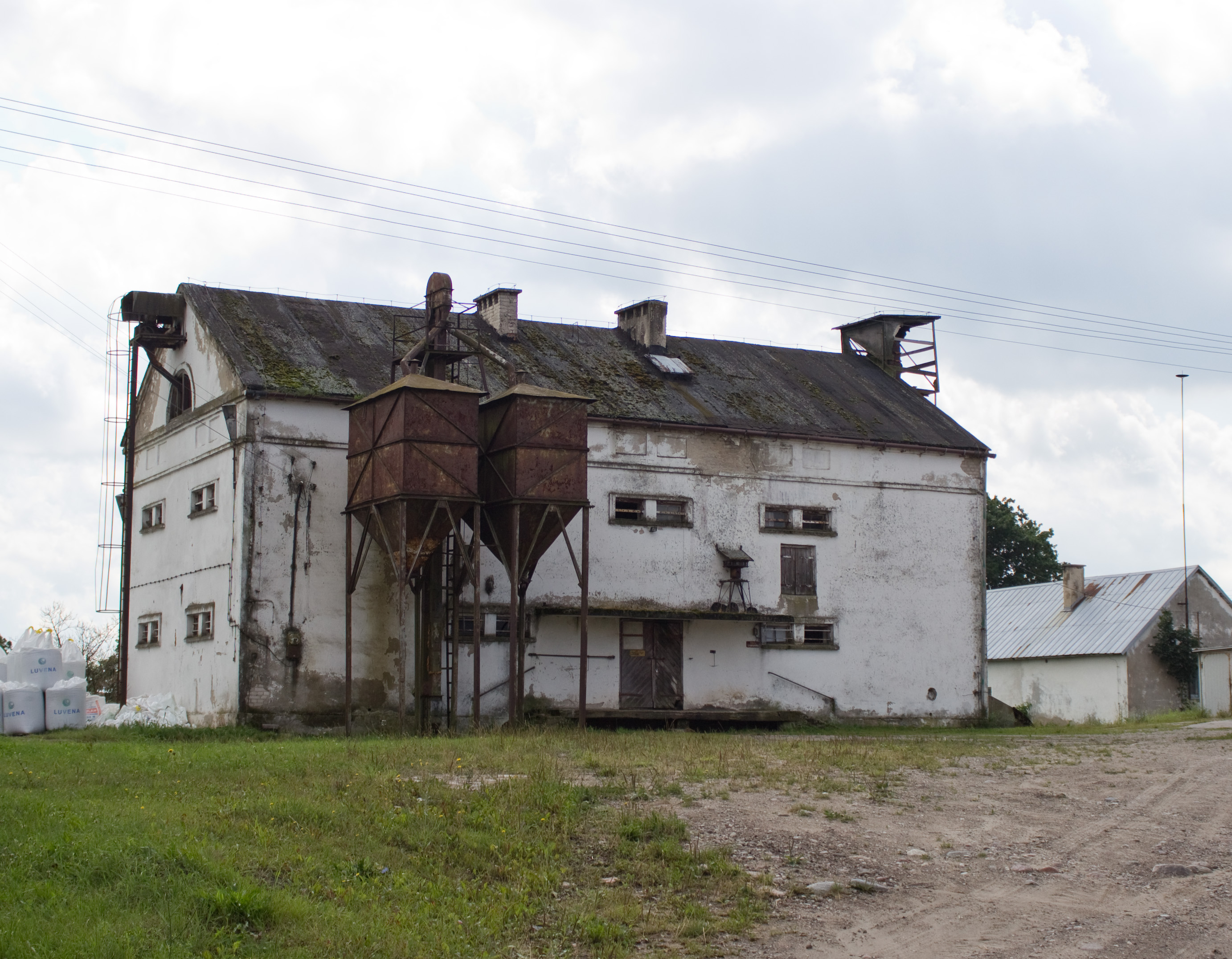

- Location within Poland
- Coordinates: 53°57′36″N 21°25′39″E
- Country: Poland
- Voivodeship: Warmian-Masurian
- County: Mrągowo
- Gmina: Mrągowo

Population
  - Total: 120
- Time zone: UTC+1 (CET)
  - Summer (DST): UTC+2 (CEST)

Budziska [buˈd͡ʑiska] is a village in the administrative district of Gmina Mrągowo, within Mrągowo County, Warmian-Masurian Voivodeship, in northern Poland.

== History ==
The village existed in 1437. In 1553 Czesław Szwejkowski bought land to reestablish the village.

From the 18th century, it was part of Kingdom of Prussia, and from 1871 it was also part of Germany. As a result of the Treaty of Versailles the 1920 East Prussian plebiscite was organized on 11 July 1920 under the control of the League of Nations, which resulted in 80 votes to remain in Germany and none for Poland. Thus the village remained part of Germany until 1945.
