= Nowe Bagienice =

- Village
- Location within Poland
- Coordinates: 53°51′N 21°13′E
- Country: Poland
- Voivodeship: Warmian-Masurian
- County: Mrągowo
- Gmina: Mrągowo
- Population: 70

Nowe Bagienice (Polish pronunciation: [ˈnɔvɛ baɡʲɛˈɲitsɛ]) is a village in the administrative district of Gmina Mrągowo, within Mrągowo County, Warmian-Masurian Voivodeship, in northern Poland.
