= Kiersztanowo =

Kiersztanowo may refer to the following places:

- Kiersztanowo, Mrągowo County in Warmian-Masurian Voivodeship (north Poland)
- Kiersztanowo, Olsztyn County in Warmian-Masurian Voivodeship (north Poland)
- Kiersztanowo, Ostróda County in Warmian-Masurian Voivodeship (north Poland)
