= Górkło =

- Village
- Location within Poland
- Coordinates: 53°53′N 21°42′E
- Country: Poland
- Voivodeship: Warmian-Masurian
- County: Mrągowo
- Gmina: Mikołajki
- Population (approx.): 180
- Website: www.agroturystyka.pl/gorklo/

Górkło [ˈɡurkwɔ] is a village in the administrative district of Gmina Mikołajki, within Mrągowo County, Warmian-Masurian Voivodeship, in northern Poland.
