= Lubiewo, Warmian-Masurian Voivodeship =

Lubiewo
- Village
- Location within Poland
- Coordinates: 53°49′N 21°32′E
- Country: Poland
- Voivodeship: Warmian-Masurian
- County: Mrągowo
- Gmina: Mikołajki

Lubiewo [luˈbjɛvɔ] is a village in the administrative district of Gmina Mikołajki, within Mrągowo County, Warmian-Masurian Voivodeship, in northern Poland.

Unlike the neighboring Warmia region, which historically remained largely Catholic, Masuria was primarily Lutheran Protestant after the secularization of the Teutonic Order in 1525, which formed the Duchy of Prussia
