= Rodowe =

Rodowo
- Village
- Location within Poland
- Coordinates: 53°49′01″N 21°12′04″E
- Country: Poland
- Voivodeship: Warmian-Masurian
- County: Mrągowo
- Gmina: Sorkwity
- Population: 35

Rodowo [rɔˈdɔvɔ] is a village in the administrative district of Gmina Sorkwity, within Mrągowo County, Warmian-Masurian Voivodeship, in northern Poland.
