= Nowy Probark =

- Settlement
- Location within Poland
- Coordinates: 53°49′20″N 21°22′1″E
- Country: Poland
- Voivodeship: Warmian-Masurian
- County: Mrągowo
- Gmina: Mrągowo
- Population: 130
- Postal code: 11-700

Nowy Probark [ˈnɔvɨ ˈprɔbark] (German: Neu Proberg) is a settlement in the administrative district of Gmina Mrągowo, within Mrągowo County, Warmian-Masurian Voivodeship, in northern Poland.

The settlement had a population of 130 in 2006.

The village was divided from Probark in 1825.
