= Paul Ogorzow =

Nazi serial killer and rapist (1912–1941)

- Ogorzow in his S-Bahn uniform
- Born: Paul Saga; 29 September 1912; Muntowen, East Prussia, German Empire
- Died: 26 July 1941 (aged 28); Plötzensee Prison, Berlin, Nazi Germany
- Cause of death: Execution by guillotine
- Other name: The S-Bahn Murderer
- Political party: Nazi Party
- Motive: Sexual sadism; misogyny
- Convictions: Murder × 8; Attempted murder × 6; Assault × 31
- Penalty: Death

Details
- Victims: 8+
- Span of crimes: August 1939 – July 1941
- Country: Nazi Germany
- Location: Berlin
- Date apprehended: 12 July 1941

Paul Ogorzow (born Paul Saga; 29 September 1912 – 26 July 1941), also known as the S-Bahn Murderer, was a German serial killer and rapist who was active in Nazi-era Berlin between 1939 and 1941, during the height of the Second World War. An employee of Deutsche Reichsbahn, he exploited the regular wartime blackouts to commit numerous murders and sex crimes, mostly targeting lone female passengers travelling aboard Berlin's S-Bahn commuter rail system, and solitary housewives whose husbands had been called up for military service. Following his arrest by the Kriminalpolizei, Ogorzow was convicted of killing eight women and executed by guillotine at Plötzensee Prison.

== Background ==
=== Early life ===
Paul Ogorzow was born on 29 September 1912 in the village of Muntowen, East Prussia, Imperial Germany (present-day Muntowo, Poland), the illegitimate child of Marie Saga, a farm worker. Saga's father later filled out his new grandson's birth certificate, marking it with three crosses and the child's birth name of Paul Saga.

In 1924, the now 12-year-old Paul was adopted by Johann Ogorzow, a farmer in Havelland. He would eventually take his adoptive father's surname as his own. Paul was initially employed as a labourer on a farm in the village of Nauen, and later worked at a steel foundry in Brandenburg-an-der-Havel, before ultimately settling in Berlin.

=== Adult life ===
At the age of 18, Ogorzow joined the Nazi Party and eventually became a member of its paramilitary branch, the Sturmabteilung (SA). Following the Nazi seizure of power in 1933, Ogorzow rose modestly in the Party ranks, and by the time of his capture he held the title of Scharführer (squad leader) in the SA.

In 1934, Ogorzow was hired as a platelayer by the national railroad, Deutsche Reichsbahn, which ran the S-Bahn commuter rail system in Berlin. He steadily worked his way up through the organization, eventually becoming an assistant signalman at Rummelsburg depot in the eastern suburbs of the capital, close to Karlshorst. This was the area where most of his crimes later occurred.

Ogorzow married Gertrude Ziegelmann, a saleswoman two years his senior, in 1937. They had two children, a son and a daughter. Initially, they lived with Ogorzow's mother in a working class section of Berlin with numerous allotments, apartment blocks and tenement shacks. The family later moved to another apartment in Karlshorst, near to where Ogorzow worked. He was often seen playing with his children, spending a lot of time in his garden and tending a small cherry orchard in the backyard. At his trial, Ogorzow's wife gave evidence that he often became violent and abusive, obsessively making unfounded claims of her being unfaithful to him.

Ogorzow travelled to his job daily, either by train, on foot or by bicycle. He was generally well-regarded by his co-workers, and was considered reliable and highly competent by his supervisors, often operating both the light signals and the telegraph simultaneously. Although he generally worked in and around a signal box at Zobtener Straße, where the VnK Railway meets the S-Bahn, Ogorzow was often dispatched to work at various locations along the S-Bahn, always wearing his uniform.

== Crimes ==
=== Early crimes ===
After his capture, Ogorzow extensively detailed his various criminal activities to police, allowing for a more precise reconstruction of his crimes. In late August 1939, while he and his family were residing in Karlshorst, Ogorzow began randomly assaulting and raping dozens of women in and around the Friedrichsfelde district. The neighbourhood was populated mostly by solitary housewives whose husbands had been called up for the Second World War. It was these vulnerable women who initially served as Ogorzow's primary source of victims, and police documented thirty-one attacks that occurred in the allotments and tenement area, all of which were later connected to Ogorzow. During his attacks, he either choked his victims, threatened them with a knife or bludgeoned them, and in their statements, all the victims mentioned their attacker wore a railway worker's uniform.

=== Escalation ===
Ogorzow's early attempts at murder were unsuccessful. Between August 1939 and July 1940, he attacked and stabbed three women, all of whom recovered and later gave evidence against him. In August 1940, Ogorzow bludgeoned another woman after raping her on board the S-Bahn. She survived only because after she lost consciousness, Ogorzow mistakenly thought she had died. Another failed effort in September resulted in the victim surviving not only an attempted strangulation but also being thrown from a moving train by Ogorzow. He soon suffered another setback when he attempted to rape a woman in an S-Bahn station, only for her husband and brother-in-law, whom Ogorzow had failed to notice, to rush to her aid after she screamed for help. Ogorzow managed to escape after being severely beaten. In light of this close call, Ogorzow changed his modus operandi and his subsequent crimes were more successful.

=== Murders ===
Ogorzow committed his first murder on 4 October 1940, going on the pretext of a tryst to the home of 20-year-old Gertrude "Gerda" Ditter, whose husband, Arthur, was away in the military. Ditter was stabbed to death. Two months later, on the evening of 4 December, he killed two more women: S-Bahn passenger Elfriede Franke's skull was crushed with an iron bar before her corpse was thrown from the moving train, and 19-year-old Irmgard Freese was raped and bludgeoned to death while walking home. On 22 December, railroad workers discovered the body of a fourth victim, Elisabeth Bungener, discarded alongside the tracks. A medical examination determined she had died as the result of a fractured skull.

Six days later, on 28 December 1940, the Berlin Police recovered Gertrude Siewert the morning after she had been assaulted and thrown from the train by Ogorzow. Suffering from exposure and various life-threatening traumas, she was rushed to hospital and died from her injuries the following day. This scene repeated itself on 5 January 1941, when the unconscious body of Hedwig Ebauer, who was five months pregnant, was located near the S-Bahn. Ogorzow had attempted to strangle Ebauer before throwing her from the train alive. Like Siewert, Ebauer succumbed to her injuries later that day in hospital, never regaining consciousness.

On 11 February, the remains of Ogorzow's seventh victim, Johanna Voigt, a pregnant mother of three, were found. An autopsy later confirmed what most suspected, that Voigt had died as the result of repeated blows to the head and injuries sustained after being thrown from the train. Given the obvious similarities in the various crimes, all seven deaths were deemed to be the work of the same individual.

== Investigation ==
Two of Ogorzow's previous victims, who had survived their attacks, confirmed to police that their assailant was a railway employee in a black uniform. By December 1940, as other similar crimes were already being reported, investigators began looking for a suspect matching Ogorzow's description. Domestic news coverage was censored by various agencies within the Nazi government, as it was believed the murders would damage wartime morale. The Reich Ministry of Public Enlightenment and Propaganda under Joseph Goebbels even issued a directive to German journalists regarding limits to be placed on coverage of the murders.

The homicide unit of the Berlin Police, under SS-Hauptsturmführer Wilhelm Lüdtke, was not able to publicly seek information about the murders or to warn the population about the danger of travelling by rail at night. Lüdtke sent out his best detectives to discreetly investigate. The police operation was underway by December 1940, with 5,000 of Berlin's 8,000 railway workers being interviewed, and police patrols doubled on the S-Bahn. The Nazi government dispatched functionaries to protect unaccompanied women who commuted through the area. Police officers, either women or disguised as women, were used as decoys aboard second-class carriages. Other detectives were disguised as railway workers, and commuters were watched at each station. Ogorzow volunteered for a job escorting solitary women during the night hours.

Despite this effort, the Kriminalpolizei (Kripo) did not catch more than a handful of petty criminals unrelated to the case. The increased police attention prompted Ogorzow to become cautiously inactive for nearly five months following his murder of Voigt in February 1941. He did not re-emerge until 3 July 1941, when he claimed his eighth and final victim, 35-year-old Frieda Koziol. She was raped and bludgeoned to death in the same Friedrichsfelde area where Ogorzow had begun his crime spree two years before.

== Arrest and conviction ==
Ogorzow, who often made misogynistic comments to co-workers and talked often of his fascination with killing, was eventually singled out by investigators looking for potential suspects among railway employees following the murder of Koziol. A coworker reported to police that Ogorzow often climbed over the fence of the Rummelsburg depot during work hours. His explanation was that he was sneaking out to meet a mistress whose husband was in the military.

Lüdtke personally inspected Ogorzow's uniforms, all of which had numerous blood stains. Ogorzow was arrested by the Kripo on 12 July 1941. In an intimidating interrogation in a small room under the light of a single lightbulb, Ogorzow was confronted with one of his severely injured victims and a tray of skulls from several of his killings. In the Kripo's summary of the case submitted on 17 July, Ogorzow's motives were listed as: an excessive sex drive, sexual attraction to his victims' resistance and a pathological hatred of women. Ogorzow willingly confessed his crimes but blamed the murders on alcoholism, claiming that a Jewish doctor had treated him incompetently for gonorrhea.

Ogorzow was formally expelled from the Nazi Party just days prior to his indictment and subsequently pleaded guilty to eight murders, six attempted murders and thirty-one cases of sexual assault. He was promptly sentenced to death on 24 July by the Berlin Kammergericht (regional superior court), in the presence of eight witnesses. Ogorzow was declared an enemy of the people by the Nazi authorities and executed by guillotine at Plötzensee Prison on 26 July 1941, two days after his sentencing.

After the war, one of the Kripo officers involved in the Ogorzow investigation, Georg Heuser, was charged by a West German court for his role in Einsatzgruppen atrocities in the Soviet Union. He was found guilty of being an accessory to over 11,000 murders and sentenced to fifteen years in prison. Heuser served six years of his sentence before being released, and died in 1989.

== Impact of World War II and Nazi society ==
=== War-time conditions ===
Historian Roger Moorhouse has suggested that the Kripo were hampered in their investigation by concurrent obstacles. The Nazi government had instituted a rigorous program of media censorship to avoid demoralising civilians during wartime. This censorship meant that there were only cursory details released about each case, which impeded the progress of the investigation. Due to Allied bombing raids on Berlin, a blackout was necessary. These conditions were conducive to criminal activity. Ogorzow exploited the blackouts, using them to stalk and kill his victims and then to escape under the cover of darkness.

=== Nazi doctrine ===
The official Nazi ideology, whose tenets included antisemitism, xenophobia and notions of German racial superiority, deterred investigators from considering the possibility that someone "racially German" (Aryan) could be responsible for the murders. Much initial suspicion wrongly settled on foreign forced labourers (mostly Polish prisoners of war) working in factories adjacent to the rail network. Local Jews were also targeted unjustly for investigation in connection with the murders, albeit mainly for ideological reasons. Survivor testimony eventually established that the suspect was German, and the perpetrator turned out to be a veteran member of the Nazi Party and the SA.

== See also ==
- 1941 in Germany
- Gordon Cummins – British serial killer who exploited wartime blackouts (1914–1942)
- Johann Eichhorn (serial killer) – Executed German serial killer and rapist (1906–1939)
- List of German serial killers
- Eddie Leonski – American soldier and serial murderer

== Sources ==
- Moorhouse, Roger (May 2009). "Nazi Serial Killer". BBC History. Vol. 10, no. 5. pp. 38–40.
- Moorhouse, Roger (2011) [2010]. Berlin at War: Life and Death in Hitler's Capital, 1939–1945. Vintage Books. ISBN 9780099551898.
- Selby, Scott Andrew (2014). A Serial Killer in Nazi Berlin: The Chilling True Story of the S-Bahn Murderer. Berkley Publishing Group. ISBN 978-0-425-26414-0.
