= Kozarek Wielki =

- Settlement
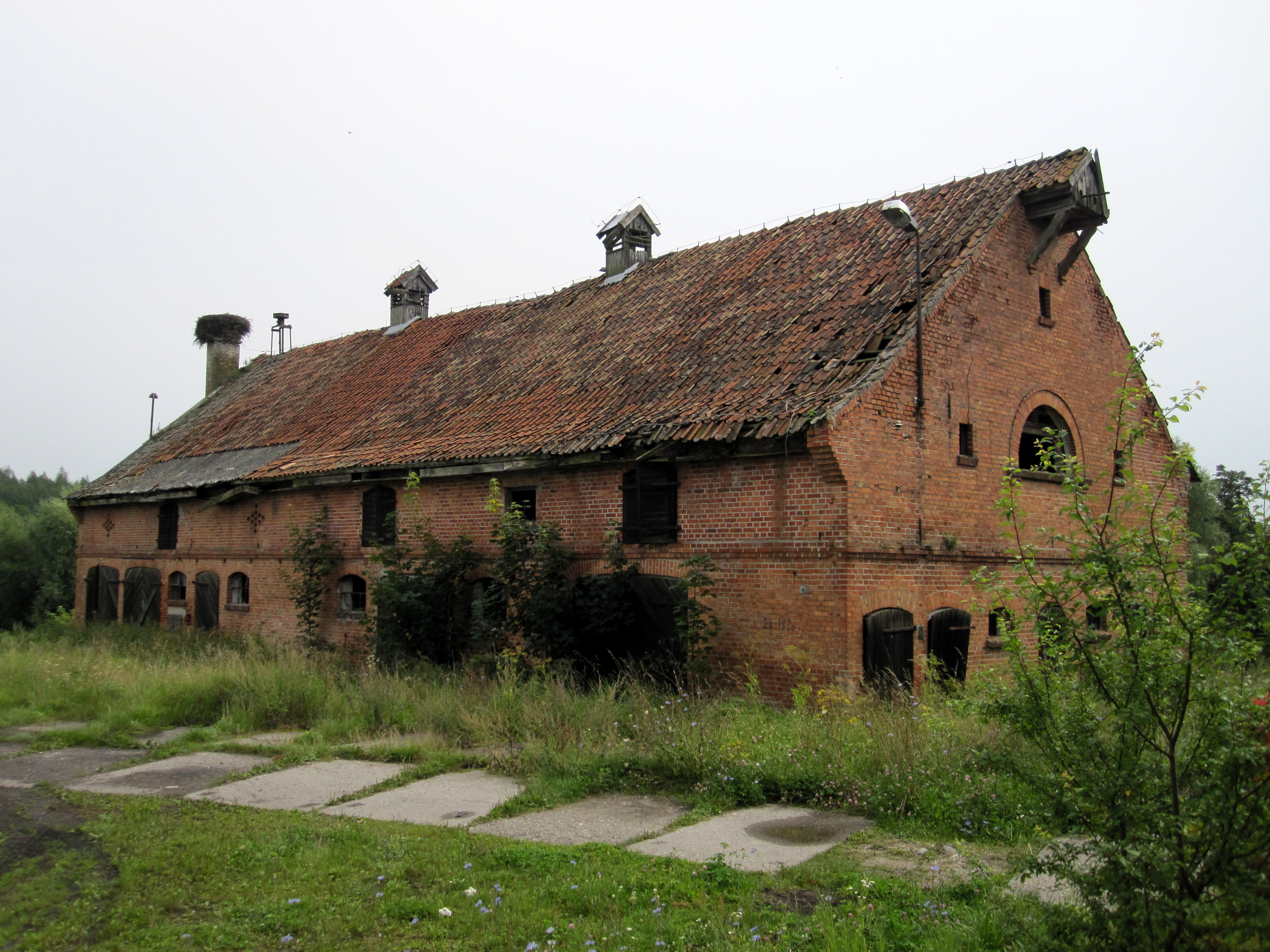
- Abandoned manor in Kozarek

- Location within Poland
- Coordinates: 53°50′03″N 21°05′52″E
- Country: Poland
- Voivodeship: Warmian-Masurian
- County: Mrągowo
- Gmina: Sorkwity
- Population: 94

Kozarek Wielki (Polish pronunciation: [kɔˈzarɛk ˈfjɛlkʲi]) is a settlement in the administrative district of Gmina Sorkwity, within Mrągowo County, Warmian-Masurian Voivodeship, in northern Poland.
