= Urwitałt =

- Settlement
- Location within Poland
- Coordinates: 53°48′19″N 21°38′34″E
- Country: Poland
- Voivodeship: Warmian-Masurian
- County: Mrągowo
- Gmina: Mikołajki
- Elevation: 117 m (384 ft)

Urwitałt [urˈvitau̯t] is a settlement in the administrative district of Gmina Mikołajki, within Mrągowo County, Warmian-Masurian Voivodeship, in northern Poland.
