= Notyst Dolny =

- Settlement
- Location within Poland
- Coordinates: 53°54′N 21°29′E
- Country: Poland
- Voivodeship: Warmian-Masurian
- County: Mrągowo
- Gmina: Mrągowo

Notyst Dolny [ˈnɔtɨst ˈdɔlnɨ] is a settlement in the administrative district of Gmina Mrągowo, within Mrągowo County, Warmian-Masurian Voivodeship, in northern Poland.
