= Gmina Mikołajki =

Gmina Mikołajki Mikołajki Commune
- Gmina
- Flag Coat of arms
- Interactive map of Gmina Mikołajki
- Coordinates (Mikołajki): 53°48′N 21°35′E
- Country: Poland
- Voivodeship: Warmian-Masurian
- County: Mrągowo
- Seat: Mikołajki

Area
  - Total: 256.41 km^{2} (99.00 sq mi)

Population (2006)
  - Total: 8,435
  - Density: 32.90/km^{2} (85.20/sq mi)
  - Urban: 3,848
  - Rural: 4,587
- Website: http://www.mikolajki.pl/

Gmina Mikołajki is an urban-rural gmina (administrative district) in Mrągowo County, Warmian-Masurian Voivodeship, in northern Poland. Its seat is the town of Mikołajki, which lies approximately 21 kilometres (13 mi) east of Mrągowo and 72 km (45 mi) east of the regional capital Olsztyn.

The gmina covers an area of 256.41 square kilometres (99.0 sq mi), and as of 2006 its total population is 8,435 (out of which the population of Mikołajki amounts to 3,848, and the population of the rural part of the gmina is 4,587).

The gmina contains part of the protected area called Masurian Landscape Park.

== Villages ==
Apart from the town of Mikołajki, Gmina Mikołajki contains the villages and settlements of Baranowo, Cimowo, Cudnochy, Dybowo, Faszcze, Górkło, Grabek, Grabnik, Grabnik Mały, Grabówek, Grabówka, Inulec, Jora Mała, Jora Wielka, Kolonia Mikołajki, Kulinowo, Lelek, Lisiny, Lisunie, Lubiewo, Łuknajno, Łuknajno-Leśniczówka, Małaszewo, Mateuszek, Nadawki, Nowe Sady, Olszewo, Osa, Prawdowo, Pszczółki, Sady, Śmietki, Śmietki Małe, Stawek, Tałty, Tałty SHR, Urwitałt, Woźnice, Zełwągi and Zielony Gaj.

== Neighbouring gminas ==
Gmina Mikołajki is bordered by the gminas of Miłki, Mrągowo, Orzysz, Piecki, Pisz, Ruciane-Nida and Ryn.
