= Kiersztanowo, Mrągowo County =

Kiersztanowo
- Village
- Location within Poland
- Coordinates: 53°55′49″N 21°15′38″E
- Country: Poland
- Voivodeship: Warmian-Masurian
- County: Mrągowo
- Gmina: Mrągowo

Population
  - Total: 140
- Time zone: UTC+1 (CET)
  - Summer (DST): UTC+2 (CEST)
- Vehicle registration: NMR

Kiersztanowo [kʲɛrʂtaˈnɔvɔ] is a village in the administrative district of Gmina Mrągowo, within Mrągowo County, Warmian-Masurian Voivodeship, in northern Poland. It is located in the region of Masuria.

== History ==
In 1536 it was inhabited by Poles and Germans, and in 1693 it was inhabited solely by Poles.

As a result of the Treaty of Versailles the 1920 East Prussian plebiscite was organized on 11 July 1920 under the control of the League of Nations, which resulted in 360 votes to remain in Germany and none for Poland.

Seven Polish citizens were murdered by Nazi Germany in the village during World War II.
