= Gmina Sorkwity =

Gmina Sorkwity Sorkwity Commune
- Gmina
- Interactive map of Gmina Sorkwity
- Coordinates (Sorkwity): 53°50′42″N 21°8′35″E
- Country: Poland
- Voivodeship: Warmian-Masurian
- County: Mrągowo
- Seat: Sorkwity

Area
  - Total: 184.56 km^{2} (71.26 sq mi)

Population (2006)
  - Total: 4,626
  - Density: 25.07/km^{2} (64.92/sq mi)
- Website: http://www.gminasorkwity.pl

Gmina Sorkwity is a rural gmina (administrative district) in Mrągowo County, Warmian-Masurian Voivodeship, in northern Poland. Its seat is the village of Sorkwity, which lies approximately 11 kilometres (7 mi) west of Mrągowo and 43 km (27 mi) east of the regional capital Olsztyn.

The gmina covers an area of 184.56 square kilometres (71.3 sq mi), and as of 2006 its total population was 4,626.

== Villages ==
Gmina Sorkwity contains the villages and settlements of Bałowo, Borowe, Borowski Las, Burszewo, Choszczewo, Gieląd Mały, Gizewo, Głodowo, Janiszewo, Janowo, Jędrychowo, Jełmuń, Karczewiec, Kozarek Mały, Kozarek Wielki, Kozłowo, Lesiny, Maradki, Maradzki Chojniak, Miłuki, Młynik, Nibork, Nowy Gieląd, Piłaki, Pustniki, Rodowe, Rozogi, Rybno, Słomowo, Sorkwity, Stama, Stary Gieląd, Surmówka, Szarłaty, Szelągówka, Szymanowo, Tyszkowo, Warpuny, Wilamówko, Wola Maradzka, Załuki, Zamkowo, and Zyndaki.

== Neighbouring gminas ==
Gmina Sorkwity is bordered by the gminas of Biskupiec, Dźwierzuty, Kolno, Mrągowo, Piecki, and Reszel.
