= Gmina Mrągowo =

Gmina Mrągowo Mrągowo Commune
- Gmina
- Interactive map of Gmina Mrągowo
- Coordinates (Mrągowo): 53°52′N 21°18′E
- Country: Poland
- Voivodeship: Warmian-Masurian
- County: Mrągowo
- Seat: Mrągowo

Area
  - Total: 294.87 km^{2} (113.85 sq mi)

Population (2006)
  - Total: 7,485
  - Density: 25.38/km^{2} (65.74/sq mi)

Gmina Mrągowo is a rural gmina (administrative district) in Mrągowo County, Warmian-Masurian Voivodeship, in northern Poland. Its seat is the town of Mrągowo, although the town is not part of the territory of the gmina.

The gmina covers an area of 294.87 square kilometres (113.8 sq mi), and as of 2006 its total population is 7,485.

The gmina contains part of the protected area called Masurian Landscape Park.

== Villages ==
Gmina Mrągowo contains the villages and settlements of Bagienice, Bagienice Małe, Bagnowski Dwór, Boża Wólka, Boże, Boże Małe, Brodzikowo, Budziska, Czerniak, Czerwonki, Dobroszewo, Gązwa, Głazowo, Gniazdowo, Grabowo, Gronowo, Gwiazdowo, Joachimowo, Karwie, Kiersztanowo, Kosewo, Kosewo Górne, Krzosowo, Krzywe, Kucze, Lasowiec, Lembruk, Marcinkowo, Miejski Las, Mierzejewo, Młynowo, Muntowo, Nikutowo, Notyst Dolny, Notyst Mały, Notyst Wielki, Nowe Bagienice, Nowy Probark, Palestyna, Pełkowo, Piotrówka, Polska Wieś, Popowo Salęckie, Porębiska, Poręby, Probark, Ruska Wieś, Rydwągi, Sądry, Śniadowo, Sobięcin, Szczerzbowo, Szestno, Troszczykowo, Tymnikowo, Użranki, Wierzbowo, Witomin, Wola Muntowska, Wólka Bagnowska, Wólka Baranowska, Wymysły, Wyszembork, Zalec and Zawada.

== Neighbouring gminas ==
Gmina Mrągowo is bordered by the town of Mrągowo and by the gminas of Kętrzyn, Mikołajki, Piecki, Reszel, Ryn and Sorkwity.
