= Borowe, Warmian-Masurian Voivodeship =

Borowe
- Village
- Location within Poland
- Coordinates: 53°48′N 21°14′E
- Country: Poland
- Voivodeship: Warmian-Masurian
- County: Mrągowo
- Gmina: Sorkwity
- Founded: 1548
- Time zone: UTC+1 (CET)
  - Summer (DST): UTC+2 (CEST)
- Postal code: 11-731
- Area code: +48 89
- Vehicle registration: NMR

Borowe [bɔˈrɔvɛ] is a village in the administrative district of Gmina Sorkwity, within Mrągowo County, Warmian-Masurian Voivodeship, in north-eastern Poland. It is located in the historic region of Masuria.

== History ==
The village was established in 1548 by Bartosz, sołtys of Widryny, when it was part of Poland as a fief held by Ducal Prussia. As of 1693, the population of the village was solely Polish. From the 18th century it was part of the Kingdom of Prussia, and from 1871 to 1945 it was part of Germany within the province of East Prussia. During a massive campaign of renaming of placenames, the German administration renamed the village to Prausken to erase traces of Polish origin. During World War II, the Germans operated a forced labour camp for Jews in the village. After the defeat of Nazi Germany in the war, in 1945, the village along with Masuria became again part of Poland, and its historic name was restored.
