= Nowe Sady, Warmian-Masurian Voivodeship =

Nowe Sady
- Settlement
- Location within Poland
- Coordinates: 53°48′53″N 21°31′55″E
- Country: Poland
- Voivodeship: Warmian-Masurian
- County: Mrągowo
- Gmina: Mikołajki
- Population: 180

Nowe Sady [ˈnɔvɛ ˈsadɨ] is a settlement in the administrative district of Gmina Mikołajki, within Mrągowo County, Warmian-Masurian Voivodeship, in northern Poland.
