= Notyst Wielki =

- Village
- Location within Poland
- Coordinates: 53°54′11″N 21°28′17″E
- Country: Poland
- Voivodeship: Warmian-Masurian
- County: Mrągowo
- Gmina: Mrągowo
- Population: 50

Notyst Wielki (Polish pronunciation: [ˈnɔtɨst ˈfjɛlkʲi]) is a village in the administrative district of Gmina Mrągowo, within Mrągowo County, Warmian-Masurian Voivodeship, in northern Poland.
