= Johann Eichhorn (serial killer) =

Executed German serial killer and rapist (1906–1939)

- Eichhorn in police custody in 1939
- Born: October 8, 1906; Munich, Bavaria, German Empire
- Died: December 1, 1939 (aged 33); Stadelheim Prison, Munich, Nazi Germany
- Cause of death: Execution by guillotine
- Other name: "The Beast of Aubing"
- Political party: Nazi Party
- Status: Executed
- Convictions: Murder (x5); Rape (x90)
- Penalty: Death

Details
- Victims: 90+ (5+ killed)
- Span of crimes: 1931–1939
- Country: Germany
- State: Bavaria
- Date apprehended: January 29, 1939

Johann Eichhorn (October 8, 1906 – December 1, 1939), known as The Beast of Aubing (German: Die Bestie von Aubing), was a German serial killer and rapist who raped at least 90 women in Munich from 1931 to 1939, killing at least five of them. Eichhorn was convicted of these crimes and executed, but his case was suppressed by the contemporary Nazi regime, possibly due to his membership in the Nazi Party, which he had joined in 1933.

== Early life ==
Johann Eichhorn was born on October 8, 1906, in the district of Aubing, Munich. He was the oldest of eight children born to day labourers Johann and Magdalena Eichhorn, who lived modestly but took good care of their children. After graduating from elementary school, he did an apprenticeship as a fitter and then got a job as a shunter at the Deutsche Reichsbahn. While he was considered helpful and reliable by his colleagues, Eichhorn would himself later state that he had a disturbed relationship with women, claiming that he felt no excitement when he was kissed and only began feeling pleasure when violence was involved.

== Crimes ==
Eichhorn's assaults began in 1928, with his first two victims were believed to have been his two sisters. His modus operandi was to attack young women in western Munich, threatening them with either a pistol or a knife, before he beat, often raped and sometimes robbed them.

On October 11, 1931, Eichhorn met 16-year-old maid Katharina Schätzl at the Oktoberfest, and a few days after their first meeting, he asked to go on a bike ride with her towards Ebenhausen. When they reached the monastery at Schäftlarn, Eichhorn attacked her, knocking Schätzl to the ground and raping her before finally strangling her to death. Afterwards, he weighted her body with stones and threw it into the Isar river. Her body later washed up in Großhesselohe.

On May 30, 1934, he grabbed the newlywed hairdresser's wife Anna Geltl off her bike while she was riding in Forstenrieder Park. Eichhorn then shot her in the back of the head with a pistol when she resisted him, dragging the body into a nearby bush and mutilating her genitalia with an 18 cm knife. Just a few months later, on September 9, 25-year-old clerk Berta Sauerbeck was attacked while riding in the Milbertshofen district. Since she fiercely resisted his advances, he shot Sauerbeck in the back of the head with his pistol, but she survived the initial shot. Eichhorn then buried the injured woman under a garbage pit, where she subsequently died.

In 1935, Eichhorn married a woman named Josefa, with whom he had two children in the next few years. Despite being married, he continued to attack women, but no fatalities were recorded during this period. According to Eichhorn, this was because his wife loved the violent sex they had, allowing him to keep his urges under control. In the summer of 1937, he shot 25-year-old seamstress Rosa Eigelein in the back of the head near Germering, raped her corpse, mutilated her genitalia, and left her body lying near the road. A year later, in the autumn of 1938, 23-year-old domestic servant Maria Jörg met with the same fate while riding around Forstenrieder Park, not far from where Schätzl was killed, becoming his final known murder victim.

== Arrest, trial and execution ==
On January 29, 1939, passers-by observed Eichhorn attempting to molest a 12-year-old girl and detained him on the spot. During his pre-trial detention, he confessed to the five individual murders over the course of several months of interrogations, in which he described himself as a "wild animal". He was then examined by various doctors and psychologists, who concluded that he was of average intelligence, but was "an ethically and morally profound, unfounded, weak-willed, unusually sexually instinctive psychopath (...) who plans his crimes in advance and carries them out in such a manner." When asked why only five of his numerous rape victims were killed, Eichhorn replied that he shot them instinctively only if they resisted fiercely, as he had no idea what else to do in that situation, and they could be "fully his" once they were dead.

At his trial, the Sondergericht sentenced him to death for the five murders and 90 rapes, despite Eichhorn denying the murders and admitting only 37 of the rapes. His wife divorced him, changed her family name and moved away as a result. At the end of November 1939, Eichhorn wrote a farewell letter to his former wife and two children from prison, apologizing for his actions and accepting his fate. On December 1, 1939, he was guillotined at the Stadelheim Prison.

== Aftermath ==
While Eichhorn's crimes were suppressed by the contemporary press, his case regained infamy in the 21st century after a re-examination of police files. This has prompted several authors to write books about or based on Eichhorn, including Andrea Maria Schenkel, who based her 2007 book Kalteis (later adapted into a play) on the case. In 2015, Johann Eichhorn was included among the Nazi-era serial killers in a 2015 book by author Wolfgang Krüger.

== See also ==
- Paul Ogorzow, another Nazi-era German serial killer
- List of German serial killers
- List of serial rapists

== Bibliography ==
- Andrea Maria Schenkel and Monica Bleitreu (May 4, 2009). Kalteis [Ice Cold] (in German). Verlagsgruppe Random House GmbH. ISBN 978-3442738007.
- Wolfgang Krüger (November 1, 2015). Kriminalchronik des Dritten Reiches / Serienmörder des Dritten Reiches: 1933-1945 [Criminal Chronicle of the Third Reich / Serial Killers of the Third Reich: 1933-1945] (in German). Kirchschlager Publishing. ISBN 978-3934277557.
