= Nové Sady (Žďár nad Sázavou District) =

- Municipality
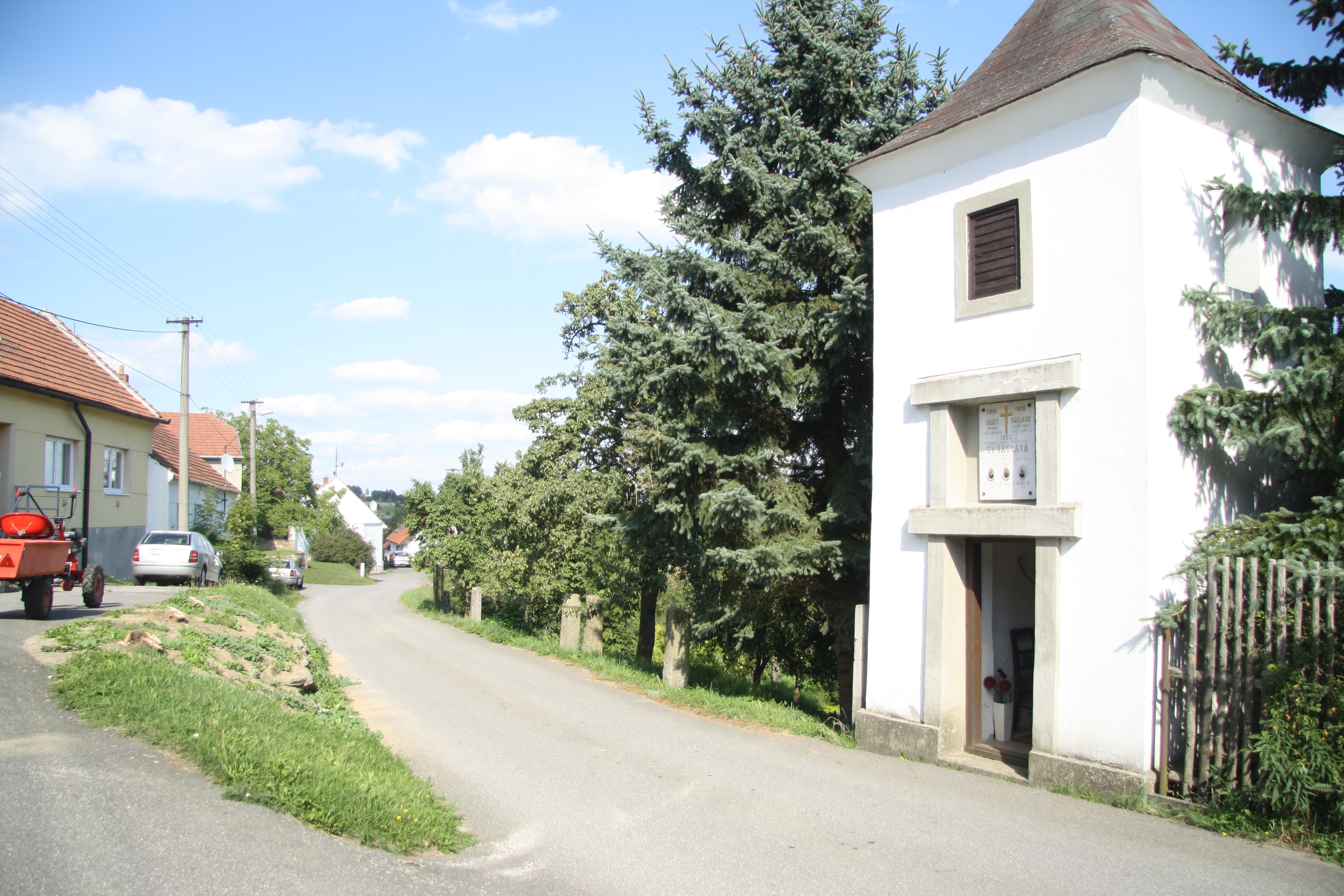
- Belfry in the centre of Nové Sady

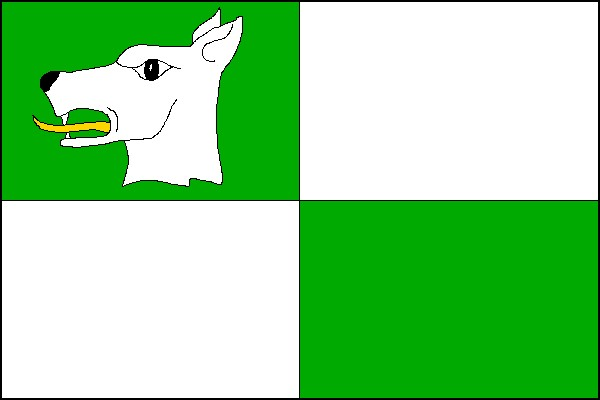
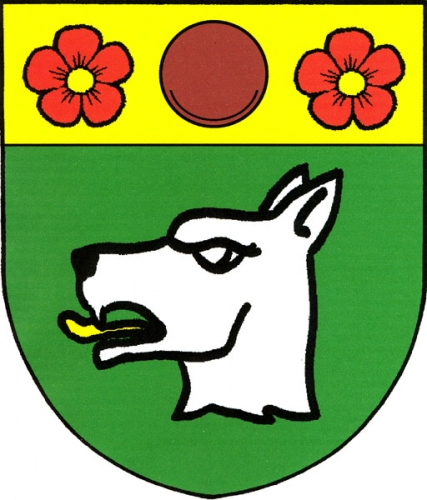
- Flag Coat of arms

- Location in the Czech Republic
- Coordinates: 49°17′37″N 16°11′36″E
- Country: Czech Republic
- Region: Vysočina
- District: Žďár nad Sázavou
- First mentioned: 1356

Area
  - Total: 3.66 km^{2} (1.41 sq mi)
- Elevation: 495 m (1,624 ft)

Population (2026-01-01)
  - Total: 255
  - Density: 69.7/km^{2} (180/sq mi)
- Time zone: UTC+1 (CET)
  - Summer (DST): UTC+2 (CEST)
- Postal code: 595 01
- Website: novesady.cz

Nové Sady is a municipality and village in Žďár nad Sázavou District in the Vysočina Region of the Czech Republic. It has about 300 inhabitants.

Nové Sady lies approximately 36 kilometres (22 mi) south-east of Žďár nad Sázavou, 46 km (29 mi) east of Jihlava, and 156 km (97 mi) south-east of Prague.

== Demographics ==
Historical population
Year	Pop.	±%
1869	194	—
1880	195	+0.5%
1890	192	−1.5%
1900	211	+9.9%
1910	204	−3.3%
1921	194	−4.9%
1930	216	+11.3%
1950	173	−19.9%
1961	176	+1.7%
1970	160	−9.1%
1980	162	+1.2%
1991	146	−9.9%
2001	188	+28.8%
2011	191	+1.6%
2021	260	+36.1%
Source: Censuses
