= Mrągowo County =

Mrągowo County Powiat mrągowski
- County
- Flag Coat of arms

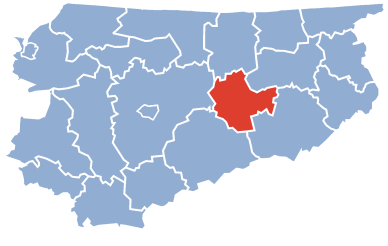
- Location within the voivodeship

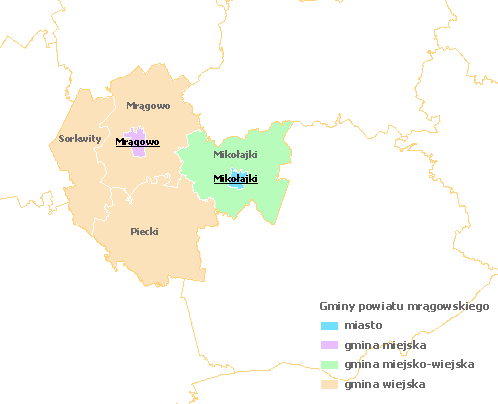
- Division into gminas
- Coordinates (Mrągowo): 53°52′N 21°18′E
- Country: Poland
- Voivodeship: Warmian-Masurian
- Seat: Mrągowo
- Gminas: Total 5 (incl. 1 urban): Mrągowo; Gmina Mikołajki; Gmina Mrągowo; Gmina Piecki; Gmina Sorkwity

Area
  - Total: 1,065.23 km^{2} (411.29 sq mi)

Population (2006)
  - Total: 50,087
  - Density: 47.020/km^{2} (121.78/sq mi)
  - Urban: 25,620
  - Rural: 24,467
- Car plates: NMR
- Website: www.powiat.mragowo.pl

Mrągowo County (Polish: powiat mrągowski) is a unit of territorial administration and local government (powiat) in Warmian-Masurian Voivodeship, northern Poland. It came into being on January 1, 1999, as a result of the Polish local government reforms passed in 1998. Its administrative seat and largest town is Mrągowo, which lies 54 kilometres (34 mi) east of the regional capital Olsztyn. The only other town in the county is Mikołajki, lying 21 km (13 mi) east of Mrągowo.

The county covers an area of 1,065.23 square kilometres (411.3 sq mi). As of 2006 its total population is 50,087, out of which the population of Mrągowo is 21,772, that of Mikołajki is 3,848, and the rural population is 24,467.

== Neighbouring counties ==
Mrągowo County is bordered by Kętrzyn County to the north, Giżycko County to the east, Pisz County to the south-east, Szczytno County to the south and Olsztyn County to the west.

== Administrative division ==
The county is subdivided into five gminas (one urban, one urban-rural and three rural). These are listed in the following table, in descending order of population.

Gmina	Type	Area (km²)	Population (2006)	Seat
Mrągowo	urban	14.8	21,772	
Gmina Mikołajki	urban-rural	256.4	8,435	Mikołajki
Gmina Piecki	rural	314.6	7,769	Piecki
Gmina Mrągowo	rural	294.9	7,485	Mrągowo *
Gmina Sorkwity	rural	184.6	4,626	Sorkwity
* seat not part of the gmina
