= Krutynia =

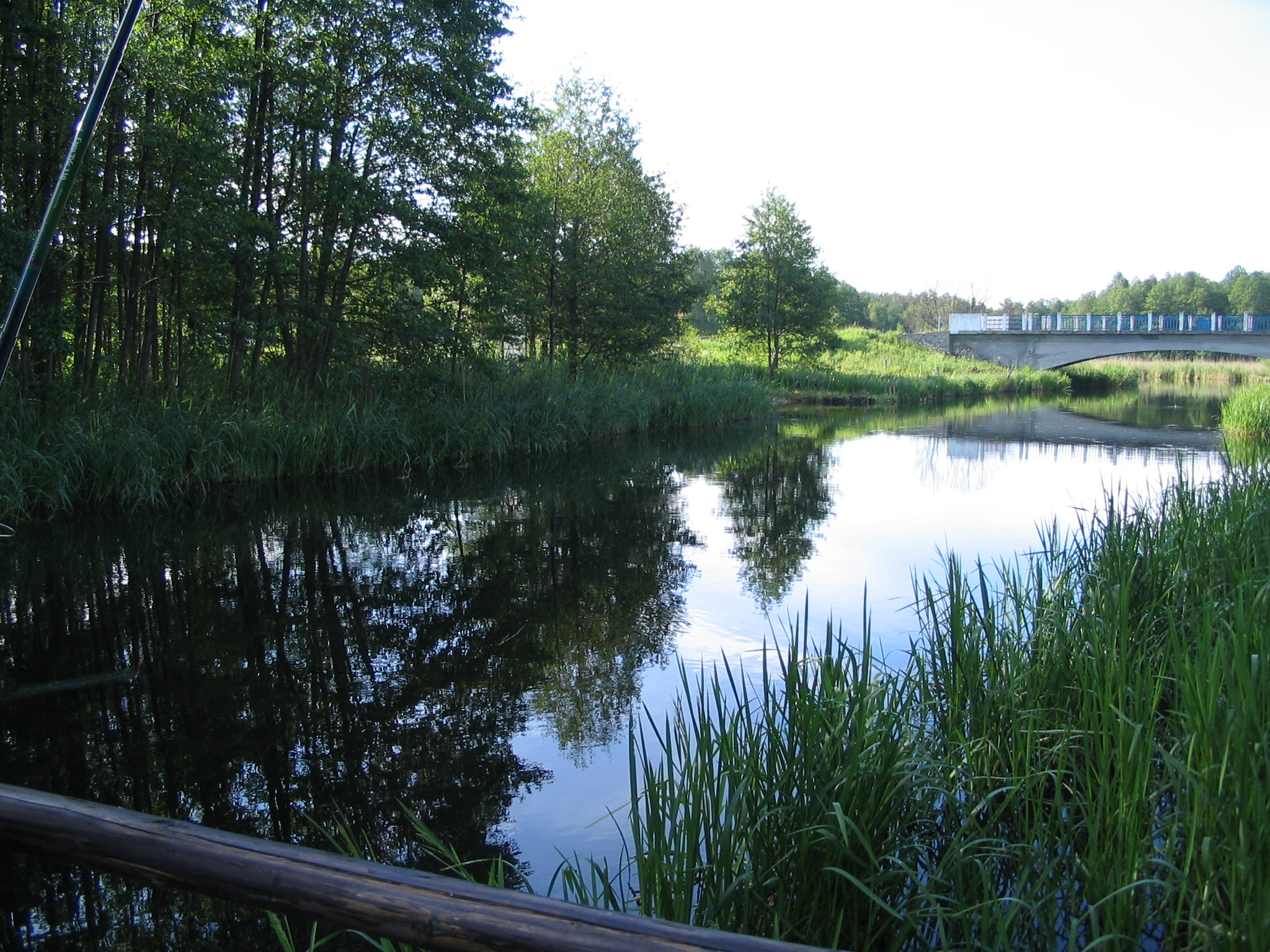

Location
- Country: Poland

Physical characteristics
- Mouth
  - location: lake Bełdany
  - coordinates: 53.7348°N 21.5512°E
- Length: 99 km (62 mi)

Basin features
- Progression: Bełdany→ Lake Roś→ Pisa→ Narew→ Vistula→ Baltic Sea

Krutynia is a river of Masurian Lake District in Poland. It discharges into the lake Bełdany, which is connected with Lake Roś through several canals and lakes. Roś is drained by the river Pisa.

The Krutynia is one of the most famous waterways, repeatedly referred to the "most beautiful canoe trail in Europe". Current of the river, with numerous bends, is actually slow. Width of the river reaches 30–40 meters and depth is from 1,5-2,5 to 3–7 meters. The Krutynia flows through the landscape-water-forest reserve, in two municipalities terrain: Mikołajki and Ruciane-Nida.

Canoe trail runs from the Mokre Lake, through Puszcza Piska and Masurian Landscape Park. Most famous part of canoe trail begins in Sorkwity and ends in Ruciane-Nida.

In the river are:

- Nuphar lutea
- Nymphaea alba
- Stratiotes aloides
- Sagittaria sagittifolia
