= Węgorzewski Canal =

Canal in Warmian-Masurian Voivodeship, Poland

Coordinates: 54.2072°N 21.7298°E

- Location: Węgorzewo, Warmian–Masurian Voivodeship
- Country: Poland

The Węgorzewo Canal (Polish: Kanał Węgorzewski) (German: Nähe-Kanal) is a Masurian canal connecting Lake Mamry with the port in Węgorzewo (via the Węgorapa River). The road from Ruciane-Nida and Pisz with Węgorzewo passes through it.

== History of the canal ==
The canal was dug on the initiative of the Prussian authorities in the years 1765–1772, but in the first decades of the 19th century, it, along with other canals, ceased to function. The Masurian canals were rebuilt during public works carried out from 1854 to 1857.

== Surroundings ==
At the exit of the canal onto Lake Mamry is a bathing lake, a guarded swimming area and tourist infrastructure. A pedestrian and bicycle path runs along the canal. In the waters and surrounding area, you can observe grey herons, grebes, cranes, kites, and beavers, among others.
