= Masurian =

Masurian or Mazurian may refer to:

- someone or something from Masuria
- the Masurians, a sub-ethnic group
- the Masurian dialects of Polish
- the Masurians, historical name for Masovians
- Warmian–Masurian Voivodeship, an administrative division in northern Poland
- Masurian Landscape Park, a protected area in Masuria
- Masurian Lake District
