= Nida Canal =

Canal in Poland

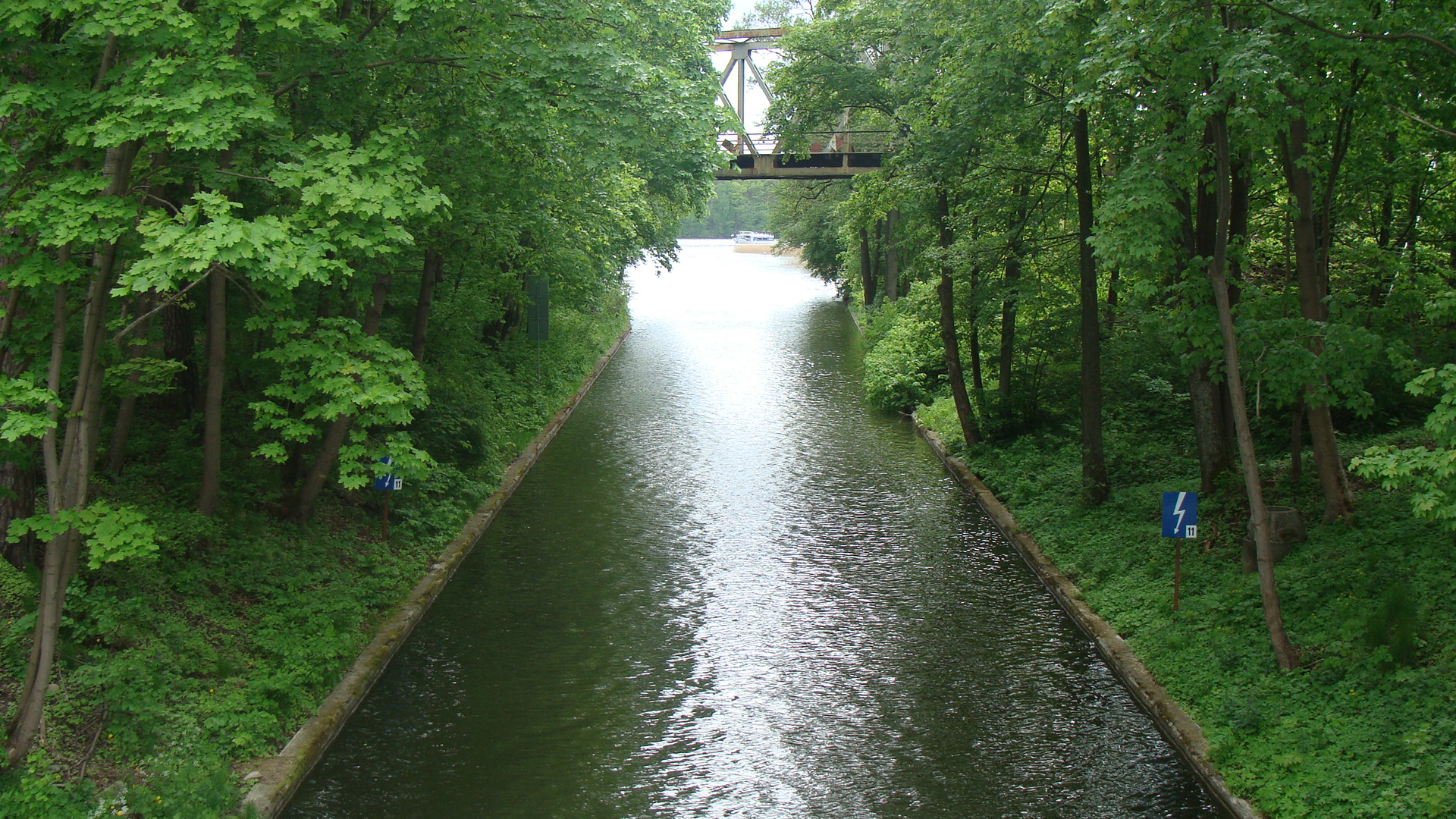
- Location: Ruciane-Nida, Warmian–Masurian Voivodeship
- Country: Poland

History
- Date of first use: 1766

Geography
- Beginning coordinates: 53°38′40.0″N 21°34′03.1″E
- Ending coordinates: 53°38′46.9″N 21°34′09.4″E

The Nida Canal (Polish: Kanał Nidzki) is a Masurian canal, connecting Lake Nidzkie with Guzianka Wielka. The road passes through Ruciane-Nida to Węgorzewo (via Mikołajki and Giżycko). It is the shortest canal on the Great Masurian Lakes route, on a par with the Sztynort Canal.

There are two bridges over the canal: one railway line between Szczytno–Pisz and a highway from Ruciane-Nida–Pisz.
