= Puszcza Piska =

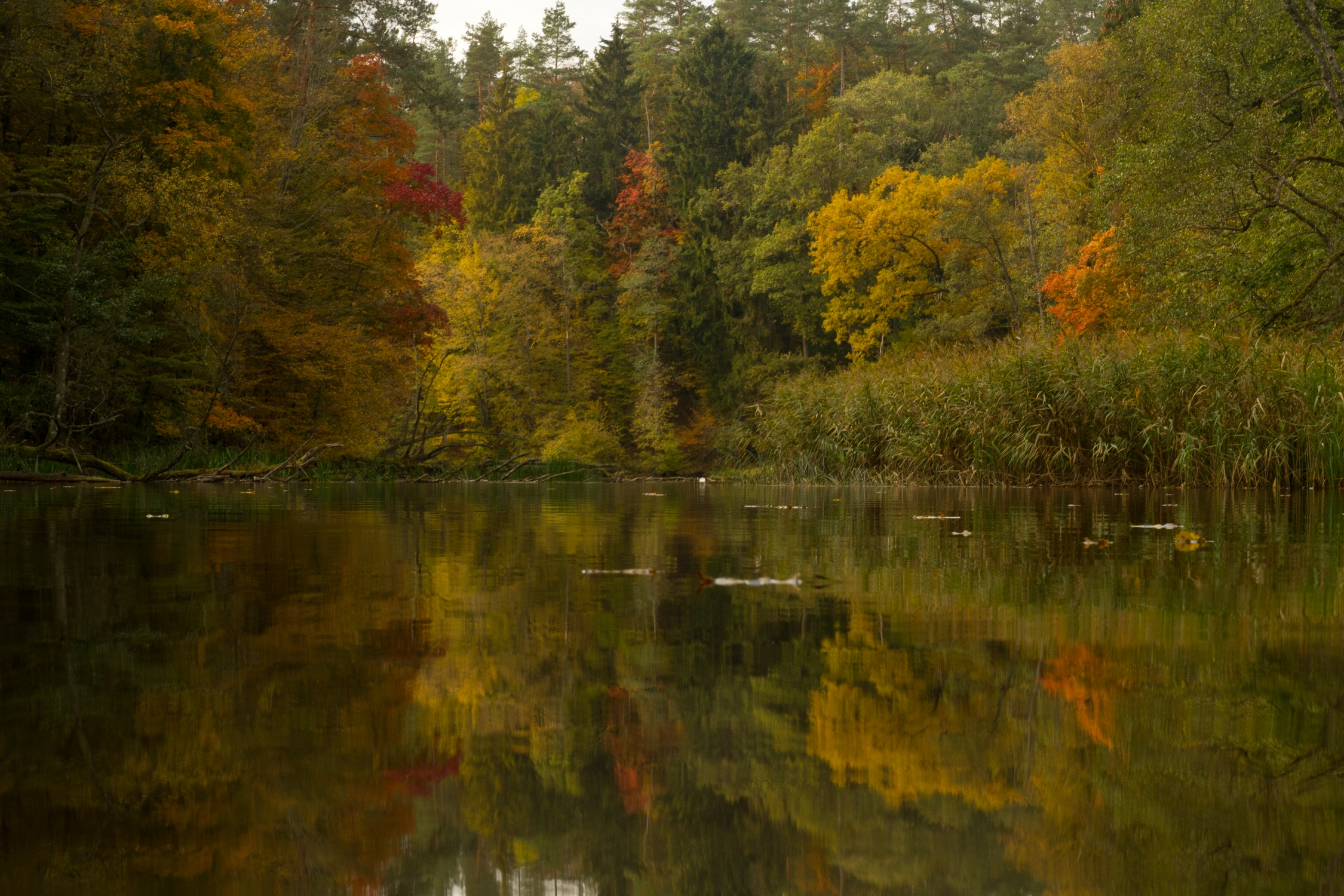
- Krutynia River flowing through the forest

- Location within Poland

Geography
- Location: Poland
- Coordinates: 53.6121°N 21.5163°E

Ecology
- Dominant tree species: pine, spruce

Puszcza Piska Forest or the Pisz Forest (German: Johannisburger Heide) is the largest forest complex of the Masuria region in northern Poland, adjacent to the Masurian Landscape Park, and the Masurian Lowlands. Formerly known as the Jańsborska wilderness, Puszcza Piska bears the name of the Pisa river bordering the Forest along its west bank.

The Pisz Forest consists of a unique combination of coniferous trees, lakes and rivers. Its total area is c.100,000 ha. It covers the communes of Mikołajki, Mrągowo, Piecki, Sorkwity, Biskupiec, Biała Piska, Orzysz, Pisz, Ruciane-Nida, Dźwierzuty, Rozogi, Szczytno, Świętajno, Kolno, Turośl and Łyse. Within its borders are a number of lakes, designated as nature reserves. Among them: Bełdany, Nidzkie, Jegocin, Warnołty nature reserve, Mokre, and the largest lake in Poland called Śniardwy. Two principal rivers flow through the area – Krutynia and Pisa, as well as many smaller tributaries and streams.

== Flora ==
The southern part of the forest grows on sands and lowland bogs. The soil is being drained by the Narew tributaries, including Pisa and Szkwa, as well as many lakes. The northern part of the complex borders on Masurian Lake District known in Polish as Kraina Wielkich Jezior. The Piska Forest consists of pine and spruce groves with the mixture of birch, aspen, maple, alder and oak growing on sandy soil mainly at the southern end of the forest. The best known among the local trees is the "Masurian pine" covering eastern edges of the Mokre lake. It reaches the height of 40 m and the age of 200 years.

== Fauna ==
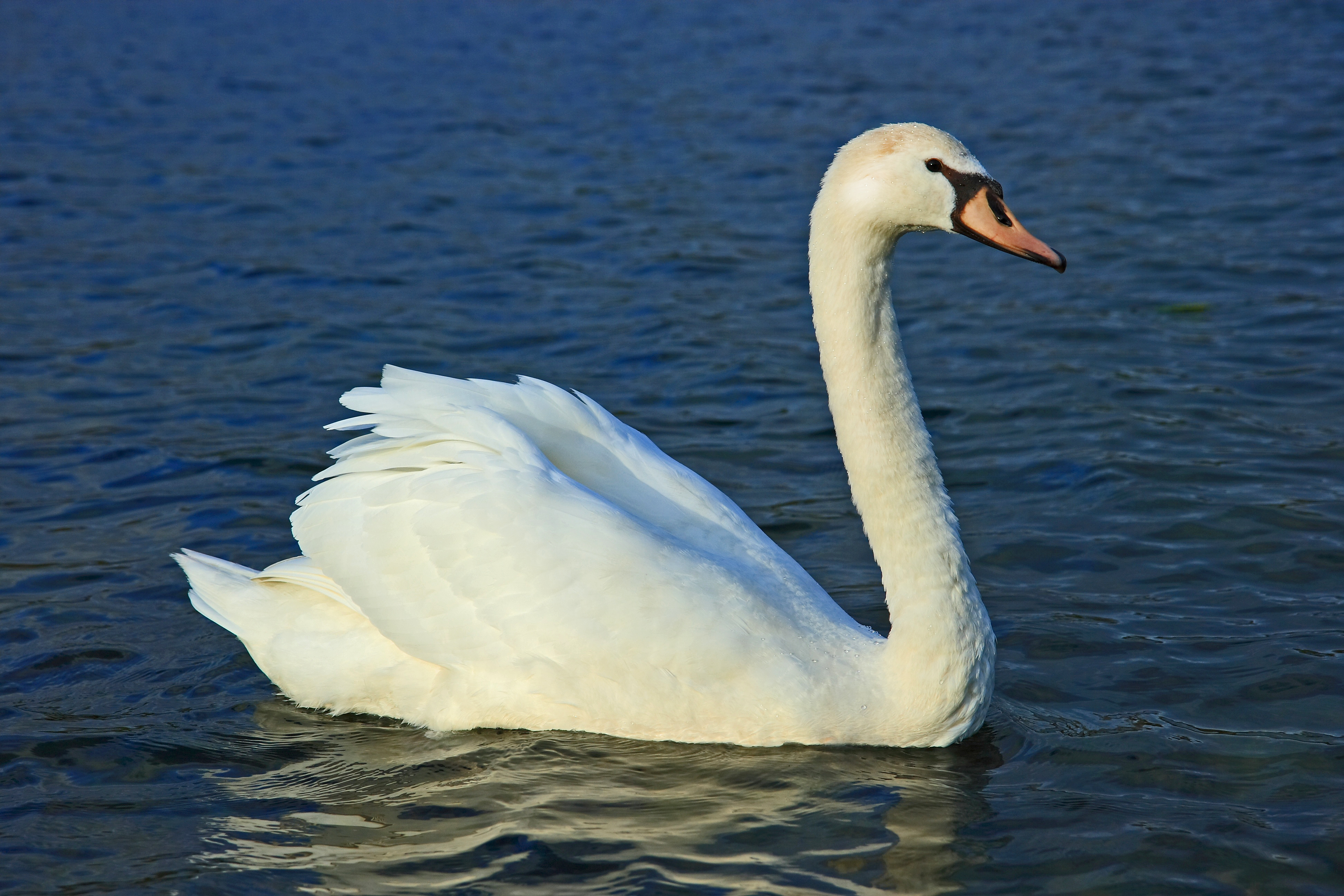
The mute swan

Puszcza Piska is a bird sanctuary on a European scale, featuring eleven nature reserves within its own Masurian Landscape Park (Mazurski Park Krajobrazowy) established in 1977 with the total area of 53,600 ha. The most valuable reserve is located at the Łuknajno Lake near the town of Mikołajki – a Ramsar site designated by UNESCO as a biosphere reserve. It is the home of the mute swan (pictured), native to temperate regions of Europe and western Asia, in time of moult arriving in numbers reaching up to 2,000 birds. Many species of wild animals live in the forest, among them: red deer, roe deer, moose, wild boar, European hare, red fox and recently reintroduced Eurasian lynx. On wetlands, most saturated with water, beaver lodges can be found. The symbol of the park is a white stork with nests scattered over many local villages.

== Gallery ==
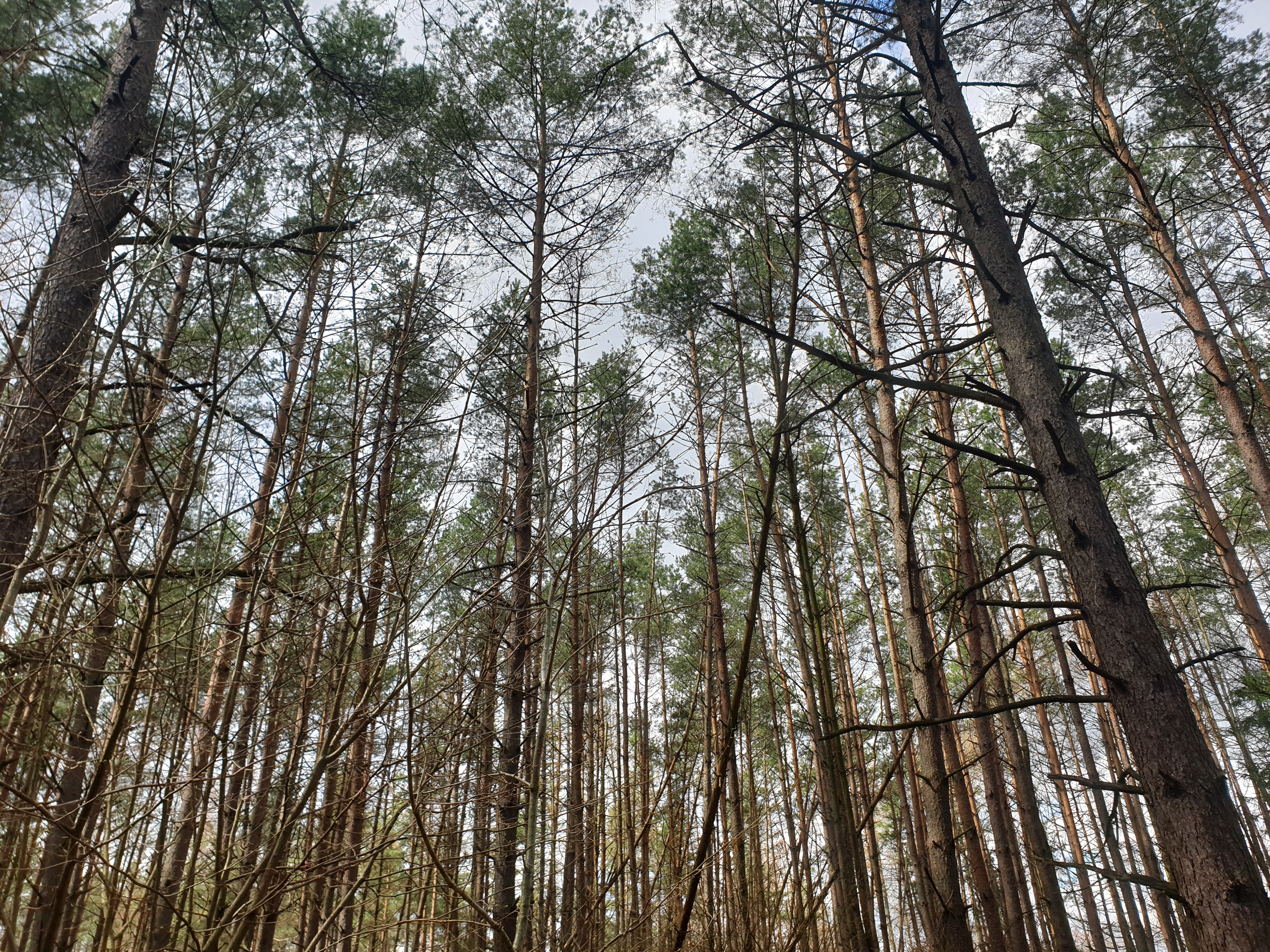
Forest near Stare Kiełbonki

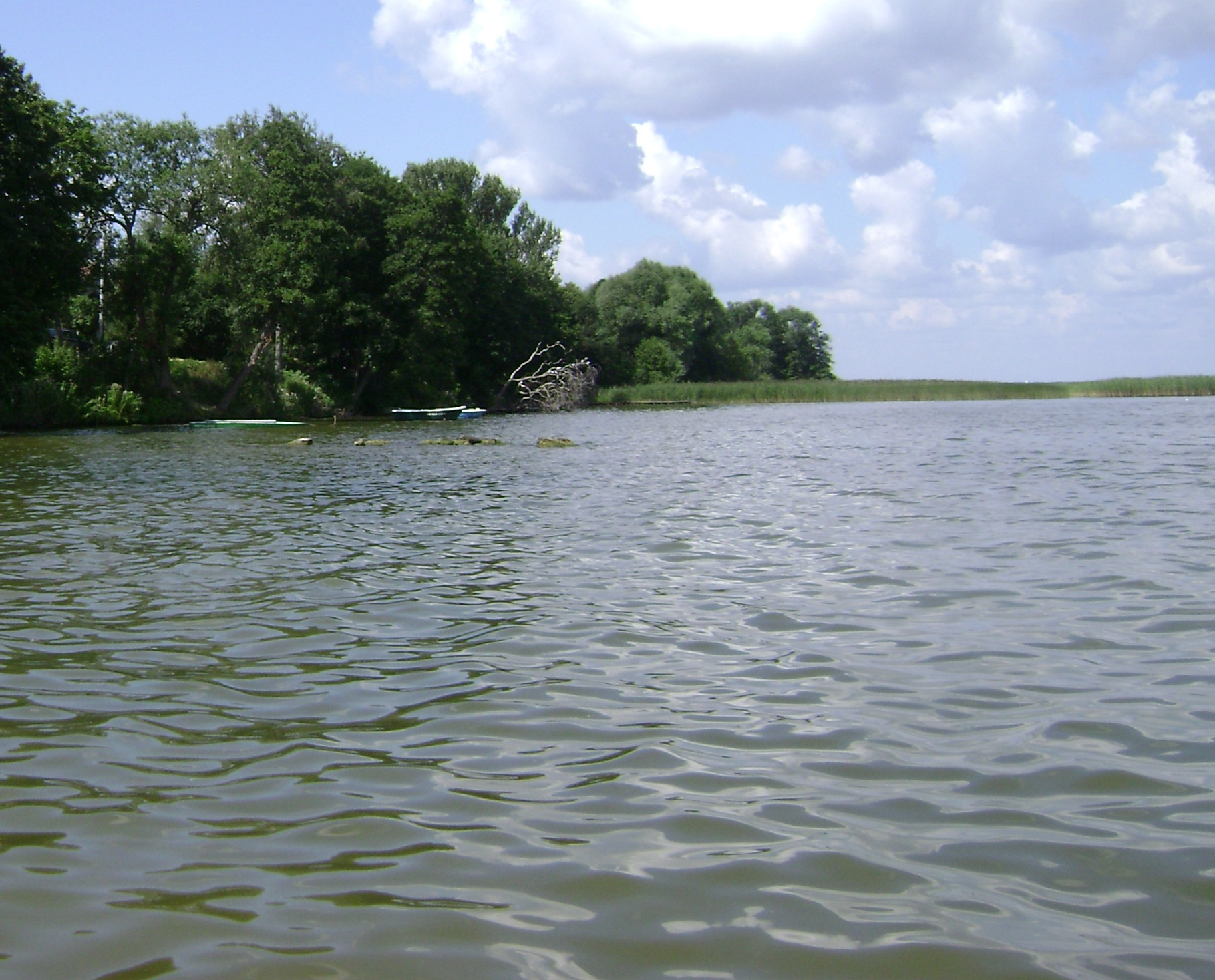
Śniardwy Lake at the Pisz Forest near Ruciane-Nida

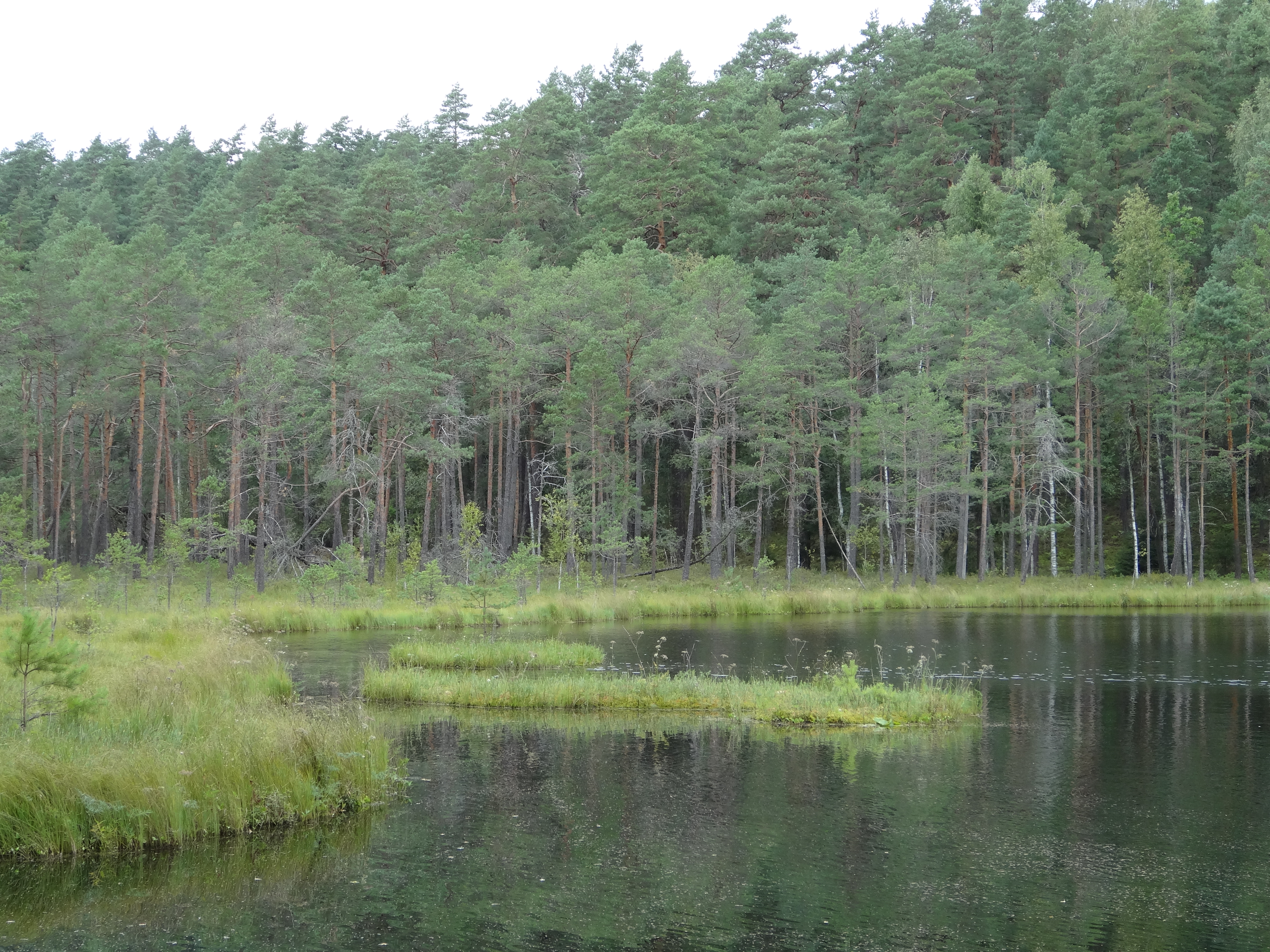
Nature reserve Królewska Sosna

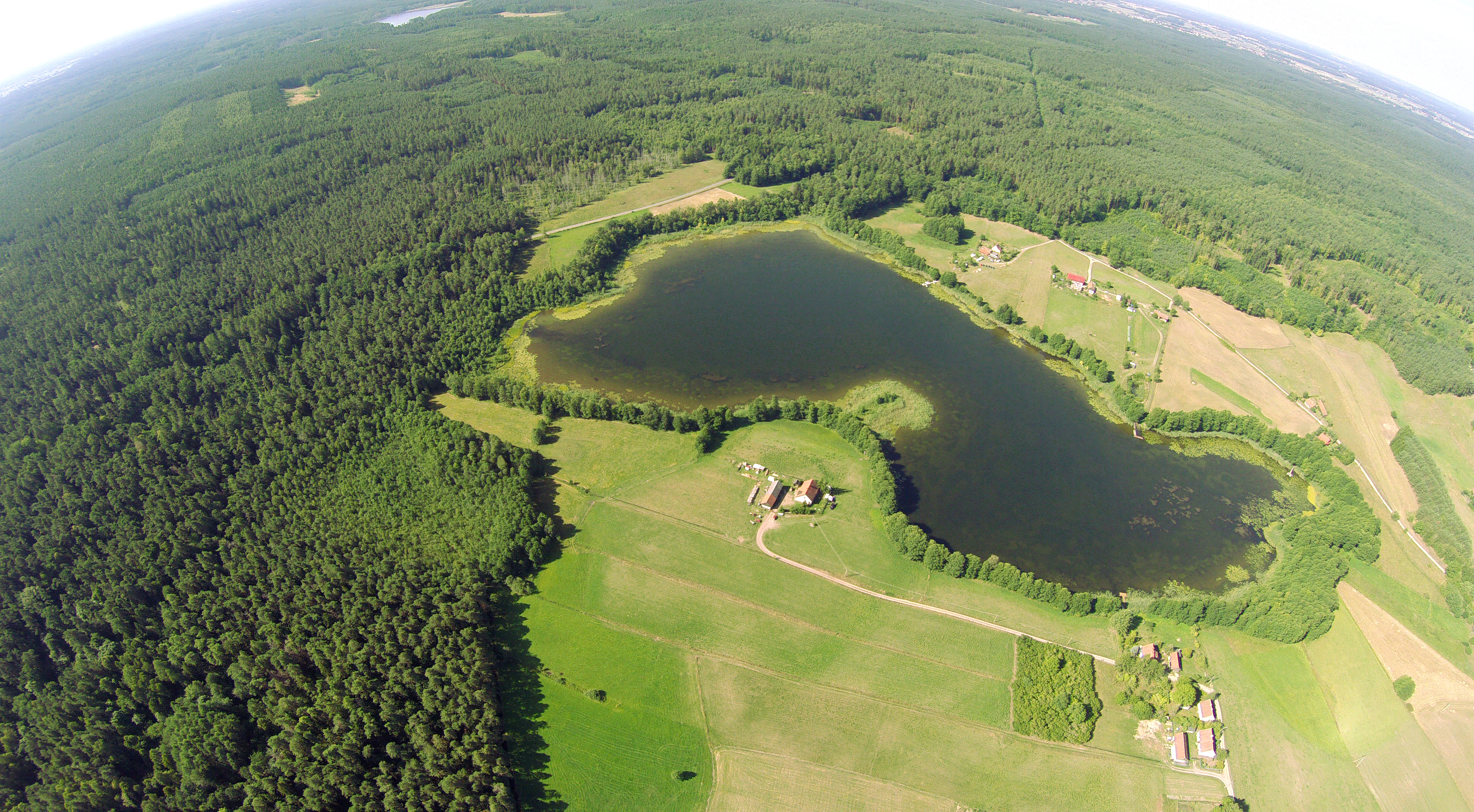
Nature reserve Strzałowo

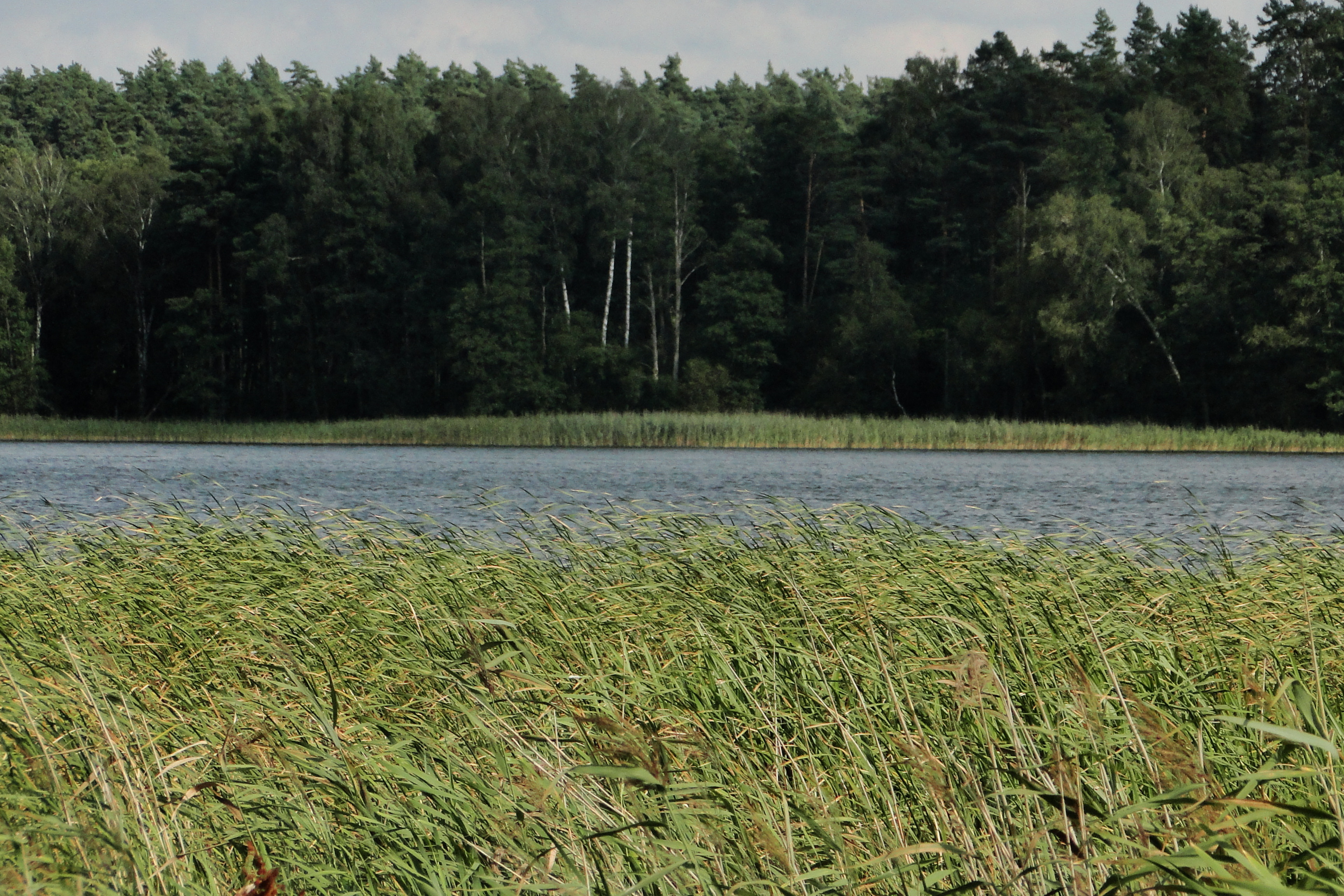
Zdróżno Lake

== See also ==
- Forests of Poland
- Special Protection Areas in Poland
- Natura 2000 in Poland
