= Łuknajno =

Lake in Poland

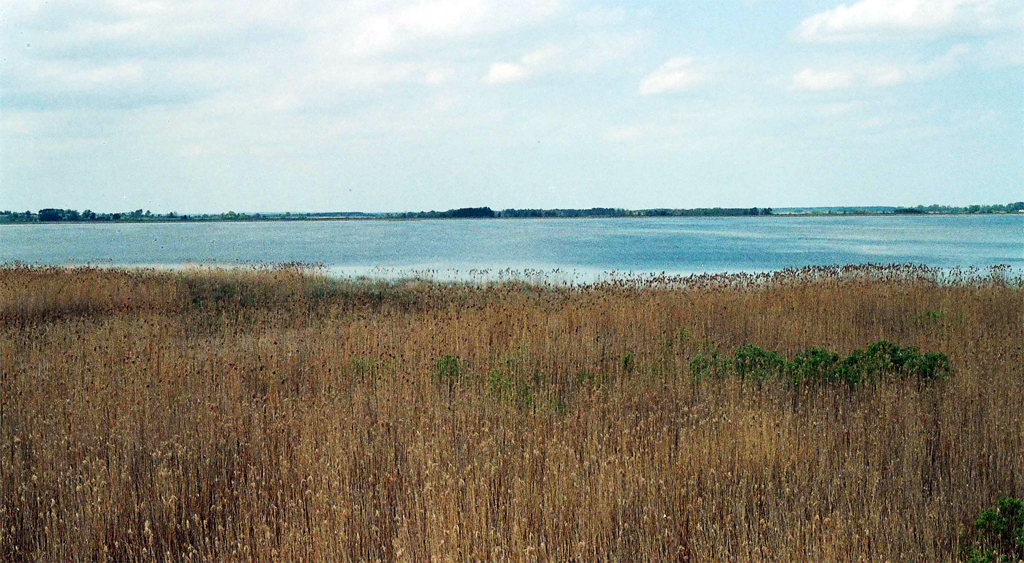
- Łuknajno lake

- Location within Warmian-Masurian Voivodeship
- Location: Masurian Lake District, Warmian-Masurian Voivodeship
- Coordinates: 53°48′19″N 21°38′34″E
- Basin countries: Poland
- Max. length: 3.3 km (2.1 mi)
- Surface area: 6.8 km^{2} (2.6 sq mi)
- Average depth: 0.6 m (2 ft 0 in)
- Max. depth: 3 m (9.8 ft)
- Surface elevation: 115 m (377 ft)

Ramsar Wetland
- Official name: Luknajno Lake Nature Reserve
- Designated: 22 November 1977
- Reference no.: 166

Łuknajno [wukˈnajnɔ] (German : Lucknainer See) is a lake and nature-reserve in the Masurian Lake District of north-eastern Poland, in Warmian-Masurian Voivodeship. Łuknajno also has a forester's lodge situated near its northern shore.

== Łuknajno Lake ==
The lake is the site of a nature reserve. Originally designated a reserve under the Third Reich in 1937, and then also acknowledged as a reserve under the PRL in 1947, since 1977 the lake has been designated a UNESCO Biosphere Reserve and a Ramsar site, in view of its importance as a breeding ground for water birds such as grebe, rail, moorhen, grey heron, bearded tit, white-tailed eagle, osprey, rust-coloured kite, cormorant and black tern. The lake is known since many decades as the habitat of the mute swan (Latin: Cygnus olor) – nesting there every year from a dozen to tens of dozen of pairs, and in time of moult arriving in numbers reaching up to 2,000 birds. The lake is part of the larger protected area known as Masurian Landscape Park.

Łuknajno covers an area of 6.8 square kilometres (2.6 sq mi), and has a maximum depth of 3 metres (9.8 ft). The bottom of the lake is 77% covered with brachiopods (Characeae), potworms (Potamogeton), and spearguns (Myriophyllum). At the banks, there is a strip of reed rush with a small admixture of narrow-leaved cattail and lake bulrush. On the southern and eastern shores, there is a strip of willow thickets and fragments of alders. This creates a favorable shelter for bird nesting and significantly enriches the biotope.

== Forest settlement ==
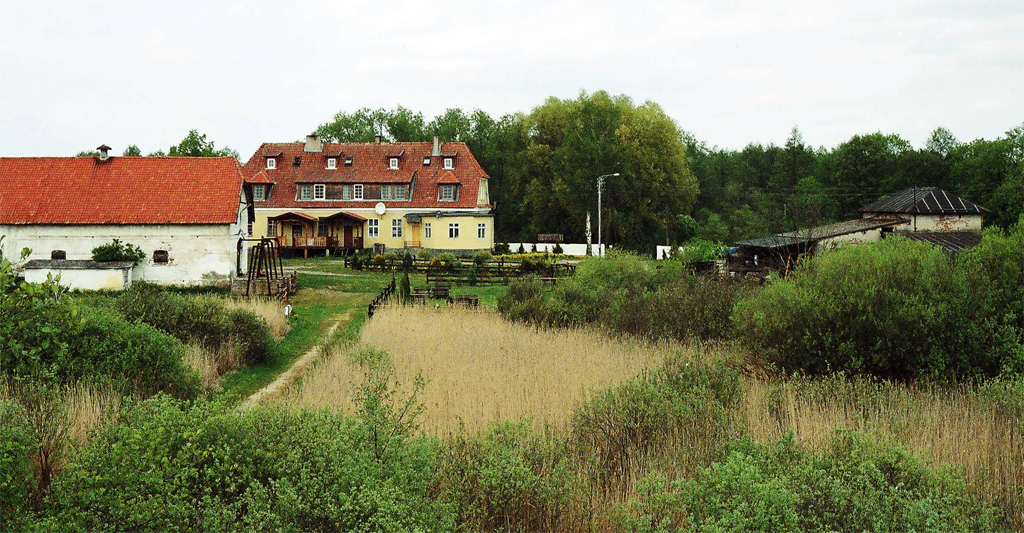
The Manor House at Łuknajno

Originally the site of an inn destroyed by the tartars in 1656, a new inn was established here by Fryderyk Schütz in 1686. By 1838 the site had three houses in which 26 people lived. A manor-house was constructed at the site in the first half of the 19th century. The site was destroyed in the first world war. By 1939 the site was home to 110 people. After the second world war, a state farm and forestry office were established at the site.

Łuknajno is officially classed as a "forest settlement" (Osada lesna).

== See also ==
- Puszcza Piska forest
- Masuria region
