= Gerhard Hoffmann =

Gerhard Hoffmann may refer to:

- Gerhard Hoffmann (physicist) (1880–1945), German nuclear physicist
- Gerhard Hoffmann (pilot) (1919–1945), German pilot
