= Zbigniew Włodkowski =

Polish politician

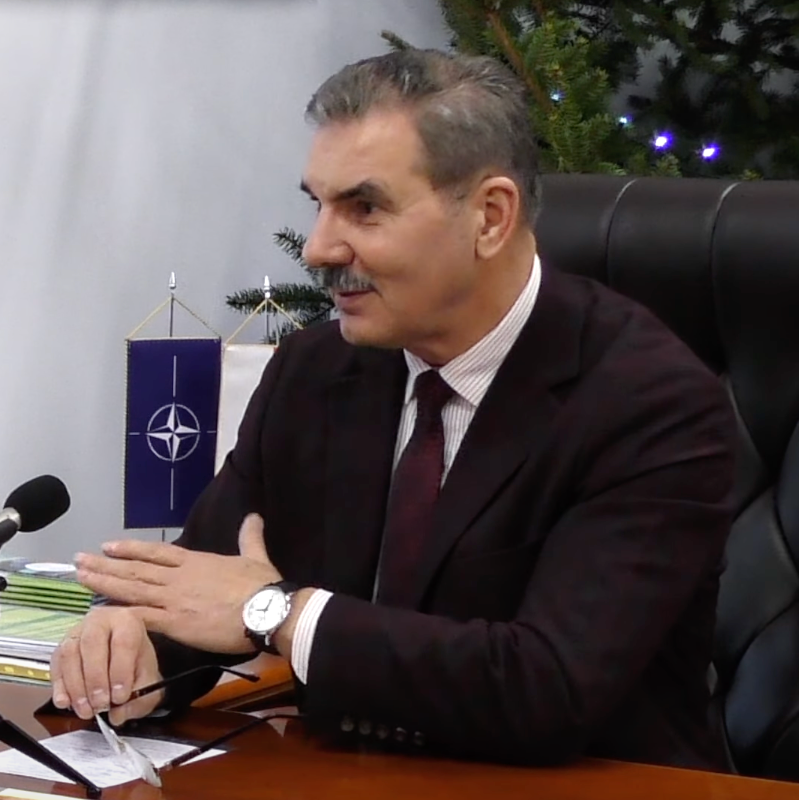
- Zbigniew Włodkowski (2021)

Mayor of Orzysz
- Incumbent
- Assumed office 2 December 2014

Deputy of the Sejm
- In office 2011 – 2 December 2014
- In office 2005 – 2007
- Constituency: 35 Olsztyn

Personal details
- Born: 30 April 1961 (age 64) Pisz, Polish People's Republic
- Party: Polish People's Party

Zbigniew Włodkowski (born 30 April 1961 in Pisz) is a Polish politician. He was elected to the Sejm on 25 September 2005, getting 2842 votes in 35 Olsztyn district as a candidate from the Polish People's Party list. He was MP from 2005 to 2007 and from 2011 to 2014.

== See also ==
- Members of Polish Sejm 2005-2007
