= Pisa (river) =

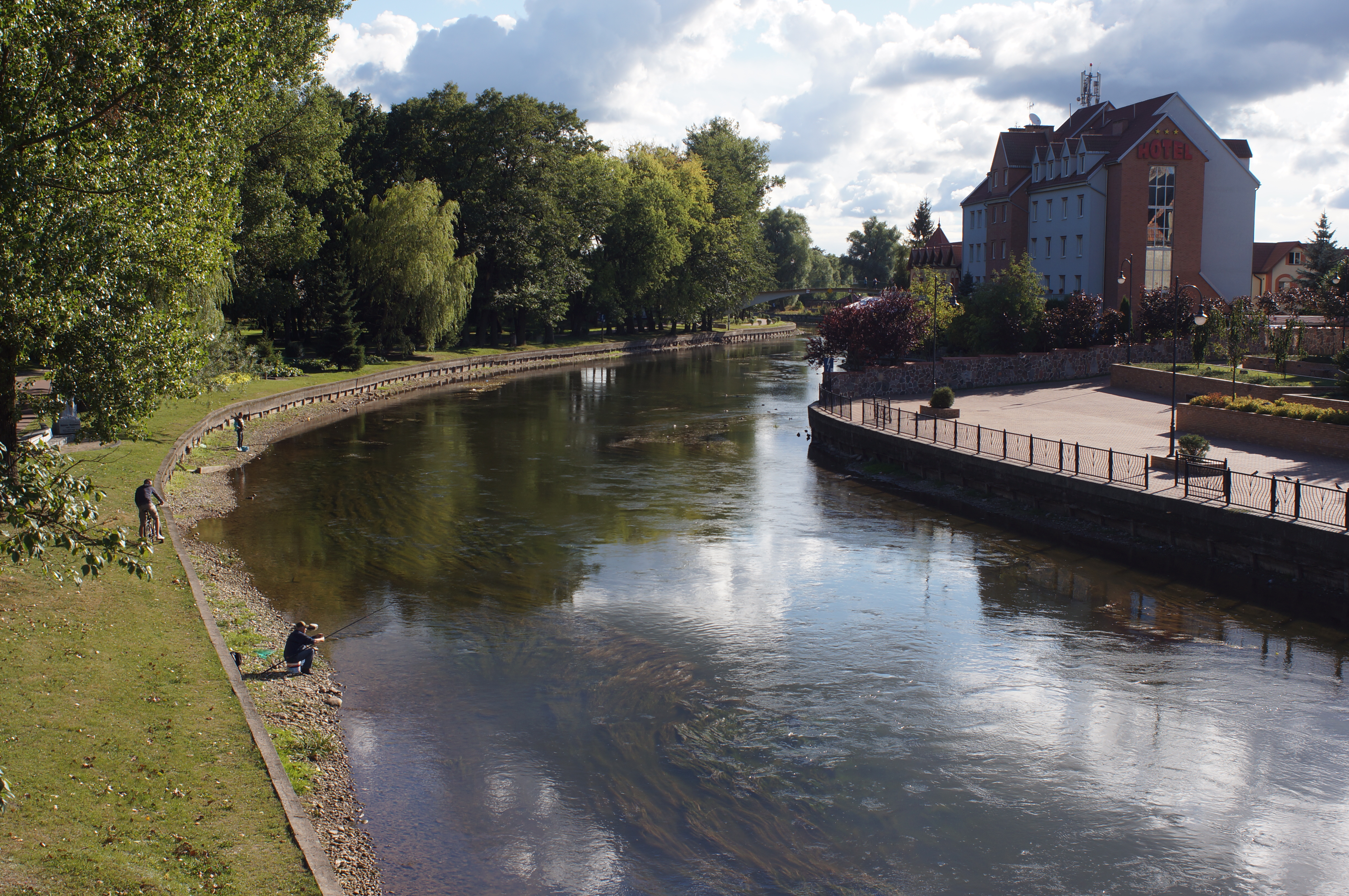
- Pisa River and its surroundings

Location
- Country: Poland

Physical characteristics
- Mouth
  - location: Narew
  - coordinates: 53.2303°N 21.8723°E
- Length: 82 km (51 mi)
- Basin size: 4,510 km^{2} (1,740 sq mi)

Basin features
- Progression: Narew→ Vistula→ Baltic Sea
- River system: Turośl canal, Rybnica, Rudna, Pisza Woda, Wincenta and Skroda

The Pisa (Polish pronunciation: [ˈpisa]; German: Pissek) is a river in north-eastern Poland with a length of 82 km and a basin area of 4,510 km^{2}. It belongs to the Masurian Lake District of the Warmian-Masurian Voivodeship. The Pisa river flows from Lake Roś near the town of Pisz, and is a tributary of the Narew, connecting the Lakeland region with the Vistula. The Pisz Forest borders the river on its west bank.

The name Pisa comes from the ancient Prussian language word "pisa", meaning "swamp." The name dates back to the Galindae tribe who lived in the area before the arrival of the Teutonic Knights, who referred to the Pisa as the Galinde. In November 1982 the Polish Centre for Research and Control of the Environment (Ośrodek Badań i Kontroli Środowiska) in Łomża included Pisa in the first class category for purity of its water.

Pisa is a picturesque lowland river with its most scenic stretches around its upper and lower reaches. In the middle part, the river flows through boggy meadows. Along its entire length Pisa is navigable. Considerably deep (1–1.8 m), it has the shallowest depth at its mouth, at the Narew river. Pisa is strongly meandering with an average descent of 32 cm per kilometer. Canoeing down the river from Pisz to Nowogród takes about 4–5 days.

== Bibliography ==
- W. Brenda, D. Serafin, Piskie ścieżki Rowerowe Informator Turystyczny, Pisz Town Centre, pp. 34–38
