= Wet Lake (Warmia-Masuria Voivodeship) =

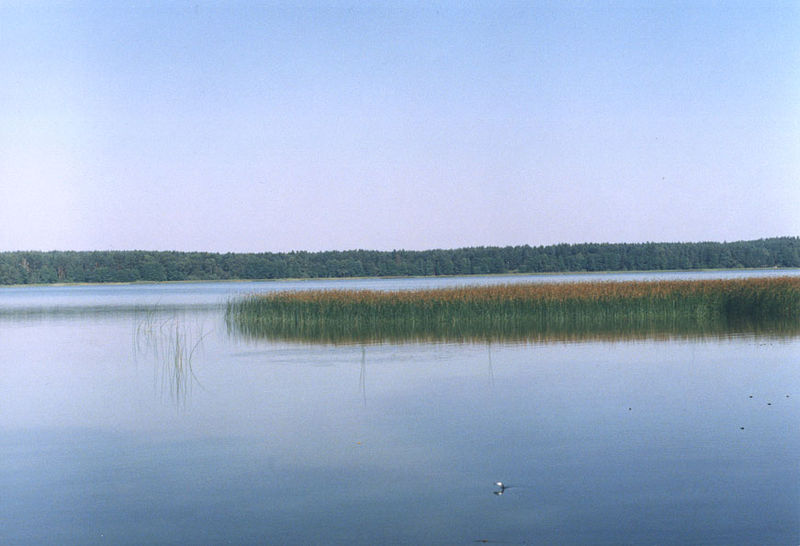

- Location within Warmian-Masurian Voivodeship
- Location: Warmian–Masurian Voivodeship
- Coordinates: 53°41′5″N 21°23′11″E
- Type: ribbon lake
- Basin countries: Poland
- Max. length: 7.7 km (4.8 mi)
- Max. width: 1.6 km (0.99 mi)
- Surface area: 8.46 km^{2} (3.27 sq mi)
- Max. depth: 51 m (167 ft)
- Islands: 5

Wet Lake (Polish: Jezioro Mokre) is a ribbon lake in the Mrągowskie Lakeland of Poland. There are 5 islands in the lake. It is situated in the Masurian Landscape Park near Zgon.

== Statistics ==
- Length: 7.7 km
- Width: 1.6 km
- Area: 846 ha
- Maximum depth: 51 m
