= Gerhard Hoffmann (pilot) =

German World War II fighter pilot (1919–1945)

- Hoffmann as a Leuntnant
- Born: 6 November 1919; Nieden, Eastern Prussia, Germany
- Died: 11 April 1945 (aged 25) near Breslau, Germany
- Military career
- Allegiance: Nazi Germany
- Branch: Luftwaffe
- Rank: Leutnant (second lieutenant)
- Nickname: Fakken
- Unit: JG 52
- Commands: 11./JG 52
- Conflicts: World War II
- Awards: Knight's Cross of the Iron Cross

Gerhard Hoffmann (6 November 1919 – 11 April 1945) was a German Luftwaffe military aviator during World War II, a fighter ace credited with 130 aerial victories—that is, 130 aerial combat encounters resulting in the destruction of the enemy aircraft—claimed in an unknown number of combat missions.

Born in Nieden, Hoffmann was trained as a fighter pilot and was posted to Jagdgeschwader 52 (JG 52—52nd Fighter Wing) in 1942. Fighting on the Eastern Front, he claimed his first aerial victory on 26 October 1942 and his 100th aerial victory on March/April 1944. On 14 May 1944, Hoffmann was awarded the Knight's Cross of the Iron Cross, the highest award in the military and paramilitary forces of Nazi Germany during World War II. He then served as an instructor with Ergänzungs-Jagdgruppe West, a supplementary fighter pilot training unit. On 10 April 1945, he was appointed Staffelkapitän (squadron leader) of 11. Staffel (11th squadron) of JG 52. The following day, Hoffmann was killed in a flight accident near Breslau.

== Career ==
Hoffmann was born on 6 November 1919 in Nieden, present-day part of Ruciane-Nida in Poland, at the time in the Free State of Prussia of the Weimar Republic. Nicknamed "Fakken", he joined the military service of the Luftwaffe and following flight training in June 1942, (Note: Flight training in the Luftwaffe progressed through the levels A1, A2 and B1, B2, referred to as A/B flight training. A training included theoretical and practical training in aerobatics, navigation, long-distance flights and dead-stick landings. The B courses included high-altitude flights, instrument flights, night landings and training to handle the aircraft in difficult situations.) was transferred to the 4. Staffel (4th squadron) of Jagdgeschwader 52 (JG 52—52nd Fighter Wing) on the Eastern Front. At the time, 4. Staffel was commanded by Oberleutnant Gerhard Barkhorn. The Staffel was subordinated to II. Gruppe (2nd group) headed by Hauptmann Johannes Steinhoff.

=== War against the Soviet Union ===
World War II in Europe had begun on Friday 1 September 1939 when German forces invaded Poland. Germany had launched Operation Barbarossa, the invasion of the Soviet Union on 22 June 1941. A year later, German forces launched Operation Fridericus II, the attack on Kupiansk, a preliminary operation to Case Blue, the strategic 1942 summer offensive in southern Russia. On 28 June, the 2nd and 4th Panzer Army began their advance towards the strategically important city of Voronezh on the Don river. The Battle of Voronezh marked the beginning of the German advance towards Stalingrad. By 21 September, II. Gruppe had made several relocations was then based at Maykop located in the North Caucasus. On 24 October, the Gruppe reached an airfield named Soldatskaja located approximately halfway between Mozdok and Pyatigorsk. Flying from this airfield, Hoffmann claimed his first aerial victory on 26 October when he shot down a Lavochkin-Gorbunov-Gudkov LaGG-3 fighter.

On 19 November, Soviet forces launched Operation Uranus which led to the encirclement of Axis forces in the vicinity of Stalingrad. To support the German forces fighting in Stalingrad, II. Gruppe was moved to an airfield at Morozovsk on 26 November. Here on 8 December, Hoffmann claimed two Curtiss P-40 Warhawk fighters shot down southwest of Bassargino, located approximately 20 kilometers (12 miles) east of Karpovka. On 30 December, the Gruppe was ordered to an airfield at Gigant, retreating from the advancing Soviet forces. There, the unit flew ground missions against the Soviet infantry as well as fighter escort missions for Luftwaffe Junkers Ju 87 dive bombers. On 22 January 1943, II. Gruppe had to retreat further and moved to an airfield at Rostov-on-Don. Operating from Rostov, Hoffmann claimed an aerial victory of Lavochkin La-5 fighter on 25 January.

=== Kuban bridgehead ===
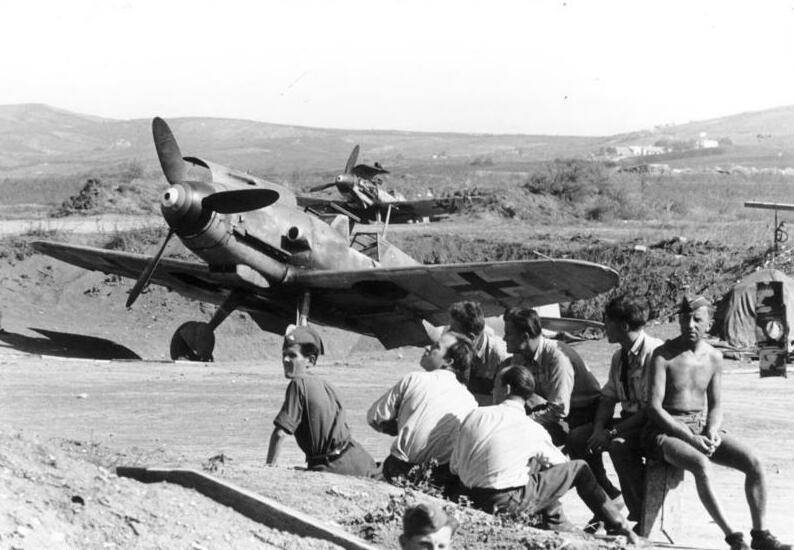
Bf 109s of II./JG 52 at Anapa

The Gruppe was moved to the combat area of the Kuban bridgehead on 10 February 1943 where it was initially based at an airfield at Slavyansk-na-Kubani. Due to whether conditions, II. Gruppe then moved to Kerch on 16 February. There, Hoffmann claimed a Polikarpov R-5 shot down on 28 February. On 3 March, he was credited with destruction of a Yakovlev Yak-1 fighter followed by a LaGG-3 fighter two days later. On 13 March, the Gruppe moved to Anapa located on the northern coast of the Black Sea near the Sea of Azov and was fighting in the Battle of the Caucasus. According to Barbas, Hoffmann had increased his total number of aerial victories claimed to sixteen by the end of April 1943. While authors Prien, Stemmer, Rodeike and Bock, as well as authors Mathews and Foreman, list him with a total of 15 aerial victories in that timeframe. The discrepancies stem from aerial combat on 20 April. According to Barbas, Hoffmann shot down two Yak-1 fighters and a LaGG-3 fighter. The other authors list him with just two victories claimed that day, one Yak-1 fighter and one LaGG-3 fighter. By end of June, depending on source, his number of aerial victories increased to 26 or 25 respectively.

On 5 July, elements of II. Gruppe left the Anapa airfield and moved to an airfield at Gostagaevskaya located approximately 20 kilometers (12 miles) northeast Anapa, and to Yevpatoriya on 12 July while the bulk of the Gruppe remained in Anapa. On 1 August 1943, Oberleutnant Heinrich Sturm succeeded Barkhorn as commander of 4. Staffel while Barkhorn was given command of II. Gruppe of JG 52. Again depending on source, Hoffmann increased his aerial victories to either 31 or to 30 by the end of August. On 27 August, II. Gruppe moved to an airfield at Bolschaya Rudka located approximately 19 kilometers (12 miles) north-northwest of Poltava. Here, the Gruppe fought at Izium and Kharkov, providing fighter escort for Ju 87 dive bombers, Junkers Ju 88 and Heinkel He 111 bombers, and Henschel Hs 129 ground-attack aircraft. On 1 September, the Gruppe was ordered to Karlivka, approximately 50 kilometers (31 miles) east-southeast of Poltava, where they stayed until 10 September, moving to an airfield north of Poltava. On 18 September, II. Gruppe moved again, then operating from an airfield south of Kiev. In September, Hoffmann's number of aerial victories stood at 43 claimed. On 25 September 1943, Hoffmann was shot down in aerial combat in his Messerschmitt Bf 109 G-6 (Werknummer 20127—factory number) 10 kilometers (6.2 miles) west of Pereiaslav. He was wounded, grounding him for some time.

=== Crimea ===
II./JG 52 insignia

During his convalescence period, Hoffmann was awarded the German Cross in Gold (Deutsches Kreuz in Gold) on 12 December. He then returned to 4. Staffel of JG 52 and claimed his 43rd/44th—depending on source—aerial victory on 7 February 1944 over a Bell P-39 Airacobra fighter aircraft near Kerch. According to Obermaier, he claimed his 100th aerial victory on 16 March 1944 over the Crimea, which would make him the 65th Luftwaffe pilot to achieve the century mark. According to Barbas, as well as Mathews and Foreman, Hoffmann claimed his 100th aerial victory on 22 April 1944. On 8 April, Soviet forces had launched the Crimean offensive, forcing the Germans to evacuate the Crimea. On the first day of the operation, Hoffmann became an "ace-in-a-day" for the first time, claiming four Ilyushin Il-2 ground-attack aircraft and a Yak-1 fighter. The following day, he again claimed five aerial victories, making him and "ace-in-day" for the second time. On 17 and 18 April, Hoffmann claimed five and six aerial victories near Sevastopol, making him a four-time "ace-in-day". On 4 May 1944, 15 Bf 109s from II. Gruppe intercepted 24 Il-2 ground-attack aircraft from 8 GShAP (8th Guards Ground-attack Aviation Regiment) and 47 GShAP (47th Ground-attack Aviation Regiment), escorted by 23 fighter aircraft, over the Black Sea. In this encounter, pilots from II. Gruppe claimed six aerial victories, including two Il-2s by Hoffmann, without sustaining any losses. However, Soviet records only document the loss of three Il-2s and one Yakovlev Yak-9 fighter.

He once more became an "ace-in-day" on 7 May, taking his total to 121 aerial victories claimed, making him a five-time "ace-in-day". For these achievements, Hoffmann was awarded the Knight's Cross of the Iron Cross (Ritterkreuz des Eisernen Kreuzes) on 14 May 1944 for 125 aerial victories claimed. While 4. Staffel was withdrawn from the Eastern Front and subordinated to Jagdgeschwader 3 "Udet" (JG 3—3rd Fighter Wing) fighting on the Western Front, Hoffmann was transferred to the Ergänzungs-Jagdgruppe West, a supplementary fighter pilot training unit, in May 1944. There, he served as a fighter pilot instructor and was promoted to Leutnant (second lieutenant).

=== Squadron leader and death ===
Hoffmann was appointed Staffelkapitän (squadron leader) of the 4. Staffel of Ergänzungs-Jagdgeschwader 1 (EJG 1—1st Supplementary Fighter Wing), a Luftwaffe replacement training unit, on 1 November 1944. According to Obermaier, he claimed four aerial victories in March 1945 at the Oder while serving with EJG 1. Mathews and Foreman only list two aerial victories over Yakovlev Yak-3 fighters claimed on 8 March. In March/April 1945, EJG 1 was disbanded and its pilots were assigned to other Jagdgeschwader.

On 10 April, Hoffmann was made Staffelkapitän of the 11. Staffel of JG 52. He succeeded Oberleutnant Ludwig Neuböck who was transferred. (Note: According to Schreier, Hoffmann was already given command of 11. Staffel of JG 52 on 15 March 1945.) The Staffel was subordinated to III. Gruppe of JG 52 and was headed by Major Adolf Borchers. The Gruppe had been based at Schweidnitz, present-day Świdnica in south-western Poland, since 16 March 1945. Hoffmann claimed his only aerial victory with 11. Staffel on 10 April when he shot down a P-39 fighter. The following day, he shuttled Bf 109 G-14 (Werknummer 785937) to Breslau, present-day Wrocław in southwestern Poland. On that flight, he collided with his wingman, Unteroffizier Richard Geiger, both pilots died in the accident.

== Summary of career ==
=== Aerial victory claims ===
According to US historian David T. Zabecki, Hoffmann was credited with 130 aerial victories. Obermaier also lists Hoffmann with 130 aerial victories claimed in an unknown number of combat missions. He was also credited with the destruction of 128 vehicles of all types flying ground support missions. According to Spick, his total of aerial victories was 125 all of which claimed on the Eastern Front. Mathews and Foreman, authors of Luftwaffe Aces — Biographies and Victory Claims, researched the German Federal Archives and found records for 130 aerial victory claims recorded on the Eastern Front.

Victory claims were logged to a map-reference (PQ = Planquadrat), for example "PQ 43661". The Luftwaffe grid map (Jägermeldenetz) covered all of Europe, western Russia and North Africa and was composed of rectangles measuring 15 minutes of latitude by 30 minutes of longitude, an area of about 360 square miles (930 km^{2}). These sectors were then subdivided into 36 smaller units to give a location area 3 km × 4 km (1.9 mi × 2.5 mi) in size.

Chronicle of aerial victories
This and the ♠ (Ace of spades) indicates those aerial victories which made Hoffmann an ace-in-a-day, a term which designates a fighter pilot who has shot down five or more airplanes in a single day. This and the ? (question mark) indicates information discrepancies listed by Barbas, Prien, Stemmer, Rodeike, Bock, Mathews and Foreman.
Claim	Date	Time	Type	Location	Unit	Claim	Date	Time	Type	Location	Unit
– Claims with II. Gruppe of Jagdgeschwader 52 – Eastern Front — June 1942 – 3 February 1943
1	26 October 1942	13:18	LaGG-3	PQ 43661	4./JG 52	3	8 December 1942	11:53	P-40	PQ 49314; 10 km (6.2 mi) southwest of Bassargino	4./JG 52
2	8 December 1942	11:47	P-40	PQ 49383; 25 km (16 mi) south of Bassargino	4./JG 52	4	25 January 1943	14:15	La-5	PQ 18781	4./JG 52
– Claims with II. Gruppe of Jagdgeschwader 52 – Eastern Front — 4 February – 31 December 1943
5	28 February 1943	08:55	R-5	PQ 34 Ost 86652 vicinity of Weressy	4./JG 52	24	5 June 1943	13:06	Yak-1	PQ 34 Ost 86761 vicinity of Fedorowskaja	4./JG 52
6	3 March 1943	15:05	Yak-1	PQ 34 Ost 86312 south Stepnanja	4./JG 52	25	8 June 1943	12:14	Yak-1	PQ 34 Ost 75494; Black Sea, 10 km (6.2 mi) southwest of Gelendzhik	4./JG 52
7	5 March 1943	06:55	LaGG-3	PQ 34 Ost 66643 east of Bakssy	4./JG 52	26	23 August 1943	10:48	Spitfire	PQ 34 Ost 75352; Black Sea, south of Anapa	4./JG 52
8	30 March 1943	15:10	LaGG-3	PQ 34 Ost 76653 west of Petrovskaya	4./JG 52	27	26 August 1943	13:30	P-39	PQ 34 Ost 88274; 15 km (9.3 mi) west-southwest of Jalisawehino	4./JG 52
9	19 April 1943	11:07	Yak-1	PQ 34 Ost 85241; Black Sea, southwest of Oliginka	5./JG 52	28	28 August 1943	15:15	La-5	PQ 35 Ost 41644; 25 km (16 mi) west-northwest of Okhtyrka	4./JG 52
10	20 April 1943	15:49? (Note: According to Mathews and Foreman claimed at 15:48.)	Yak-1	PQ 34 Ost 75453; Black Sea, 10 km (6.2 mi) south of Novorossiysk	5./JG 52	29	28 August 1943	15:20	Yak-1	PQ 35 Ost 41633; 10 km (6.2 mi) north of Okhtyrka	4./JG 52
11	20 April 1943	15:58	LaGG-3	PQ 34 Ost 75462 vicinity of Kabardinka	5./JG 52	30	29 August 1943	06:48	Yak-1	PQ 35 Ost 60142; 15 km (9.3 mi) southwest of Kharkiv	4./JG 52
12	21 April 1943	10:54	P-40	PQ 34 Ost 75431; 3 km (1.9 mi) southeast of Novorossiysk	4./JG 52	31	5 September 1943	08:01	Yak-1	PQ 35 Ost 50212; 20 km (12 mi) south-southeast of Bohodukhiv	4./JG 52
13	21 April 1943	11:04	Il-2	PQ 34 Ost 75423 southwest of Novorossiysk	4./JG 52	32	5 September 1943	14:32	Yak-1	PQ 35 Ost 60354; 15 km (9.3 mi) southeast of Taranovka	4./JG 52
14	21 April 1943	11:12	Il-2	PQ 34 Ost 75463 southwest of Kabardinka	4./JG 52	33	6 September 1943	10:25	Il-2 m.H. (Note: The "m.H." refers to an Ilyushin Il-2 with rear gunner (mit Heckschütze).)	PQ 35 Ost 50464; 15 km (9.3 mi) southwest of Taranovka	4./JG 52
15	29 April 1943	08:44	Yak-1	PQ 34 Ost 85112 east of Krymsk	4./JG 52	34	7 September 1943	17:00	Pe-2	PQ 35 Ost 50241; 25 km (16 mi) southwest of Olshany	4./JG 52
16	3 May 1943	09:34	Yak-1	west of Mingrelskaja	4./JG 52	35	8 September 1943	09:35	La-5	PQ 35 Ost 41724; 40 km (25 mi) south-southwest of Lebedyn	4./JG 52
17	8 May 1943	09:20	Yak-1	PQ 34 Ost 75234 vicinity of Krymsk	4./JG 52	36	8 September 1943	14:07	La-5	PQ 35 Ost 41724; 40 km (25 mi) south-southwest of Lebedyn	4./JG 52
18	15 May 1943	11:20	Yak-1	PQ 34 Ost 75264, south of Krymskaya east of Nowo-Bakanskoja	4./JG 52	37	20 September 1943	17:24	La-5	PQ 35 Ost 12892 vicinity of Neshin	4./JG 52
19	25 May 1943	08:05	Spitfire	PQ 34 Ost 76642 northeast of Temryuk	4./JG 52	38	21 September 1943	12:12	Yak-1	PQ 35 Ost 11123; 20 km (12 mi) northwest of Kobyshtscha	4./JG 52
20	27 May 1943	13:19	Yak-1	PQ 34 Ost 76894 vicinity of Kijewakoye	4./JG 52	39	21 September 1943	12:16	Yak-1	PQ 35 Ost 11154; 20 km (12 mi) west-northwest of Kobyshtscha	4./JG 52
21	28 May 1943	05:58	Yak-1	PQ 34 Ost 76863 north of Kessjetowa	4./JG 52	40	21 September 1943	12:23	Yak-1	PQ 35 Ost 11183; 15 km (9.3 mi) west of Kobyshtscha	4./JG 52
22	31 May 1943	04:20	Yak-1	PQ 34 Ost 86772 south of Trojzkaja	4./JG 52	41	21 September 1943	12:27	Yak-1	PQ 35 Ost 11174; 30 km (19 mi) west of Kobyshtscha	4./JG 52
23	1 June 1943	07:17	Pe-2	PQ 34 Ost 86781 vicinity of Ssokolowskij	4./JG 52	42	25 September 1943	10:20	Yak-1	PQ 35 Ost 11793; 10 km (6.2 mi) east of Perejaslav-Chmelnicki	4./JG 52
– Claims with II. Gruppe of Jagdgeschwader 52 – Eastern Front — 1 January – 31 December 1944
43	7 February 1944	07:05	P-39	vicinity of Kerch	4./JG 52	85	16 April 1944	15:58	P-39	PQ 35454; 15 km (9.3 mi) east of Sevastopol	4./JG 52
44	10 February 1944	12:50	Yak-9	vicinity of Kolonka	4./JG 52	86♠	17 April 1944	06:44	Yak-7	PQ 35284; 25 km (16 mi) north-northeast of Sevastopol	4./JG 52
45	10 February 1944	13:00	Yak-9	vicinity of Kerch	4./JG 52	87♠	17 April 1944	12:35	Il-2	vicinity of Dzhankoi; 15 km (9.3 mi) east of Sevastopol	4./JG 52
46	12 February 1944	08:52	Yak-7	PQ 66614 vicinity of Majak-Bakny	4./JG 52	88♠	17 April 1944	12:42	Il-2	PQ 35423; 20 km (12 mi) northeast of Sevastopol	4./JG 52
47	12 February 1944	13:00	Yak-1	PQ 36234; 25 km (16 mi) near Perekop	4./JG 52	89♠	17 April 1944	13:05	Pe-2	PQ 35423; 20 km (12 mi) northeast of Sevastopol	4./JG 52
48	12 February 1944	14:35	Yak-1	PQ 66812 vicinity of Taman	4./JG 52	90♠	17 April 1944	16:03	Yak-7	PQ 35283; 25 km (16 mi) north-northeast of Sevastopol	4./JG 52
49	28 February 1944	14:10	LaGG-3	PQ 66591 vicinity of Kerch	4./JG 52	91♠	18 April 1944	09:51	P-39	PQ 35433; 25 km (16 mi) east-northeast of Sevastopol	4./JG 52
50	2 March 1944	13:50	Yak-1	PQ 66641 east of Bulganak	4./JG 52	92♠	18 April 1944	09:53	P-39	west of Belbek; Black Sea, 35 km (22 mi) west-northwest of Sevastopol	4./JG 52
51	2 March 1944	14:01	Yak-1	PQ 66641 east of Bulganak	4./JG 52	93♠	18 April 1944	12:48	Il-2	PQ 35363; Black Sea, 10 km (6.2 mi) west of Sevastopol	4./JG 52
52	11 March 1944	08:40	Yak-7	PQ 37863; 30 km (19 mi) east of Perekop	4./JG 52	94♠	18 April 1944	13:01	Il-2	PQ 35362; Black Sea, 10 km (6.2 mi) west of Sevastopol	4./JG 52
53	11 March 1944	11:32	Yak-7	PQ 47784; 40 km (25 mi) north of Dzhankoi	4./JG 52	95♠	18 April 1944	16:25	Yak-7	vicinity of Belbek	4./JG 52
54	11 March 1944	13:45	Yak-9	PQ 55524; Black Sea, 80 km (50 mi) east of Yalta	4./JG 52	96♠	18 April 1944	16:34	Il-2	vicinity of Belbek vicinity of Sevastopol	4./JG 52
55	11 March 1944	14:00	Yak-9	PQ 65142; Black Sea, south of Kiptschak	4./JG 52	97	19 April 1944	12:37	Yak-7	vicinity of Balaklava; Black Sea, 10 km (6.2 mi) south of Sevastopol	4./JG 52
56	17 March 1944	08:47	Yak-7	PQ 47742; 30 km (19 mi) south of Dornburg	4./JG 52	98	22 April 1944	08:35	Il-2	PQ 25533; 10 km (6.2 mi) north of Schatalowka	4./JG 52
57	1 April 1944	14:45	Yak-7	PQ 65152; Black Sea, south of Tschekur-Kojasch	4./JG 52	99	22 April 1944	08:38	Il-2	PQ 25533; 10 km (6.2 mi) north of Schatalowka	4./JG 52
58	1 April 1944	14:54	Yak-7	PQ 65211; Black Sea, southeast of Cape Takyl	4./JG 52	100	22 April 1944	08:43	Il-2	PQ 25361; 25 km (16 mi) southeast of Smolensk	4./JG 52
59	2 April 1944	09:45	P-39	PQ 66663 vicinity of Zaporozhye	4./JG 52	101	22 April 1944	13:48	Il-2	PQ 35344; Black Sea, 35 km (22 mi) west of Sevastopol	4./JG 52
60	2 April 1944	13:02	La-5	vicinity of Kolonka vicinity of Kolonka	4./JG 52	102	23 April 1944	08:50	Yak-7	PQ 35452; 15 km (9.3 mi) east of Sevastopol	4./JG 52
61	5 April 1944	17:05	Yak-1	PQ 47783; 40 km (25 mi) north of Dzhankoi	4./JG 52	103	24 April 1944	14:37	Il-2	north of Balaklava; 10 km (6.2 mi) south of Sevastopol	4./JG 52
62	7 April 1944	11:40	Yak-1	PQ 46122 vicinity of Tomaschewka	4./JG 52	104	25 April 1944	14:32	P-39	north of Balaklava; 10 km (6.2 mi) south of Sevastopol	4./JG 52
63♠	8 April 1944	10:50	Yak-1	PQ 47773 vicinity of Tachigary	4./JG 52	105	26 April 1944	14:25	Yak-7	PQ 35452; 15 km (9.3 mi) east of Sevastopol	4./JG 52
64♠	8 April 1944	10:55	Il-2	PQ 47771 south of Gromovka	4./JG 52	106	28 April 1944	13:32	Yak-7	vicinity of Dzhankoi; 15 km (9.3 mi) east of Sevastopol	4./JG 52
65♠	8 April 1944	10:58	Il-2	PQ 47773 vicinity of Tachigary	4./JG 52	107	30 April 1944	16:05	Il-2	vicinity of Chersones; Black Sea, west-northwest of Chersones	4./JG 52
66♠	8 April 1944	13:38	Il-2	east of An-Najman	4./JG 52	108	30 April 1944	16:18	Yak-7	PQ 3531; 10 km (6.2 mi) north of Rechytsa	4./JG 52
67♠	8 April 1944	13:45	Il-2	PQ 47773 vicinity of Tachigary	4./JG 52	109	30 April 1944	16:28	Il-2	PQ 3538; 10 km (6.2 mi) north of Rechytsa	4./JG 52
68♠	9 April 1944	09:08	Yak-1	PQ 37854 vicinity of Perekop	4./JG 52	110	4 May 1944	06:38	Il-2	vicinity of Chersones; Black Sea, west-northwest of Chersones	4./JG 52
69♠	9 April 1944	09:11	Il-2	PQ 37853 vicinity of Perekop	4./JG 52	111	4 May 1944	06:47	Il-2	PQ 35342; Black Sea, 40 km (25 mi) southwest of Eupatorja	4./JG 52
70♠	9 April 1944	14:08	Yak-7	PQ 46121 vicinity of Tomaschewka	4./JG 52	112	4 May 1944	13:14	Yak-7	vicinity of Balaklava; 10 km (6.2 mi) south of Sevastopol	4./JG 52
71♠	9 April 1944	17:42? (Note: According to Mathews and Foreman claimed at 17:48.)	Yak-7	vicinity of An-Najman	4./JG 52	113	5 May 1944	10:52	Il-2	vicinity of Akhis	4./JG 52
72♠	9 April 1944	17:48	Yak-7	vicinity of An-Najman	4./JG 52	114	5 May 1944	14:16	Il-2	vicinity of Belbek	4./JG 52
73	10 April 1944	08:18	Yak-7	Tomaschewka	4./JG 52	115	6 May 1944	13:58	Yak-7	PQ 35332; Black Sea, 15 km (9.3 mi) northwest of Sevastopol	4./JG 52
74	10 April 1944	12:22	P-39	PQ 46124 vicinity of Tomaschewka	4./JG 52? (Note: According to Mathews and Foreman claimed with 6./Jagdgeschwder 52.)	116♠	7 May 1944	07:21? (Note: According to Mathews and Foreman claimed at 07:20.)	Il-2	PQ 35362; Black Sea, 10 km (6.2 mi) west of Sevastopol	4./JG 52
75	10 April 1944	18:03	Yak-7	PQ 47771 south of Gromovka	4./JG 52	117♠? (Note: This claim is not listed by Barbas.)	7 May 1944	07:28	Il-2	Black Sea, 10 km (6.2 mi) west of Sevastopol	4./JG 52
76	11 April 1944	06:12	Yak-7	PQ 46121 vicinity of Tomaschewka	4./JG 52	118♠	7 May 1944	11:08	Il-2	vicinity of Balaklava; Black Sea, 10 km (6.2 mi) south of Sevastopol	4./JG 52
77	11 April 1944	12:47	Yak-7	PQ 46144 vicinity of Nowo Ivanovka	4./JG 52	119♠	7 May 1944	11:34	Il-2	vicinity of Balaklava; Black Sea, 10 km (6.2 mi) south of Sevastopol	4./JG 52
78	13 April 1944	08:13	Il-2	PQ 35277; 20 km (12 mi) north of Sevastopol	4./JG 52	120♠	7 May 1944	13:35? (Note: According to Mathews and Foreman claimed at 15:35.)	Il-2	PQ 35612; Black Sea, 10 km (6.2 mi) south of Sevastopol	4./JG 52
79	13 April 1944	08:21	Il-2	PQ 35423; 20 km (12 mi) northeast of Sevastopol	4./JG 52	121♠	7 May 1944	15:04	Yak-7	PQ 35612; Black Sea, 10 km (6.2 mi) south of Sevastopol	4./JG 52
80	14 April 1944	07:50	Yak-7	PQ 46774 vicinity of Sarabus	4./JG 52	122	8 May 1944	10:06	Il-2	vicinity of Balaklava; Black Sea, 10 km (6.2 mi) south of Sevastopol	4./JG 52
81	14 April 1944	07:53	Yak-7	PQ 46774 vicinity of Sarabus	4./JG 52	123	8 May 1944	17:33? (Note: According to Mathews and Foreman claimed at 17:32.)	Yak-7	PQ 35363; Black Sea, 10 km (6.2 mi) west of Sevastopol	4./JG 52
82	14 April 1944	16:28	Yak-7	PQ 36864; 20 km (12 mi) northwest of Sarabus	4./JG 52	124	8 May 1944	17:35	Yak-7	PQ 35362; Black Sea, 10 km (6.2 mi) west of Sevastopol	4./JG 52
83	15 April 1944	17:38	Yak-7	PQ 35361; Black Sea, 10 km (6.2 mi) west of Sevastopol	4./JG 52	125	9 May 1944	08:05	Il-2	vicinity of Balaklava; Black Sea, 10 km (6.2 mi) south of Sevastopol	4./JG 52
84	16 April 1944	15:35	Yak-7	PQ 35422; 20 km (12 mi) northeast of Sevastopol	4./JG 52	126	9 May 1944	16:05	Yak-7	vicinity of Balaklava; Black Sea, 10 km (6.2 mi) west of Sevastopol	4./JG 52
– Claims with Ergänzungs-Jagdgeschwader 1 –
According to Mathews and Foreman, the 127th aerial victory was not documented.
128	8 March 1945	12:06	Yak-3		4./EJG 1	129	8 March 1945	12:15	Yak-3		4./EJG 1
– Claims with III. Gruppe of Jagdgeschwader 52 –
130	10 April 1945	—	P-39	PQ 71111	11./JG 52						

=== Awards ===
- Iron Cross (1939) 2nd and 1st Class
- German Cross in Gold on 12 December 1943 as Feldwebel in the 4./Jagdgeschwader 52
- Honor Goblet of the Luftwaffe on 28 February 1944 as Feldwebel and pilot
- Knight's Cross of the Iron Cross on 14 May 1944 as pilot and Fahnenjunker-Feldwebel in the 4./Jagdgeschwader 52 (Note: According to Scherzer as pilot in the 5./Jagdgeschwader 52.)
