= Ruciane-Nida =

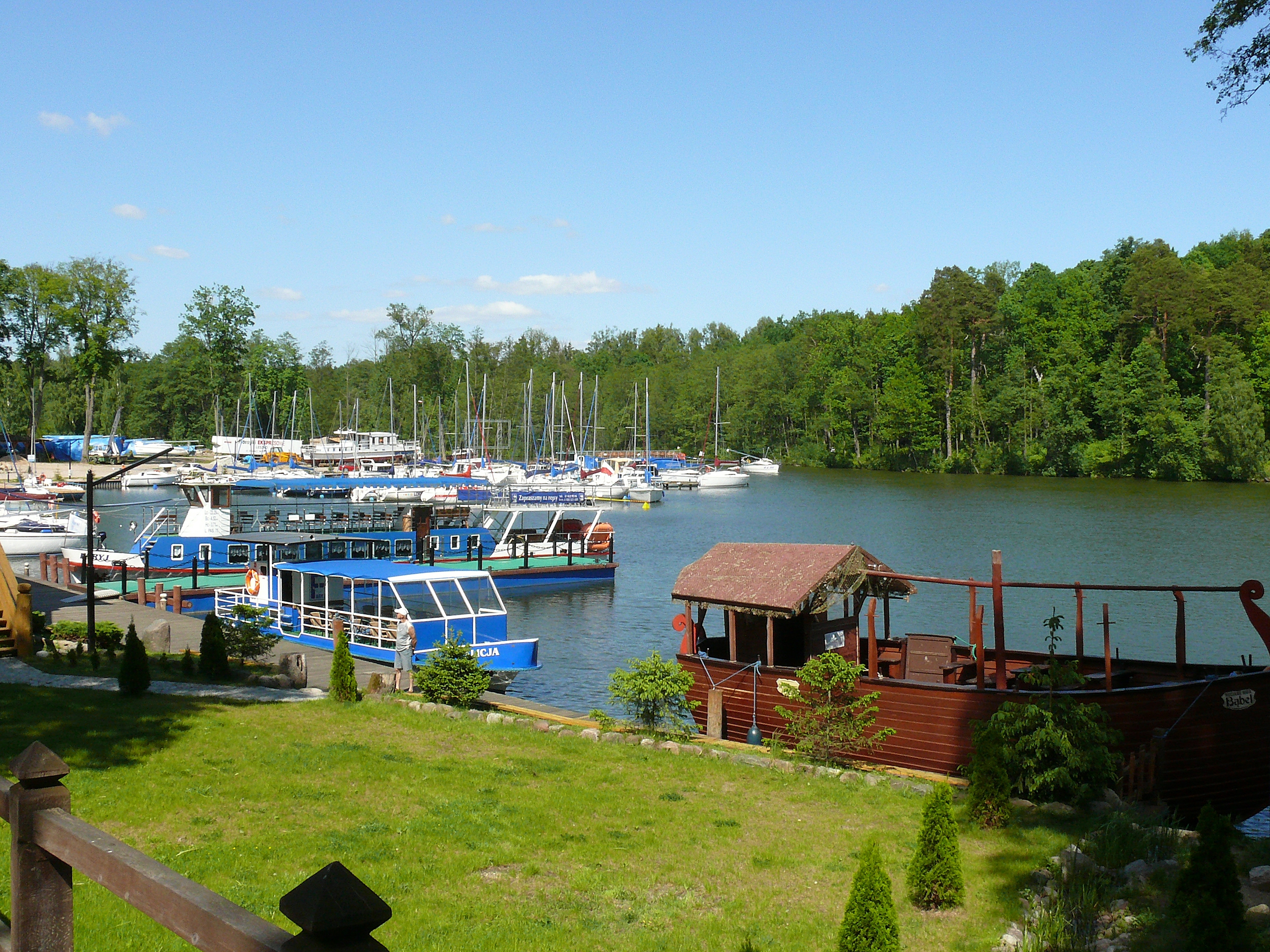
- Marina in Ruciane-Nida

- Flag Coat of arms

- Location within Poland
- Coordinates: 53°38′33″N 21°32′57″E
- Country: Poland
- Voivodeship: Warmian-Masurian
- County: Pisz
- Gmina: Ruciane-Nida
- Town rights: 1966

Area
  - Total: 17.07 km^{2} (6.59 sq mi)

Population (2006)
  - Total: 4,894
  - Density: 286.7/km^{2} (742.6/sq mi)
- Time zone: UTC+1 (CET)
  - Summer (DST): UTC+2 (CEST)
- Postal code: 12-220 - 12-221
- Website: http://www.ruciane-nida.pl

Ruciane-Nida [ruˈt͡ɕanɛ ˈɲida] is a town in Pisz County, Warmian-Masurian Voivodeship, Poland. The town was formed in 1966 by the merger of three smaller settlements: Ruciane (German: Rudczanny, renamed Niedersee in 1938), Nida (German: Nieden) and Wola Ratajowa. It is located within the ethnographic region of Masuria.

The town of Ruciane-Nida is a well-known tourist centre within the Masurian Lake District, with a popular railway line running through it: a D29-219 line – Olsztyn – Szczytno – Świętajno – Pisz – Ełk. In the summer, it becomes the furthermost Southern station of the Masurian Recreational Navigation system.

As of 2004, the town had a population of 4,934.

== Sights ==
- Guzianka Lock, Nida Canal
- Our Lady of Mercy Gate of Dawn church (Kościół Matki Bożej Miłosierdzia Ostrobramskiej) from 1910 (in Ruciane)
- Historical seed extraction plant from late 19th century
- Military bunkers from before the World Wars, early 20th century
- Nature monuments: pine, oak
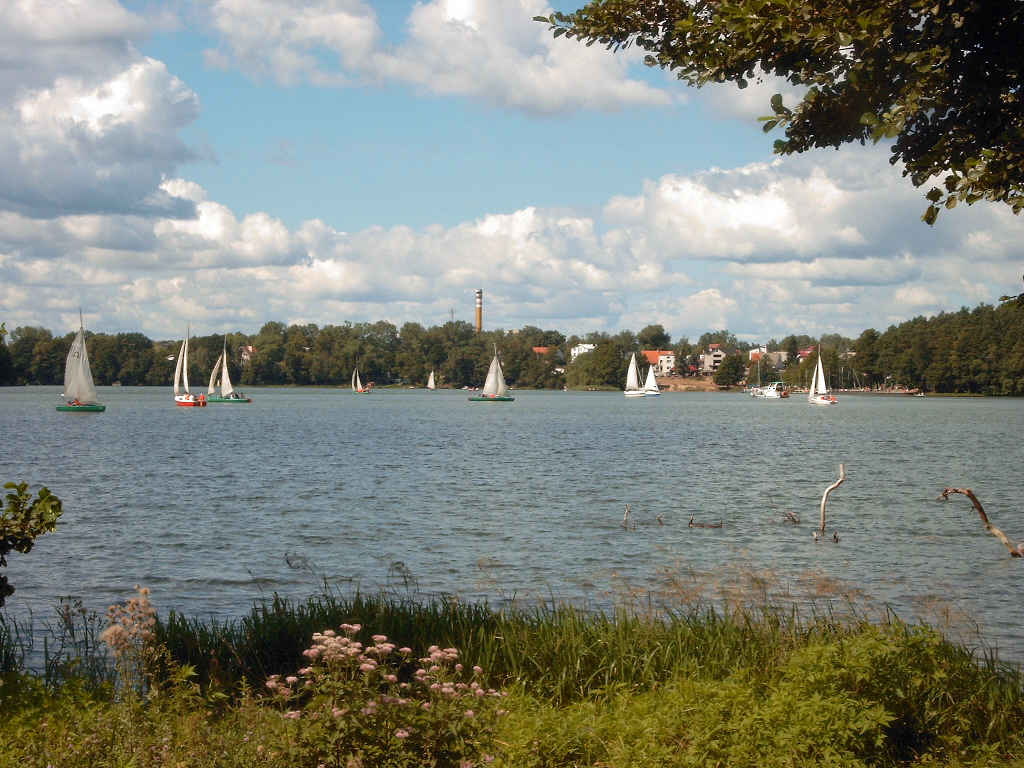
Nidzkie Lake with the Nida panorama in the background

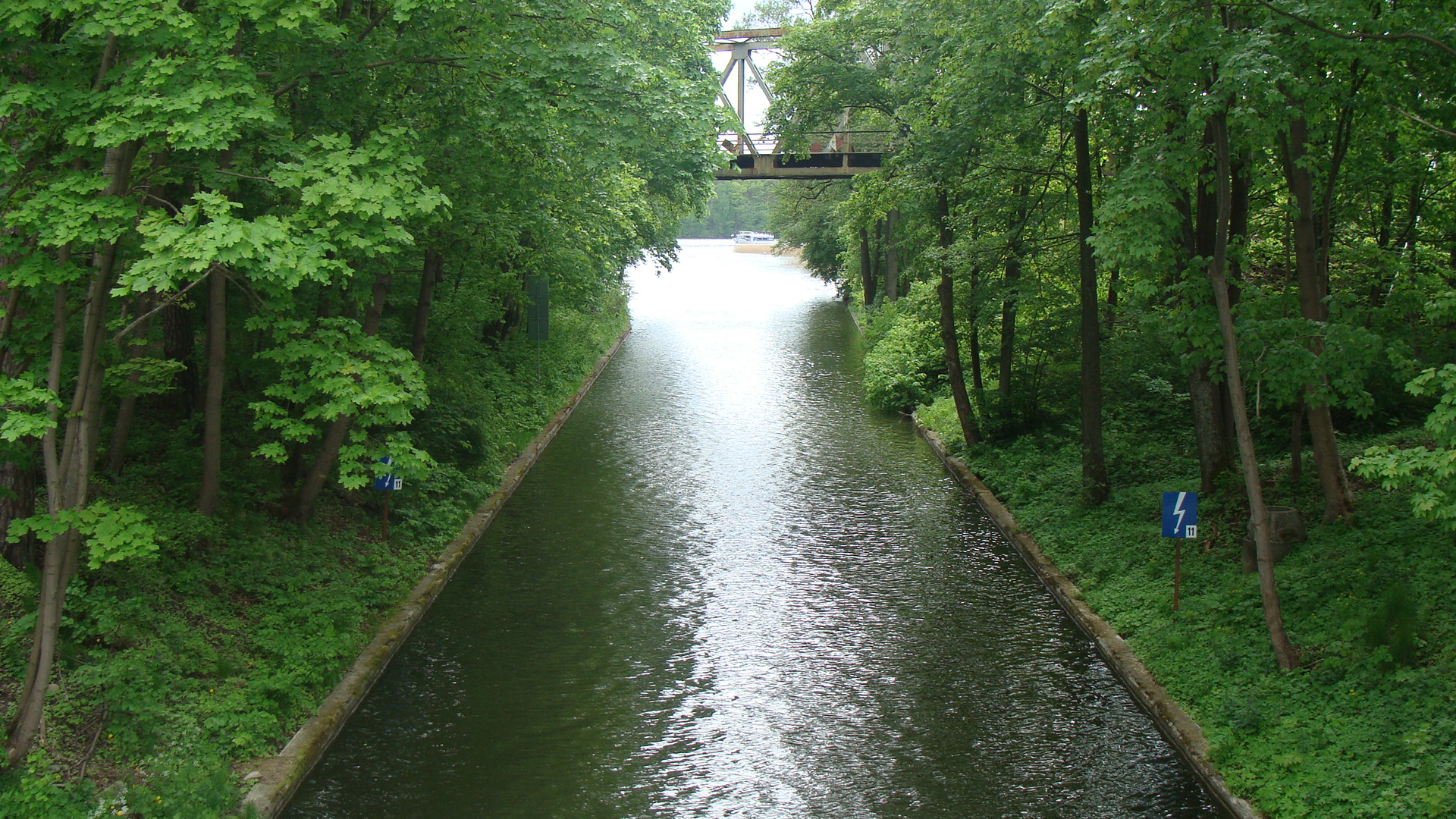
Nida Canal

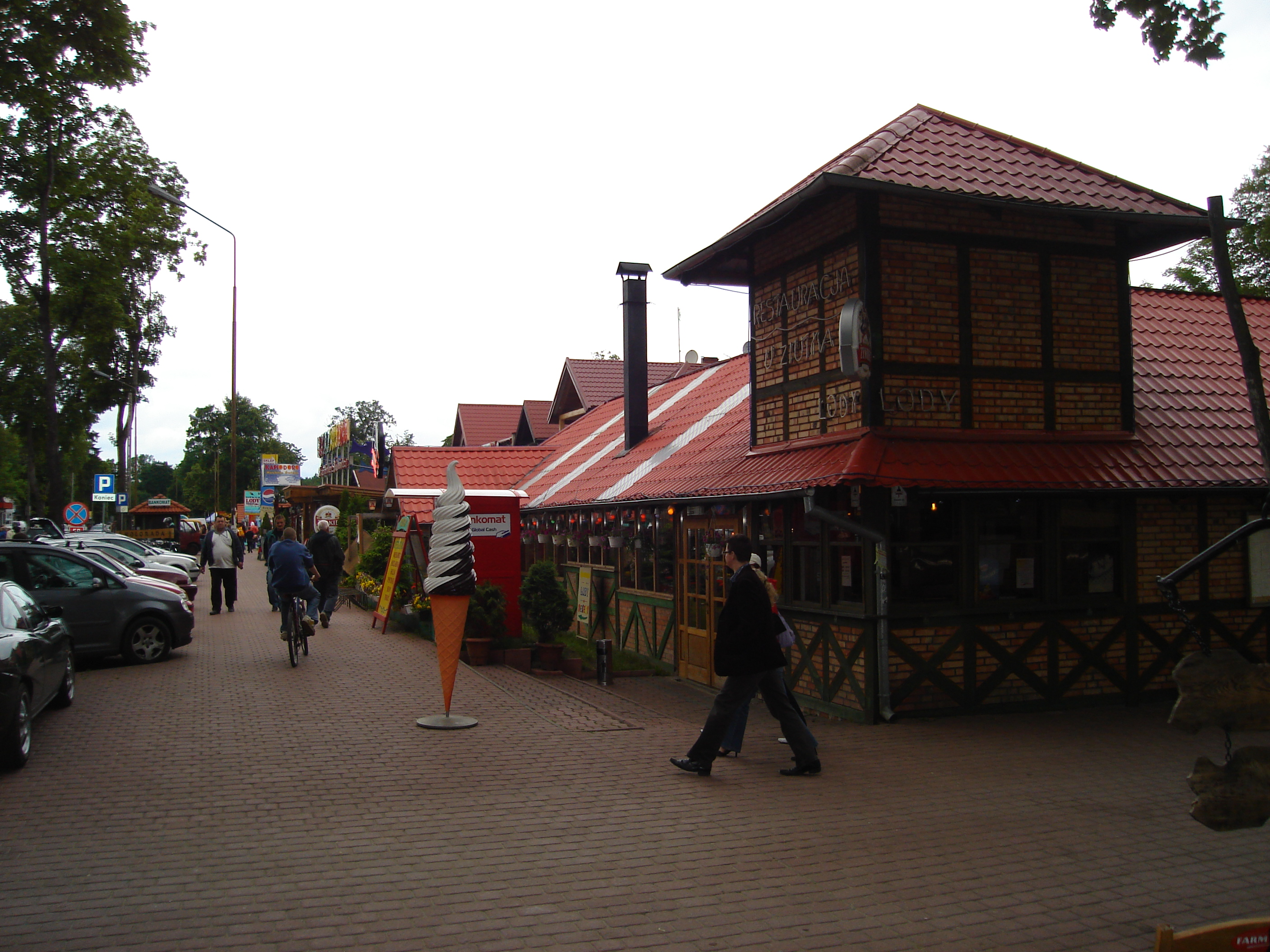
Dworcowa Street

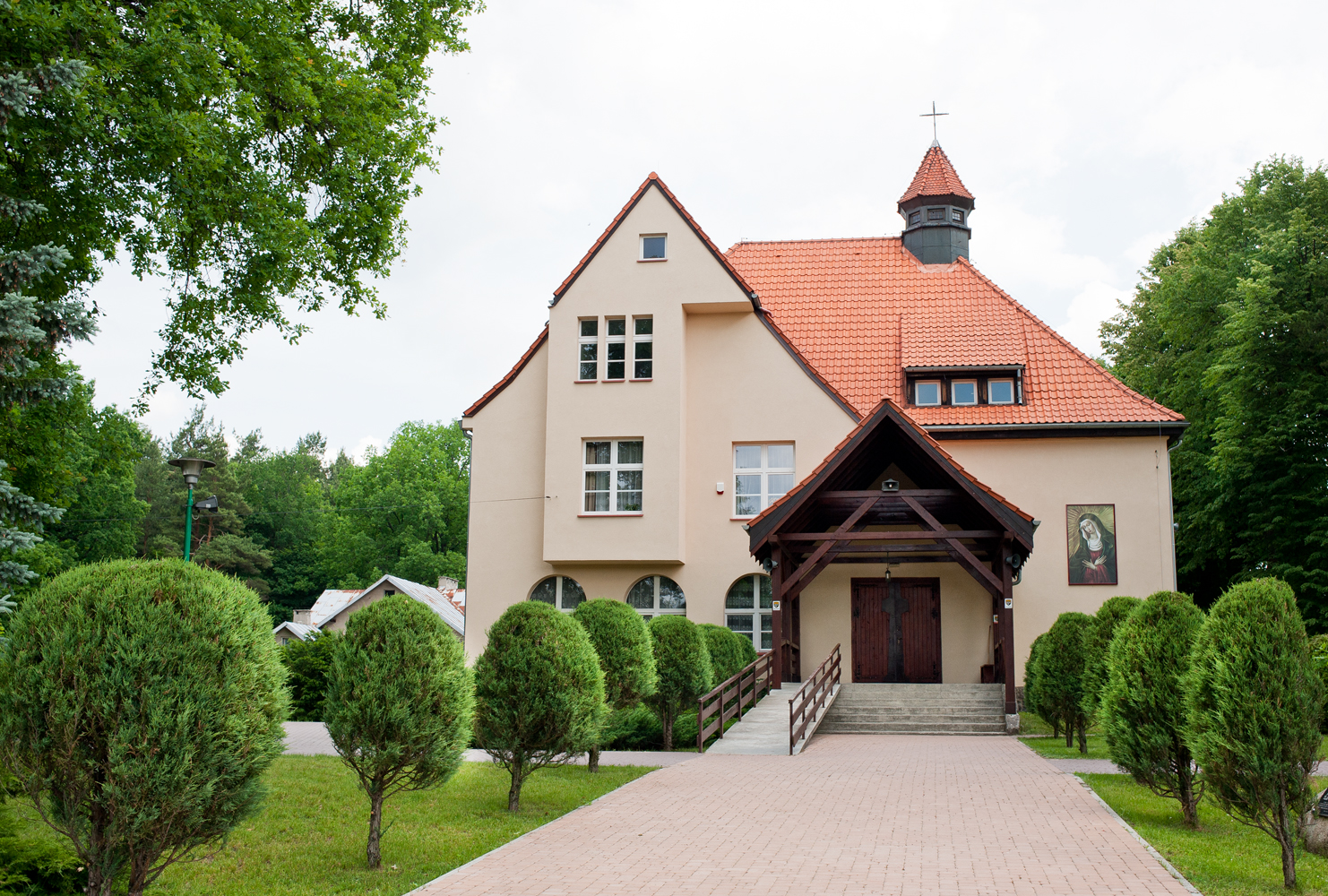
Our Lady of Mercy church

== See also ==
- Puszcza Piska
- Masuria
