= Pisz =

Town in Warmian-Masurian Voivodeship, Poland

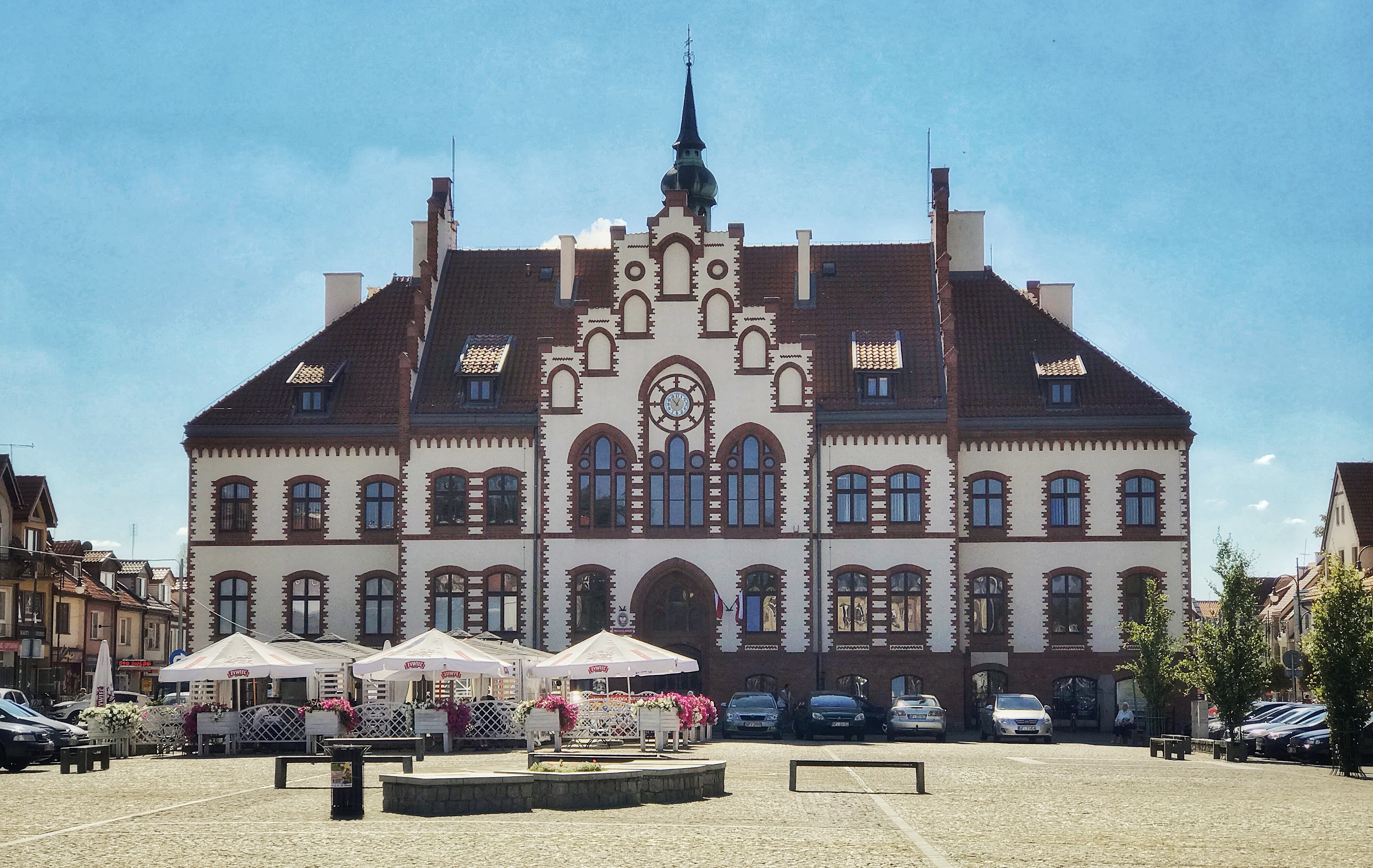
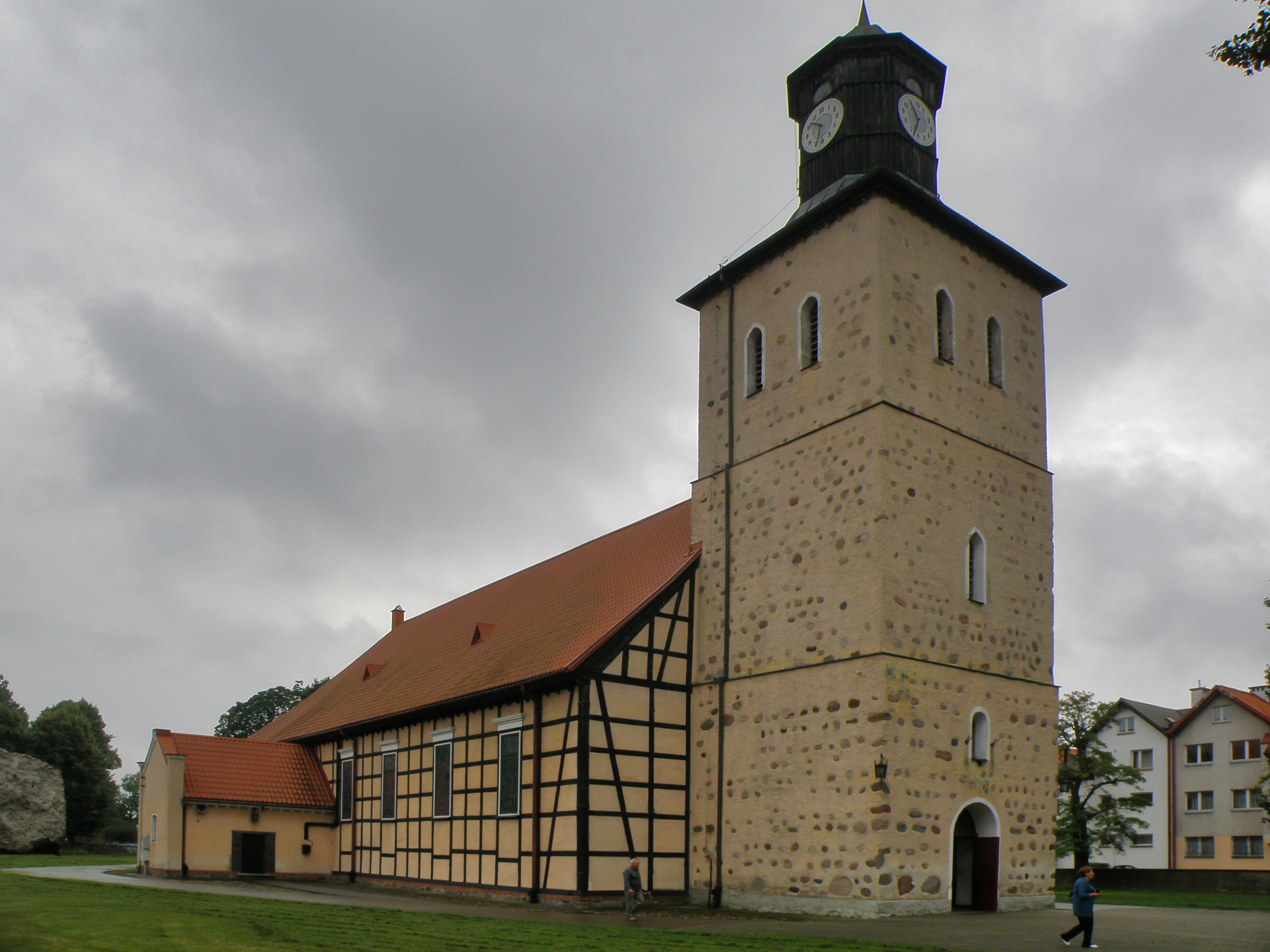
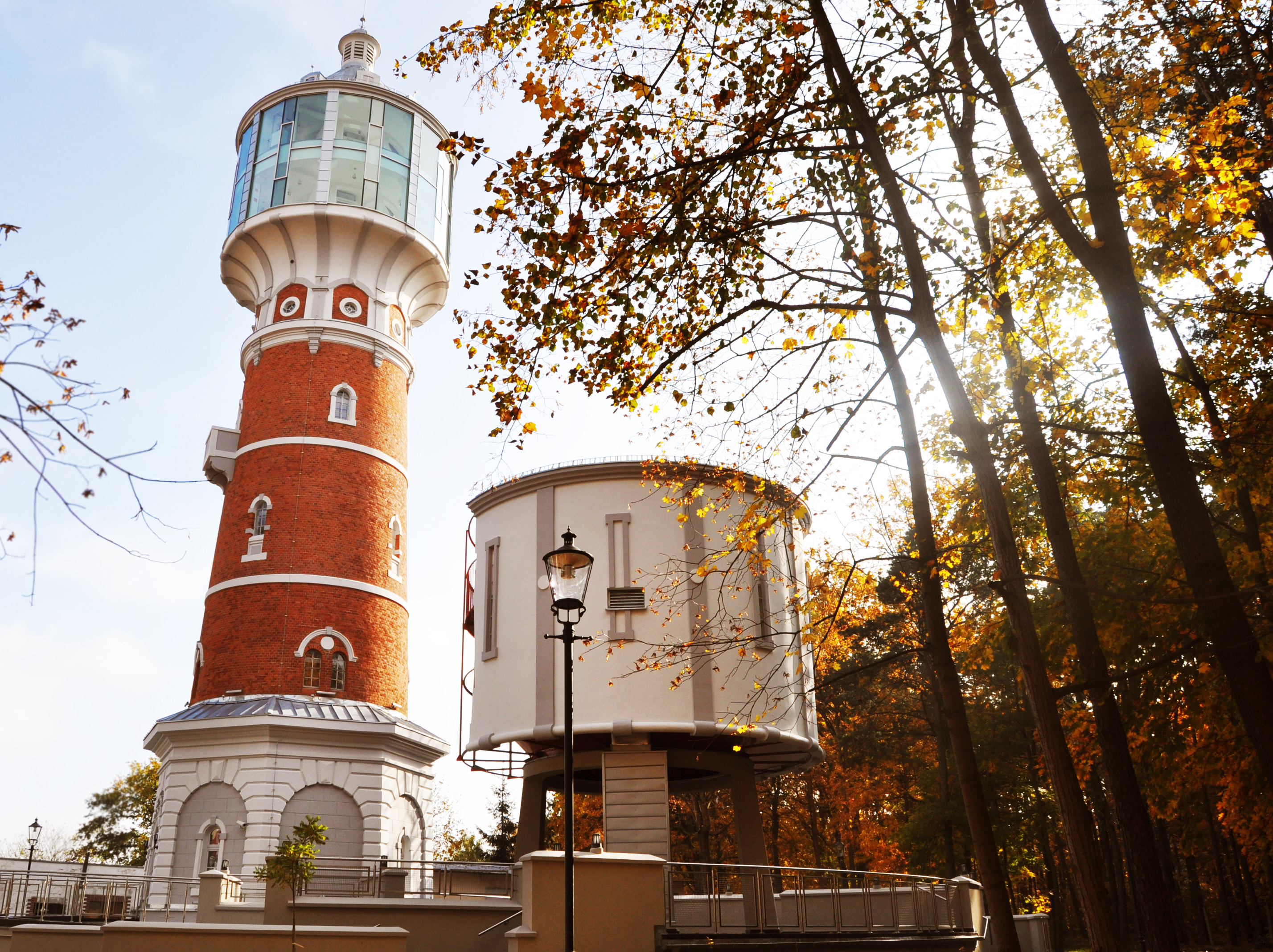
- Town Hall Saint John the Baptist church Water tower

- Coat of arms

- Location within Poland
- Coordinates: 53°37′N 21°48′E
- Country: Poland
- Voivodeship: Warmian-Masurian
- County: Pisz
- Gmina: Pisz
- Established: 14th century
- Town rights: 1451-1455, 1645

Government
  - Mayor: Dariusz Kiński

Area
  - Total: 10.08 km^{2} (3.89 sq mi)

Population (2016)
  - Total: 19,466
  - Density: 1,931/km^{2} (5,002/sq mi)
- Time zone: UTC+1 (CET)
  - Summer (DST): UTC+2 (CEST)
- Postal code: 12-200
- Area code: +48 87
- Car plates: NPI
- Website: http://www.pisz.pl/

Pisz (pronounced Peesh [pʲiʂ], previously also Jańsbork, German: Johannisburg) is a historic town in the Warmian-Masurian Voivodeship in northern Poland, with a population of 19,466 (2016). It is the seat of Pisz County. Pisz is situated at the junction of Lake Roś and the Pisa River, in the region of Masuria.

== Etymology ==
The name Pisz originates from the word pisa, meaning "swamp" in the ancient Prussian language, owing to the muddy water from nearby Lake Roś. Johannisburg received town rights in 1645 by decree of Frederick William, Elector of Brandenburg. Historic Polish names were Jańsbork and Pisz, and the former was replaced by the latter as official in 1946.

== History ==
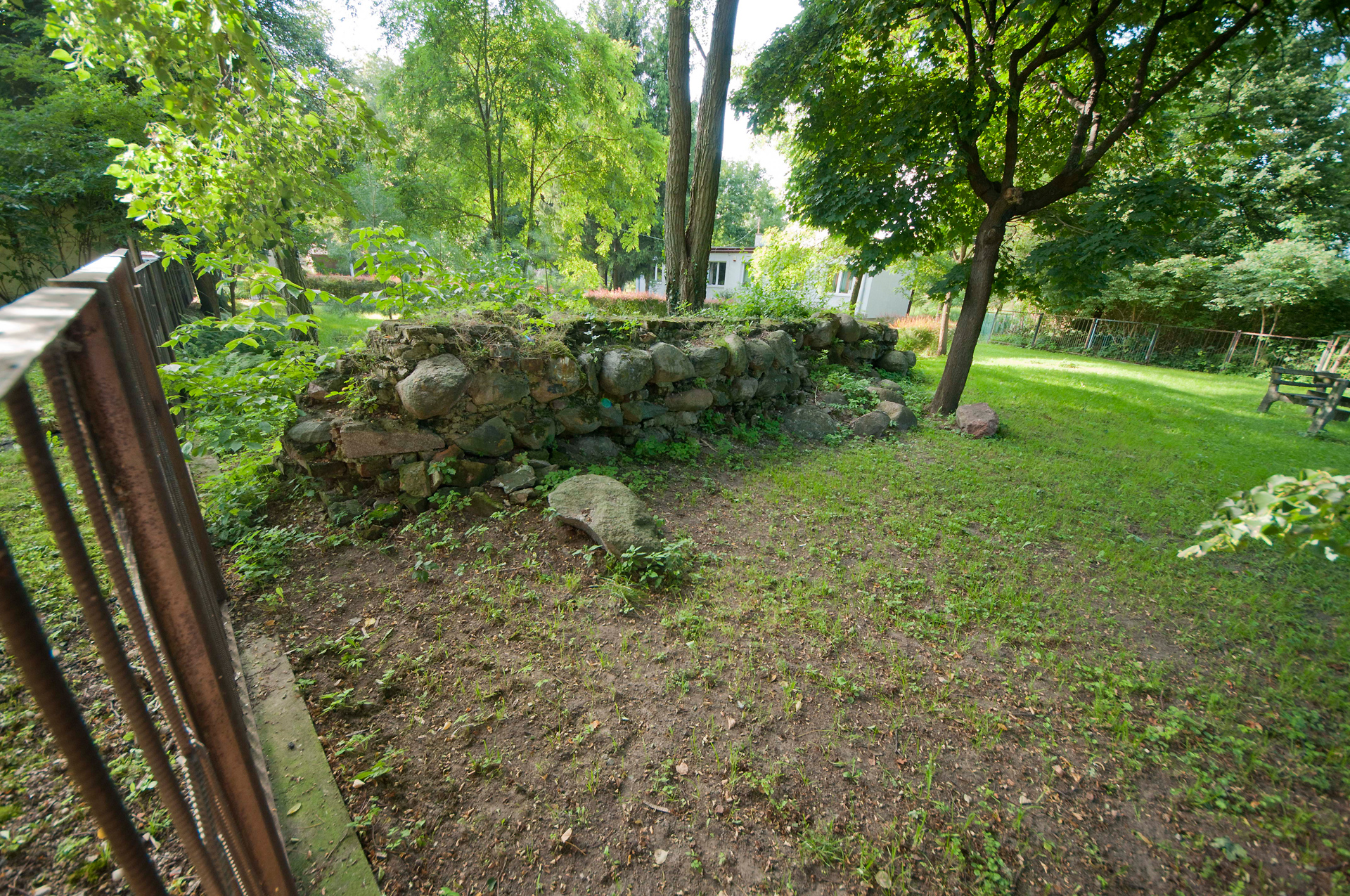
Remains of the castle

The site of today's Pisz was originally inhabited by the indigenous ethnic group of Old Prussians. In 1345 the Teutonic Order began constructing a castle nearby at the southernmost point of the Piska Forest, in the Masurian Lake District. The castle was named Johannisburg, after St. John the Baptist. The settlement nearby held a market as early as 1367, but it was not until 1645 that it received its town charter. The town's first mayor was Fryderyk Adam Czerniewski. The population of the settlement and its environs was almost entirely Polish since its establishment. The official German name of the town was Johannisburg, while the Polish-speaking residents referred to it as Jańsbork. In 1454 it was incorporated to Poland by King Casimir IV Jagiellon and after 1466 it was a part of Poland as a fief. Its early growth owed much to the residents' skill in beekeeping, and it was located on trade routes leading to Gdańsk and to the Vistula and Narew Rivers.

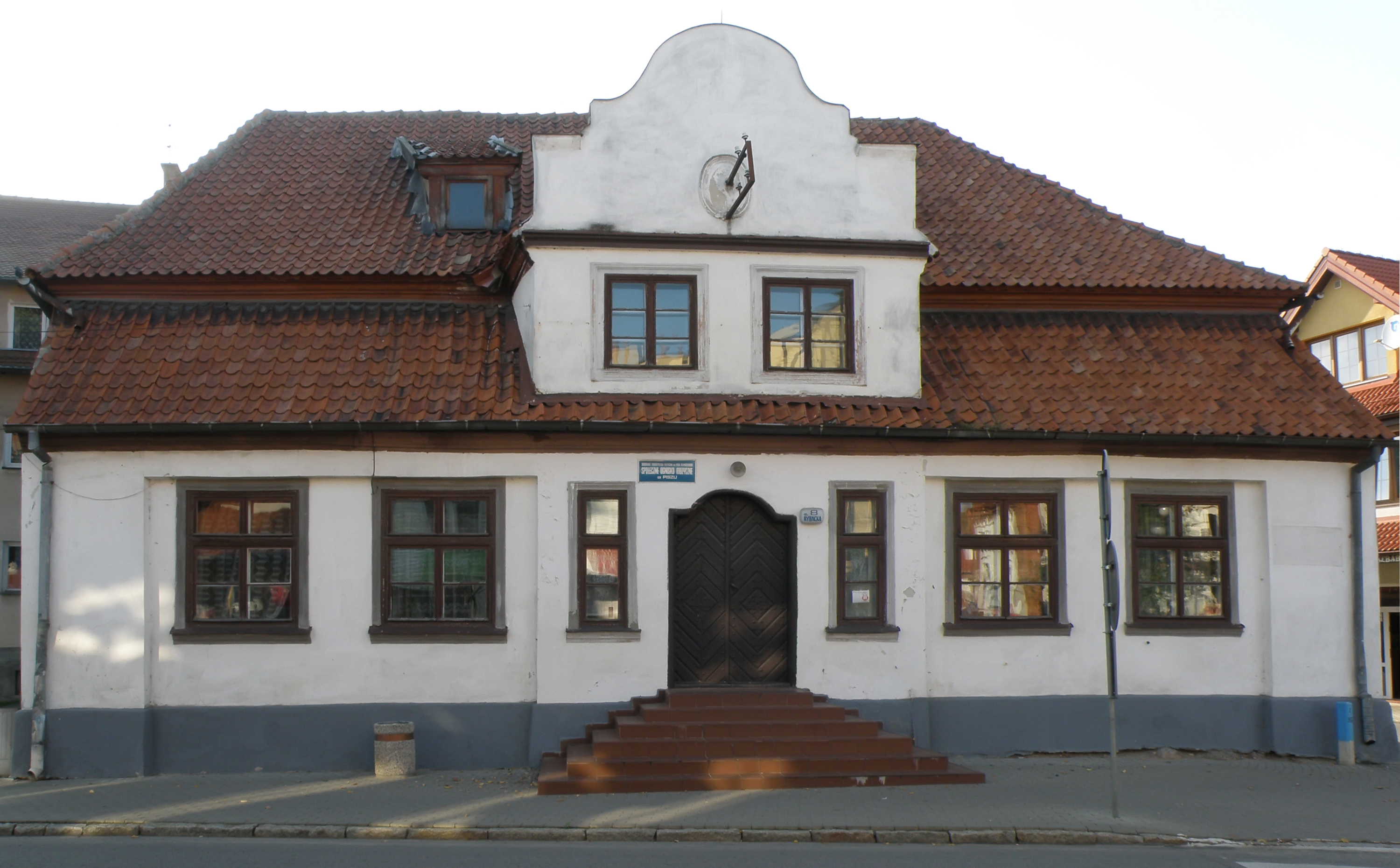
Royal House (Dom Królewski)

The town became part of Ducal Prussia in 1525 and remained under Polish suzerainty until 1657. In 1639 Polish King Władysław IV Vasa visited the town. Later on, the town was part of Brandenburg-Prussia, and, after that it became part of the Kingdom of Prussia in 1701 and Germany in 1871. In 1698, King of Poland Augustus II the Strong and Elector of Brandenburg Frederick I held a meeting in the local castle. Polish King Stanisław Leszczyński stopped in the town in 1709 and 1734 and in 1813 Tsar Alexander I of Russia stayed here.

In 1709/10 only 14 inhabitants survived the plague. The town began to develop extensively in the 19th century. In 1818 it became the seat of the Landkreis Johannisburg in the province of East Prussia. During the January Uprising, weapons were smuggled through the town and area to the Russian Partition of Poland, and Polish insurgents fleeing the Russian Partition took refuge in the town. The Prussians imprisoned and tried Polish insurgents and resistance members in the town. Residents protested against the deportation of insurgents to the Russian Partition. The town's population in 1876 was approximately 3,000. A railway built connecting Allenstein (Olsztyn) and Lyck (Ełk) ran through Johannisburg. Its water supply system and gas works were built in 1907 and its municipal slaughterhouse in 1913. The town's industrial development focused on wood processing and metallurgy. According to the 1900 Imperial German census, Johannisburg's population consisted of 70.2% Poles.

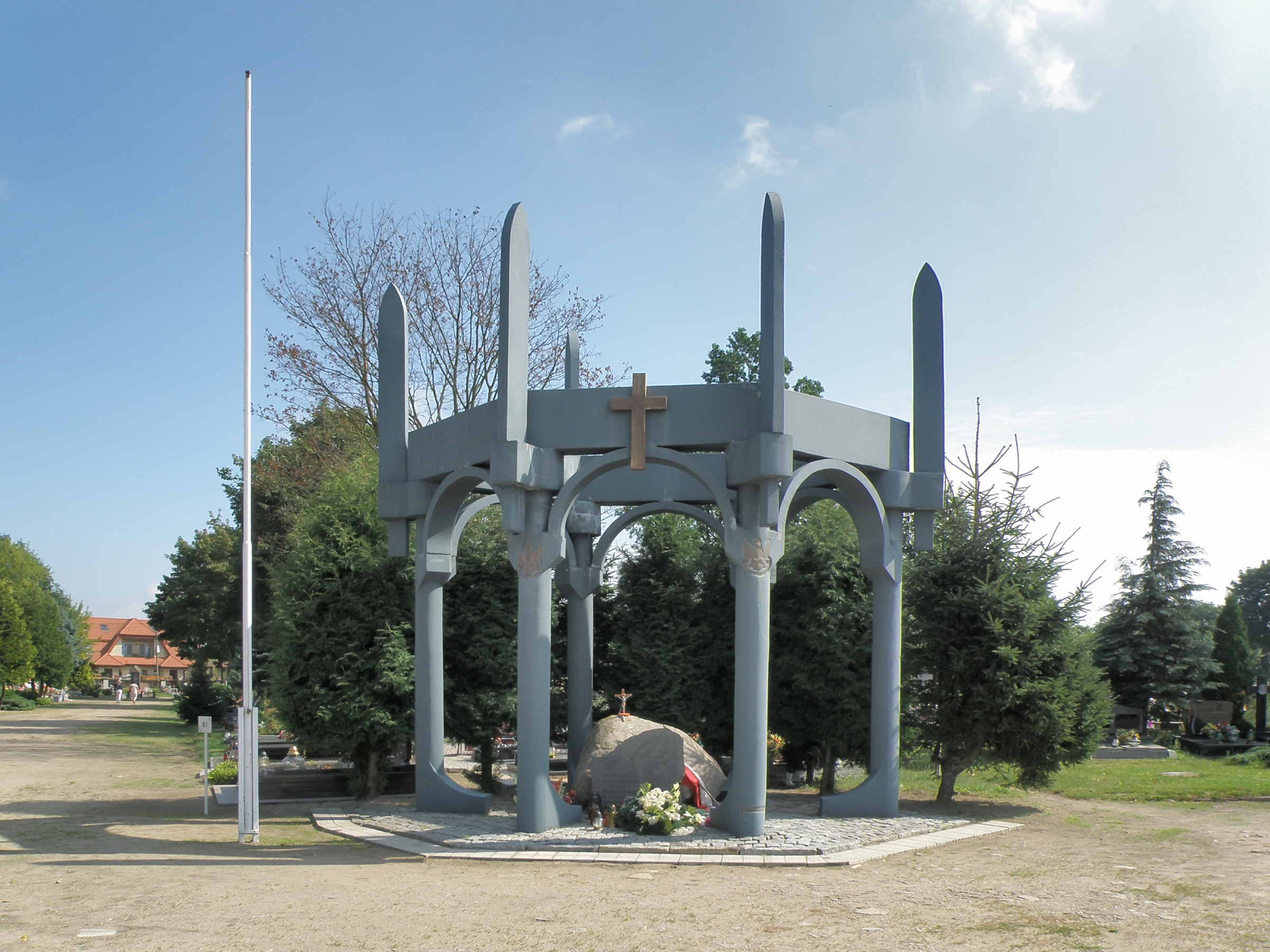
A grave of Polish soldiers who died during the 1939 Defensive War (Municipal Cemetery in Pisz)

As a result of the treaty of Versailles, the 1920 East Prussian plebiscite was organized under the control of the League of Nations. It was preceded by a campaign of violence and terror by the Germans against the Poles. The Germans attacked the Polish community center, there were beatings of Poles and the Polish press reported preparations being made for a pogrom against Poles, thus it resulted in 2,940 votes to remain in East Prussia, and therefore Germany, and none for Poland.

During World War II, Johannisburg was 70% destroyed by fighting and occupation by the Soviet Red Army. At war's end in 1945, it was transferred from Soviet to Polish control according to the Potsdam Agreement and officially renamed Pisz in 1946. The name Pisz comes from the Old Prussian word pisa ("swamp"), owing to the muddy water from nearby Lake Roś. After assumption of Polish rule, Germans returned to their home after flight from the Red Army. Those who did not pledge allegiance to Poland were expelled in accordance with the Potsdam Agreement.

== Tourism and sights ==
The town is a popular place to begin sailing on the Masurian lakes. Historic sites of Pisz include the Gothic town hall, the Church of St. John, the ruins of the Teutonic Knights' castle and preserved World War II bunkers.

== Transport ==
National roads 58 and 63 intersect in Pisz.

Pisz has a railway station on the Olsztyn-Ełk railway line.

== Economy ==
Due to natural resources comprising the reach forestry and shallow deposits of bog iron ore, the industrial traditions of Pisz are connected with wood processing (the sawmill) and metallurgy. There are iron works in Wądołek, as well as the industrial smithies in Wiartl and in Jaśkowo. The wood processing industry has a long tradition in Pisz. The core of the industry is its sawmill, supporting a broadbase plywood industry with a plant called Zakłady Przemysłu Sklejek.

Pisz is a centre of tourism industry, with boat trips, canoeing and kayaking along the Krutynia River, as well as with popular yachting voyages on the Masurian Lakes known in Polish as Kraina Wielkich Jezior. On the shore of Nidzkie Lake there's the K. I. Gałczyński Museum in Leśniczówka Pranie. There is a museum in the 9th century granary displaying historical artifacts and a notable collection of antlers. There are horse and horse-drawn carriage trips. The town is surrounded by the largest forest complex of the Masuria region, known as Puszcza Piska (Piska Primeval Forest) with eleven nature reserves.

== Notable people ==
- Ludwig Yorck von Wartenburg (1759–1830), town commander
- Gustaw Gizewiusz (1810–1848), activist
- Samuel Lublinski (1868–1910), writer, literary historian, critic and philosopher of religion
- Günther Strupp (1912–1996), artist
- Marianne Hold (1929–1994), actress
- Zbigniew Włodkowski (born 1961), politician
- Marcin Kaczmarek (born 1977), Olympic butterfly swimmer
