= Masurian Landscape Park =

Protected area in Masuria, Poland

- Mazurski Park Krajobrazowy
- IUCN category V (protected landscape/seascape)
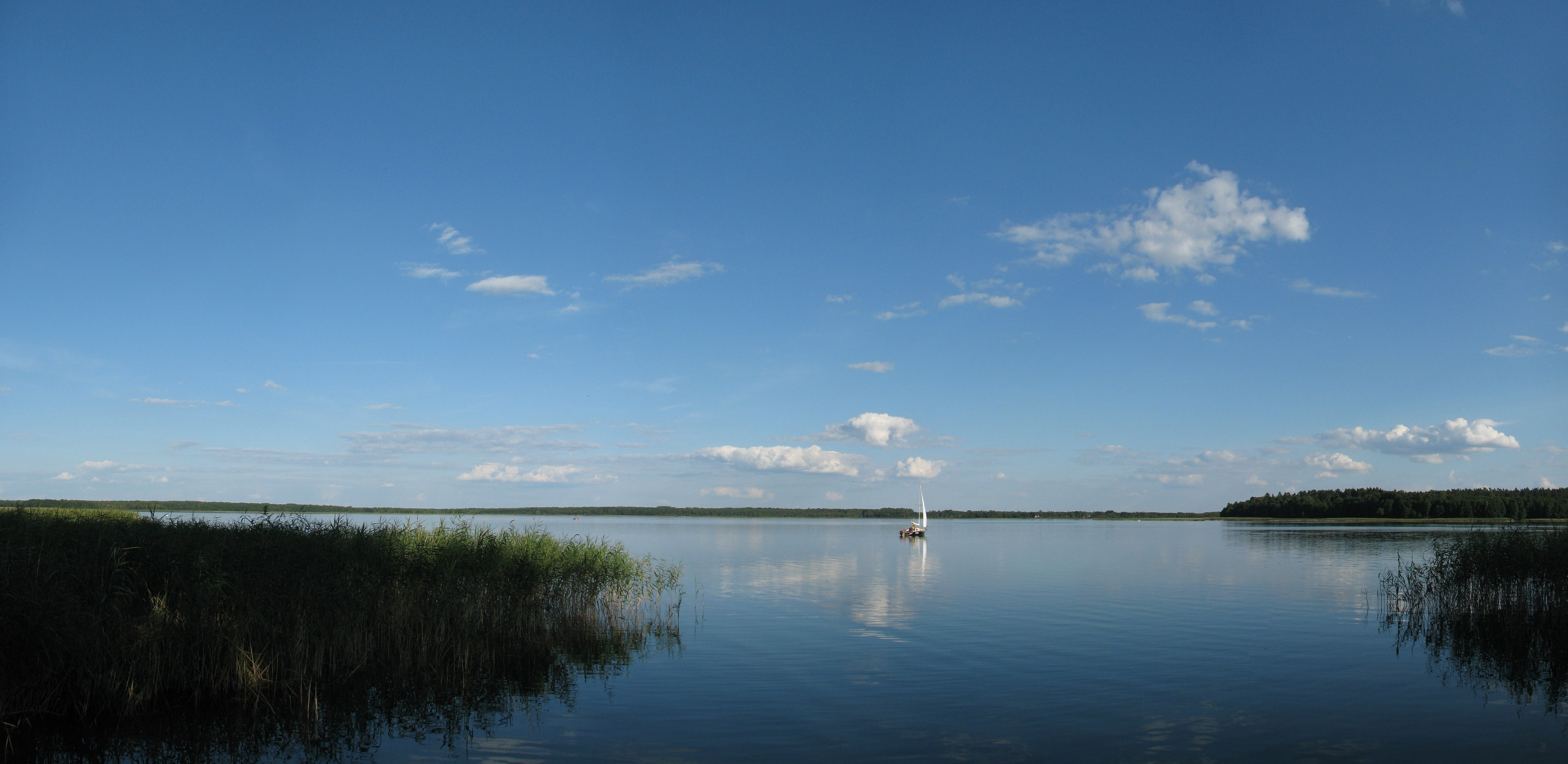
- Seksty Lake from Kaczor peninsula in Masurian Landscape Park

- Location within Poland
- Location: Masurian Lake District, Warmian-Masurian Voivodeship, Poland
- Nearest city: Mikołajki
- Coordinates: 53°43′23″N 21°36′11″E
- Area: 536.55 km^{2} (207.16 sq mi)
- Established: 1977
- Governing body: Wojewoda Warmińsko-Mazurski

Masurian Landscape Park (Polish: Mazurski Park Krajobrazowy) is a designated Polish Landscape Park protected area within Warmian-Masurian Voivodeship, in northern Poland. It is one of the largest landscape parks in Poland.

It was established in 1977, and is a Natura 2000 EU Special Protection Area.

== Geography ==
The Landscape Park protects an area of 536.55 square kilometres (207.16 sq mi) in the Masurian Lake District.

The Park lies within Warmian-Masurian Voivodeship, in:

- Mrągowo County — Gmina Mikołajki, Gmina Mrągowo, and Gmina Piecki
- Pisz County — Gmina Pisz, Gmina Orzysz, and Gmina Ruciane-Nida
- Szczytno County — Gmina Świętajno

=== Features ===
The Park contains the biggest Polish lake called Śniardwy, with an area of 114.16 km^{2}, together with lakes of Kaczerajno and Seksty. Other bigger lakes include Bełdany (9.41 km^{2}), Mokre (8.15 km^{2}), Łuknajno (6.92 km^{2}), Mikołajskie (4.98 km^{2}), Warnołty (4.65 km^{2}) and Zdrużno (2.52 km^{2}). There are also over 20 smaller dystrophic lakes in the Krutynia river basin.

Within the Landscape Park are 11 nature reserves, including that of Łuknajno Lake, a Ramsar site also designated by UNESCO as a biosphere reserve due to its unique bird habitat.

== General information ==
- Total area: 536.55 km^{2}
- Forested area: 290 km^{2}
- Water area (rivers and lakes): 180 km^{2}
- Protected area: 186.08 km^{2}
- Number of settlements: 29
- Number of permanent residents: approx. 4,800

Masurian Landscape Park logo.

== See also ==
- Landscape parks in Poland
- Special Protection Areas in Poland
- Masurian dialects
- Natura 2000 in Poland
