= 48th Academy Awards =

- Date: March 29, 1976
- Site: Dorothy Chandler Pavilion, Los Angeles, California, U.S.
- Hosted by: Walter Matthau, Robert Shaw, George Segal, Goldie Hawn and Gene Kelly
- Produced by: Howard W. Koch
- Directed by: Marty Pasetta

Highlights
- Best Picture: One Flew Over the Cuckoo's Nest
- Most awards: One Flew Over the Cuckoo's Nest (5)
- Most nominations: One Flew Over the Cuckoo's Nest (9)

TV in the United States
- Network: ABC
- Duration: 3 hours, 12 minutes

The 48th Academy Awards were presented Monday, March 29, 1976, at the Dorothy Chandler Pavilion in Los Angeles, California. The ceremonies were presided over by Walter Matthau, Robert Shaw, George Segal, Goldie Hawn, and Gene Kelly.

Miloš Forman's One Flew Over the Cuckoo's Nest made a "clean sweep" of the five major categories: Best Picture, Best Actor, Best Actress, Best Director and Best Screenplay (Adapted). It was the second of three films to date to do so, following It Happened One Night in 1934 and preceding The Silence of the Lambs in 1991.

20-year-old French actress Isabelle Adjani received her first nomination for Best Actress this year, becoming the youngest nominee that category, breaking the record set by 22-year-old Elizabeth Hartman in 1965. Her record would be surpassed by 13-year-old Keisha Castle-Hughes in 2004, and again in 2013 by nine-year old Quvenzhané Wallis, the current record. Adjani also co-presented the award for Best Film Editing.

At 80, George Burns became the oldest acting winner, as well as the last person born in the nineteenth century to receive an acting award. His record stood until Jessica Tandy won Best Actress in 1989; Burns was later succeeded as the oldest Best Supporting Actor winner by Christopher Plummer, who won in 2012 for Beginners at the age of 82.

Jaws won all its nominations except Best Picture, the last film to do so until Traffic. As of the 94th Academy Awards, Amarcord, nominated for Best Director, is the last film to be nominated for Academy Awards in separate years (having won the award for Best Foreign Language Film the year before).

This ceremony marked the return of Oscar telecasts to ABC, which carried the event from 1961 until NBC held the rights for a 5-year period beginning in 1971. (ABC has maintained Oscar TV rights to this day.) NBC's coverage of the NCAA Division I basketball championship aired the same night as the ceremony, and while Adjani unsealed the envelope for Best Film Editing, co-presenter Elliott Gould jokingly announced the winner as "Indiana, 86-68" (the title game's outcome in Philadelphia).

== Winners and nominees ==
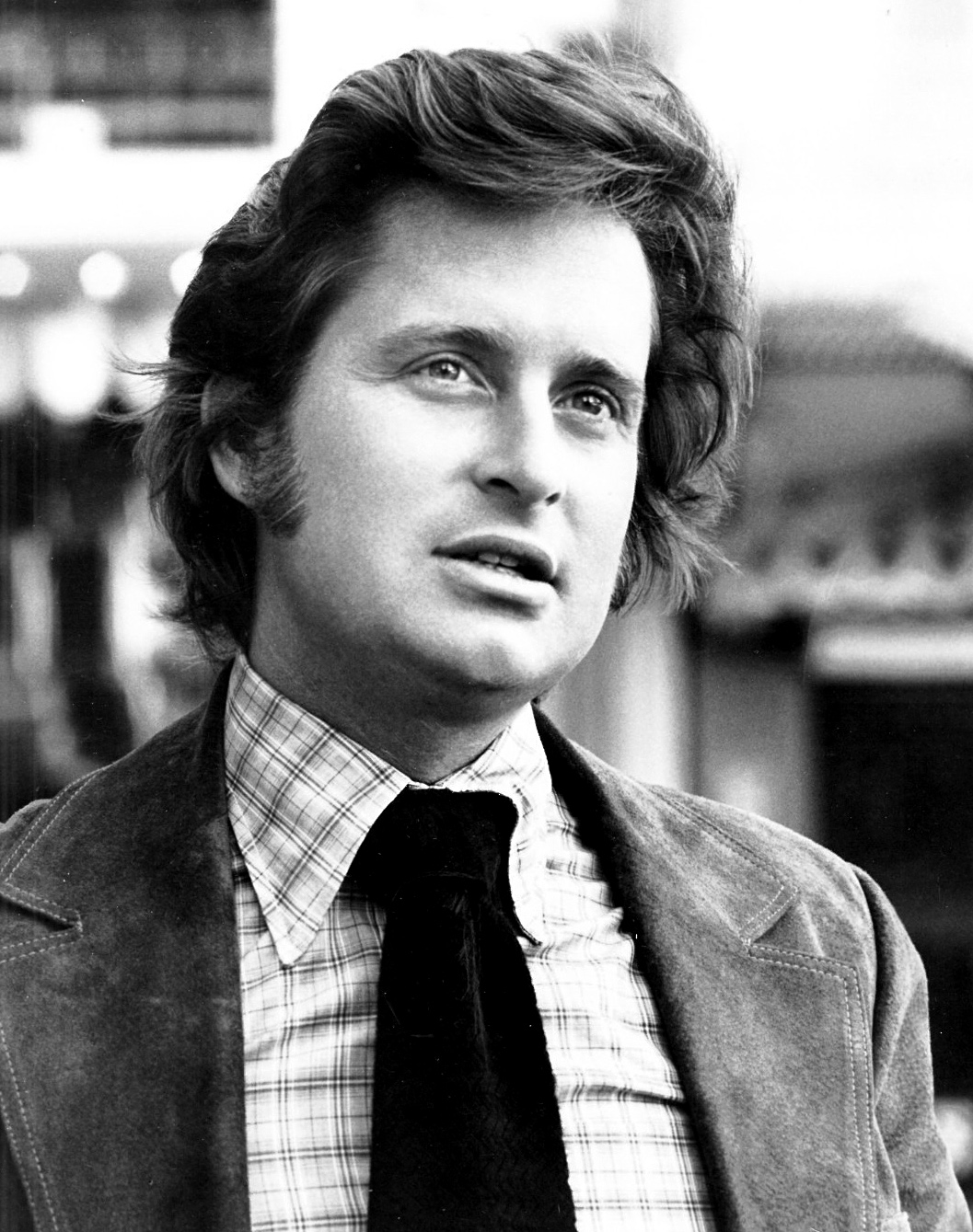
Michael Douglas, Best Picture co-winner

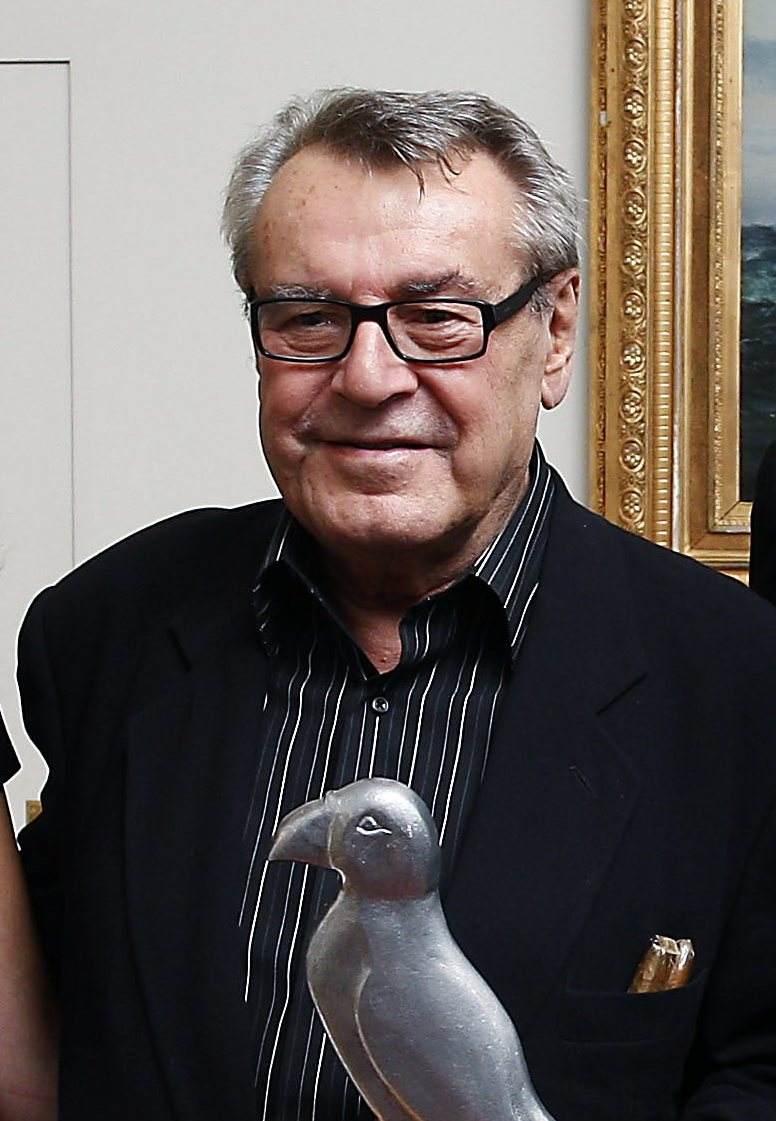
Miloš Forman, Best Director winner

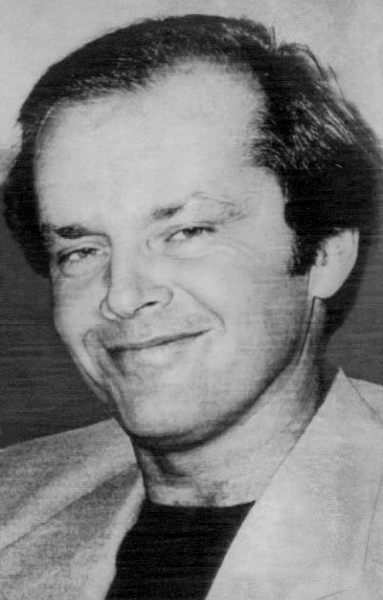
Jack Nicholson, Best Actor winner

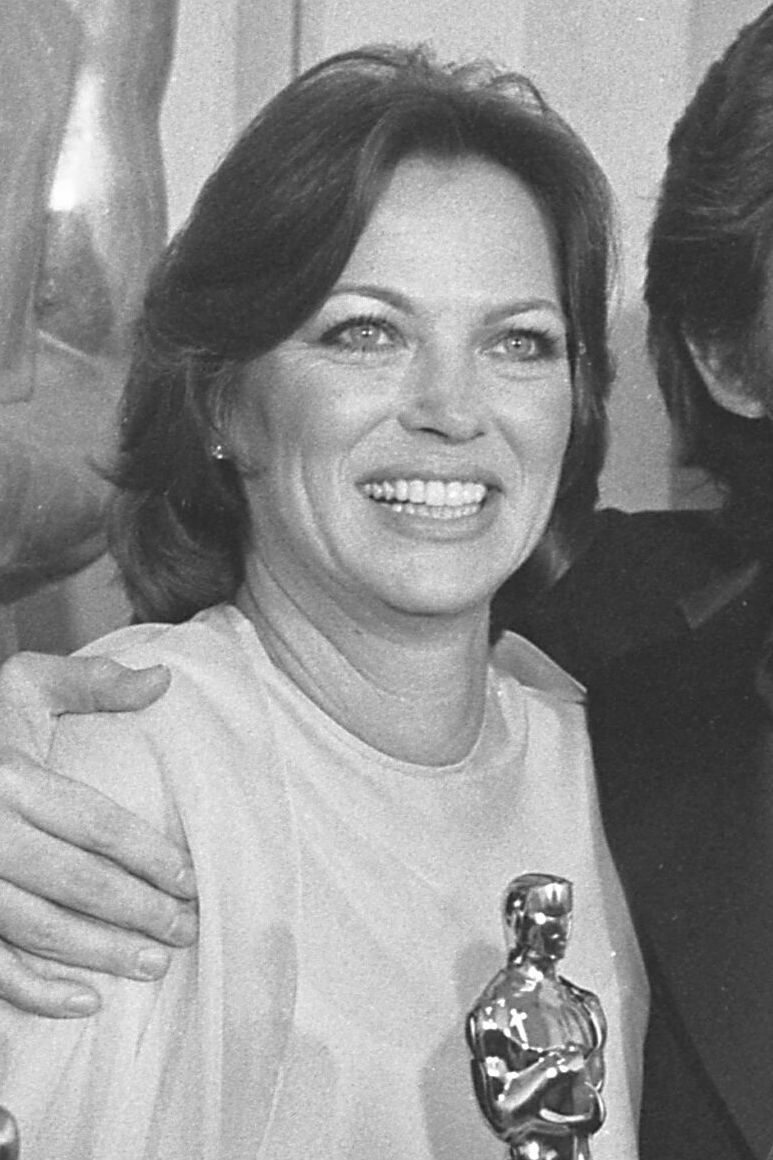
Louise Fletcher, Best Actress winner

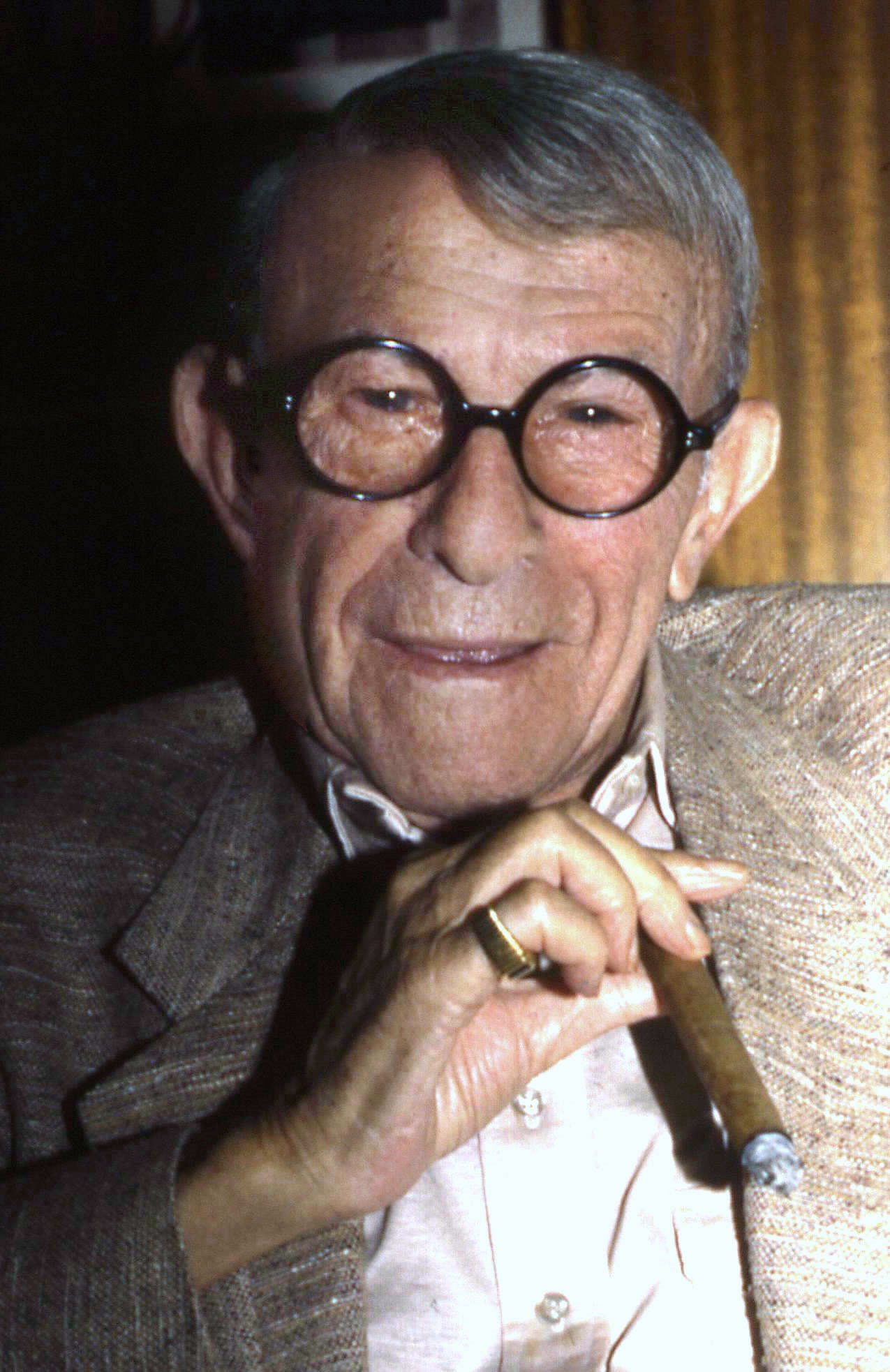
George Burns, Best Supporting Actor winner

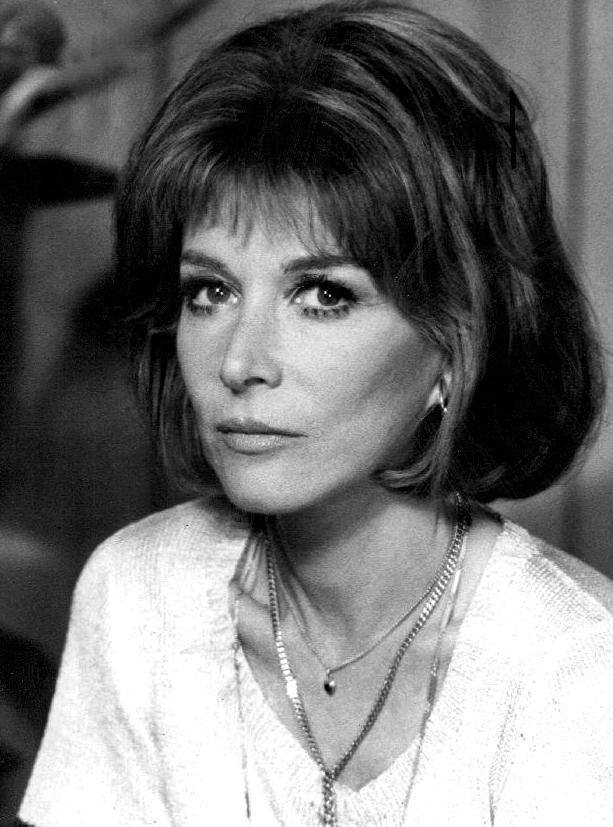
Lee Grant, Best Supporting Actress winner

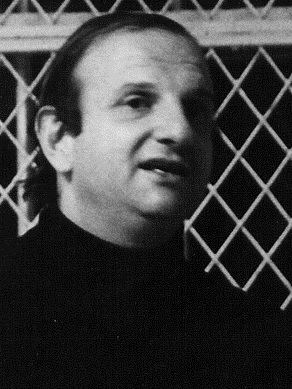
Bo Goldman, Best Adapted Screenplay co-winner

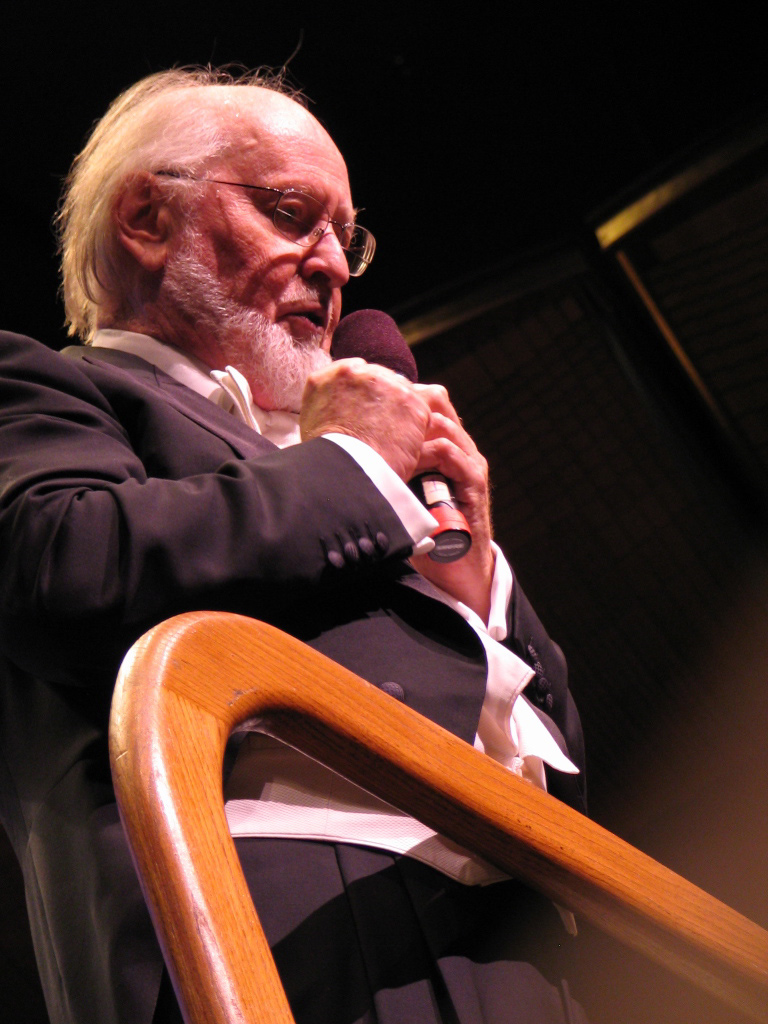
John Williams, Best Original Score winner

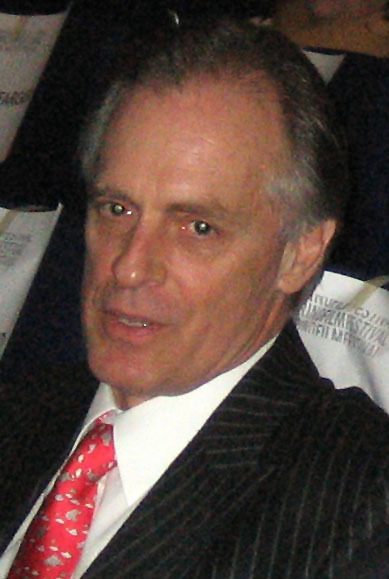
Keith Carradine, Best Original Song winner

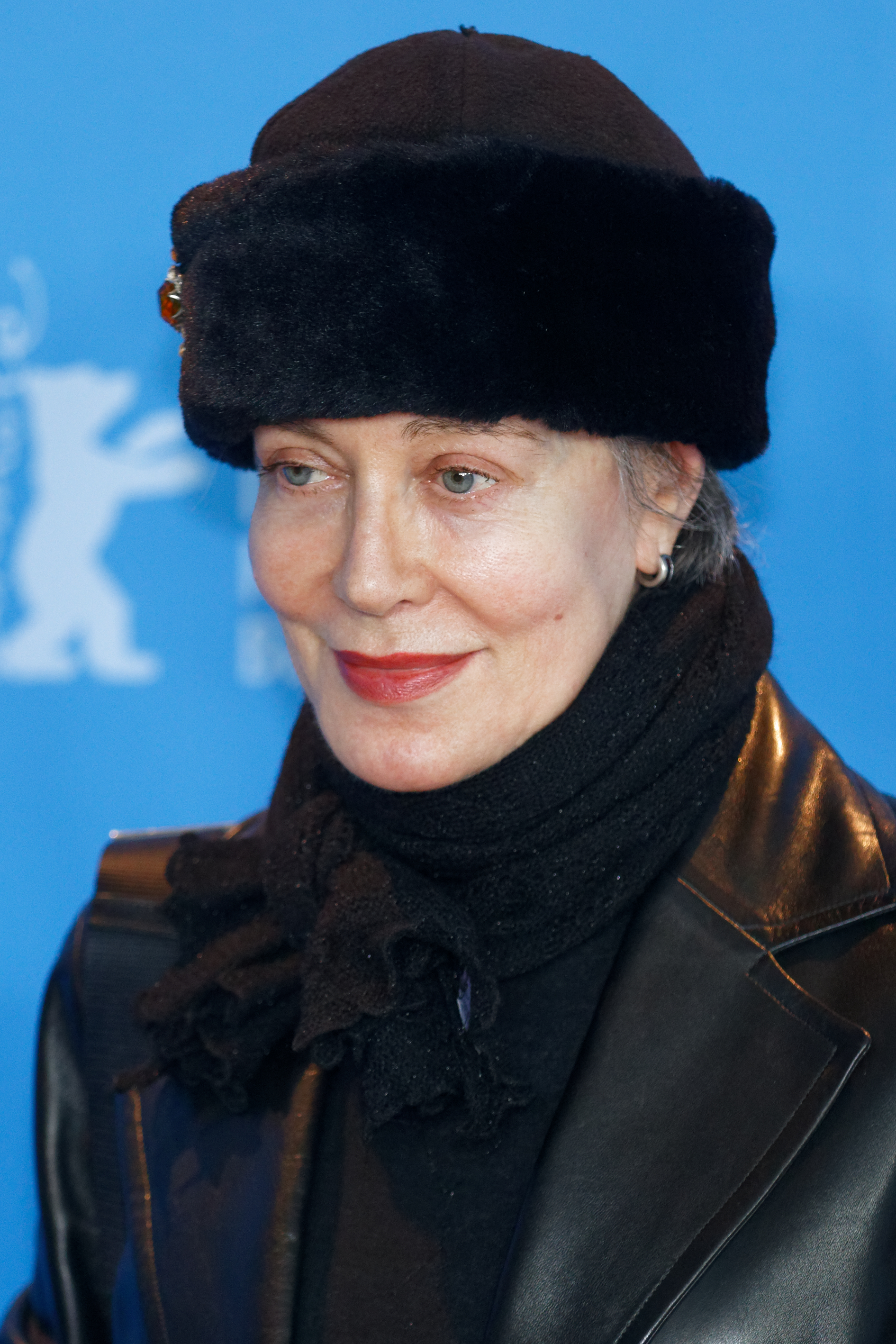
Milena Canonero, Best Costume Design co-winner

Nominees were announced on February 17, 1976. Winners are listed first and highlighted in boldface.

**Best Picture**: **One Flew Over the Cuckoo's Nest – Michael Douglas and Saul Zaentz, producers**; Barry Lyndon – Stanley Kubrick, producer; Dog Day Afternoon – Martin Bregman and Martin Elfand, producers; Jaws – Richard D. Zanuck and David Brown, producers; Nashville – Robert Altman, producer	**Best Directing**: **Miloš Forman – One Flew Over the Cuckoo's Nest**; Federico Fellini – Amarcord; Stanley Kubrick – Barry Lyndon; Sidney Lumet – Dog Day Afternoon; Robert Altman – Nashville
**Best Actor**: **Jack Nicholson – One Flew Over the Cuckoo's Nest as Randle Patrick McMurphy**; Walter Matthau – The Sunshine Boys as Willy Clark; Al Pacino – Dog Day Afternoon as Sonny Wortzik; Maximilian Schell – The Man in the Glass Booth as Arthur Goldman; James Whitmore – Give 'em Hell, Harry! as Harry S. Truman	**Best Actress**: **Louise Fletcher – One Flew Over the Cuckoo's Nest as Nurse Mildred Ratched**; Isabelle Adjani – The Story of Adele H. as Adèle Hugo / Adèle Lewry; Ann-Margret – Tommy as Nora Walker; Glenda Jackson – Hedda as Hedda Gabler; Carol Kane – Hester Street as Gitl
**Best Actor in a Supporting Role**: **George Burns – The Sunshine Boys as Al Lewis**; Brad Dourif – One Flew Over the Cuckoo's Nest as Billy Bibbit; Burgess Meredith – The Day of the Locust as Harry Greener; Chris Sarandon – Dog Day Afternoon as Leon Shermer; Jack Warden – Shampoo as Lester Karpf	**Best Actress in a Supporting Role**: **Lee Grant – Shampoo as Felicia Karpf**; Ronee Blakley – Nashville as Barbara Jean; Sylvia Miles – Farewell, My Lovely as Jessie Halstead Florian; Lily Tomlin – Nashville as Linnea Reese; Brenda Vaccaro – Jacqueline Susann's Once Is Not Enough as Linda Riggs
**Best Writing (Original Screenplay)**: **Dog Day Afternoon – Frank Pierson**; Amarcord – Federico Fellini and Tonino Guerra; And Now My Love – Claude Lelouch and Pierre Uytterhoeven; Lies My Father Told Me – Ted Allan; Shampoo – Warren Beatty and Robert Towne	**Best Writing (Screenplay Adapted from Other Material)**: **One Flew Over the Cuckoo's Nest – Bo Goldman and Lawrence Hauben based on the novel by Ken Kesey**; Barry Lyndon – Stanley Kubrick based on The Memoirs of Barry Lyndon, Esq. by William Makepeace Thackeray; The Man Who Would Be King – John Huston and Gladys Hill based on the story by Rudyard Kipling; Profumo di donna – Ruggero Maccari and Dino Risi based on the novel Il buio e il miele by Giovanni Arpino; The Sunshine Boys – Neil Simon based on his play
**Best Foreign Language Film**: **Dersu Uzala (Soviet Union)**; Letters from Marusia (Mexico); Profumo di donna (Italy); The Promised Land (Poland); Sandakan No. 8 (Japan)	**Best Documentary (Feature)**: **The Man Who Skied Down Everest – F. R. Crawley, James Hager and Dale Hartleben**; The California Reich – Keith Critchlow and Walter F. Parkes; Fighting for Our Lives – Glen Pearcy; The Incredible Machine – Irwin Rosten; The Other Half of the Sky: A China Memoir – Shirley MacLaine
**Best Documentary (Short Subject)**: **The End of the Game – Claire Wilbur and Robin Lehman**; Arthur and Lillie – Jon Else, Steven Kovacs and Kristine Samuelson; Millions of Years Ahead of Man – Manfred Baier; Probes in Space – George V. Casey; Whistling Smith – Barrie Howells and Michael Scott	**Best Short Film (Live Action)**: **Angel and Big Joe – Bert Salzman**; Conquest of Light – Louis Marcus; Dawn Flight – Lawrence M. Lansburgh and Brian Lansburgh; A Day in the Life of Bonnie Consolo – Barry Spinello; Doubletalk – Alan Beattie
**Best Short Film (Animated)**: **Great – Bob Godfrey**; Kick Me – Robert Swarthe; Monsieur Pointu – René Jodoin, Bernard Longpré and André Leduc; Sisyphus – Marcell Jankovics	**Best Music (Original Score)**: **Jaws – John Williams**; Birds Do It, Bees Do It – Gerald Fried; Bite the Bullet – Alex North; One Flew Over the Cuckoo's Nest – Jack Nitzsche; The Wind and the Lion – Jerry Goldsmith
**Best Music (Scoring: Original Song Score and Adaptation -or- Scoring: Adaptation)**: **Barry Lyndon – Leonard Rosenman**; Funny Lady – Peter Matz; Tommy – Pete Townshend	**Best Music (Original Song)**: **"I'm Easy" from Nashville – Music and Lyrics by Keith Carradine**; "How Lucky Can You Get" from Funny Lady – Music and Lyrics by Kander and Ebb; "Now That We’re In Love" from Whiffs – Music by George Barrie; Lyrics by Sammy Cahn; "Richard’s Window" from The Other Side of the Mountain – Music by Charles Fox; Lyrics by Norman Gimbel; "Theme from Mahogany (Do You Know Where You're Going To)" from Mahogany – Music by Michael Masser; Lyrics by Gerry Goffin
**Best Sound**: **Jaws – Robert L. Hoyt, Roger Heman, Earl Madery and John Carter**; Bite the Bullet – Arthur Piantadosi, Les Fresholtz, Richard Tyler and Al Overton Jr.; Funny Lady – Richard Portman, Don MacDougall, Curly Thirlwell and Jack Solomon; The Hindenburg – Leonard Peterson, John A. Bolger Jr., John Mack and Don K. Sharpless; The Wind and the Lion – Harry W. Tetrick, Aaron Rochin, William McCaughey and Roy Charman	**Best Art Direction**: **Barry Lyndon – Art Direction: Ken Adam and Roy Walker; Set Decoration: Vernon Dixon**; The Hindenburg – Art Direction: Edward Carfagno; Set Decoration: Frank R. McKelvy; The Man Who Would Be King – Art Direction: Alexandre Trauner and Tony Inglis; Set Decoration: Peter James; Shampoo – Art Direction: Richard Sylbert and W. Stewart Campbell; Set Decoration: George Gaines; The Sunshine Boys – Art Direction: Albert Brenner; Set Decoration: Marvin March
**Best Cinematography**: **Barry Lyndon – John Alcott**; The Day of the Locust – Conrad Hall; Funny Lady – James Wong Howe; The Hindenburg – Robert Surtees; One Flew Over the Cuckoo's Nest – Bill Butler and Haskell Wexler	**Best Costume Design**: **Barry Lyndon – Milena Canonero and Ulla-Britt Söderlund**; The Four Musketeers – Yvonne Blake and Ron Talsky; Funny Lady – Ray Aghayan and Bob Mackie; The Magic Flute – Karin Erskine and Henny Noremark; The Man Who Would Be King – Edith Head
**Best Film Editing**: **Jaws – Verna Fields**; Dog Day Afternoon – Dede Allen; The Man Who Would Be King – Russell Lloyd; One Flew Over the Cuckoo's Nest – Richard Chew, Sheldon Kahn and Lynzee Klingman; Three Days of the Condor – Don Guidice and Fredric Steinkamp

=== Special Achievement Award (Sound Effects) ===
- The Hindenburg – Peter Berkos.

=== Special Achievement Award (Visual Effects) ===
- The Hindenburg – Albert Whitlock and Glen Robinson.

=== Honorary Award ===
- To Mary Pickford in recognition of her unique contributions to the film industry and the development of film as an artistic medium.

=== Jean Hersholt Humanitarian Award ===
- Dr. Jules C. Stein

=== Irving G. Thalberg Memorial Award ===
- Mervyn LeRoy

=== Multiple nominations and awards ===
Films with multiple nominations
Nominations	Film
9	One Flew Over the Cuckoo's Nest
7	Barry Lyndon
6	Dog Day Afternoon
5	Funny Lady
5	Nashville
4	Jaws
4	The Man Who Would Be King
4	Shampoo
4	The Sunshine Boys
3	The Hindenburg (Note: Not counting the two non-competitive Special Achievement Awards for The Hindenburg.)
2	Amarcord
2	Bite the Bullet
2	The Day of the Locust
2	Profumo di donna
2	Tommy
2	The Wind and the Lion

Films with multiple awards
Awards	Film
5	One Flew Over the Cuckoo's Nest
4	Barry Lyndon
3	Jaws

== Presenters and performers ==
The following individuals, listed in order of appearance, presented awards or performed musical numbers:

=== Presenters ===
Name	Role
Hank Simms	Announcer for the 48th Academy Awards
Ray Bolger	Introducer of the President of the Academy of Motion Picture Arts & Sciences Walter Mirisch
Walter Mirisch (AMPAS President)	Gave opening remarks welcoming guests to the awards ceremony
Joel Grey; Madeline Kahn	Presenters of the award for Best Supporting Actress
Robert Blake	Presenter of the Special Achievement Award
Marisa Berenson; O. J. Simpson	Presenters of the Short Subjects Awards
Margaux Hemingway; Roy Scheider	Presenters of the award for Best Sound
Beau Bridges; Marilyn Hassett	Presenters of the Documentary Awards
Charlton Heston	Presenter of the Jean Hersholt Humanitarian Award to Dr. Jules C. Stein
Anthony Hopkins; Charlotte Rampling	Presenters of the award for Best Art Direction
Jennifer O'Neill; Telly Savalas	Presenters of the award for Best Costume Design
Linda Blair; Ben Johnson	Presenters of the award for Best Supporting Actor
Rod McKuen; Marlo Thomas	Presenters of the Music Awards
Stockard Channing; Billy Dee Williams	Presenters of the award for Best Cinematography
Isabelle Adjani; Elliott Gould	Presenters of the award for Best Film Editing
Jacqueline Bisset; Jack Valenti	Presenters of the award for Best Foreign Language Film
Burt Bacharach; Angie Dickinson	Presenters of the award for Best Original Song
William Friedkin	Presenter of the Irving G. Thalberg Memorial Award to Mervyn LeRoy
Diane Keaton; William Wyler	Presenters of the award for Best Director
Gore Vidal	Presenter of the Writing Awards
Walter Mirisch	Presenter of the Honorary Award to Mary Pickford
Charles Bronson; Jill Ireland	Presenters of the award for Best Actress
Art Carney	Presenter of the award for Best Actor
Audrey Hepburn	Presenter of the award for Best Picture
Elizabeth Taylor	Introducer of the performance of "America the Beautiful" by the Spirit of Troy

=== Performers ===
Name	Role	Performed
John Williams	Musical arranger and conductor	Orchestral
Ray Bolger	Performer	"Hollywood Honors Its Own"
Keith Carradine	Performer	"I'm Easy" from Nashville
Bernadette Peters	Performer	"How Lucky Can You Get" from Funny Lady
Steve Lawrence	Performer	"Now That We're in Love" from Whiffs
Kelly Garrett	Performer	"Richard's Window" from The Other Side of the Mountain
Diana Ross	Performer	"Theme from Mahogany (Do You Know Where You're Going To)" from Mahogany
Spirit of Troy	Performers	"America the Beautiful/That’s Entertainment!" (instrumental)

== See also ==
- 1975 in film
- 33rd Golden Globe Awards
- 29th British Academy Film Awards
- 18th Grammy Awards
- 27th Primetime Emmy Awards
- 28th Primetime Emmy Awards
- 30th Tony Awards
