= National road 58 (Poland) =

Road in Poland

Coordinates: 53°39′27″N 21°20′45″E

National Road 58
- Droga krajowa nr 58
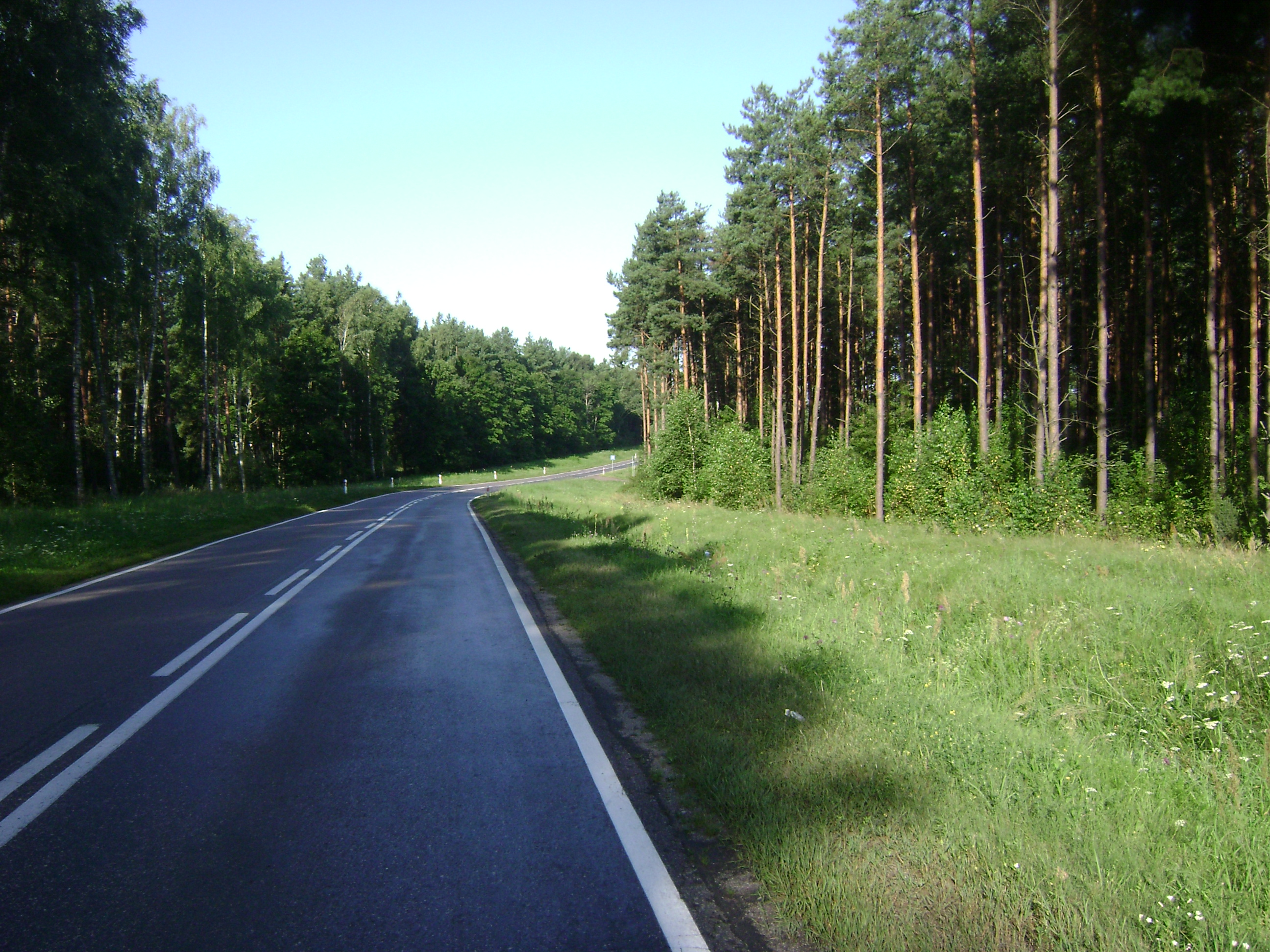

Route information
- Maintained by GDDKiA
- Length: 149 km (93 mi)

Major junctions
- East end: Olsztynek
- West end: Szczuczyn

Location
- Country: Poland
- Regions: Podlaskie Voivodeship; Warmian-Masurian Voivodeship
- Major cities: Olsztynek, Szczytno, Pisz, Szczuczyn

Highway system
- National roads in Poland; Voivodeship roads
← DK 57	→ DK 59

Droga krajowa nr 58 (translates from Polish as national road 58) – route belonging to Polish national roads network. It runs through Podlaskie and Warmian-Masurian Voivodeships, leading from junction with expressway S51 in Olsztynek through Szczytno, Ruciane-Nida, Pisz and Biała Piska to Szczuczyn where ends on crossing with road 61.

== Towns along the route ==
- Olsztynek (expressway S7, expressway S51)
- Zgniłocha
- Jedwabno
- Szczytno (national road 53, national road 57)
- Babięta
- Stare Kiełbonki (national road 59)
- Zgon
- Ruciane-Nida
- Pisz (national road 63)
- Biała Piska
- Szczuczyn (national road 61)
