= Golen =

Golen may refer to:

- Goleń, Warmian-Masurian Voivodeship, Poland
- Golen Gol Hydropower Project, Pakistan
- Cwrt Y Golen or Cwrt y Gollen, a British Army training base south-east of Crickhowell, Wales
- Ralph Golen (born 1970), Polish footballer
