= John Bolger =

John Bolger may refer to:

- John Michael Bolger (born 1956), American actor
- John A. Bolger Jr. (1908–1990), American sound engineer
