= Nowe Kiełbonki =

- Village
- Location within Poland
- Coordinates: 53°41′N 21°20′E
- Country: Poland
- Voivodeship: Warmian-Masurian
- County: Mrągowo
- Gmina: Piecki
- Population: 70
- Website: http://www.kielbonki.pl

Nowe Kiełbonki [ˈnɔvɛ kʲɛu̯ˈbɔnki] is a village in the administrative district of Gmina Piecki, within Mrągowo County, Warmian-Masurian Voivodeship, in northern Poland.
