= Zyzdrojowy Piecek =

- Village
- Location within Poland
- Coordinates: 53°40′N 21°17′E
- Country: Poland
- Voivodeship: Warmian-Masurian
- County: Mrągowo
- Gmina: Piecki

Zyzdrojowy Piecek [zɨzdrɔˈjɔvɨ ˈpjɛt͡sɛk] is a village in the administrative district of Gmina Piecki, within Mrągowo County, Warmian-Masurian Voivodeship, in northern Poland.
