= Ernst A. Lehmann =

German Zeppelin captain

Ernst August Lehmann
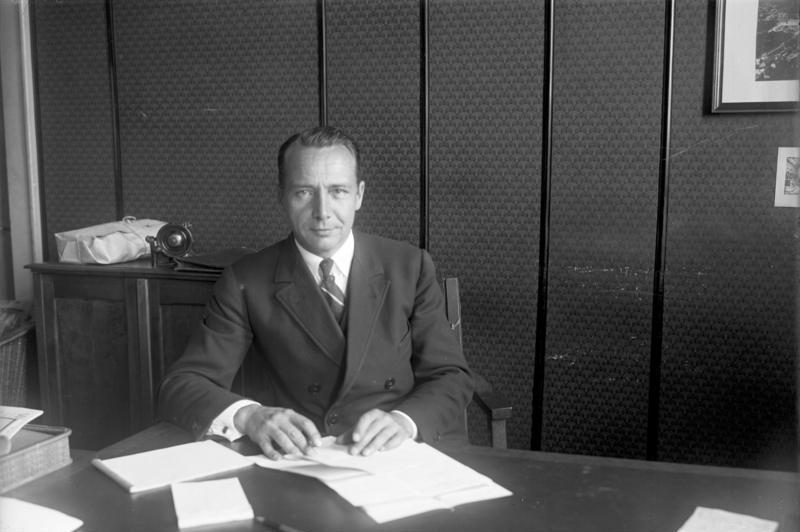
- Born: 12 May 1886; Ludwigshafen am Rhein, German Empire
- Died: 7 May 1937 (aged 50); Lakewood, New Jersey, US
- Cause of death: Injuries sustained in the Hindenburg disaster

Captain Ernst August Lehmann (12 May 1886 – 7 May 1937) was a German Zeppelin captain. He was one of the most famous and experienced figures in German airship travel. The Pittsburgh Press called Lehmann the best airship pilot in the world, although he was criticized by Hugo Eckener for often making dangerous maneuvers that compromised the airships. He was a victim of the Hindenburg disaster in 1937.

== Pre-war experience ==
Ernst Lehmann was born in 1886 in Ludwigshafen am Rhein. At the age of 14, he decided that he wanted to build ships. He studied engineering at the Technische Hochschule Berlin and received his degree in 1912. By this time, he had already joined the navy and had attained the rank of naval reserve lieutenant.

Upon graduation, he began work at the Imperial Dockyards in Kiel. He did not find this work satisfying so, encouraged by Dr. Hugo Eckener, he joined the DELAG to serve as pilot of the passenger airship LZ 17 Sachsen. He commanded a total of 550 flights of this ship.

== Service during World War I ==
During the First World War, Captain Lehmann commanded army and navy airships, beginning with the Sachsen after it had been taken over by the Army, followed by the LZ XII, and finally the navy ships LZ 90, LZ 98, and LZ 120. His attack on Antwerp (Belgium) on August 25/26 (during the night) was the first bombing from the air of civilians in world history, killing 10 people.

== Post-war commercial airship travel ==
After the war, Captain Lehmann continued his involvement with the airships, which were returned to civilian use. He made preparations to fly the naval airship L 72 on the first transatlantic crossing of an airship in 1919, but permission was denied by the German government. In 1920, he spent six months in Sweden studying the economics of an airship line between Stockholm and the Mediterranean, with a stopover in Friedrichshafen. These plans were never realized.

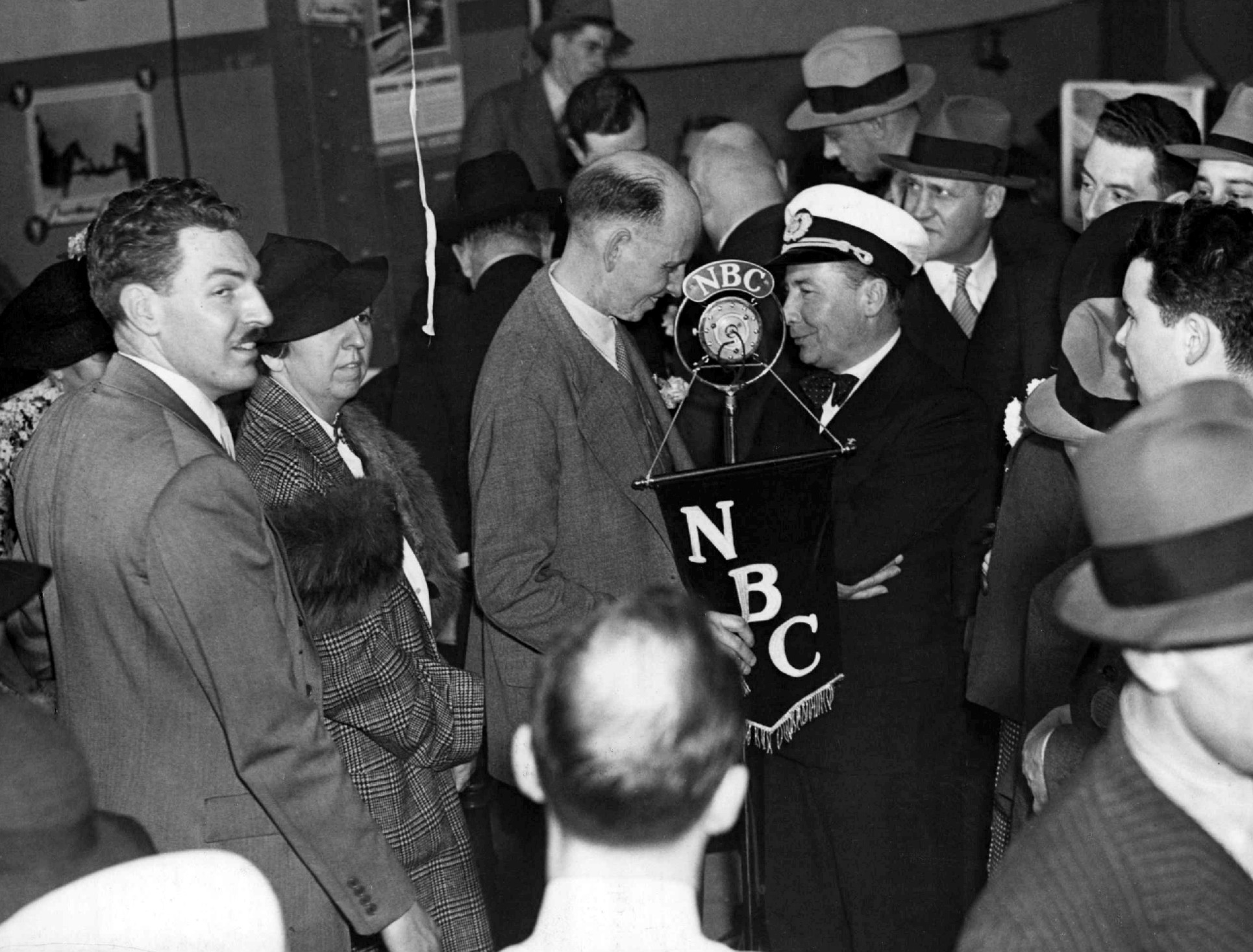
Captain Lehmann is interviewed by NBC after the first US landing of the Hindenburg on 9 May 1936.

In 1921 he spent four months in the United States to prepare for a planned New York to Chicago airship route, and in 1922 he tried to negotiate with the United States and England for a route to go over North Atlantic .

With the founding of the Goodyear Zeppelin Corporation in 1923, Captain Lehmann served as Vice President in charge of engineering. In 1924, Captain Lehmann was second-in-command of LZ 126 on the first nonstop transatlantic flight between the European and American mainlands. The purpose of the flight was to deliver the Zeppelin to its new owners, the United States Navy, who rechristened the ship USS Los Angeles.

By 1929, Lehmann had filed a declaration of intent to become a United States citizen, but changed his mind when he was given charge of the Hindenburg in 1936.

In 1935, when Hermann Göring created the Deutsche Zeppelin Reederei to increase Nazi influence over zeppelin operations, Captain Lehmann was named director of the new airline.

Captain Lehmann served as commanding officer on more than 100 of the flights of the Graf Zeppelin between 1928 and 1936. In 1936, he commanded 10 round-trip flights to Lakehurst on the new Hindenburg. Captain Lehmann was a skilled accordion player, which he often used to entertain passengers on long flights with renditions of Wagner pieces or German folk songs.

== Death ==
Although Max Pruss was the commanding officer of the last flight of the Hindenburg, Captain Lehmann was the most senior officer on board, but was there only as an observer. He was severely burned when the Zeppelin caught fire at Lakehurst on 6 May 1937, and died the following morning. It was initially believed that Lehmann would recover from his injuries; he was scheduled to be transferred from a local hospital to one in New York City for further treatment, until he took a sudden turn for the worse overnight and died early in the morning.

At his death, he apparently believed that the Hindenburg was sabotaged. He came out of the burning wreckage saying "I don't understand it." During a deathbed conversation with Commander Charles Emery Rosendahl, he said "It must have been an infernal machine." Lehmann's two-year-old son had died on Easter Sunday, 28 March 1937, a few weeks prior to the Hindenburg's last crossing, and he did not really want to make the voyage. Lehmann accepted the assignment with the hope that by doing so he might have the opportunity to speak to U.S. authorities about the use of helium gas in the German airships.

== Criticism ==
Lehmann often came into conflict with Hugo Eckener over the safety of his piloting techniques. Lehmann cancelled important flight tests for the Hindenburg to fulfill a request by the Nazi Ministry of Propaganda for the Hindenburg and the Graf Zeppelin to take part in a propaganda flight (Deutschlandfahrt) in support of Adolf Hitler. Lehmann insisted on making the flight despite unfavorable weather conditions, which resulted in high winds damaging the Hindenburg's lower fin as the airship was being removed from its hangar. Eckener criticised Lehmann harshly and publicly for endangering the new airship and the entire zeppelin program to impress the Nazis. However, Lehmann never actually joined the Nazi Party despite his apparent support and may have only pretended to be sympathetic to the regime. (Of the seven active Zeppelin commanders, only Max Pruss and Anton Wittemann were Party members of the NSDAP).

After the loss of the Hindenburg, Eckener blamed Pruss for his handling of the airship but also suggested that Lehmann was responsible for pressuring Pruss to make the flight, although Eckener did not rule out other causes. After investigating the disaster himself, Eckener testified to the inquiry that a sharp S-turn during the landing procedure might have caused a bracing wire to break and tear a gasbag, and resulted in mixture of hydrogen with air, which then likely was ignited by an electrostatic discharge.

== Portrayals ==
In the 1975 film The Hindenburg, Captain Lehmann was portrayed by American actor Richard Dysart, although this portrayal is inaccurate with Lehmann appearing to be quite wary of the Nazis, whereas the real Lehmann was a well-known Nazi supporter, at least publicly. In the 2007 docudrama Hindenburg: The Untold Story, Polish actor Aleksander Trabczynski portrayed Lehmann. In the fictional 2011 RTL television movie of the disaster, he was portrayed by Ulrich Noethen. In this film, he supports the Gestapo in their brutal torture of Merten Kroger for the alleged murder of a passenger, but orders his release upon seeing proof of a bomb aboard the ship. During the landing approach, he pushes the landing approach and ignores Kroger's warning that putting stress on the ship's frame would be dangerous, saying it's "less dangerous than a bomb going off". He is proven wrong when although the bomb is defused, the airship explodes due to static electricity.

== Books ==
Captain Lehmann published his first book in English with Howard Mingos in New York and in 1927 it was reprinted in London. The Zeppelins: The Development of the Airship, with the Story of the Zeppelin Air Raids in the World War.

Captain Lehmann recounts his personal experiences as a zeppelin captain in war and peace in Auf Luftpatrouille und Weltfahrt: Erlebnisse eines Zeppelin Fuhrers in Krieg und Frieden.

Captain Lehmann's last book, Zeppelin: The Story of Lighter-than-air Craft, was being translated by Leonhard Adelt, who was on board with Lehmann as a guest during the Hindenburg's last flight. The book had recently been published in German when the Hindenburg was destroyed. The English translation, completed by Jay Dratler, was published later in 1937 with a preface and closing chapter by the American airship captain Charles E. Rosendahl, who had interviewed Lehmann on his deathbed.
