= Max Pruss =

German airship captain (1891–1960)

- Born: 13 September 1891; Sgonn, East Prussia, German Empire
- Died: 28 November 1960 (aged 69); Frankfurt am Main, West Germany
- Occupation: Airship captain
- Employer: Deutsche Zeppelin-Reederei GmbH
- Known for: Captain of LZ 129 Hindenburg

Max Pruss (13 September 1891 – 28 November 1960) was the captain of the Zeppelin LZ 129 Hindenburg on its last voyage and a surviving crew member of the disaster.

== Biography ==
Max Pruss was born in 1891 in Sgonn, East Prussia (now Zgon, Warmian-Masurian Voivodeship, Poland). He joined the German Navy in 1906 and completed airship training during World War I, serving as an elevatorman on the German Zeppelins. Pruss became part of the Hindenburg crew in 1936 on the third flight to Rio de Janeiro. During his career, he flew 171 times over the Atlantic. The final flight of the Hindenburg was May 3–6, 1937, and it was Pruss' first flight as commanding Captain of the "Hindenburg". According to Airships.net he was a member of the NSDAP. He died at age 69.

== Hindenburg disaster ==
Pruss was commander of the airship during the Hindenburg disaster of 6 May 1937. This was his first time commanding a trip to Lakehurst. Pruss and several crew members rode the Hindenburg down to the ground as it burned, then ordered everybody out. He carried radio operator Willy Speck out of the wreckage, then looked for survivors until rescuers forcibly restrained him. Pruss suffered extensive burns and had to be taken out by ambulance to Paul Kimball Hospital in Lakewood. The burns were so severe that he was given last rites, but although his face was disfigured for the rest of his life, his condition improved over the next few months. Pruss was unable to testify at investigative committees, but officially he was not held responsible.

Pruss, along with other airship crewmen, maintained that the disaster was caused by sabotage, and dismissed the possibility that it was sparked by lightning or static electricity. Although Master Zeppelin Captain Hugo Eckener did not rule out other causes, he criticized Pruss' decision to carry out the landing in poor weather conditions, expressing his belief that sharp turns ordered by Pruss during the landing approach may have caused gas to leak, which could have been ignited by static electricity. Pruss insisted that such turns were normal procedure, and that the stern heaviness experienced during the approach was normal due to rainwater being displaced at the tail. It has been suggested that Pruss maintained his belief of sabotage because of guilt or to maintain his own credibility and that of the airship business.

== After the Hindenburg ==
Pruss returned to Germany around October 1937, where he served as commandant of Frankfurt Airport as World War II broke out. By this time he was already urging the modernization of Germany's remaining Zeppelin fleet, and during a 1940 visit by Hermann Göring to Frankfurt Airport this was the subject of an alleged quarrel between Pruss and Göring. In the 1950s Pruss tried to raise money for new Zeppelin construction, citing the comfort and luxury of this mode of transportation. He died in 1960 of pneumonia after a stomach operation. Pruss did not see his dream realized, as his death was over 30 years before the construction of a new airship at the Friedrichshafen complex by Zeppelin Neue Technologie (NT).

== Portrayals ==
In the 1975 film, The Hindenburg, Pruss was portrayed by Charles Durning. This portrayal is inaccurate because Pruss is portrayed as ignoring the advice of the 2nd Captain Ernst Lehmann, who only traveled as an observer, saying "I'll do the worrying on this trip". In the docudrama Hindenburg: The Untold Story he was portrayed by Albert Welling. In the 2011 RTL television movie he is portrayed by Jürgen Schornagel.

The Hindenburg is featured in the series Beyond Belief: Fact or Fiction as the setting of a story in which a married couple ride on the airship while recounting to friends of theirs how years ago they escaped certain death when they missed a trip on the doomed Passenger Liner RMS Lusitania.

In the pilot episode of the TV series Timeless Pruss was featured but not mentioned by name.
