= Peter Berkos =

American sound editor (1922–2024)

- Publicity Photo of Peter Berkos
- Born: August 15, 1922; Cicero, Illinois, U.S.
- Died: January 2, 2024 (aged 101); Rancho Bernardo, San Diego, California, U.S.
- Occupation: Sound editor
- Years active: 1938–1987
- Spouse: Sally Berkos (died 2000)

Peter Berkos (August 15, 1922 – January 2, 2024) was an American sound editor. He received the Special Achievement Academy Award during the 1975 Academy Awards for the film The Hindenburg. This was for the Sound Editing of the film. In 1996, he received the Lifetime Achievement award at the Motion Picture Sound Editors awards. He also did the sound effects for the original Battlestar Galactica, as well as the TV movies of Buck Rogers in the 25th Century.

Berkos retired from editing in 1987, but reinvented himself as a novelist, with books published in 2007 and 2013. He lived in Rancho Bernardo, California, and turned 100 on August 15, 2022. Berkos died in Rancho Bernardo on January 2, 2024, at the age of 101. He was remembered as, "the Universal Pictures sound effects maestro and champion of sound editors everywhere who shared a special achievement Oscar for his work on the Robert Wise-directed disaster epic The Hindenburg."

== Selected filmography ==
- Into the Night (1985)
- Nightmares (1983)
- Voyager from the Unknown (1984)
- The Four Seasons (1981)
- The Last Married Couple in America (1980)
- Buck Rogers in the 25th Century (1979)
- Battlestar Galactica (1978)
- House Calls (1978)
- Gray Lady Down (1978)
- Slap Shot (1977)
- Which Way Is Up? (1977)
- Car Wash (1976)
- The Great Waldo Pepper (1975)
- The Hindenburg (1975)
- The Sting (1973)
- Short Walk to Daylight (1972)
- Airport (1970)
- Sweet Charity (1969)
- Coogan's Bluff (1968)
- Thoroughly Modern Millie (1967)
- Touch of Evil (1958)
- The Lady Takes a Flyer (1957)
- Tammy and the Bachelor (1957)
- The Creature Walks Among Us (1957)
- Angels with Dirty Faces (1938)
