= Gmina Piecki =

Gmina Piecki Piecki Commune
- Gmina
- Flag Coat of arms
- Interactive map of Gmina Piecki
- Coordinates (Piecki): 53°44′53″N 21°20′28″E
- Country: Poland
- Voivodeship: Warmian-Masurian
- County: Mrągowo
- Seat: Piecki

Area
  - Total: 314.59 km^{2} (121.46 sq mi)

Population (2006)
  - Total: 7,769
  - Density: 24.70/km^{2} (63.96/sq mi)
- Website: https://www.gminapiecki.pl/

Gmina Piecki is a rural gmina (administrative district) in Mrągowo County, Warmian-Masurian Voivodeship, in northern Poland. Its seat is the village of Piecki, which lies approximately 14 kilometres (9 mi) south of Mrągowo and 56 km (35 mi) east of the regional capital Olsztyn.

The gmina covers an area of 314.59 square kilometres (121.5 sq mi), and as of 2006 its total population is 7,769.

The gmina contains part of the protected area called Masurian Landscape Park.

== Villages ==
Gmina Piecki contains the villages and settlements of Babięta, Bobrówko, Brejdyny, Chostka, Cierzpięty, Czaszkowo, Dłużec, Dobry Lasek, Gajne, Gant, Głogno, Goleń, Jakubowo, Jeleń, Kołowinek, Krawno, Krutyń, Krutyński Piecek, Krzywy Róg, Ławny Lasek, Łętowo, Lipowo, Machary, Mojtyny, Mostek, Nawiady, Nowe Kiełbonki, Nowy Zyzdrój, Ostrów Pieckowski, Piecki, Piersławek, Pilnik, Probark Mały, Prusinowo, Rosocha, Rostek, Rutkowo, Stare Kiełbonki, Świnie Oko, Szklarnia, Wólka Prusinowska, Żabieniec, Zakręt, Zgon, Zielony Lasek, Zyzdrojowa Wola and Zyzdrojowy Piecek.

== Neighbouring gminas ==
Gmina Piecki is bordered by the gminas of Dźwierzuty, Mikołajki, Mrągowo, Ruciane-Nida, Sorkwity and Świętajno.
