= Angel and Big Joe =

1975 film

- Film poster
- Directed by: Bert Salzman
- Written by: Bert Salzman
- Produced by: Doro Bachrach; Bert Salzman
- Starring: Paul Sorvino; Dadi Pinero
- Cinematography: Paul Glickman
- Edited by: Armond Lebowitz
- Music by: Harry Manfredini; Arlon Ober
- Production company: Learning Corporation of America
- Release date: 1975
- Running time: 27 minutes
- Country: United States
- Language: English

Angel and Big Joe is a 1975 American short drama film directed by Bert Salzman and starring Paul Sorvino and Dadi Pinero. It won an Oscar at the 48th Academy Awards in 1976 for Best Short Subject.

== Premise ==
Angel (Dadi Pinero) portrays a young Chicano migrant worker, while Big Joe (Paul Sorvino) is a telephone lineman. Angel feels that he can trust no one, but Big Joe sets out to prove him wrong.

== Cast ==
- Paul Sorvino as Big Joe
- Dadi Pinero as Angel
- Gloria Irizarry as Mother
- Nicky Irizarry (also known as Dr. Nick Karapasas) as Nicky

== Reception ==
Angel and Big Joe was named to the list of ALA Notable Children's Videos in 1975.
