= Lipowo, Mrągowo County =

Lipowo
- Village
- Location within Poland
- Coordinates: 53°46′32″N 21°26′30″E
- Country: Poland
- Voivodeship: Warmian-Masurian
- County: Mrągowo
- Gmina: Piecki
- Population: 240

Lipowo ([liˈpɔvɔ]; German: Lindendorf) is a village in the administrative district of Gmina Piecki, within Mrągowo County, Warmian-Masurian Voivodeship, in northern Poland.
