= Richard Dysart =

American actor (1929–2015)

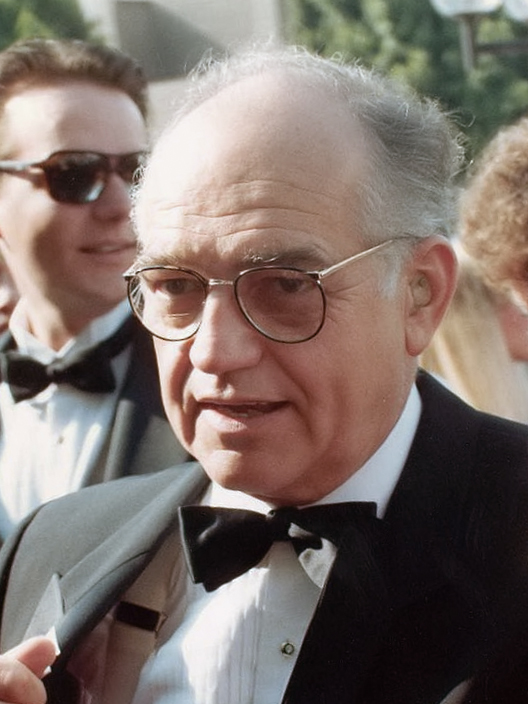
- Dysart in 1988
- Born: Richard Allen Dysart; March 30, 1929; Boston, Massachusetts, U.S.
- Died: April 5, 2015 (aged 86); Santa Monica, California, U.S.
- Other name: Richard A. Dysart
- Education: Cony High School; Gould Academy; Emerson College; George Washington University
- Occupation: Actor
- Years active: 1953–2004
- Spouse: Kathryn Jacobi (m. 1987)
- Children: 1

Richard Allen Dysart (March 30, 1929 – April 5, 2015) was an American actor. He is best known for his role as senior partner Leland McKenzie in the television series L.A. Law (1986–1994), for which he won a 1992 Primetime Emmy Award as Outstanding Supporting Actor in a Drama Series after four consecutive nominations. In film, he held supporting roles in The Hospital (1971), Being There (1979), The Thing (1982), Mask (1985), Pale Rider (1985) and Wall Street (1987).

== Early life ==
Richard Dysart was born to Alice (née Hennigar) and Douglas Dysart, a podiatrist, near Boston, Massachusetts, on March 30, 1929. Dysart was raised in Skowhegan, Maine and Augusta, Maine. He attended Gould Academy in Bethel, Maine. At the encouragement of his mother, Dysart performed in summer stock at the Lakewood Theater near Skowhegan. He also worked at a local radio station.

He earned both bachelor's (1956) and master's (1981) in speech communication from Emerson College in Boston, although his undergraduate education was interrupted due to his service for four years in the United States Air Force during the Korean War. At Emerson he performed on stage, and he was a class officer and student government vice-president. He was a brother of the Phi Alpha Tau fraternity. He also studied at George Washington University. He returned for his master's degree later, completing it in 1981.

== Career ==
Dysart's acting career began on the stage. He was a founding member of the American Conservatory Theater in San Francisco, which began in 1965. He performed on Broadway in All in Good Time (1965) and A Place Without Doors (1970–1971), and a revival of The Little Foxes (1967–1968) as Horace Giddens, alongside Anne Bancroft. Dysart played the role of Coach in the original Broadway production of Jason Miller's Pulitzer Prize-winning play That Championship Season, alongside Charles Durning and Paul Sorvino, from 1972 to 1974.

In 1979, Dysart portrayed a good-hearted physician treating a dying billionaire in the film Being There, starring Peter Sellers and Melvyn Douglas. In 1980, he played Abraham Lincoln's Secretary of War Edwin Stanton in the television film The Ordeal of Dr. Mudd. He voiced the kindly miner Uncle Pom in the Disney English-language version of Hayao Miyazaki's 1986 adventure classic Castle in the Sky, and the character of Cogliostro on Todd McFarlane's Spawn: The Animated Series, which aired on HBO.

His other movie credits included roles in The Hindenburg (as Ernst A. Lehmann), An Enemy of the People, Prophecy, The Thing (directed by John Carpenter), Pale Rider (directed by Clint Eastwood), and Day One (with L.A. Law co-star Michael Tucker). He appeared in an episode of the 1976 television series Sara.

== Honors and awards ==
Dysart received a Drama Desk Award in 1972 for his role as Coach in That Championship Season.

Dysart was nominated four years in a row for Primetime Emmy Award for Outstanding Supporting Actor in a Drama Series between 1989 and 1992, for his role as Leland McKenzie on L.A. Law, winning in 1992.

== Personal life and death ==
Dysart was married three times. The first two marriages resulted in divorce. He and his third wife, artist Kathryn Jacobi, were married from 1987 until his death. He had no children of his own, but had a stepson from his third wife and two step-grandchildren.

Dysart died at home in Santa Monica, California on April 5, 2015, after a long battle with cancer. He was 86 years old.

== Selected filmography ==
- Love with the Proper Stranger (1963) – Accountant (uncredited)
- Petulia (1968) – Motel Receptionist
- The Lost Man (1969) – Barnes
- The Sporting Club (1971) – Spengler
- The Hospital (1971) – Dr. Welbeck
- All In The Family (1972) – Russ DeKuyper
- The Autobiography of Miss Jane Pittman (1974, TV Movie) – Master Bryant
- The Terminal Man (1974) – Dr. John Ellis
- The Crazy World of Julius Vrooder (1974) – Father
- The Day of the Locust (1975) – Claude Estee
- The Hindenburg (1975) – Captain Ernst A. Lehmann
- It Happened One Christmas (1977, TV Movie) – Peter Bailey
- An Enemy of the People (1978) – Aslaksen
- Prophecy (1979) – Isely
- Meteor (1979) – Secretary of Defense
- Being There (1979) – Dr. Robert Allenby
- Bitter Harvest (1981) – Dr. Morton Freeman
- The Thing (1982) – Dr. Copper
- The Falcon and the Snowman (1985) – Dr. Daulton Lee
- Mask (1985) – Abe
- Malice in Wonderland (1985, TV Movie) – Louis B. Mayer
- Pale Rider (1985) – Coy LaHood
- Warning Sign (1985) – Dr. Nielsen
- Blood & Orchids (1986, TV Movie) – Harvey Koster
- Castle in the Sky (1986) – Uncle Pom (English version, voice)
- The Last Days of Patton (1986, TV Movie) – Gen. Dwight D. Eisenhower
- Wall Street (1987) – Cromwell
- Day One (1989, TV Movie) – President Harry S. Truman
- War and Remembrance (1989, TV Movie) – President Harry S Truman
- Back to the Future Part III (1990) – Barbwire Salesman
- Panther (1995) – J. Edgar Hoover
- Truman (1995, TV Movie) – Henry L. Stimson
- Todd McFarlane's Spawn (1997) – Cogliostro (voice)
- Hard Rain (1998) – Henry Sears
- Todd McFarlane's Spawn 2 (1998) – Cogliostro (voice)
- Todd McFarlane's Spawn 3: The Ultimate Battle (1999) – Cogliostro (voice)
- L.A. Law: The Movie (2002, TV Movie) – Leland McKenzie
- Proteus (2004, Documentary) – The Ancient Mariner (voice)
