= Krutyń =

- Village
- Location within Poland
- Coordinates: 53°41′14″N 21°25′48″E
- Country: Poland
- Voivodeship: Warmian-Masurian
- County: Mrągowo
- Gmina: Piecki
- Population: 260
- Website: http://krutyn.eu

Krutyń [ˈkrutɨɲ] is a village in the administrative district of Gmina Piecki, within Mrągowo County, Warmian-Masurian Voivodeship, in northern Poland.
