= Szklarnia, Mrągowo County =

Szklarnia
- Village
- Location within Poland
- Coordinates: 53°45′48″N 21°17′20″E
- Country: Poland
- Voivodeship: Warmian-Masurian
- County: Mrągowo
- Gmina: Piecki

Szklarnia [ˈʂklarɲa] is a village in the administrative district of Gmina Piecki, within Mrągowo County, Warmian-Masurian Voivodeship, in northern Poland.
