= Rutkowo, Mrągowo County =

Rutkowo
- Settlement
- Location within Poland
- Coordinates: 53°45′14″N 21°13′31″E
- Country: Poland
- Voivodeship: Warmian-Masurian
- County: Mrągowo
- Gmina: Piecki

Rutkowo [rutˈkɔvɔ] is a settlement in the administrative district of Gmina Piecki, within Mrągowo County, Warmian-Masurian Voivodeship, in northern Poland.
