= Jeleń, Mrągowo County =

Jeleń
- Settlement
- Location within Poland
- Coordinates: 53°44′30″N 21°19′22″E
- Country: Poland
- Voivodeship: Warmian-Masurian
- County: Mrągowo
- Gmina: Piecki

Jeleń [ˈjɛlɛɲ] is a settlement in the administrative district of Gmina Piecki, within Mrągowo County, Warmian-Masurian Voivodeship, in northern Poland.
