= Prusinowo, Mrągowo County =

Prusinowo
- Village
- Location within Poland
- Coordinates: 53°42′N 21°19′E
- Country: Poland
- Voivodeship: Warmian-Masurian
- County: Mrągowo
- Gmina: Piecki

Prusinowo [pruɕiˈnɔvɔ] is a village in the administrative district of Gmina Piecki, within Mrągowo County, Warmian-Masurian Voivodeship, in northern Poland.
