= Nawiady =

- Village
- Location within Poland
- Coordinates: 53°43′N 21°19′E
- Country: Poland
- Voivodeship: Warmian-Masurian
- County: Mrągowo
- Gmina: Piecki

Nawiady [naˈvjadɨ] is a village in the administrative district of Gmina Piecki, within Mrągowo County, Warmian-Masurian Voivodeship, in northern Poland.

On 1 May 1981, the local Protestant church was charged and forcefully taken over by Catholics.
