= Gant, Poland =

Gant
- Village
- Location within Poland
- Coordinates: 53°43′N 21°12′E
- Country: Poland
- Voivodeship: Warmian-Masurian
- County: Mrągowo
- Gmina: Piecki
- Population: 60,889

Gant [ɡant] is a village in the administrative district of Gmina Piecki, within Mrągowo County, Warmian-Masurian Voivodeship, in northern Poland.
