= Łętowo, Warmian-Masurian Voivodeship =

Łętowo
- Settlement
- Location within Poland
- Coordinates: 53°43′54″N 21°17′18″E
- Country: Poland
- Voivodeship: Warmian-Masurian
- County: Mrągowo
- Gmina: Piecki

Łętowo [wɛnˈtɔvɔ] is a settlement in the administrative district of Gmina Piecki, within Mrągowo County, Warmian-Masurian Voivodeship, in northern Poland.
