= Zielony Lasek, Mrągowo County =

Zielony Lasek
- Settlement
- Location within Poland
- Coordinates: 53°40′17″N 21°26′04″E
- Country: Poland
- Voivodeship: Warmian-Masurian
- County: Mrągowo
- Gmina: Piecki

Zielony Lasek (Polish: [ʑɛˈlɔnɨ ˈlasɛk]) is a settlement in the administrative district of Gmina Piecki, within Mrągowo County, Warmian-Masurian Voivodeship, in northern Poland.
