= Zyzdrojowa Wola =

- Settlement
- Location within Poland
- Coordinates: 53°40′N 21°18′E
- Country: Poland
- Voivodeship: Warmian-Masurian
- County: Mrągowo
- Gmina: Piecki

Zyzdrojowa Wola [zɨzdrɔˈjɔva ˈvɔla] is a settlement in the administrative district of Gmina Piecki, within Mrągowo County, Warmian-Masurian Voivodeship, in northern Poland.
