= Rosocha, Warmian-Masurian Voivodeship =

Rosocha
- Village
- Location within Poland
- Coordinates: 53°39′43″N 21°26′22″E
- Country: Poland
- Voivodeship: Warmian-Masurian
- County: Mrągowo
- Gmina: Piecki

Rosocha [rɔˈsɔxa] is a village in the administrative district of Gmina Piecki, within Mrągowo County, Warmian-Masurian Voivodeship, in northern Poland.
