= Rostek, Mrągowo County =

Rostek
- Settlement
- Location within Poland
- Coordinates: 53°39′09″N 21°27′31″E
- Country: Poland
- Voivodeship: Warmian-Masurian
- County: Mrągowo
- Gmina: Piecki
- Time zone: UTC+1 (CET)
  - Summer (DST): UTC+2 (CEST)

Rostek [ˈrɔstɛk] is a settlement in the administrative district of Gmina Piecki, within Mrągowo County, Warmian-Masurian Voivodeship, in northern Poland.
