= Piecki, Warmian-Masurian Voivodeship =

Piecki
- Village
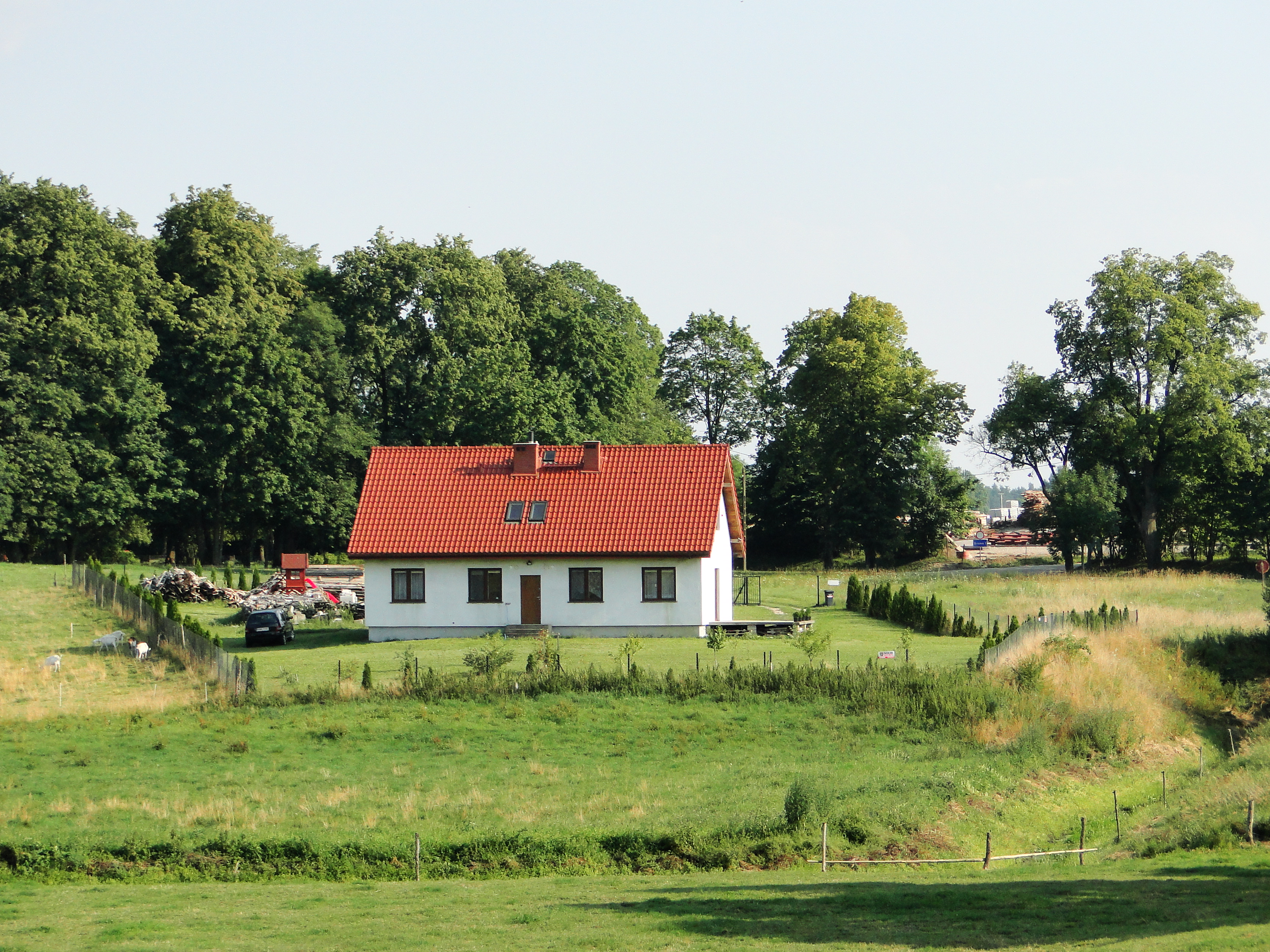

- Location within Poland
- Coordinates: 53°44′53″N 21°20′28″E
- Country: Poland
- Voivodeship: Warmian-Masurian
- County: Mrągowo
- Gmina: Piecki
- Founded: 1401

Population
  - Total: 2,610
- Time zone: UTC+1 (CET)
  - Summer (DST): UTC+2 (CEST)
- Vehicle registration: NMR

Piecki [ˈpjɛt͡ski] is a village in Mrągowo County, Warmian-Masurian Voivodeship, in north-eastern Poland. It is the seat of the gmina (administrative district) called Gmina Piecki. It is located in Masuria.

== History ==
The origins of the village date back to 1401, when Piecio (Piecek) from Muszaki and Jakusz from Radomino were granted 45 and 15 włókas of land, respectively, to establish a village. It was named after one its co-founders.

Two Polish citizens were murdered by Nazi Germany in the village during World War II.

== Notable people ==
- Natalia Nykiel (born 1995), Polish singer and songwriter
