= Probark Mały =

- Settlement
- Location within Poland
- Coordinates: 53°48′N 21°21′E
- Country: Poland
- Voivodeship: Warmian-Masurian
- County: Mrągowo
- Gmina: Piecki

Probark Mały [ˈprɔbark ˈmawɨ] is a settlement in the administrative district of Gmina Piecki, within Mrągowo County, Warmian-Masurian Voivodeship, in northern Poland.
