= Krutyński Piecek =

- Village
- Location within Poland
- Coordinates: 53°41′N 21°26′E
- Country: Poland
- Voivodeship: Warmian-Masurian
- County: Mrągowo
- Gmina: Piecki
- Population: 140

Krutyński Piecek [kruˈtɨɲski ˈpjɛt͡sɛk] is a village in the administrative district of Gmina Piecki, within Mrągowo County, Warmian-Masurian Voivodeship, in northern Poland.
