= Zgon, Warmian-Masurian Voivodeship =

Zgon
- Village
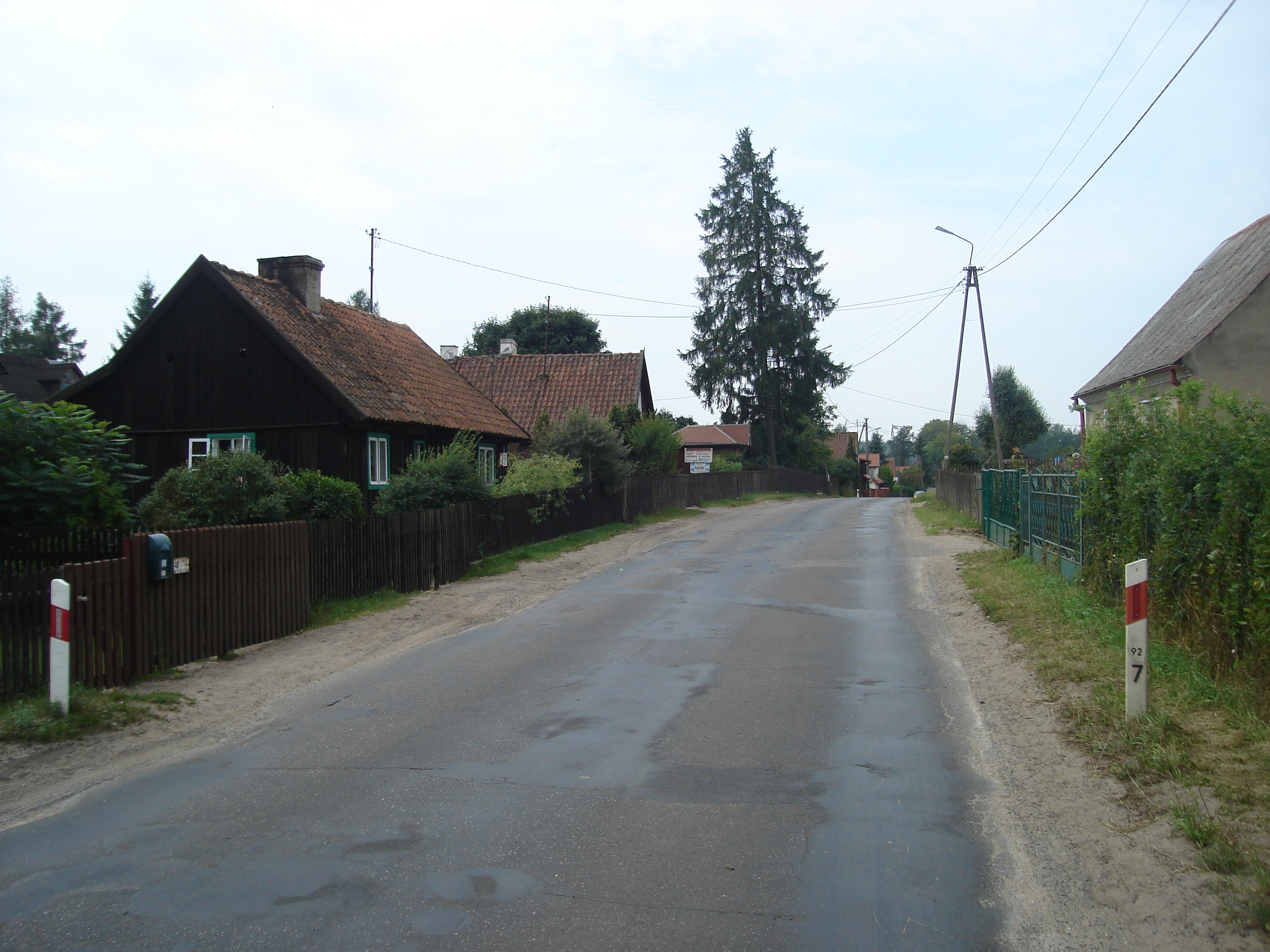

- Location within Poland
- Coordinates: 53°39′N 21°24′E
- Country: Poland
- Voivodeship: Warmian-Masurian
- County: Mrągowo
- Gmina: Piecki
- Population: 137 (2,011)

Zgon [zɡɔn] is a village in the administrative district of Gmina Piecki, within Mrągowo County, Warmian-Masurian Voivodeship, in northern Poland. The village lies on national road 58.

Close to the village, there is the bird sanctuary "Czaplisko-Lawny Lasek" (Little Wood with Herons) and the following landmarks: the "Royal Pine Tree", "The Lake Mokre Shore Oak" (Wet Lake) and the "Lovers Couple", two nested trees, that is an oak whose branches enclose a pine.

== Notable residents ==
- Max Pruss (1891-1960), Captain of LZ 129 Hindenburg
- Erich Rudnick (1916-1988), Wehrmacht officer
