= Żabieniec, Warmian-Masurian Voivodeship =

Żabieniec
- Settlement
- Location within Poland
- Coordinates: 53°48′09″N 21°23′06″E
- Country: Poland
- Voivodeship: Warmian-Masurian
- County: Mrągowo
- Gmina: Piecki

Żabieniec [ʐaˈbjɛɲɛt͡s] is a settlement in the administrative district of Gmina Piecki, within Mrągowo County, Warmian-Masurian Voivodeship, in northern Poland.
