= Kołowinek =

- Village
- Location within Poland
- Coordinates: 53°44′33″N 21°25′53″E
- Country: Poland
- Voivodeship: Warmian-Masurian
- County: Mrągowo
- Gmina: Piecki

Kołowinek [kɔwɔˈvinɛk] is a village in the administrative district of Gmina Piecki, within Mrągowo County, Warmian-Masurian Voivodeship, in northern Poland.
