= Krzywy Róg, Warmian-Masurian Voivodeship =

Krzywy Róg
- Settlement
- Location within Poland
- Coordinates: 53°46′N 21°18′E
- Country: Poland
- Voivodeship: Warmian-Masurian
- County: Mrągowo
- Gmina: Piecki
- Time zone: UTC+1 (CET)
  - Summer (DST): UTC+2 (CEST)
- Vehicle registration: NMR

Krzywy Róg [ˈkʂɨvɨ ˈruk] is a settlement in the administrative district of Gmina Piecki, within Mrągowo County, Warmian-Masurian Voivodeship, in northern Poland. It is located in Masuria.

The village was historically inhabited by Polish people since its foundation. The Polish noble families of Uklański and Wytyński lived in the village.
