= Ostrów Pieckowski =

- Settlement
- Location within Poland
- Coordinates: 53°46′N 21°20′E
- Country: Poland
- Voivodeship: Warmian-Masurian
- County: Mrągowo
- Gmina: Piecki

Ostrów Pieckowski [ˈɔstruf pjɛt͡sˈkɔfski] is a settlement in the administrative district of Gmina Piecki, within Mrągowo County, Warmian-Masurian Voivodeship, in northern Poland.
