= Ławny Lasek =

- Settlement
- Location within Poland
- Coordinates: 53°39′N 21°22′E
- Country: Poland
- Voivodeship: Warmian-Masurian
- County: Mrągowo
- Gmina: Piecki
- Website: http://www.lawny-lasek.mazury.pl

Ławny Lasek [ˈwavnɨ ˈlasɛk] is a settlement in the administrative district of Gmina Piecki, within Mrągowo County, Warmian-Masurian Voivodeship, in northern Poland.
