= Dobry Lasek =

- Village
- Location within Poland
- Coordinates: 53°44′N 21°24′E
- Country: Poland
- Voivodeship: Warmian-Masurian
- County: Mrągowo
- Gmina: Piecki

Dobry Lasek [ˈdɔbrɨ ˈlasɛk] is a village in the administrative district of Gmina Piecki, within Mrągowo County, Warmian-Masurian Voivodeship, in northern Poland.
