= Proteus (2004 film) =

- Directed by: David Lebrun
- Written by: David Lebrun
- Produced by: David Lebrun
- Starring: Corey Burton, Richard Dysart, Phil Proctor, James Warwick
- Narrated by: Marian Seldes
- Music by: Yuval Ron
- Release date: 2004
- Running time: 60 minutes
- Country: Canada
- Language: English

Proteus is an animated documentary film written and directed by David Lebrun in 2004. It depicts a 19th-century understanding of the sea by interweaving the life and work of German biologist and researcher Ernst Haeckel with excerpts from Samuel Taylor Coleridge's epic poem The Rime of the Ancient Mariner, and the story of the oceanographic Challenger expedition of the 1870s.

One-celled microorganisms known as radiolarians feature prominently in Haeckel's fascination with the observable natural world and the underlying guiding principles assumed to be implicit in its very existence.
