= Mojtyny, Mrągowo County =

Mojtyny
- Village
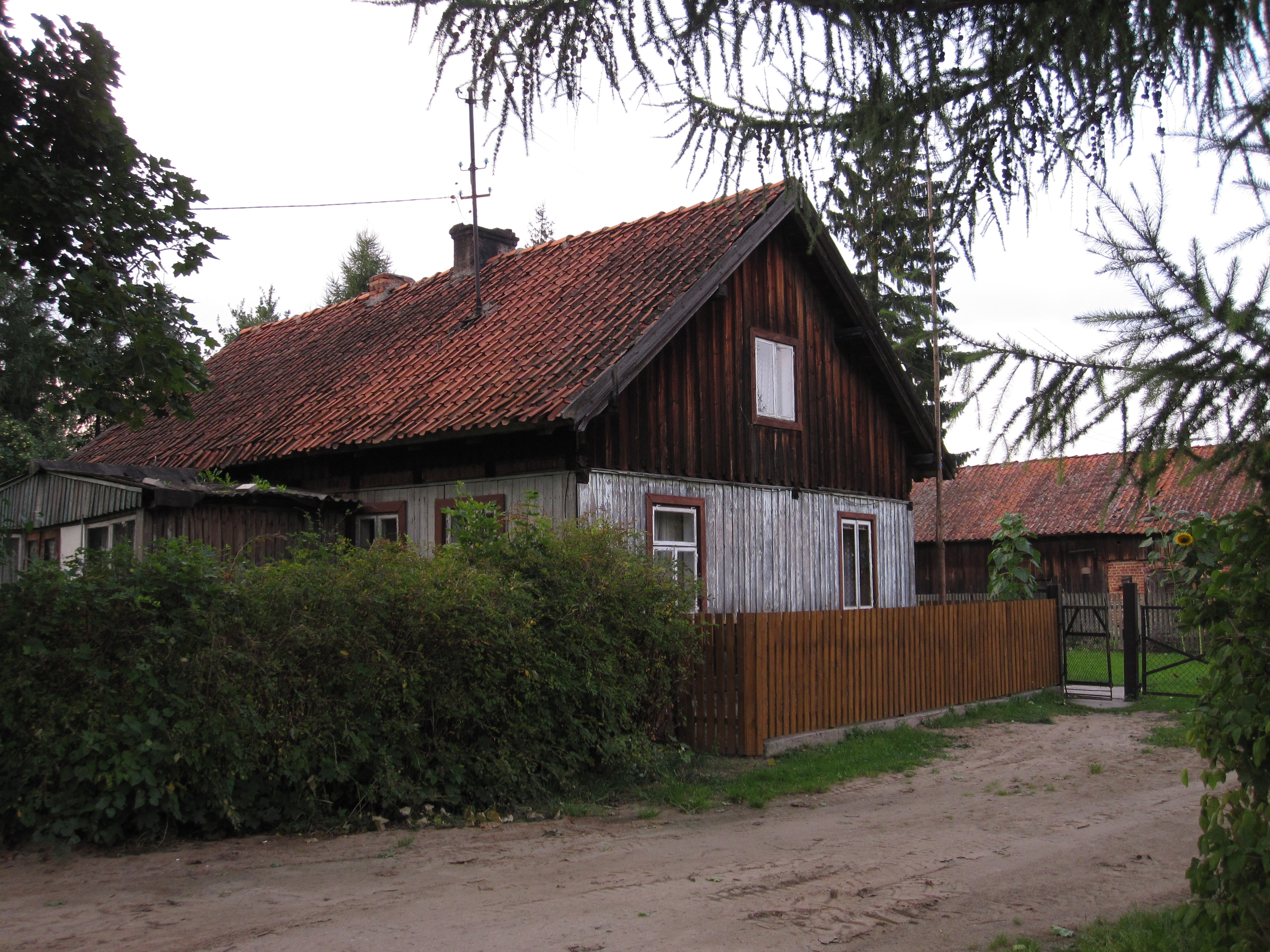

- Location within Poland
- Coordinates: 53°41′42″N 21°20′36″E
- Country: Poland
- Voivodeship: Warmian-Masurian
- County: Mrągowo
- Gmina: Piecki

Mojtyny [mɔi̯ˈtɨnɨ] (German Moythienen) is a village in the administrative district of Gmina Piecki, within Mrągowo County, Warmian-Masurian Voivodeship, in northern Poland.
