= Goleń, Warmian-Masurian Voivodeship =

Goleń
- Village
- Location within Poland
- Coordinates: 53°44′N 21°17′E
- Country: Poland
- Voivodeship: Warmian-Masurian
- County: Mrągowo
- Gmina: Piecki

Goleń [ˈɡɔlɛɲ] is a village in the administrative district of Gmina Piecki, within Mrągowo County, Warmian-Masurian Voivodeship, in northern Poland.
