= The Hindenburg (film) =

1975 American film directed by Robert Wise

- Original theatrical poster by George Akimoto
- Directed by: Robert Wise
- Written by: Nelson Gidding
- Story by: Richard Levinson; William Link
- Based on: The Hindenburg by Michael M. Mooney
- Produced by: Robert Wise
- Starring: George C. Scott; Anne Bancroft; William Atherton; Roy Thinnes; Gig Young; Burgess Meredith; Charles Durning; Richard A. Dysart
- Cinematography: Robert Surtees
- Edited by: Donn Cambern
- Music by: David Shire
- Distributed by: Universal Pictures
- Release date: December 25, 1975
- Running time: 125 minutes
- Country: United States
- Language: English
- Budget: $15 million
- Box office: $27.9 million

The Hindenburg is a 1975 American Technicolor disaster film based on the 1937 Hindenburg disaster. The film stars George C. Scott, Anne Bancroft and William Atherton and was produced and directed by Robert Wise. The screenplay was by Nelson Gidding, Richard Levinson and William Link, based on the 1972 book of the same name by Michael M. Mooney.

A highly speculative thriller, the film and the book on which it is based depict a conspiracy involving sabotage, which leads to the destruction of the German airship Hindenburg. In reality, while the Zeppelins were certainly used as propaganda symbols by Nazi Germany, and anti-Nazi forces may have been motivated to sabotage them, the possibility of such an act was investigated at the time; ultimately, no firm evidence was uncovered to substantiate the theory. (Note: The possibility of Boerth's (i.e. Spehl's) deliberate sabotage was one theory about the cause of the fire, and had been the subject of Mooney's book, which was published around the time of the film's development. Such a thesis has never been definitively proven, with most airship experts tending to discredit it.) A. A. Hoehling, author of the 1962 book Who Destroyed the Hindenburg?, also about the sabotage theory, sued Mooney along with the film developers for copyright infringement as well as unfair competition. However, Judge Charles M. Metzner dismissed his allegations.

Filmed largely in color (with a mock newsreel presented in black-and-white at the beginning of the film), a portion of the film is presented in monochrome, edited between portions of the historical Hindenburg newsreel footage shot on May 6, 1937.

== Plot ==
In April 1937 Kathie Rauch from Milwaukee, Wisconsin sends a letter to the German Embassy in Washington, D.C., claiming the German zeppelin Hindenburg will explode while flying over New York City during its first flight of the season. In the meantime, Luftwaffe Colonel Franz Ritter has been named the security officer to protect the Hindenburg as various threats have been made to sabotage the airship, which some see as a symbol of Nazi Germany.

Ritter is assisted by a Nazi government official, SS/Gestapo Hauptsturmführer Martin Vogel, who poses as the "official photographer" aboard the Hindenburg. However, both operate independently in investigating the background of all passengers and crew on the voyage. Ritter has reason to suspect everyone, even his old friend, Countess Ursula von Reugen, whose Baltic estate in Peenemünde had been taken over by the Nazis for weapons testing and appears to be escaping Germany while visiting her young hearing-impaired daughter in Boston.

Other prime suspects include Edward Douglas, a suspicious German-American advertising executive, card sharps Emilio Pajetta and Major Napier, as well as several crew members and even the Hindenburg captains Max Pruss and Ernst Lehmann. Many possible clues turn out to be red herrings, such as Joe Spah sketching the ship's interior as an idea for a vaudeville show and mysterious names which later turned out to be the name of race horses two of the passengers are making bets on. Two other code names, for carnivorous air and sea animals, turn out to refer to the Hindenburg itself and the Queen Mary, where Douglas's competitor is in a race to beat him to port to secure a business deal in New York.

As the Hindenburg continues to Lakehurst Naval Air Station, events conspire against Ritter and Vogel. Although Rauch turns out to be a self-proclaimed clairvoyant upon investigation by the FBI, they soon suspect crewman Karl Boerth, a former Hitler Youth leader who has become disillusioned with the Nazi regime. Ritter attempts to arrest Boerth but he resists and requests help from Ritter, who sympathizes with him because Ritter's son was killed in an accident the previous year while in the Hitler Youth. Ritter later receives news that Boerth's girlfriend, Freda Halle, was killed while trying to escape the Gestapo, who had arrested her for questioning after she was seen asking too many pointed questions about the ship's exact position and arrival time at Lakehurst. Boerth, upon hearing the news of Halle's death, plans to commit suicide by staying aboard the airship as the bomb goes off, to show that there is a resistance against the Nazi regime. Ritter reluctantly agrees with Boerth to set the bomb to 7:30, when the airship should have landed and passengers disembarked, Boerth insisting an explosion which kills passengers is the "last thing he wants".

While setting up the bomb, Boerth drops his knife which is recovered by a crew member. To cover up the loss of the knife, Boerth steals a knife from fellow crewman, Ludwig Knorr. Vogel starts to work behind Ritter's back, arresting Boerth and confiscating the Countess's passport.

As the airship approaches Lakehurst Naval Air Station, Ritter, now realizing the landing will be delayed, frantically searches for Boerth to find out where the bomb is hidden. Ritter discovers Vogel in the cargo hold torturing Boerth; Ritter fights with Vogel, knocking him unconscious. An injured Boerth tells Ritter the bomb is in the repair patch of gas cell 4. Ritter attempts to defuse the bomb, but is distracted by Vogel, who has regained consciousness. Unable to disarm the bomb, it detonates, killing Ritter instantly, and sending Vogel flying down the catwalk. Vogel survives the fall but is badly burned by the inferno and is later carried off by ground crewmen after emerging from the wreckage. Boerth, injured from being tortured by Vogel, dies of burns, but manages to set the Channing's Dalmatian dog free after the airship crashes to the ground. The Countess survives and is reunited with her daughter.

The following day, while newsreel footage of the wreckage is shown, a narrator lists some of the survivors and casualties of the disaster, as well as some of the possible theories. The wreckage is examined for the inquiry before being cleaned up. As Herbert Morrison's memorable radio commentary is played, the Hindenburg is seen flying and disappears into the clouds as the credits roll.

== Characters ==
- Colonel Franz Ritter — A Luftwaffe Colonel assigned by Joseph Goebbels to board the Hindenburg as a security officer in response to the bomb threat. Ritter won the Knight's Cross as the chief of intelligence during the Bombing of Guernica. His son Alfred was in the Hitler Youth and died the previous year falling from a synagogue after vandalizing it with slogans. In early versions of the screenplay, the character was known as "Fritz Kessler." Ritter is based upon Colonel Fritz Erdmann who was aboard the final flight, though there is no evidence that he nor the other two Luftwaffe officers were aboard as a security officer to investigate a bomb threat.
- Ursula von Reugen — Ursula is a Baltic German countess and old friend of Ritter, who lived in her estate in Peenemünde. After it had been taken over by the Nazis, she boards the Hindenburg to fly to America. She previously became acquainted to Ritter through her deceased husband who was in the same flying club with him; she went to live on her estate after he died in a plane crash. Her young daughter, Trudi, is deaf and goes to a school in Boston, living with her friends.
- Karl Boerth — A rigger, and the saboteur of the airship. Boerth was a former Hitler Youth leader, but claims he became inactive because he helped build the Hindenburg. His girlfriend, Freda Halle, worked with foreigners in a French bank in Frankfurt, and her ex-lover was killed fighting for the Republicans in the Spanish Civil War, leading the Gestapo to investigate.
- SS/Gestapo Hauptsturmführer Martin Vogel — The antagonist of the film. Vogel is an undercover Gestapo agent posing as the official photographer for the airship. Initially, Vogel works cooperatively with Ritter, but after Ritter dismisses the suspicious behavior of some of the passengers and has apparent sympathies for Boerth and the Countess, Vogel begins to work behind Ritter's back. He also has a romantic interest in a young American passenger, Valerie Breslau, referring to her as a "Jewish model." Vogel is loosely based on Karl Otto Clemens, who was a semi-official photographer for the Deutsche Zeppelin Reederei (a passenger list shown in the film lists him as "Otto Vogel") as well as Luftwaffe Major Hans-Hugo Witt, but there is no evidence that either Clemens or Witt were connected with the Gestapo.
- Rigger Ludecke — A rigger who also works for the Gestapo, helping Vogel catch Boerth.
- Captain Max Pruss — The ship's commander. Unlike the real Pruss, he acts dismissively towards safety concerns voiced by Ernst Lehmann. In fact, the real Pruss may have been under Lehmann's pressure to rush the landing of the airship.
- Captain Ernst Lehmann — Senior observer who has been a zeppelin captain since before World War 1. He is on the flight at the request of Ritter, and also to appeal to the United States Congress to supply Germany with helium for their airships. He is portrayed as being wary of the Nazis, more conscious of the ship's safety than Pruss and on good terms with Dr. Eckener. In actuality, the real Lehmann was well known as a Nazi supporter (or at least pretended to be) in order to advance his career and the fortunes of the Zeppelin Company. However, in 1929 Lehmann filed a declaration of intent to become a United States citizen, but changed his mind when he was given charge of the Hindenburg in 1936. In the film Lehmann mentions reluctantly dropping leaflets from the Hindenburg during a propaganda flight. In reality, Lehmann was eager to oblige the Nazis

in this undertaking, to the extent that he attempted to launch the airship in unfavorable wind conditions, resulting in damage to the lower fin. Infuriated, Hugo Eckener, Lehmann's superior in the Zeppelin Company, angrily berated him for endangering the Hindenburg to appease the Nazis, resulting in Propaganda Minister Goebbels blacklisting Eckener in the press, despite his being honored as a hero both in Germany and abroad.

- Reed & Bess Channing — Broadway show promoters and composers, who also own a Dalmatian named Heidi. They took the Hindenburg because Mrs. Channing was pregnant for the first time and did not want to risk the turbulent seas on the RMS Queen Mary. Reed Channing and Joe Späh perform a concert for the passengers, satirizing the Nazi regime, which offends Captain Pruss who abruptly leaves. The Channings are very loosely based upon the Adelts, journalists who were closely affiliated with the Zeppelin Company. In reality, German acrobat Joseph Späh owned a dog, a German Shepherd named Ulla. There was also another dog aboard. The dog in the film survives the disaster. Neither of the two dogs aboard the last flight actually survived, and there was no passenger on board the last flight who was known to be pregnant.
- The Breslaus — A family of German-Americans, consisting of Albert and Mildred Breslau and their three children Valerie, Peter, and Paul. Albert Breslau was to sell some diamonds hidden in a pen to get funding for his grandmother's family, the Milsteins, out of Germany because they were Jewish. Breslau refused to do this but the pen was given by a Zeppelin staff member to Valerie Breslau before the flight. The family is based upon the Herman Doehner family that was aboard on the last flight (though the Doehners were not Jewish, and while Mrs. Breslau and all three Breslau children survive in the film, Mr. Doehner died in the crash and his daughter Irene died later of burns).
- Joseph Späh — A German-American Vaudeville acrobat who comes under suspicion for making unaccompanied visits to see the Channings' dog and drawing detailed sketches of the ship's interior as an idea for a theatre show. The real Späh made unaccompanied visits into the hull to visit his own dog, and was accused of sabotaging the airship by some members of the Hindenburg crew.
- Edward Douglas — A German-American advertising executive who was a cryptographer during World War I. He uses that past experience, during his trip aboard the Hindenburg, to keep track of a rival ad executive sailing aboard the ocean liner Queen Mary. The first person to reach New York City wins a lucrative contract for their agency to handle the advertising for a soon-to-open German branch of General Motors, which has acquired Opel. Although Douglas was a real passenger aboard the Hindenburg on the last flight, this subplot is only mentioned in Mooney's book and has been dismissed as fictional by some airship historians. In addition, Opel was completely acquired by General Motors by 1931.
- Hugo Eckener — Renowned airship commander and head of the Zeppelin Company, known to be hostile to the Nazi regime. In the film, he claims to have refused to name the LZ129 after the Führer, but in reality, Hitler did not want the zeppelin named after him because he didn't like airships, considering them impractical and dangerous and didn't want his name attached to something that might be destroyed.
- Captain Fellows — The U.S. Navy commanding officer at the Lakehurst Naval Air Station, based on Commander Charles E. Rosendahl. He is assisted by Lieutenant Hank Truscott, who is based on Lieutenant George F. Watson.
- Bosun Hoban — The leader of the landing ground crew, based on Frederick "Bull" Tobin who was credited with coordinating rescue efforts for survivors immediately after the crash.

== Cast ==
Many of the fictional characters are based on actual people. For example: Franz Ritter is based on Fritz Erdmann, Karl Boerth is based on Eric Spehl.

Actor	Role
George C. Scott	Col. Franz Ritter
Anne Bancroft	Countess Ursula von Reugen
William Atherton	Karl Boerth
Roy Thinnes	Martin Vogel
Gig Young	Edward Douglas*
David Mauro	Joseph Goebbels*
Burgess Meredith	Emilio Pajetta
Rolfe Sedan	Ambassador Hans Luther*
Charles Durning	Capt. Max Pruss*
Richard Dysart	Capt. Ernst Lehmann*
Robert Clary	Joe Späh*
René Auberjonois	Maj. Napier
Peter Donat	Reed Channing
Ted Gehring	Ludwig Knorr*
Alan Oppenheimer	Albert Breslau
Katherine Helmond	Mildred Breslau
Jean Rasey	Valerie Breslau
Joanna Cook Moore	Bess Channing
Stephen Elliott	Capt. Fellows
Joyce Davis	Eleanore Ritter
Val Bisoglio	Lieutenant Lombardi
Colby Chester	Eliot Howell III
Michael Richardson	Rigger Neuhaus
Herbert Nelson	Hugo Eckener*
William Sylvester	Luftwaffe Colonel
Greg Mullavey	Herbert Morrison*
Scott Walker	Gestapo Major
Simon Scott	Luftwaffe General
Joe Turkel	Detective Moore
Sandy Ward	Detective Grunberger
Herbert Morrison	Himself (Voice, uncredited)

(*) Beside name indicates actual historical person

This was the second film released in 1975 to feature the actors William Atherton, Burgess Meredith and Richard Dysart after The Day of the Locust.

== Production notes ==
Director Robert Wise, known for an attention to detail and background research, began to collect documents and film footage on the real-life Hindenburg for over a year at the National Archives in London, the National Air and Space Museum Library and Archives in Washington, D.C. as well as in Germany. In 1974, while casting took place in United States, pre-production photography was undertaken in Munich (doubling for Frankfurt), Milwaukee, New York and Washington, D.C. Naval Air Station Lakehurst, New Jersey would also be a primary location. The Marine Corps Air Station Tustin near Santa Ana, where two 1,000 feet (300 m) airship hangars still existed, doubled for the original Hindenburg mooring station (MCAS Tustin officially was closed by BRAC action in 1999). Additional locations in Southern California were also chosen.

Wise had originally intended to shoot the entire film in black and white and not just the disaster sequence. When Universal objected, he and production designer Edward Carfagno incorporated black and dark colors in the sets to "give an impression of black-and-white in a color film."

Studio and special effects work was carried out at Sound Stage 12 in the Universal Studios complex. Wise's research was used to advantage, since the bulk of Zeppelin blueprints were destroyed in World War II. Using photographs, a recreated passenger area, gondola and superstructure of the giant airship was constructed to create a realistic exterior and interior set for the actors. A team of 80 artists and technicians working double shifts for four months, assembled a "giant Erector Set" consisting of eight tons of aluminum, 11,000 yards (10,000 m) of muslin, 24,000 feet (7,300 m) of sash cord and 2,000,000 rivets.

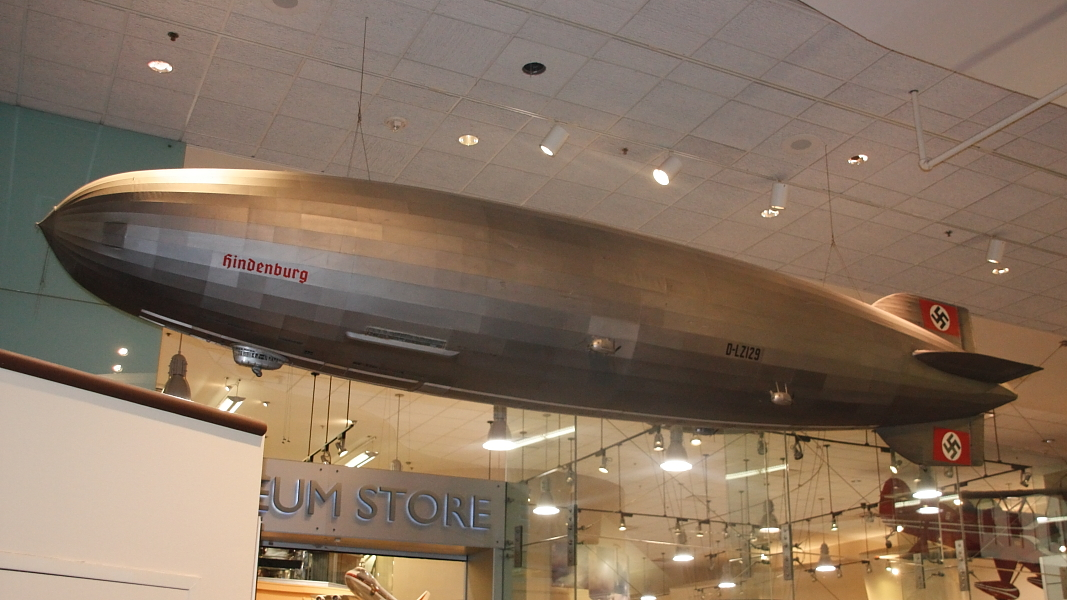
The model of the Hindenburg used in the film, displayed in the National Air and Space Museum

The Hindenburg made extensive use of matte paintings to bring the Zeppelin to life. A highly detailed 25-foot-long (7.6 m) model of the airship was "flown" via an elaborate setup where the stationary model was photographed by a mobile platform consisting of a camera and dolly on a track on Universal Studios' largest and tallest sound stage, Stage 12. For the scene where water ballast is released from the nose of the airship, a matte painting was used, and sugar was dropped through a hole in the windows as water. To recreate the initial explosion of the airship, which was missed by the newsreel cameras, matte paintings and animation were used to make a superimposed explosion of the airship beside its mooring mast. The model of the Hindenburg was hung on display at the National Air and Space Museum in Washington, D.C. along with the gondola as part of its Balloons and Airships gallery. (photo at right). When the gallery closed in 1990, the model was relocated to the outside of the museum's gift shop, while the gondola was sold to NAS Lakehurst. In 2022, the Hindenburg model was moved a second time to the Steven F. Udvar-Hazy Center following the Smithsonian's renovation.

A tragedy nearly happened during the filming of the Hindenburg's fiery demise. A full-scale section of the Zeppelin's nose was built for the film on Universal Studios' Stage 12, and was set to be destroyed by fire for the film's final destruction sequence. A half-dozen stunt artists wearing fire-retardant gear were placed in the nose replica as it was set afire; however, the fire quickly got out of control, causing several stunt artists to get lost in the smoke, damaging several cameras filming the action, and nearly destroying the sound stage. Only 4 seconds of footage from this sequence appears in the final cut of the film; the entire sequence, as it had been planned, was not included.

The Hindenburg was one of only two theatrical films to be written by television screenwriting duo Richard Levinson and William Link, the other being 1977's Rollercoaster.

=== Newsreel footage ===
An interesting aspect was the film's transition from black and white to technicolor and back to grayscale, beginning with a simulated Universal Newsreel that gave a brief history of lighter-than-air craft. While a narrator talks about the LZ 127 Graf Zeppelin, footage of the LZ 130 Graf Zeppelin II being christened in 1938 is erroneously shown, indicating the newsreel was not from 1936. This ends with images of the Hindenburg's construction, immediately transitioning to a color matte painting of the Hindenburg shown outside its hangar, and along with the opening credits the airship flies by before disappearing into the clouds.

== Historical accuracy ==
Although the film is largely accurate to its setting, there were numerous differences between the film and reality. Some aspects were added for dramatic purposes. The scene when the fabric rips on the port fin did not happen to the Hindenburg, but a similar event occurred on the Graf Zeppelin during its maiden flight to the United States in 1928. Additionally, although the Hindenburg did have a specially constructed aluminum Blüthner baby grand piano aboard for the 1936 season, it was not aboard the final flight in 1937. While the interior of the ship was accurately recreated utilizing original blueprints and photographs, a stairway was added to the interior of the lower fin for dramatic purposes; in the real Hindenburg, access to the fin was provided by a ladder which dropped from the inside of the ship for crew members to use. Several aspects of the airship's takeoff and landing procedures were also inaccurate.

The zeppelin hangar seen when the Hindenburg departs Germany for the United States was actually one of two World War II US Navy blimp hangars located at Tustin, California, the architecture of which is quite different from the actual German zeppelin hangars (the same Tustin hangar is also used in the scenes at Lakehurst; two similar blimp hangars were constructed at Lakehurst in 1943, but did not exist in 1937).

The mooring mast used in the landing sequence is black, while the real mooring mast was red and white. During the landing sequence the ship drops water ballast through windows near the nose instead of at the tail section, as it did during the final approach.

A few anachronisms occur as well: At the beginning of the story, two senior Luftwaffe Generals discuss the possibility of Colonel Franz Ritter receiving the Knight's Cross of the Iron Cross for actions in the Spanish Civil War. The Knight's Cross did not exist in 1937 (when the film is set), first being created at the start of World War II in 1939.

Also, at one point, Edward Douglas refers to the fact that the German car manufacturer Opel is to be taken over by General Motors "the next day." In fact, Opel had been taken over completely by General Motors during the Great Depression in 1931, six years previously. When Col. Ritter empties the fountain pen in the sink, it is clearly a modern stainless steel design with modern taps. At Berlin, there are French Citroën HY delivery vans which were built in the late 1940s. And Ursula is seen reading a paperback version of Gone With The Wind, which did not exist in paperback form in 1937.

Several dramatic escapes depicted were based on fact, slightly altered for dramatic purposes, including:

- Werner Franz, a 14-year-old cabin boy, escaped the flames after a water ballast tank overhead burst open and soaked him with water. He then made his way to the hatch and turned around and ran the other way, because the flames were being pushed by the wind toward the starboard side. In the film, however, he is depicted being doused by the water after he jumped out.
- Passenger Joseph Späh, a circus performer, escaped by smashing a window with his home movie camera (the film survived the disaster), and held on to the side of the window, jumping to the ground when the ship was low enough, surviving with only a broken ankle. In the film he is depicted grabbing a mooring rope, but in reality there was no rope.
- Ursula survives the fire by walking down a stairway, similar to the real life escape of Margaret Mather. However, Mather escaped this way only after the ship had crashed to the ground.
- Ernst Lehmann is portrayed in the film walking out of the burning wreckage seemingly unharmed until he falls forward dying, revealing his badly burnt back. Although the real Lehmann walked out of the wreckage in a similar manner, he died the morning following the crash in hospital from severe burns on his back.
- In the film, Radio Officer Willy Speck is seen jumping to his death from a high altitude. In reality he was trapped in the control car when the ship fell, and later died of his injuries.

== Reception ==
Although well received by the public as typical "disaster movie" fare, critical reception of The Hindenburg was generally unfavorable. Roger Ebert's one-star review from the Chicago Sun-Times dismissed it as a failed project, writing: "The Hindenburg is a disaster picture, all right. How else can you describe a movie that cost $12 million and makes people laugh out loud at all the wrong times?" Vincent Canby of The New York Times described the film as "brainless" and "pricelessly funny at the wrong moments ... Yet I wouldn't have missed a single foolish frame of it. I sort of like disaster movies, even bad ones, for reasons that have to do with the special effects and with other things that probably go back to the prenatal state." Arthur D. Murphy of Variety wrote "Dull and formula scripting, a lack of real empathy and phoned-in acting shoot down some good though unspectacular special effects." Gene Siskel of the Chicago Tribune gave the film two stars out of four, faulting it for "really dumb dialog" and a "fake story" but finding it redeemed somewhat by "terrific" special effects and David Shire's music. He concluded, "As it stands, the only way to enjoy the film is to get in the mood for trash and to laugh a lot." Kevin Thomas of the Los Angeles Times wrote "Technically, the film is a triumph; dramaturgically, it is somewhat less than that. Its climax is terrifyingly, horrendously spectacular, but the two hours getting there are not as gripping as they might have been." Gary Arnold of The Washington Post wrote "The film has begun to drag by the time the climactic explosion occurs, and the climax itself is somewhat less than thrilling. Wise has tried to integrate the newsreel footage of the disaster with vignettes of the fictional characters inside attempting to escape, but there's an impossible esthetic gulf between the documentary and staged scenes." Pauline Kael voiced her disapproval of the film and Wise's direction with the phrase "One gasbag meets another." Similar reactions were recounted, and when the film eventually made it to television screens, the TV Guide summed up a near-universal review: "This insipid, boring, implausible, senseless, deliciously funny, and expensively mounted film... There's no tension whatsoever and none of the characters is remotely interesting, let alone sympathetic."

On Rotten Tomatoes, the film holds a score of 31% based on 16 reviews.

The Hindenburg opened on Christmas Day 1975 (Thursday) and in its opening four-day weekend (Thursday to Sunday) grossed $3,729,907 from 289 theatres in the United States.

== Awards ==
The Hindenburg was noted for its use of special effects and won two Special Achievement Academy Awards in 1976:

- Peter Berkos for Sound Effects Editing
- Albert Whitlock and Glen Robinson for Visual Effects

The film was also nominated for Best Art Direction (Art Direction: Edward Carfagno; Set Decoration: Frank R. McKelvy), Best Cinematography and Best Sound (Leonard Peterson, John A. Bolger Jr., John L. Mack and Don Sharpless).

In the same year, The Hindenburg was nominated for an "Eddie" in the category of Best Edited Feature Film in the American Cinema Editors Awards.

== Home media ==
The Hindenburg has been released on a number of home video formats, including VHS, Betamax, CED Video Disc, Laser Disc, and DVD. On February 7, 2017, the film was released on Blu-ray in a bare bones edition as a Wal-Mart exclusive, and a wide release followed on May 2, 2017.

== See also ==
- List of American films of 1975
