= John L. Mack =

American sound engineer

- Born: John Lawrence Mack; August 12, 1927
- Died: December 24, 2021 (aged 94)
- Occupation: Sound engineer
- Years active: 1956–1993

John Lawrence Mack (August 12, 1927 – December 24, 2021) was an American sound engineer. He was nominated for an Academy Award in the category Best Sound for the film The Hindenburg.

In addition to his Academy Award nomination, he was nominated for two Primetime Emmy Awards in the category Outstanding Sound Mixing for his work on the television program The Wonder Years.

== Selected filmography ==
- The Hindenburg (1975; co-nominated with Leonard Peterson, John A. Bolger Jr. and Don Sharpless)
