= Don Sharpless =

American sound engineer

- Born: January 8, 1933
- Died: August 2, 2017 (aged 84)
- Occupation: Sound engineer
- Years active: 1970–1987

Don Sharpless (January 8, 1933 – August 2, 2017) was an American sound engineer. He was nominated for an Academy Award in the category Best Sound for the film The Hindenburg. Sharpless was also nominated for an Primetime Emmy Award in the category Outstanding Sound Mixing for his work on the television program Fame.

== Selected filmography ==
- The Hindenburg (1975; co-nominated with Leonard Peterson, John A. Bolger Jr. and John L. Mack)
