= Leonard Peterson (sound engineer) =

American sound engineer

- Born: Leonard S. Peterson
- Occupation: Sound engineer
- Years active: 1975–1992

Leonard S. Peterson is an American sound engineer. He was nominated for an Academy Award in the category Best Sound for the film The Hindenburg.

In addition to his Academy Award nomination, he was nominated for a Primetime Emmy Award in the category Outstanding Sound Mixing for his work on the television program Roots. His nomination was shared with Willie D. Burton, Robert Litt and Bill Varney.

== Selected filmography ==
- The Hindenburg (1975; co-nominated with John A. Bolger Jr., John L. Mack and Don Sharpless)
