= Babięta =

- Village
- Location within Poland
- Coordinates: 53°41′N 21°16′E
- Country: Poland
- Voivodeship: Warmian-Masurian
- County: Mrągowo
- Gmina: Piecki

Babięta [baˈbjɛnta] is a village in the administrative district of Gmina Piecki, within Mrągowo County, Warmian-Masurian Voivodeship, in northern Poland.

== Notable residents ==
- Herbert Abratis (1918–1945), Wehrmacht officer
