= Stare Kiełbonki =

- Village
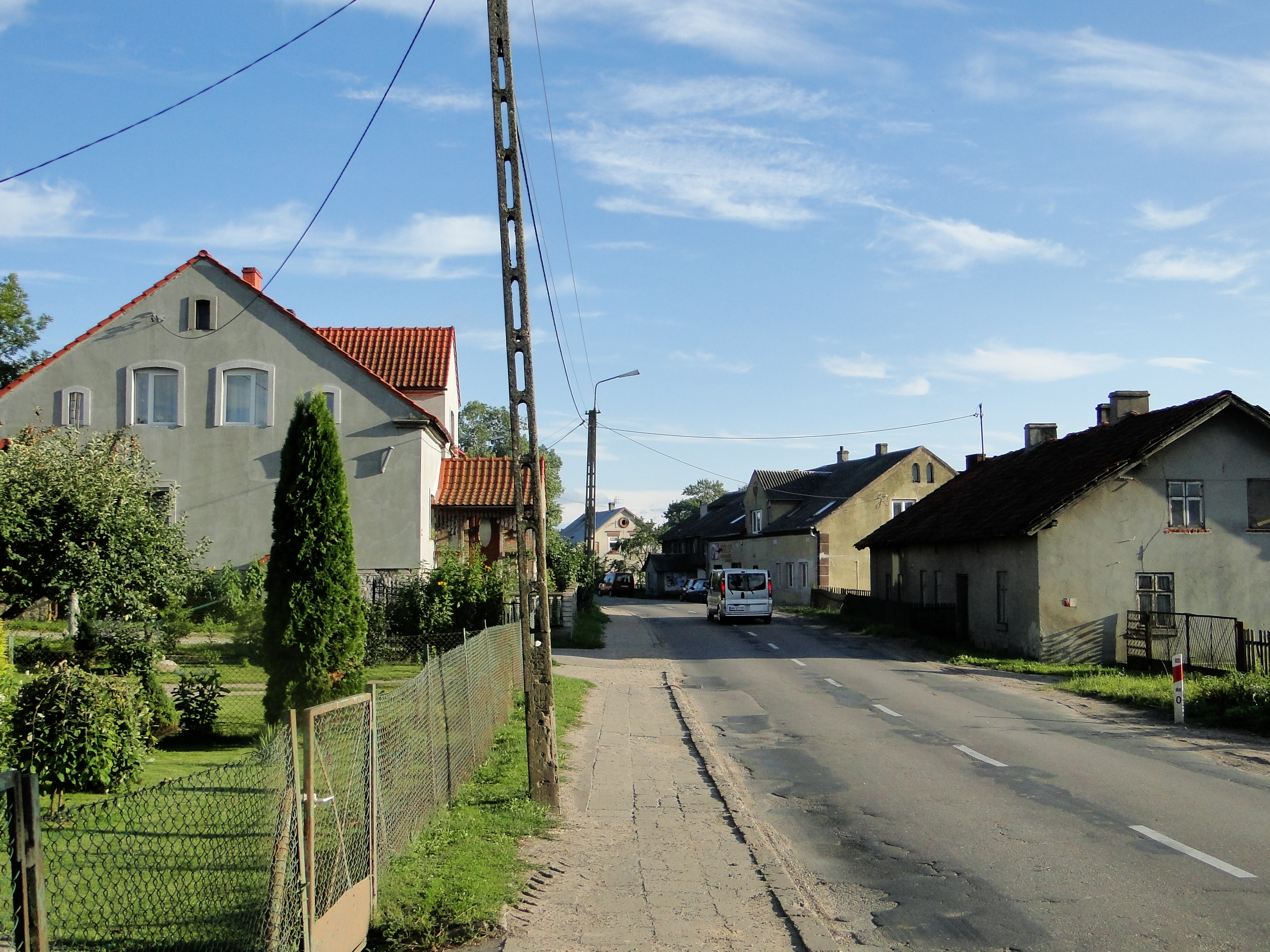

- Location within Poland
- Coordinates: 53°40′N 21°20′E
- Country: Poland
- Voivodeship: Warmian-Masurian
- County: Mrągowo
- Gmina: Piecki

Stare Kiełbonki [ˈstarɛ kʲɛu̯ˈbɔnki] is a village in the administrative district of Gmina Piecki, within Mrągowo County, Warmian-Masurian Voivodeship, in northern Poland.
