= Barry J. Spinello =

- Born: January 17, 1941 (age 85); Brooklyn, US
- Occupations: Film producer, director, Animator
- Known for: Experimental animation, portrait documentaries, scripting
- Notable work: Sonata for Pen Brush and Ruler, Soundtrack, & A Day in the Life of Bonnie Consolo

Barry J. Spinello (born January 17, 1941 in Brooklyn, New York City) is an American film director, film producer, screenwriter, and film editor. He was nominated for an Academy Award in 1975.

== Biography ==
Barry J. Spinello, who attended Midwood High School and graduated from Columbia University, He spent two years in Florence to pursue painting. He shot his first film, Broken Soldiers, sponsored by the Church Council, using a camcorder. In 1968, during the Ann Arbor Film Festival, the Berkeley Film Society screened Spinello's short film, Sonata for Pen, Brush and Ruler, in the Wheeler Auditorium.

For the next fifteen years, Spinello produced award-winning documentaries and other films from his studio in Emeryville, California. Spinello received an Oscar nomination for his 1975 documentary short film A Day in the Life of Bonnie Consolo , which depicts the daily life of a woman without arms. However, the award went to Bert Salzman for his short drama Angel and Big Joe , which explores the inner conflict of a minor.

Spinello's film Mel on Wheels (1981) won the Ribbon Award at the American Film Festival and the Chris Plaque Award at the Columbus Film Festival.He was slated to write the screenplay for the film Adrian as well as the Gadget People in 1986, but this project was abandoned due to a lawsuit Spinello filed against Amblin Entertainment /General and subsequent arbitration. This experience was so negative for Spinello that he turned his back on Hollywood and avoided the film industry for many years.

The New Museum of Contemporary Art in New York keeps three early film images by Spinello in its collection for preservation purposes.

== Filmography ==
- 1968: Sonata for Pen, Brush and Ruler (short film; also producer, author and editor)
- 1969: Soundtrack (short film; also producer, author + editor)
- 1970: Six Loop Paintings (short film; also producer, writer + editor)
- 1972: Daily Routine in the Life of Dave Harvey (documentary; also producer, writer, editor + camera)
- 1973: Goatman of Briones (short film; also producer + editor)
- 1973: Film Graphics Abstract Aspects of Editing (documentary short film; also producer and author)
- 1974: Making Pottery (short film; also author)
- 1975: A Day in the Life of Bonnie Consolo (documentary short film; also producer)
- 1976: It's the Difference (documentary)
- 1977: Counseling the Terminally Ill: Three Lives (documentary; also producer and author)
- 1978: A Force of Five Thousand (documentary; also editor)
- 1979: Oxnard Robot (documentary short film; also editor)
- 1981: Mel on Wheels (documentary short film; also producer)
- 1983: Postcard from Paris (documentary; also producer)
- 1995: Peter Andrews Putnam (documentary short film; also producer, author, editor + camera)
- 2013: Towards (short film; also producer, writer + editor)

== Controversy ==
In 1994, Spinello sued Amblin Entertainment, over his script Adrian and the Toy People. He claimed that Amblin Entertainment's film "Small Soldiers" was based on his script "Adrian and the Toy People". He lost the case.

== Awards and recognition ==
In 1975, he was nominated for his film A Day in the Life of Bonnie Consolo in the category "Best Short Film".
