= Probes in Space =

1975 film

- Produced by: George Casey
- Production company: Graphic Films for the Reuben H. Fleet Space Theater
- Release date: 1975
- Country: United States
- Language: English

Probes in Space is a 1975 American short documentary film produced by George Casey. It was nominated for an Academy Award for Best Documentary Short.
