= Bert Salzman =

American screenwriter (1931–2016)

- Born: September 2, 1931; New York City, New York, U.S.
- Died: November 29, 2016 (aged 85); Sonoma, California, U.S.
- Occupations: Screenwriter, film director

Bert Salzman (September 2, 1931 – November 29, 2016) was an American writer and film director. He won the Academy Award for Best Live Action Short Film for directing Angel and Big Joe (1975).

== Early life ==
Bert Salzman was born on September 2, 1931, in New York City and grew up in an orphanage. He never completed high school and became self-educated. As a young boy, he became interested with painting. At the age of 17, he enlisted in the United States Marine Corps and fought in the Korean War.
