= Millions of Years Ahead of Man =

1975 film

- Produced by: Manfred Baier
- Release date: 1975
- Country: West Germany
- Language: German

Millions of Years Ahead of Man (German: Um Jahrmillionen voraus) is a 1975 West German short documentary film about Leafcutter ants, produced by Manfred Baier for BASF. The music is from Wolfgang Lauth. It was nominated for an Academy Award for Best Documentary Short.
