= John A. Bolger Jr. =

American sound engineer

- Born: May 22, 1908
- Died: August 22, 1990 (aged 82); Woodland Hills, California, U.S.
- Occupation: Sound engineer
- Years active: 1955-1975

John A. Bolger Jr. (May 22, 1908 – August 22, 1990) was an American sound engineer. He was nominated for an Academy Award in the category Best Sound for the film The Hindenburg.

== Selected filmography ==
- The Hindenburg (1975; co-nominated with Leonard Peterson, John L. Mack and Don Sharpless)
