= List of European tornadoes in 2026 =

List of tornadoes in Europe and surrounding regions in 2026

European tornadoes of 2026
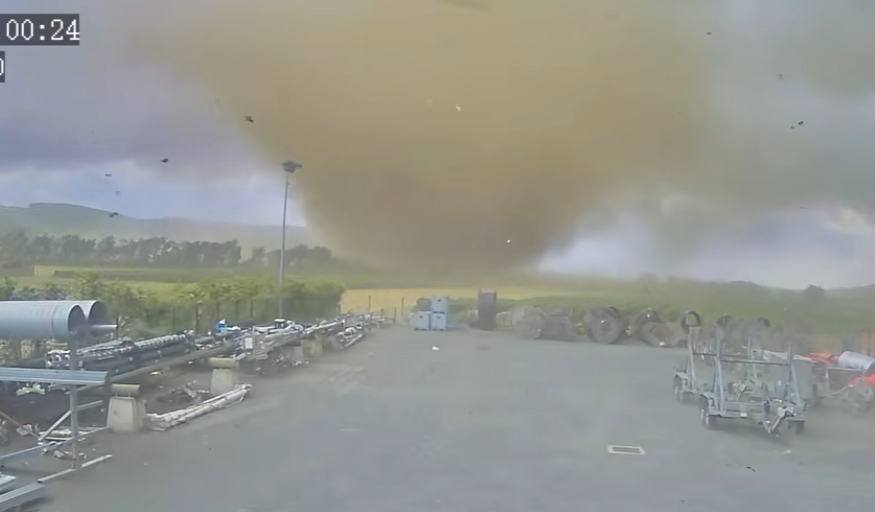
- An EF3/IF3 tornado near Pomas, France on 24 August
- Timespan: 4 January - Present
- Maximum rated tornado: IF3 tornado: Pomas, Occitania, France on August 24th; Marsala, Sicily, Italy on October 9th
- Tornadoes: 292
- Fatalities: 2 (111 injuries)

The 2026 European tornado season is the current season of tornadoes and tornado outbreaks across Europe in 2026. As of November, there have been 292 confirmed tornadoes across several countries, resulting in two fatalities and at least 111 injuries

IFU	IF0	IF0.5	IF1	IF1.5	IF2	IF2.5	IF3	IF4	IF5	Total
112	12	44	44	45	22	2	2	0	0	290

- Note: Some tornadoes have been rated using different scales. They are counted as their closest IF-Scale equivalent on this table
- Note: 10 tornadoes have been confirmed but have not been rated yet

Many different meteorological organizations across Europe document tornado events, often using different tornado intensity scales, including the TORRO (T) scale, the Fujita (F) scale, the Enhanced Fujita (EF) scale, and the International Fujita (IF) scale. For consistency, this list primarily uses the IF-scale, the preferred scale of the European Severe Storms Laboratory (ESSL) and its database, the European Severe Weather Database (ESWD).

== Climatology ==
Despite their similar areas, Europe sees significantly fewer tornadoes than the United States. Geography plays a major role in this discrepancy, with the unique features in North America making areas like Tornado Alley ideal for severe weather, while many of these conditions are generally less optimal in Europe. However, the under-reporting of weaker tornadoes across the continent also contributes to this. This under-reporting primarily stems from a lack of pan-European collaboration in monitoring tornadoes, resulting in less public and institutional awareness of them or their danger or the real threat they pose, despite many occurrences of violent, damaging, and deadly tornadoes across the continent.

Tornado activity in Europe typically peaks in the summer months and is lowest during the winter months. More specifically, Central and Northern Europe peak in the summer, the western and central Mediterranean regions peak in autumn, and the eastern Mediterranean region peaks in the winter. Tornadoes over land most often occur in the late afternoon and early evening hours. On the other hand, waterspouts, which sometimes move ashore in coastal areas and become tornadoes, peak in late spring and typically occur earlier in the day

== Season summary ==
- Note: Unrated tornadoes are counted as IFU on the graphs

January was somewhat inactive, with only 11 confirmed tornadoes, with 3 of them being IF2 rated. The first half of the week was relatively inactive, with one IF2 striking Kalpaki, Greece. The later half of the month was much more active, with a handful of IF1.5's and 2 IF2 rated tornadoes striking Spain and France.

February was average overall, but starting on February 18th, an extremely unusual three-week period with no tornadoes reported occurred due to persistent ridging across southern Europe and record-breaking warm and dry conditions. These conditions continued into March, which ended as a very inactive month with fewer tornadoes reported than in February. An early-season tornado occurred in Romania and was rated IF1.5.

March and April combined were very inactive months, with March having 6 reported tornadoes, with 2 of them being rated IF1.5, and April having 4 reported tornadoes, most of them being IFU rated, with one IF0.5 occurring.

May was the second most active month of the year, with 40 reported tornadoes. Only one IF2 occurred, meanwhile many other occurred in an area nearby Europe, with multiple strong tornadoes including one violent IF4 that struck 2 countries close to Europe. Most of the tornadoes that occurred in May were overall rated IFU.

June was somewhat active, with 37 reported tornadoes, and 2 IF2 tornadoes striking Lithuania and Italy. The first half of the month was very active for mainly Eastern Europe, with a small tornado outbreak occurring in Lithuania, with 1 IF1.5 and IF2, one of which struck a large populated city area, and an IF1.5 rated tornado near the border in North Rhine-Westphalia as it crossed the border into Germany. The later half of the month was relatively inactive, with only one IF2 tornado striking Mantua, Italy on June 29th.

July was very inactive, with only 3 IF2's striking Italy and Germany, and overall only 26 tornadoes. An IF2 struck Bagnatica in Italy, and later on an outbreak of 3 tornadoes occurred in Germany, with one striking Groß Offenseth-Aspern, being rated IF2. This month was overall incredibly inactive compared to other months, but still had more tornadoes than February and March. To end the season off, a tornado in northern Fülesd in Hungary was rated IF1.5.

July was active, with 26 overall tornadoes, 3 of them being rated IF2. The first half of the month was somewhat active, with 10 of the 26 tornadoes occurring, with one IF2 which struck Bagnatica, Italy. The later half of the month was more active than the first, with 16 of the 26 tornadoes occurring, 2 of which were rated IF2. A coastal landspout rated IF2 struck Ancona, Italy, and a small tornado outbreak on June 26th produced an IF2 tornado in Groß Offenseth-Aspern, Germany and an IF1.5 in Glückstadt, Germany. To end the season off, 2 IF1.5 rated tornadoes struck Fülesd, Hungary and Tärendö, Sweden.

August was the most active month overall, with 71 reported tornadoes. The first half of the month was somewhat inactive, with 3 of the 71 tornadoes occurring, with 2 of them being IF1.5 rated. A small tornado outbreak on August 1st occurred, with an IF1.5 striking multiple areas in northwestern Vilnius. Another IF1.5 tornado struck Svir, Belarus, which ended up only being discovered 3 days later after damages were found by a storm spotter. The later half of the month was very active, with 68 of the 71 tornadoes occurring, 6 of them being IF2 rated, 2 of them being IF2.5 rated, and one being IF3 rated. From August 19th to the 21st, a large tornado outbreak occurred in Western Europe and certain Eastern European countries. An IF2.5 struck Büllingen, Belgium after a somewhat weak start to the tornado outbreak. Later on, 4 IF1.5 rated tornadoes occurred in a row before an IF2 rated tornado struck Braunfels, Germany. A few hours later, 3 IF2 rated tornadoes struck the region of Hessen, Germany, before an IF2.5 along with a satellite tornado rated IF1 struck Tambach-Dietharz and Ohrdruf, Germany. The IF2.5 was previously rated an IF3 until September 2026. The tornadoes after August 19th were then very weak, with the only exceptions being 2 IF1.5 rated tornadoes which had struck Kobdilj, Slovenia and Polomia, Poland. On August 24th, a large IF3/EF3 rated tornado struck areas near Carcassonne, France, which ended up taking the place of the strongest tornado in Europe during this time.

September was somewhat inactive, with 17 reported tornadoes, one of which was rated IF2. A back-to-school small tornado outbreak occurred in Lithuania and Belarus, both of the tornadoes which occurred were rated IFU. A rain-wrapped IF2 tornado struck an area near Poznan, Poland, which gave a child a concussion. Another tornado outbreak around Lithuania and Italy occurred, with 5 tornadoes occurring, and one IF1.5. 2 early day IF1 rated tornadoes struck Veiviržėnai and Gruzdžiai, Lithuania. Later on, an IF1.5 rated tornado struck Sinalunga, Italy, which had took the live of an 82 year old woman. The month later on was very inactive, with only a few other tornadoes occurring before the month had ended.

October was inactive, with only 12 tornadoes. An IF1.5 had struck Montpelier, France as part of a strong tornado outbreak from October 7th to the 9th. On the 8th, 2 tornadoes struck the Toscana region of Italy, and the next day a large, dusty, intense IF3 rated tornado struck Marsala and Petrosino, Sicily, which had injured 32 and killed a husband after the tornado struck the husbands car while her wife was also inside. This was the only intense tornado of the outbreak. On October 24th, an IF1.5 rated tornado struck Peschici, Italy.

== January ==
IFU	IF0	IF0.5	IF1	IF1.5	IF2	IF2.5	IF3	IF4	IF5	Total
4	0	1	0	3	3	0	0	0	0	11

=== 4 January event ===
List of confirmed tornadoes – Sunday, 4 January 2026 (Note: All dates are based on the local time zone where the tornado touched down; however, all times are in Coordinated Universal Time for consistency.)
IF#	Location	Region	Country	Start coord.	Time (UTC)	Path length	Max. width
IF1.5	Frattocchie	Lazio	Italy	41.7678°N 12.6151°E	10:18	4.7 km (2.9 mi)	70 m (77 yd)
IF1.5	A tornado downed multiple trees and a large tent. Several roofs were damaged, one of which was partially torn off its building.						

=== 5 January event ===
List of confirmed tornadoes – Monday, 5 January 2026
IF#	Location	Region	Country	Start coord.	Time (UTC)	Path length	Max. width
IFU	Rome	Lazio	Italy	41.4561°N 12.674°E	11:40	Unknown	Unknown
IFU	A waterspout likely made landfall but no damage was reported.						

=== 7 January event ===
List of confirmed tornadoes – Wednesday, 7 January 2026
IF#	Location	Region	Country	Start coord.	Time (UTC)	Path length	Max. width
IF2	Kalpaki	Epirus	Greece	39.8856°N 20.6261°E	16:30	Unknown	Unknown
IF2	A strong tornado destroyed a poultry farm, killing tens of thousands of chickens. The tornado also significantly damaged two other buildings, both of which had partially collapsed walls. A church, watchtowers and other structures were also damaged.						

=== 8 January event ===
List of confirmed tornadoes – Thursday, 8 January 2026
IF#	Location	Region	Country	Start coord.	Time (UTC)	Path length	Max. width
IF1.5	Giannitsochori	Western Greece	Greece	37.3931°N 21.6881°E	05:20	Unknown	Unknown
IF1.5	This tornado overturned a car and damaged greenhouses.						

=== 9 January event ===
List of confirmed tornadoes – Friday, 9 January 2026
IF#	Location	Region	Country	Start coord.	Time (UTC)	Path length	Max. width
IFU	Hrvatska	Rivanj	Croatia	44.1530°N 15.0231°E	16:00	Unknown	Unknown
IFU	A waterspout formed over the sea before quickly dissipating, causing no damage.						
IFU	Hrvatska	Petrcane	Croatia	44.1587°N 15.1246°E	16:12-16:13	Unknown	Unknown
IFU	A waterspout formed over the sea before quickly dissipating, causing no damage.						

=== 12 January event ===
List of confirmed tornadoes – Monday, 12 January 2026
IF#	Location	Region	Country	Start coord.	Time (UTC)	Path length	Max. width
IF0.5	Eboli	Campania	Italy	40.4941°N 14.9398°E	14:40	Unknown	Unknown
IF0.5	A waterspout moved ashore, uprooting trees and snapping large tree branches.						

=== 25 January event ===
List of confirmed tornadoes – Sunday, 25 January 2026
IF#	Location	Region	Country	Start coord.	Time (UTC)	Path length	Max. width
IF1.5	Riocaud	Nouvelle-Aquitaine	France	44.7649°N 0.2076°E	13:54	11 km (6.8 mi)	Unknown
IF1.5	A tornado touched down in the village of Riocaud and quickly caused significant structural damage, most notably ripping the roof off a church and damaging nearby buildings as debris was scattered through the area. As it moved along its path, additional homes and structures sustained roof damage, with some buildings partially opened or damaged by flying debris, while multiple trees were uprooted or snapped. The tornado continued through rural areas with damage to vegetation and other structures before lifting. This tornado was rated EF1 by KERAUNOS.						

=== 26 January event ===
List of confirmed tornadoes – Monday, 26 January 2026
IF#	Location	Region	Country	Start coord.	Time (UTC)	Path length	Max. width
IFU	SW of Salve	Apulia	Italy	39.8381°N 18.2081°E	09:15	Unknown	Unknown
IFU	This waterspout moved ashore, lofting light debris and moving boats around.						

=== 30 January event ===
List of confirmed tornadoes – Friday, 30 January 2026
IF#	Location	Region	Country	Start coord.	Time (UTC)	Path length	Max. width
IF2	Plasencia	Extremadura	Spain	40.0491°N 6.0874°W	15:15	Unknown	Unknown
IF2	This strong tornado struck the northern and eastern parts of Plasencia, where it caused widespread structural and vegetation damage, particularly near the Virgen del Puerto Hospital. In this area, the roof of a parking structure was torn off and debris was hurled into nearby vehicles, damaging approximately fifty cars, some of which were overturned, while large trees were uprooted and scattered across roads and parking areas. As it continued through nearby neighborhoods, additional damage included roofs and solar panel installations being torn from buildings, façades partially collapsing, and metal structures and walls being blown down, with debris impacting surrounding structures. Industrial buildings also sustained roof damage, and urban infrastructure such as street fixtures and surfaces was disrupted, with fallen trees blocking roadways. The tornado dissipated to the northeast of the city.						

=== 31 January event ===
List of confirmed tornadoes – Saturday, 31 January 2026
IF#	Location	Region	Country	Start coord.	Time (UTC)	Path length	Max. width
IF2	Mios to W of Saint-Magne	Nouvelle-Aquitaine	France	44.6477°N 0.8374°W	11:05–11:30	23.3 km (14.5 mi)	450 m (490 yd)
IF2	A strong tornado first produced minor vegetation damage, where broken branches and topped pines were observed, before more organized damage began northwest of Mios with snapped limbs and tree damage as the tornado reached nearby residential areas. Moving east-southeast impacted multiple neighborhoods where around three hundred homes sustained damage, including torn sections of roofs, destroyed small structures, overturned walls, broken windows, and widespread debris such as trampolines, sheet metal, and branches embedded into buildings. The most significant damage occurred southeast of Mios, where small buildings were heavily damaged or torn open, large pine trees were snapped near ground level, and forested areas showed significant treefall and localized swaths of severe destruction. The tornado continued with toward the A63, where trees were downed across the roadway before moving into more rural areas where additional properties and forest plots were damaged with trees uprooted, shredded, or snapped. As it progressed farther, the damage became more sporadic and weakened, though occasional pockets of tree damage persisted. The tornado finally dissipated west of Saint-Magne after producing intermittent tree damage across forested areas. This tornado was rated EF1 by KERAUNOS.						

== February ==
IFU	IF0	IF0.5	IF1	IF1.5	IF2	IF2.5	IF3	IF4	IF5	Total
2	1	2	3	2	0	0	0	0	0	10

- One tornado has been confirmed but has not yet been rated.

=== 4 February event ===
List of confirmed tornadoes – Wednesday, 4 February 2026
IF#	Location	Region	Country	Start coord.	Time (UTC)	Path length	Max. width
IF1	Afionas	Ionian Islands	Greece	39.7247°N 19.6568°E	18:05	Unknown	Unknown
IF1	A waterspout made landfall on Corfu, tearing off at least three roofs and destroying a municipal kiosk. An olive grove along with its vegetation was destroyed.						

=== 11 February event ===
List of confirmed tornadoes – Wednesday, 11 February 2026
IF#	Location	Region	Country	Start coord.	Time (UTC)	Path length	Max. width
IF1	Borsi	Western Greece	Greece	37.9336°N 21.4364°E	18:05	Unknown	Unknown
IF1	A tornado caused damage to trees and greenhouses.						

=== 12 February event ===
List of confirmed tornadoes – Thursday, 12 February 2026
IF#	Location	Region	Country	Start coord.	Time (UTC)	Path length	Max. width
IF?	Rochefort-du-Gard	Occitanie	France	43.9734°N 4.743°E	00:30	4.5 km (2.8 mi)	75 m (82 yd)
IF?	A probable, highly localized tornado. Solar panels were blown away, and isolated vegetation (hedges and trees) was damaged.						
IF1	Ierapetra	Crete	Greece	35.0079°N 25.7613°E	20:45	Unknown	Unknown
IF1	This waterspout made landfall and damaged multiple greenhouses.						

=== 14 February event ===
List of confirmed tornadoes – Saturday, 14 February 2026
IF#	Location	Region	Country	Start coord.	Time (UTC)	Path length	Max. width
IFU	Pontinia	Lazio	Italy	41.3432°N 13.0873°E	07:00	Unknown	Unknown
IFU	A tornado reportedly caused damage, but no damage was documented.						

=== 16 February event ===
List of confirmed tornadoes – Saturday, 14 February 2026
IF#	Location	Region	Country	Start coord.	Time (UTC)	Path length	Max. width
IF1.5	Colleret, FR to Cousolre, FR to W of Beaumont, BE	Hauts-de-France (FR), Hainaut (BE)	France, Belgium	41.3432°N 13.0873°E	18:29–18:40	11.7 km (7.3 mi)	150 m (160 yd)
IF1.5	A tornado first produced minor damage in wooded areas with broken branches before more defined damage began west of Colleret, where branches were snapped and sheet metal was torn from a stable. Moving east-southeast through urban areas, it caused minor damage including broken branches, snapped conifers, torn roofing sheets, and displaced outdoor furniture before intensifying where it uprooted numerous trees of various sizes and damaged farm buildings while also removing portions of roofing from a house. After crossing a national roadway, the tornado moved into a valley, where a broad swath of hillside and riverside forest was heavily damaged with trees uprooted in multiple directions. Entering Cousolre, it impacted approximately one hundred homes, stripping roofing from dozens of buildings, breaking windows and doors through strong suction effects, toppling a pole, and scattering debris tens of meters. As it continued northeast and crossed into Belgium, the tornado weakened, producing weak damage consisting of broken branches, uprooted small trees, torn sheet metal, and displaced garden structures, before the damage became increasingly sporadic and the tornado dissipated shortly thereafter. This tornado was rated EF1 by KERAUNOS.						

=== 17 February event ===
List of confirmed tornadoes – Tuesday, 17 February 2026
IF#	Location	Region	Country	Start coord.	Time (UTC)	Path length	Max. width
IF1.5	Oria	Apulia	Italy	40.4778°N 17.6794°E	00:45	18.9 km (11.7 mi)	400 m (440 yd)
IF1.5	This tornado produced a distinct, cyclonic damage path marked by significant impacts to both structures and vegetation, including roofs that were damaged or partially torn away and areas of forest that were flattened or heavily debranched. Numerous individual trees were stripped of limbs, and debris was lofted, including a wooden board that became impaled into a wall. Vehicles were damaged after being struck by flying debris, and solar panel fields sustained notable damage as panels were impacted or displaced. The damage remained concentrated along a narrow path before the tornado dissipated.						
IF0.5	Aversa	Campania	Italy	40.9622°N 14.2023°E	14:00	1.7 km (1.1 mi)	150 m (160 yd)
IF0.5	A weak tornado downed a few trees onto buildings and powerlines, inflicted minor roof damage to buildings, and lofted light objects.						

== March ==
IFU	IF0	IF0.5	IF1	IF1.5	IF2	IF2.5	IF3	IF4	IF5	Total
3	0	0	1	2	0	0	0	0	0	6

=== 11 March event ===
List of confirmed tornadoes – Wednesday, 11 March 2026
IF#	Location	Region	Country	Start coord.	Time (UTC)	Path length	Max. width
IFU	E of Zoagli (1st tornado)	Liguria	Italy	44.3357°N 9.2724°E	11:11–11:16	Unknown	Unknown
IFU	A waterspout made landfall causing no known damage.						
IFU	E of Zoagli (2nd tornado)	Liguria	Italy	44.3361°N 9.2785°E	11:28–11:31	Unknown	Unknown
IFU	A waterspout made landfall causing no known damage.						
IFU	NW of Chiavari	Liguria	Italy	44.3372°N 9.2975°E	12:04–12:08	Unknown	Unknown
IFU	A waterspout made landfall causing no known damage.						

=== 14 March event ===
List of confirmed tornadoes – Saturday, 14 March 2026
IF#	Location	Region	Country	Start coord.	Time (UTC)	Path length	Max. width
IF1.5	Serdiana	Sardinia	Italy	39.4002°N 9.1407°E	20:11		
IF1.5	One camper was overturned and dragged for a few meters. Parachutist inside was injured.						

=== 20 March event ===
List of confirmed tornadoes – Friday, 20 March 2026
IF#	Location	Region	Country	Start coord.	Time (UTC)	Path length	Max. width
IF1	Vila Baleira	Madeira	Portugal	33.0392°N 16.3616°W	18:25	Unknown	Unknown
IF1	A tornado struck parts of Porto Santo Island, causing damage to public areas and infrastructure, including breaking large windows and overturning furniture at a hotel while also damaging windows in multiple rooms. As it moved through the area, it impacted a nearby tennis complex, causing damage to courts and uprooting several trees across the island. Additional damage occurred to buildings in the vicinity, including roof damage to nearby schools before lifting.						

=== 28 March event ===
List of confirmed tornadoes – Saturday, 28 March 2026
IF#	Location	Region	Country	Start coord.	Time (UTC)	Path length	Max. width
IF1.5	E of Alexandria	Teleorman	Romania	43.9518°N 25.4241°E	12:05–12:35	2 km (1.2 mi)	50 m (55 yd)
IF1.5	A tornado touched down Cernetu over rural land and caused damage to powerlines, roofs, cars, and snapped trees and tree branches.						

== April ==
IFU	IF0	IF0.5	IF1	IF1.5	IF2	IF2.5	IF3	IF4	IF5	Total
2	1	1	0	0	0	0	0	0	0	4

- One tornado has been confirmed but has not yet been rated.

=== 14 April event ===
List of confirmed tornadoes – Tuesday, 14 April 2026
IF#	Location	Region	Country	Start coord.	Time (UTC)	Path length	Max. width
IFU	NW of Kohtla-Järve	Ida-Viru	Estonia	59.3897°N 27.218°E	07:00	Unknown	Unknown
IFU	A landspout was spotted at the top of the ash hill in Kohtla-Järve.						

=== 16 April event ===
List of confirmed tornadoes – Thursday, 16 April 2026
IF#	Location	Region	Country	Start coord.	Time (UTC)	Path length	Max. width
IF0	WSW of San Ferdinando di Puglia	Apulia	Italy	41.2879°N 16.018°E	13:30		
IF0	A tornado lofted some plastic sheets and hung on power lines.						

=== 19 April event ===
List of confirmed tornadoes – Sunday, 19 April 2026
IF#	Location	Region	Country	Start coord.	Time (UTC)	Path length	Max. width
IF0.5	NW of Dvorce	Moravian-Silesian	Czech Republic	50.4427°N 15.3953°E	15:25	1.3 km (0.81 mi)	
IF0.5	A weak tornado caused minor damage to trees in a field.						

=== 20 April event ===
List of confirmed tornadoes – Monday, 20 April 2026
IF#	Location	Region	Country	Start coord.	Time (UTC)	Path length	Max. width
IF?	NW of Râciu	Mureș	Romania	46.6902°N 24.397°E	17:00	Unknown	Unknown
IF?	A tornado was confirmed via social media. More info to come.						

== May ==
IFU	IF0	IF0.5	IF1	IF1.5	IF2	IF2.5	IF3	IF4	IF5	Total
19	2	12	7	0	1	0	0	0	0	40

- Two tornadoes have been confirmed but have not been rated yet.

=== 5 May event ===
List of confirmed tornadoes – Tuesday, 5 May 2026
IF#	Location	Region	Country	Start coord.	Time (UTC)	Path length	Max. width
IFU	Saint-Georges	Nouvelle Aquitaine	France	46.0131°N 1.3115°W	11:00		
IFU	Waterspout filmed in front of Saint-Georges d'Oléron. About 15 funnel clouds should have been also observed.						
IF0.5	ESE of Empoli	Tuscany	Italy	43.7145°N 10.9932°E	11:00		
IF0.5	A weak wall fence collapsed.						
IF0	Tirrenia	Tuscany	Italy	43.6184°N 10.2886°E	11:45		25 m (27 yd)
IF0	A likely waterspout made landfall, damaging umbrellas and chucking lawnchairs.						
IFU	NE of Hures-la-Parade	Occitania	France	44.2648°N 3.3709°E	17:05	Unknown	Unknown
IFU	A long funnel cloud that likely made ground contact was recorded. No damage was found.						
IFU	Palamos	Catalunya	Spain	41.8414°N 3.1423°E	18:15	Unknown	Unknown
IFU	A waterspout was observed. The time was based on radar data.						

=== 6 May event ===
List of confirmed tornadoes – Wednesday, 6 May 2026
IF#	Location	Region	Country	Start coord.	Time (UTC)	Path length	Max. width
IFU	Bogliasco	Liguria	Italy	44.3684°N 9.0717°E	06:35	Unknown	Unknown
IFU	A short-lived watersprout which quickly dissipated.						
IF0.5	N of Calderara di Reno	Emilia-Romagna	Italy	44.5978°N 11.274°E	11:40	1.7 km (1.1 mi)	55 m (60 yd)
IF0.5	A tornado path was visible in satellite imagery. The tornado damaged roofs and snapped large branches from trees.						
IF0.5	ENE of Piove di Sacco	Vento	Italy	45.3142°N 12.1066°E	13:19	2 km (1.2 mi)	220 m (240 yd)
IF0.5	A tornado was observed. The tornado snapped large branches from trees, uprooted trees, and pushed light objects into a pool.						
IF0.5	SE of Misinto	Lombardy	Italy	45.6576°N 9.0962°E	13:39		
IF0.5	A tornado occurred in a forest, snapping small branches and lofting leaves.						

=== 7 May event ===
List of confirmed tornadoes – Thursday, 7 May 2026
IF#	Location	Region	Country	Start coord.	Time (UTC)	Path length	Max. width
IFU	La Manga	Murcia	Spain	37.6577°N 0.6800°W	09:15	Unknown	Unknown
IFU	Waterspout observed. Time from radar.						
IF0.5	Eastern Khimki	Moscow	Russia	55.95°N 37.31°E	13:05–13:08		20 m (22 yd)
IF0.5	A tornado was observed doing light damage.						
IFU	Kadino	Mogilev	Belarus	53.879°N 30.517°E	16:50	Unknown	Unknown
IFU	A tornado was observed causing no damage.						

=== 9 May event ===
List of confirmed tornadoes – Saturday, 9 May 2026
IF#	Location	Region	Country	Start coord.	Time (UTC)	Path length	Max. width
IF1	WNW of Coria	Cáceres	Spain	39.9672°N 6.5051°W	15:10	1.4 km (0.87 mi)	
IF1	A tornado was observed in the village of Rincón del Obispo causing damage.						

=== 11 May event ===
List of confirmed tornadoes – Monday, 11 May 2026
IF#	Location	Region	Country	Start coord.	Time (UTC)	Path length	Max. width
IF0.5	SE of Villorba	Veneto	Italy	45.7319°N 12.2519°E	11:45	2.1 km (1.3 mi)	100 m (110 yd)
IF0.5	A tornado downed trees and damaged buildings.						
IF0.5	W of Driolassa	Friuli-Venezia Giulia	Italy	45.8425°N 13.0615°E	13:25	1.6 km (0.99 mi)	
IF0.5	A tornado snapped trees and lofted light objects.						
IF0.5	ESE of Sona	Veneto	Italy	45.4262°N 10.8516°E	16:05	6.8 km (4.2 mi)	80 m (87 yd)
IF0.5	A weak tornado damaged roof, windows, and light objects.						
IF1	SW of Verona	Veneto	Italy	45.4115°N 10.9656°E	16:15	2 km (1.2 mi)	300 m (330 yd)
IF1	A tornado damaged roofs of homes and industrial or commercial buildings, doors were also ripped off.						
IFU	Caorle	Veneto	Italy	45.5810°N 12.9121°E	17:00	Unknown	Unknown
IFU	A large and long lived watersprout which stayed in the sea.						
IF1	Bibione	Veneto	Italy	45.6324°N 13.001°E	17:15	0.9 km (0.56 mi)	150 m (160 yd)
IF1	A tornado damaged trees and buildings.						

=== 13 May event ===
List of confirmed tornadoes – Wednesday, 13 May 2026
IF#	Location	Region	Country	Start coord.	Time (UTC)	Path length	Max. width
IF1	Eersel	Campine	Netherlands	51.3586°N 5.3201°E	10:45		
IF1	A tornado was observed causing damage. More info to come.						
IF0.5	Bacoli	Campania	Italy	40.8196°N 14.0649°E	14:05	1 km (0.62 mi)	30 m (33 yd)
IF0.5	Likely weak tornado damaged crops and trees.						
IFU	Western Bagnara Calabra	Calabria	Italy	38.2876°N 15.8027°E	17:15	Unknown	Unknown
IFU	Waterspout came ashore causing no damage.						

=== 14 May event ===
List of confirmed tornadoes – Thursday, 14 May 2026
IF#	Location	Region	Country	Start coord.	Time (UTC)	Path length	Max. width
IFU	NNE of Stienta	Veneto	Italy	44.9727°N 11.4921°E	10:50	Unknown	Unknown
IFU	Tornado caused no known damage.						
IF1	NNW of Fiesso Umbertiano	Veneto	Italy	44.9767°N 11.5879°E	11:00	2.5 km (1.6 mi)	90 m (98 yd)
IF1	Tornado caused damage to roofs and vegetation.						
IFU	NNW of Pincara	Veneto	Italy	44.9875°N 11.5946°E	11:10	Unknown	Unknown
IFU	Tornado caused no known damage.						
IFU	NW of Nerimdaičiai	Telšiai	Lithuania	56.1098°N 22.2896°E	14:10		
IFU	A tornado was observed near Nerimdaičiai.						
IFU	Bailleul-le-Soc	Hauts-de-France	France	49.4161°N 2.5767°E	16:10	Unknown	Unknown
IFU	A funnel was reported to have touched down and caused no reported damage.						

=== 15 May event ===
List of confirmed tornadoes – Friday, 15 May 2026
IF#	Location	Region	Country	Start coord.	Time (UTC)	Path length	Max. width
IF0	Fornells	Menorca	Spain	40.0548°N 4.1307°E	14:15		
IF0	A waterspout made landfall, causing minor damage.						

=== 16 May event ===
List of confirmed tornadoes – Saturday, 16 May 2026
IF#	Location	Region	Country	Start coord.	Time (UTC)	Path length	Max. width
IF0.5	Marina di Camerota	Campania	Italy	40.0205°N 15.3287°E	06:45		110 m (120 yd)
IF0.5	A waterspout made landfall downing walls.						

=== 18 May event ===
List of confirmed tornadoes – Monday, 18 May 2026
IF#	Location	Region	Country	Start coord.	Time (UTC)	Path length	Max. width
IFU	Eastern Emmeloord	Flevoland	Netherlands	54.5134°N 27.552°E	12:00	Unknown	Unknown
IFU	Funnel likely touched down and caused no damage.						
IFU	Wirdum	Lower Saxony	Germany	53.4776°N 7.2047°E	15:40	Unknown	Unknown
IFU	A tornado likely touched down and caused no known damage.						
IF1	E of Grynevichy	Minsk	Belarus	54.5134°N 27.552°E	16:50		
IF1	Tornado was reported to have caused damage.						

=== 19 May event ===
List of confirmed tornadoes – Tuesday, 19 May 2026
IF#	Location	Region	Country	Start coord.	Time (UTC)	Path length	Max. width
IFU	N of Glavan	Stara Zagora	Bulgaria	42.09°N 26.1°E	15:15	Unknown	Unknown
IFU	A possible tornado was observed causing no damage.						
IFU	N of Motta d'Affermo	Sicily	Italy	38.0063°N 14.2868°E	15:15	Unknown	Unknown
IFU	A tornado was reported which caused no known damage.						

=== 27 May event ===
List of confirmed tornadoes – Wednesday, 27 May 2026
IF#	Location	Region	Country	Start coord.	Time (UTC)	Path length	Max. width
IFU	Southern Beloozyorsky (1st tornado)	Moscow	Russia	55.4545°N 38.4411°E	11:00	Unknown	Unknown
IFU	Twin tornadoes likely touched down. More info to come.						
IFU	Southern Beloozyorsky (2nd tornado)	Moscow	Russia	55.4545°N 38.4411°E	11:00	Unknown	Unknown
IFU	Twin tornadoes likely touched down. More info to come.						

=== 30 May event ===
List of confirmed tornadoes – Saturday, 30 May 2026
IF#	Location	Region	Country	Start coord.	Time (UTC)	Path length	Max. width
IF2	Balcarzowice	Strzelce	Poland	50.4632°N 18.3762°E	15:16–15:22	5.4 km (3.4 mi)	220 m (240 yd)
IF2	A multi-vortex tornado caused significant damage to structures and injured 1 person after being struck by debris. More info to come.						

=== 31 May event ===
List of confirmed tornadoes – Sunday, 31 May 2026
IF#	Location	Region	Country	Start coord.	Time (UTC)	Path length	Max. width
IF0.5	SW of Týn nad Vltavou	South Bohemian	Czech Republic	49.2045°N 14.4018°E	12:43–12:44		
IF0.5	A weak tornado was observed by a CCTV camera. More info to come.						
IF0.5	SE of Netolice	South Bohemian	Czech Republic	49.0272°N 14.2272°E	13:20–13:30	0.6 km (0.37 mi)	15 m (16 yd)
IF0.5	A tornado was documented by Czech storm spotters. More info to come.						

== June ==
IFU	IF0	IF0.5	IF1	IF1.5	IF2	IF2.5	IF3	IF4	IF5	Total
20	1	6	4	4	2	0	0	0	0	37

=== 2 June event ===
List of confirmed tornadoes – Tuesday, 2 June 2026
IF#	Location	Region	Country	Start coord.	Time (UTC)	Path length	Max. width
IFU	Pegli	Liguria	Italy	44.4182°N 8.7951°E	06:00	Unknown	Unknown
IFU	A waterspout briefly came ashore causing no damage.						
IF0	Easern Genoa	Liguria	Italy	44.392°N 8.9806°E	06:45–06:57		
IF0	A tornado touched down in the Boccadasse neighborhood lofting boats and other light objects.						
IFU	S of Termes	Luxembourg	Belgium	49.6948°N 5.4446°E	14:50		
IFU	A possible tornado severely damaged stables and downed branches of trees.						
IF0.5	SW of Musile di Piave	Veneto	Italy	45.5854°N 12.4874°E	18:05		
IF0.5	A tornado touched down damaging roof tiles.						

=== 3 June event ===
List of confirmed tornadoes – Wednesday, 3 June 2026
IF#	Location	Region	Country	Start coord.	Time (UTC)	Path length	Max. width
IF1	Northern Rome	Lazio	Italy	41.9403°N 12.5258°E	06:49–06:57	6.4 km (4.0 mi)	400 m (440 yd)
IF1	A tornado uprooted trees and injured 2 people.						
IF0.5	Southern Terracina	Lazio	Italy	41.2843°N 13.2417°E	08:00		
IF0.5	A waterspout made landfall lofting light objects from a beaching facility.						
IFU	N of Licola	Campania	Italy	40.8864°N 14.0392°E	09:55	Unknown	Unknown
IFU	A waterspout made landfall causing no reported damage.						

=== 4 June event ===
List of confirmed tornadoes – Thursday, 4 June 2026
IF#	Location	Region	Country	Start coord.	Time (UTC)	Path length	Max. width
IF0.5	W of Ksamil	Vlorë	Albania	39.768°N 19.99°E	07:40		
IF0.5	A waterspout made landfall causing light damage.						
IF1.5	Glanerbrug, NL to N of Gronau, DE	Overijssel (NL), North Rhine-Westphalia (DE)	Netherlands, Germany	52.2065°N 6.964°E	10:48		
IF1.5	A tornado blew roofs off and down trees, it then crossed into Germany where it damaged roofs.						
IFU	Lviv	Lviv	Ukraine	49.8393°N 24.0299°E	14:45	Unknown	Unknown
IFU	A rope tornado was observed causing no damage.						

=== 5 June event ===
List of confirmed tornadoes – Friday, 5 June 2026
IF#	Location	Region	Country	Start coord.	Time (UTC)	Path length	Max. width
IF1	N of Inulec to Cudnochy	Mrągowo	Poland	53.817°N 21.462°E	12:22	3 km (1.9 mi)	
IF1	A tornado uprooted a spruce tree, and snapped weak pine trees in a forest nearby.						
IF0.5	Děčín	Děčín, Ústecky kraj	Czech Republic	50.7822°N 14.2156°E	13:00	1.3 km (0.81 mi)	
IF0.5	A tornado caused ground damage, and uprooted a weak tree.						
IFU	Rauna	Vidzeme	Latvia	57.3000°N 25.6500°E	14:20		
IFU	A tornado was observed.						
IFU	NW of Raguva	Panevėžys	Lithuania	55.5404°N 24.4993°E	15:00		
IFU	A tornado was observed. More info to come.						
IF1.5	Antanavas	Marijampolė	Lithuania	54.7044°N 23.3072°E	16:11		
IF1.5	A tornado was observed snapping large branches.						
IFU	Kupiškis	Panevėžys	Lithuania	55.8389°N 24.976°E	16:25		
IFU	A tornado was observed. More info to come.						
IF2	Southern Kaunas	Kaunas	Lithuania	54.8585°N 23.9118°E	17:24	3 km (1.9 mi)	200 m (220 yd)
IF2	A tornado destroyed roofs, uprooted trees, and damaged vehicles.						

=== 7 June event ===
List of confirmed tornadoes – Sunday, 7 June 2026
IF#	Location	Region	Country	Start coord.	Time (UTC)	Path length	Max. width
IFU	E of Vipperød	Holbæk	Denmark	55.6721°N 11.7700°E	10:50	Unknown	Unknown
IFU	Twin landspouts were observed causing no damage.						
IFU	E of Vipperød	Holbæk	Denmark	55.6721°N 11.7700°E	10:50	Unknown	Unknown
IFU	Twin landspouts were observed causing no damage.						

=== 10 June event ===
List of confirmed tornadoes – Wednesday, 10 June 2026
IF#	Location	Region	Country	Start coord.	Time (UTC)	Path length	Max. width
IFU	W of Třebíč	Vysočina	Czech Republic	49.2174°N 15.8153°E	08:33	Unknown	Unknown
IFU	A tornado likely touched down causing no damage.						
IFU	E of Jemnice	Vysočina	Czech Republic	49.017°N 15.6456°E	09:10	Unknown	Unknown
IFU	A tornado likely touched down causing no damage.						
IFU	SW of Boulay-Moselle	Grand Est	France	49.1731°N 6.4845°E	13:15–13:20		
IFU	A well-defined tornado was documented.						
IFU	NW of Bregenz	Voralberg	Austria	47.1358°N 10.6989°E	14:50		
IFU	A tornado was observed.						
IF1	WNW of Sona	Veneto	Italy	45.4402°N 10.7941°E	16:03	0.6 km (0.37 mi)	50 m (55 yd)
IF1	A tornado uprooted trees.						
IF1.5	S of Bussolengo	Veneto	Italy	45.4643°N 10.8504°E	16:10	1.6 km (0.99 mi)	150 m (160 yd)
IF1.5	A tornado severely damaged roofs and downed trees.						

=== 12 June event ===
List of confirmed tornadoes – Friday, 12 June 2026
IF#	Location	Region	Country	Start coord.	Time (UTC)	Path length	Max. width
IFU	Ozerna	Ternopil	Ukraine	49.6428°N 30.131°E	11:30–11:45		
IFU	A tornado likely touched down causing damage. More info to come.						

=== 13 June event ===
List of confirmed tornadoes – Saturday, 13 June 2026
IF#	Location	Region	Country	Start coord.	Time (UTC)	Path length	Max. width
IF0.5	Semechnice	Hradec Králové	Czech Republic	50.2602°N 16.1484°E	10:33		
IF0.5	A tornado caused damage. More info to come.						

=== 15 June event ===
List of confirmed tornadoes – Monday, 15 June 2026
IF#	Location	Region	Country	Start coord.	Time (UTC)	Path length	Max. width
IFU	N of Jelgava	Zemgale	Latvia	56.7017°N 23.7058°E	08:05–08:16		
IFU	A tornado was observed in Vītoliņi. More info to come.						
IF1	Yläne	Pöytyä	Finland	60.8801°N 22.4102°E	17:15	3 km (1.9 mi)	
IF1	A tornado damaged a roof off a dance pavilion. More info to come.						

=== 16 June event ===
List of confirmed tornadoes – Tuesday, 16 June 2026
IF#	Location	Region	Country	Start coord.	Time (UTC)	Path length	Max. width
IFU	Tuszynki	Bukowiec	Poland	53.4086°N 18.1757°E	11:00		
IFU	A tornado was observed. More info to come.						
IFU	W of Foggia	Apulia	Italy	41.4578°N 15.4498°E	12:03–12:16	Unknown	Unknown
IFU	A landspout tornado was observed causing no damage.						

=== 19 June event ===
List of confirmed tornadoes – Friday, 19 June 2026
IF#	Location	Region	Country	Start coord.	Time (UTC)	Path length	Max. width
IF1.5	Leybuchtpolder	Lower Saxony	Germany	53.5225°N 7.1387°E	23:05		
IF1.5	A tornado was observed damaging trees. More info to come.						

=== 26 June event ===
List of confirmed tornadoes – Friday, 26 June 2026
IF#	Location	Region	Country	Start coord.	Time (UTC)	Path length	Max. width
IFU	Athenry	Galway	Ireland	53.3008°N 8.7455°W	15:50	Unknown	Unknown
IFU	A damaging tornado was observed. More info to come.						

=== 27 June event ===
List of confirmed tornadoes – Friday, June 27, 2026
EF#	Location	Region	State/Province	Start coord.	Time (UTC)	Path length	Max. width
IFU	W of Hoogland	Amersfoort	Netherlands	58.2826°N 59.7647°E	02:00		
IFU	A tornado damaged crops, roofs and internet connections to some people. More info to come.						
IFU	N of Skwierzyna	Lubuskie	Poland	52.6005°N 15.5026°E	22:00		
IFU	Firefighters in Skwierzyna reported a tornado that damaged a roof and moved a trailer. More info to come.						

=== 29 June event ===
List of confirmed tornadoes – Sunday, 29 June 2026
IF#	Location	Region	Country	Start coord.	Time (UTC)	Path length	Max. width
IF2	NE of Mantua	Lombardy	Italy	45.1764°N 10.822°E	22:05		
IF2	A tornado partially destroyed a home, vegatation and other buildings were also damaged or destroyed. More info to come.						

=== 30 June event ===
List of confirmed tornadoes – Monday, June 30, 2026
EF#	Location	Region	State/Province	Start coord.	Time (UTC)	Path length	Max. width
IF0.5	Fontanelle	Puglia	Italy	45.8250°N 12.4534°E	15:40		
IF0.5	A tornado lifted light objects into the sea. More info to come.						

== July ==
IFU	IF0	IF0.5	IF1	IF1.5	IF2	IF2.5	IF3	IF4	IF5	Total
7	3	4	3	4	3	0	0	0	0	26

- Two tornadoes have been confirmed but have not been rated yet.

=== July 1 event ===
List of confirmed tornadoes – Wednesday, July 1, 2026
EF#	Location	Region	State/Province	Start coord.	Time (UTC)	Path length	Max. width
IF0.5	E of Asiago	Veneto	Italy	45.8763°N 11.5478°E	08:20		
IF0.5	A tornado caused minor damage to a roof and snapped small branches.						
IF0	Fehmarn	Schleswig-Holstein	Germany	54.4685°N 11.1342°E	15:09		
IF0	A large tornado struck the island of Fehmarn. More info to come.						
IF0.5	EE of Sellia Marina	Calabria	Italy	39.0565°N 16.5249°E	13:35		
IF0.5	A tornado was observed. More info to come.						
IFU	Hegyeshalom	Győr-Moson-Sopron	Hungary	47.9129°N 17.1544°E	14:05		
IFU	A tornado was observed. More info to come.						

=== July 5 event ===
List of confirmed tornadoes – Sunday, July 5, 2026
EF#	Location	Region	State/Province	Start coord.	Time (UTC)	Path length	Max. width
IFU	Petergof	Saint Petersburg	Russia	59.8842°N 29.9001°E	11:30		
IFU	A likely tornado caused no damage. More info to come.						
IF1	Ivanovo	Ivanovo	Russia	56.9743°N 41.024°E	15:30		
IF1	A tornado destroyed a roof off a brick building, lifted wooden planks, downed trees, caused minor outages and carried a greenhouse away. More info to come.						

=== July 6 event ===
List of confirmed tornadoes – Monday, July 6, 2026
EF#	Location	Region	State/Province	Start coord.	Time (UTC)	Path length	Max. width
IFU	W of Saint Petersburg	Leningrad Oblast	Russia	59.9515°N 30.2223°E	11:30		
IFU	There was an attempt to form a waterspout.						
IF0	W of Polotsk	Vitebsk	Belarus	55.4839°N 28.7235°E	14:20–14:32	Unknown	Unknown
IF0	A multi-vortex tornado was spotted doing minimal damage.						
IF0.5	Spigno Saturnia	Lazio	Italy	41.3055°N 13.7337°E	14:40		
IF0.5	A tornado caused minor damage to roofs.						

=== July 15 event ===
List of confirmed tornadoes – Wednesday, July 15, 2026
EF#	Location	Region	State/Province	Start coord.	Time (UTC)	Path length	Max. width
IF2	Bagnatica	Lombardia	Italy	45.6568°N 9.7668°E	15:03		
IF2	A tornado lifted a car into tables, other light objects lifted or damaged. large tents collapsed. More info to come.						

=== July 16 event ===
List of confirmed tornadoes – Thursday, July 16, 2026
EF#	Location	Region	State/Province	Start coord.	Time (UTC)	Path length	Max. width
IF1.5	N of Saint-Étienne	Auvergne	France	45.4741°N 4.3780°E	16:00	2.5 km (1.6 mi)	600 m (660 yd)
IF1.5	A tornado was observed snapping and uprooting trees, damaging cars and sliding trucks. More info to come. This tornado was rated EF1 by KERAUNOS.						

=== July 18 event ===
List of confirmed tornadoes – Saturday, July 18, 2026
EF#	Location	Region	State/Province	Start coord.	Time (UTC)	Path length	Max. width
IF?	NW of Flo	Västergötland	Sweden	58.3556°N 12.5669°E	07:45	1.08 km (0.67 mi)	
IF?	A tornado was observed forming over a field. More info to come.						

=== July 19 event ===
List of confirmed tornadoes – Sunday, July 19, 2026
EF#	Location	Region	State/Province	Start coord.	Time (UTC)	Path length	Max. width
IF1.5	SW of Ossala	Staszów	Poland	58.4848°N 21.3732°E	17:04		
IF1.5	A tornado snapped trees at IF1.5 intensity and damaged roofs.						

=== July 21 event ===
List of confirmed tornadoes – Tuesday, July 21, 2026
EF#	Location	Region	State/Province	Start coord.	Time (UTC)	Path length	Max. width
IFU	NNW of Raseiniai	Kaunas County	Lithuania	55.4012°N 23.1063°E	15:15		
IFU	A likely tornado was observed near a road. No damages were reported.						
IF2	SE of Ancona	Marche	Italy	43.4367°N 13.6633°E	12:30		
IF2	An IF2 coastal landspout tornado was observed. Trees were uprooted, houses and cars were severely damaged.						

=== July 24 event ===
List of confirmed tornadoes – Friday, July 24, 2026
EF#	Location	Region	State/Province	Start coord.	Time (UTC)	Path length	Max. width
IF0	SE of Lipnica Murowana	Bochnia	Poland	49.8427°N 20.5532°E	16:45		
IF0	A weak tornado was observed. Preliminary information.						

=== July 26 event ===
List of confirmed tornadoes – Sunday, July 26, 2026
EF#	Location	Region	State/Province	Start coord.	Time (UTC)	Path length	Max. width
IFU	Western Livorno	Tuscany	Italy	43.5395°N 10.3015°E	04:40	Unknown	Unknown
IFU	A weak tornado transported a trash bin onto a roof.						
IF1	Oederquart	Lower Saxony	Germany	53.7827°N 9.2423°E	16:35		
IF1	A tornado hit the village of oederquart, damaging several houses, completely destroying greenhouses, and damaging vehicles that were struck by flying debris.						
IF1.5	Glückstadt	Schleswig-Holstein	Germany	53.7879°N 9.4253°E	16:50	3.9 km (2.4 mi)	75 m (82 yd)
IF1.5	A tornado damaged 50–60 houses, leaving several structurally compromised. It also tore down railway overhead lines and scattered heavy debris before dissipating in Sommerland.						
IF2	Groß Offenseth-Aspern	Schleswig-Holstein	Germany	53.8172°N 9.7291°E	17:10		
IF2	A tornado lifted two shipping containers >1 m (1.1 yd) flipping them. Two cars were hit by the vortex and one of them was damaged beyond repair. Preliminary Information.						

=== July 27 event ===
List of confirmed tornadoes – Monday, July 27, 2026
EF#	Location	Region	State/Province	Start coord.	Time (UTC)	Path length	Max. width
IF1.5	Northern Fülesd	Szabolcs–Szatmár–Bereg	Hungary	43.5395°N 10.3015°E	16:20		
IF1.5	A tornado snapped trunks of trees and severely damaged roofs.						

=== July 28 event ===
List of confirmed tornadoes – Tuesday, July 28, 2026
EF#	Location	Region	State/Province	Start coord.	Time (UTC)	Path length	Max. width
IF1.5	NW of Tärendö	Norrbotten	Sweden	67.2500°N 22.5000°E	13:25		
IF1.5	A tornado downed thousands of trees. More info to come.						

== August ==
IFU	IF0	IF0.5	IF1	IF1.5	IF2	IF2.5	IF3	IF4	IF5	Total
29	3	12	9	12	6	2	1	0	0	74

=== August 1 event ===
List of confirmed tornadoes – Saturday, August 1, 2026
EF#	Location	Region	State/Province	Start coord.	Time (UTC)	Path length	Max. width
IF1.5	Didžioji Riešė to SSE of Riešė to S of Avižieniai	Vilnius County	Lithuania	54.7719°N 25.1917°E	18:50	7.96 km (4.95 mi)	
IF1.5	A nocturnal tornado occurred south of an existing squall. It first inflicted IF1 damages to trees and vegetation in Didžioji Riešė, before entering the Vanagine Geomorphological Reserve, inflicting IF1.5 damage and leaving a partial scar visible on satellite imagery. It exits the reserve, entering the town of Lindiniškes and Užudvarionys both of which are south of Riešė, inflicting IF1 damages to more trees, before entering Bukiškis and blowing down a fence, partially deroofing a 2 story family home, uprooting a tree, and blocking roads with damaged branches. It crossed the highway inflicting no major damage, before entering Tarandė, a town south of Avižieniai. It then intensified to IF1.5 intensity and damaged more trees before dissipating. Multiple damage indicators are uncertain, and the rating is either IF1.5 or IF2. More info to come.						
IF1.5	NN of Svir to NE of Gervyaty	Hrodna	Belarus	54.5979°N 26.2232°E	19:00	10 km (6.2 mi)	
IF1.5	A tornado damaged trees, damaged roofs, bent or thrown to the ground, damaged power lines and hay bales were thrown several hundred meters away.						
IF1.5	Užubaliai	Vilnius County	Lithuania	54.7736°N 25.1973°E	21:25		
IF1.5	A tornado destroyed a private carpark, blew off a fence and damaged trees.						

=== August 6 event ===
List of confirmed tornadoes – Tuesday, August 6, 2026
EF#	Location	Region	State/Province	Start coord.	Time (UTC)	Path length	Max. width
IF1.5	SE of Leipalingis	Alytus County	Lithuania	54.0744°N 23.9048°E	16:00	Unknown	Unknown
IF1.5	A tornado damaged trees and destroyed an active under construction barn structure.						

=== August 12 event ===
List of confirmed tornadoes – Wednesday, August 12, 2026
EF#	Location	Region	State/Province	Start coord.	Time (UTC)	Path length	Max. width
IFU	Empoli	Toscana	Italy	43.717°N 10.950°E	14:55		
IFU	A landspout touched down in Italy. No known damage occurred.						

=== August 16 event ===
List of confirmed tornadoes – Sunday, August 16, 2026
EF#	Location	Region	State/Province	Start coord.	Time (UTC)	Path length	Max. width
IFU	NW of Ragusa	Sicilia	Italy	36.92678°N 14.83662°E	10:15		
IFU	Uprooted trees, damage to roofs, light objects and branches lofted or moved around. To be updated.						

=== August 17 event ===
List of confirmed tornadoes – Monday, August 17, 2026
EF#	Location	Region	State/Province	Start coord.	Time (UTC)	Path length	Max. width
IFU	Carpignano Salentino	Puglia	Italy	40.1661°N 18.3566°E	11:15		
IFU	A landspout touched down. Light objects were lofted and no known damage occurred.						
IF2	Eferding	Oberösterreich	Austria	48.7423°N 14.1466°E	13:43	0.3 km	22.5 m
IF2	Multiple roofs were damage with lost roof tiles and sheathing. The roof of a house was damaged badly. Crowns were ripped off trees. The tornado had large differences in intensity over small distances.						

=== August 19 event ===
List of confirmed tornadoes – Wednesday, August 19, 2026
EF#	Location	Region	State/Province	Start coord.	Time (UTC)	Path length	Max. width
IF1	SW of Dragør	Dragør Kommune	Denmark	55.5914°N 12.6695°E	08:00	0.61 km (0.38 mi)	60 yd (55 m)
IF1	A tornado formed near the shore, tossing tree branches, damaging straw roofs, downing roof tiles, damaging cars, sucking out items from a house and ripping off a flagpole. More info to come.						
IF0	S of Palanga, N of Nemirseta	Klaipeda County	Lithuania	55.8888°N 21.0532°E	13:20	2.02 km (1.26 mi)	3 yd (2.7 m)
IF0	A waterspout was observed southwest of Palanga, which it later was filmed as it came ashore. The tornadic waterspout injured a child, picked up trash and sand and later on a bird. It then impacted a beach bar and injured 6 more. It then shortly dissipated and reappeared near a path that leads to the beach and likely damaged tree branches. It then crossed a road and went into the north part of Nemirseta and did no damage, before going southeast and dissipating near a greenhouse.						
IFU	SW of Ladushkin	Kaliningrad	Russia	54.5428°N 20.1319°E	14:58	Unknown	Unknown
IFU	A tornado caused damage to trees.						
IF1	S of Fürstenwalde/Spree, Fürstenwalde/Sür	Brandenburg	Germany	52.3444°N 14.0650°E	15:15	Unknown	Unknown
IF1	A tornado was observed and filmed. It crossed into Fürstenwalde/Sür while lifting roofs and downing trees. Preliminary information, more info to come.						
IF1	SSW of Kaliningrad	Kaliningrad	Russia	54.6025°N 20.4324°E	15:32	Unknown	Unknown
IF1	A tornado caused damage to trees, greenhouses and roofs. The tornado destroyed a brick wall of a building later on.						
IFU	SSE of Kaliningrad	Kaliningrad	Russia	54.6149°N 20.5513°E	15:40	Unknown	Unknown
IFU	A low-topped supercell produced a brief tornado.						
IF0.5	W of Miesiączkowo, E of Zaborowo	Brodnica	Poland	53.2257°N 19.6139°E	15:45	Unknown	Unknown
IF0.5	A tornado was observed on radar from a tornadic thunderstorm. A metal sheathing was partially torn off. More info to come.						
IF1	Manhay to Vaux-Chavanne	Wallonia	Belgium	50.2931°N 5.6761°E	15:47	Unknown	Unknown
IF1	A tornado downed trees and blew off roof tiles.						
IF1	SW of Lugovoe	Kaliningrad	Russia	54.6508°N 20.6342°E	15:51	Unknown	Unknown
IF1	A tornado caused damage to trees and roofs.						
IF0.5	ENE of Les Villettes	Wallonia	Belgium	50.3324°N 5.7791°E	15:53	Unknown	Unknown
IF0.5	A tornado uprooted trees.						
IF0.5	SE of Trois-Ponts	Wallonia	Belgium	50.3411°N 5.8970°E	16:02	Unknown	Unknown
IF0.5	A tornado uprooted trees.						
IF0.5	SESE of Stavelot	Wallonia	Belgium	50.3668°N 6.0374°E	16:08	Unknown	Unknown
IF0.5	A tornado uprooted trees and damaged some roofs.						
IF1.5	Faymonville	Wallonia	Belgium	50.4051°N 6.1398°E	16:13	Unknown	Unknown
IF1.5	A tornado uprooted and snapped trees and partially destroyed a roof.						
IF2.5	SW of Büllingen	Wallonia	Belgium	50.4041°N 6.2488°E	16:17	Unknown	Unknown
IF2.5	A tornado nearly completely destroyed an outbuilding, snapped trees, damaged other roofs.						
IF1	Westerwald	Rheinland-Pfalz	Germany	50.4565°N 7.7885°E	17:35	1.9 km (1.2 mi)	190 m (210 yd)
IF1	A tornado was observed doing considerable damage. Preliminary information, more info to come.						
IF1.5	N of Höhr-Grenzhausen	Rheinland-Pfalz	Germany	50.4383°N 7.6703°E	17:35	4.8 km (3.0 mi)	330 m (360 yd)
IF1.5	A tornado damaged 2 exterior walls of a house and multiple roofs and snapped trees.						
IF1.5	NE of Wirges	Rheinland-Pfalz	Germany	50.4810°N 7.8422°E	17:40	Unknown	Unknown
IF1.5	A tornado occurred.						
IF1.5	E of Wetzlar	Rheinland-Pfalz	Germany	50.5509°N 8.5761°E	18:13	Unknown	Unknown
IF1.5	A tornado damaged around 60 houses, with damages ranging from roof tiles being blown off to roofs completely torn off their foundations. Roof tiles were blown hundreds of meters away.						
IF1.5	E of Gießen	Hessen	Germany	50.5796°N 8.6865°E	18:15	2.4 km (1.5 mi)	150 m (160 yd)
IF1.5	A tornado damaged trees in a forest. More info to come.						
IF2	NE of Braunfels, S of Solms	Hessen	Germany	50.5249°N 8.4057°E	18:17	1.85 km (1.15 mi)	230 m (250 yd)
IF2	A tornado was observed damaging roofs and trees. Preliminary information, more info to come.						
IFU	SW of Kolnik	Gdansk	Poland	54.1511°N 18.6990°E	18:25	Unknown	Unknown
IFU	A brief tornado was observed.						
IF0.5	E of Nawiady	Mrągowo	Poland	53.7145°N 21.3451°E	18:27	Unknown	Unknown
IF0.5	Isolated wind damage was reported after the passing of a supercell. Tornado was the most likely event.						
IF1	SE of Lich	Hessen	Germany	50.5094°N 8.8305°E	18:30	0.65 km (0.40 mi)	110 m (120 yd)
IF1	A tornado damaged roofs and downed trees. More info to come.						
IF2	NNE of Ulrichstein	Hessen	Germany	50.6192°N 9.2277°E	19:00	Unknown	Unknown
IF2	A tornado occurred. No damage reports are available, but has a final rating of IF2.						
IF2	EE of Lauterbach	Hessen	Germany	50.6433°N 9.5127°E	19:13	Unknown	Unknown
IF2	A tornado severely damaged a barn to the point where it collapsed.						
IF2	ESE of Dipperz	Hessen	Germany	50.5250°N 9.8286°E	19:20	1.5 km (0.93 mi)	210 m (230 yd)
IF2	A tornado heavily damaged trees, tornadic crop damage patters visible. Intensity of this tornado is tied between IF1.5 and IF2, intensity ratings to come.						
IF1	E of Ohrdruf	Thuringia	Germany	50.8122°N 10.6803°E	20:06	1.2 km (0.75 mi)	60 m (66 yd)
IF1	A satellite tornado formed north of the Ohrdruf tornado.						
IF2.5	Tambach-Dietharz to S of Gräfenhain, S of Ohrdruf	Thuringia	Germany	50.8179°N 10.7135°E	20:10	13.2 km (8.2 mi)	600 m (660 yd)
IF2.5	A significant wide tornado formed near Tambach-Dietharz, damaging multiple trees in a forest. It then shortly dissipated, but reappeared within a short time, continuing to damage forests. Denuded trees were reported south of Ohrdruf. Previous rating was IF3, but later in October 2026, the ESSL found no evidence of DoD 7, which resulted in the new rating of IF2.5, released to the database officially on October 6. The tornado was previously split in 2 events, but now will be connected as signs of connection between an IF1.5 tornado and the main Ohrdruf tornado was found in late September 2026.						
IF1.5	ESE of Hennersdorf	Sachsen	Germany	50.7914°N 13.0932°E	20:06	3.2 km (2.0 mi)	200 m (220 yd)
IF1.5	A tornado uprooted and snapped trees, crossed the Zschopau River and damaged more trees.						

=== August 20 event ===
List of confirmed tornadoes – Thursday, August 13, 2026
EF#	Location	Region	State/Province	Start coord.	Time (UTC)	Path length	Max. width
IFU	Den Helder	North Holland	Netherlands	52.958°N 4.7603°E	09:30		
IFU	A tornado was observed. No damage was reported.						
IFU	E of Leeuwarden	Friesland	Netherlands	53.2302°N 5.8779°E	10:43		
IFU	A tornado was observed near a nature area.						
IFU	Dokkum	Friesland	Netherlands	53.3244°N 5.9992°E	13:00		
IFU	A tornado was observed near Dokkum. Multiple funnel clouds were observed nearby.						
IF0.5	Torino	Piedmont	Italy	45.103°N 7.6884°E	15:10	0.9 km	50 m
IF0.5	A landspout downed branches and trees and a gutter ended up against a pole.						
IF0.5	Deiva Marina	Liguria	Italy	44.2156°N 9.5168°E	15:25	1 km	50 m
IF0.5	A mesocyclonic waterspout touched down. Beach cabins were moved or damaged, snapped branches, and light objects were damaged.						
IFU	Chivasso	Piedmont	Italy	45.1932°N 7.8878°E	15:30		
IFU	A landspout downed a wall fence, branches and trees.						

=== August 21 event ===
List of confirmed tornadoes – Friday, August 21, 2026
EF#	Location	Region	State/Province	Start coord.	Time (UTC)	Path length	Max. width
IFU	Sestri Levante	Liguria	Italy	44.2555°N 9.4038°E	08:30		
IFU	A tornado was observed. No known damage was reported.						
IFU	Framura	Liguria	Italy	44.1953°N 9.5562°E	08:30		
IFU	A tornado was observed. No known damage was reported.						
IF0	Lido di Camaiore	Tuscany	Italy	43.8907°N 10.2263°E	09:53-10:01	0.4 km	30 m
IF0	A waterspout touched down, which damaged a beaching facility lightly and lofted light objects.						
IF1.5	Kobdilj	Sežana	Slovenia	45.8126°N 13.8584°E	13:12		
IF1.5	A tornado was observed, causing major damage to roofs and trees, 15 buildings were damaged, including 5 buildings that were seriously damaged.						
IF0.5	Lignano Sabbiadoro	Friuli-Venezia Giulia	Italy	45.6816°N 13.1342°E	13:40	0.2 km	20 m
IF0.5	A tornado damaged gazebos, umbrellas and lawnchairs, and downed trees and tree branches.						
IF1	W of Grado	Friuli-Venezia Giulia	Italy	45.6771°N 13.4021°E	13:45		
IF1	A tornado was seen downing trees on cars, campers and caravans, damaging roofs, tossing around lawnchairs and umbrellas. 1 person was injured.						
IF1.5	NE of Połomia	Silesian Voivodeship	Poland	50.4906°N 18.7185°E	22:03-22:06	3 km	200 m
IF1.5	A rural tornado formed and dissipated in the Brynek Forest District. It uprooted 5,000 cubic meters of timber. After the tornado, it is banned to enter the forest.						

=== August 22 event ===
List of confirmed tornadoes – Saturday, August 22, 2026
EF#	Location	Region	State/Province	Start coord.	Time (UTC)	Path length	Max. width
IF0.5	EE of Vilkija	Kaunas County	Lithuania	55.0409°N 23.6674°E	11:00	Unknown	Unknown
IF0.5	A tornado went through Padauguva, damaged trees and parts of roofs of houses.						
IFU	S of Kelynack	Cornwall	United Kingdom	50.099°N 5.654°W	14:50		
IFU	A landspout touched down near Land's End Airport, and crossed into the outskirts of Runway 16, likely passing by Runway 20. No known damage occurred.						

=== August 23 event ===
List of confirmed tornadoes – Sunday, August 23, 2026
EF#	Location	Region	State/Province	Start coord.	Time (UTC)	Path length	Max. width
IF0.5	NE of Lido degli Estensi	Emilia-Romagna	Italy	44.6735°N 12.2474°E	10:47	0.6 km	30 m
IF0.5	A tornado lofted umbrellas, lawnchairs and other light objects. At least two beachgoers were injured by debris, and two more injured by a window blowing out at a restaurant.						

=== August 24 event ===
List of confirmed tornadoes – Monday, August 24, 2026
EF#	Location	Region	State/Province	Start coord.	Time (UTC)	Path length	Max. width
IFU	S of Le Port	Occitania	France	42.8086°N 1.3811°E	13:20		
IFU	A long funnel cloud was observed near the border of Andorra. More info to come.						
IF3 (EF3)	SSW of Carcassonne	Occitania	France	43.1119°N 2.2907°E	15:04	6.3 km (3.9 mi)	600 m (660 yd)
IF3 (EF3)	A large tornado damaged or destroyed 300 homes, injuring 41, including 15 that were evacuated to a hospital. Shelters were open overnight to accommodate over 1,000 people in need. 2 people were reported missing. A third of a castle was destroyed. 2,800 households had no electricity in the morning after the event. Several roads have been closed. Around 120 firemen were deployed. It was rated EF3 by KERAUNOS and IF3 by ESWD.						

=== August 25 event ===
List of confirmed tornadoes – Tuesday, August 25, 2026
EF#	Location	Region	State/Province	Start coord.	Time (UTC)	Path length	Max. width
IFU	ESE of Acquapendente	Lazio	Italy	42.7233°N 11.9272°E	09:10		
IFU	A tornado was observed. No known damage.						
IFU	NE of Orvieto	Umbria	Italy	42.7221°N 12.1319°E	09:35		
IFU	A tornado downed trees.						
IF0.5	Civitella Cesi	Lazio	Italy	42.2139°N 12.026°E	10:40		
IF0.5	A tornado damaged roofs and fencing, downed trees and made debris fall on cars.						
IF0.5	SSE of Rome	Lazio	Italy	41.518°N 12.7784°E	12:10	1 km	
IF0.5	A tornado was observed which lofted greenhouse covers to great heights, downed trees and branches, and damaged power lines.						
IFU	N of Neufchâteau	Grand Est	France	48.381°N 5.6942°E	14:47		
IFU	A tornado was observed. More info to come.						

=== August 29 event ===
List of confirmed tornadoes – Saturday, August 29, 2026
EF#	Location	Region	State/Province	Start coord.	Time (UTC)	Path length	Max. width
IF2	NW of Tholen	Zeeland	The Netherlands	52.3444°N 14.0650°E	20:30		
IF2	A tornado damaged sheds, roofs and trees. Large trees destroyed, more info to come.						

=== August 31 event ===
List of confirmed tornadoes – Monday, August 31, 2026
EF#	Location	Region	State/Province	Start coord.	Time (UTC)	Path length	Max. width
IF0	N of Hillerød	Hillerød Kommune	Denmark	55.9028°N 12.2842°E	12:25		
IF0	A tornado was observed. More info to come.						

== September ==
IFU	IF0	IF0.5	IF1	IF1.5	IF2	IF2.5	IF3	IF4	IF5	Total
6	1	2	4	3	1	0	0	0	0	17

=== September 1 event ===
List of confirmed tornadoes – Tuesday, September 1, 2026
EF#	Location	Region	State/Province	Start coord.	Time (UTC)	Path length	Max. width
IFU	SW of Ugento	Puglia	Italy	39.8930°N 18.1137°E	13:15	Unknown	Unknown
IFU	A landspout ripped off a sliding gate.						
IFU	E of Biržai	Panevėžys County	Lithuania	56.1999°N 24.7571°E	12:20		
IFU	A tornado was observed and filmed in a field. No damage reported.						
IFU	SE of Minsk	Minsk Region	Belarus	53.8490°N 28.0082°E	16:15		
IFU	A tornado was observed near Minsk National Airport by a local storm spotter.						

=== September 2 event ===
List of confirmed tornadoes – Wednesday, September 2, 2026
EF#	Location	Region	State/Province	Start coord.	Time (UTC)	Path length	Max. width
IFU	NW of Højer	Southern Denmark	Denmark	54.9904°N 8.6371°E	07:55		
IFU	A waterspout made landfall north of Emmerlev. More info to come.						

=== September 4 event ===
List of confirmed tornadoes – Friday, September 4, 2026
EF#	Location	Region	State/Province	Start coord.	Time (UTC)	Path length	Max. width
IF0.5	W of Scilla	Calabria	Italy	38.2499°N 15.7080°E	07:39		
IF0.5	A tornado lifted umbrellas and other light objects. More info to come.						
IF2	NE of Poznan	Greater Poland	Poland	52.6235°N 17.3922°E	16:45	6.1 km (3.8 mi)	
IF2	A rain-wrapped tornado downed trees and tree branches, damaged a church which gave a child a concussion. A caravan was destroyed. A mobile home was destroyed, and other buildings near Poznan were damaged. Trees were uprooted and lifted, with a 6.1 km path visible from above. Roofs were partially damaged, antennas were blown off, and trees were severely damaged.						

=== September 5 event ===
List of confirmed tornadoes – Saturday, September 5, 2026
EF#	Location	Region	State/Province	Start coord.	Time (UTC)	Path length	Max. width
IFU	SESE of Tuapse	Krasnodar Krai	Russia	43.9287°N 39.3076°E	15:40	Unknown	Unknown
IFU	A landfalling waterspout was observed. A tourist relaxing on the beach was struck but was left unharmed.						

=== September 8 event ===
List of confirmed tornadoes – Tuesday, September 8, 2026
EF#	Location	Region	State/Province	Start coord.	Time (UTC)	Path length	Max. width
IF0	SSW of Haderslev	Haderslev Kommune	Denmark	55.1603°N 9.4343°E	13:45	Unknown	Unknown
IF0	A weak multi-vortex tornado damaged trees.						

=== September 10 event ===
List of confirmed tornadoes – Thursday, September 10, 2026
EF#	Location	Region	State/Province	Start coord.	Time (UTC)	Path length	Max. width
IF1	S of Veiviržėnai	Klaipėda County	Lithuania	55.6109°N 21.5980°E	04:30		
IF1	A tornado damaged and uprooted trees and snapped large branches.						
IF1	Gruzdžiai	Šiauliai County	Lithuania	56.0847°N 23.2149°E	05:27		
IF1	A tornado ripped off roofs, uprooted trees, destroyed greenhouses, and scattered various items around yards.						
IF1.5	NE of Sinalunga	Toscana	Italy	43.2119°N 11.7463°E	12:25		
IF1.5	1 death – A tornado damaged and debranched trees, damaged roofs and a sporting complex, and moved a car. An 82-year-old woman died after bleeding out after being hit by glass shards while trying to cover her windows in her house. More info to come.						
IF1	NE of Cavarzere	Veneto	Italy	45.1602°N 12.1215°E	14:25		
IF1	A large mesocyclonic multi-vortex tornado damaged roofs, trees and power lines.						
IF0.5	SE of Latina	Lazio	Italy	41.2967°N 13.0788°E	16:05		
IF0.5	A tornado damaged greenhouses and snapped large branches.						

=== September 20 event ===
List of confirmed tornadoes – Sunday, September 20, 2026
EF#	Location	Region	State/Province	Start coord.	Time (UTC)	Path length	Max. width
IF1.5	Hvalsø	Lejre Kommune	Denmark	55.5921°N 11.8609°E	17:00	Unknown	Unknown
IF1.5	A tornado damaged roofs, overturned a cart corral, lofted lightweight objects onto roofs of houses, downed trees, and damaged a newly built supermarket by damaging portions of its roof. An outbuilding was deroofed partially.						

=== September 22 event ===
List of confirmed tornadoes – Tuesday, September 22, 2026
EF#	Location	Region	State/Province	Start coord.	Time (UTC)	Path length	Max. width
IF1	E of Francica	Calabria	Italy	38.6171°N 16.1073°E	16:00	Unknown	Unknown
IF1	A tornado ripped off sheet metal out of farming outbuildings roofs and snapped a tree onto a power line.						

=== September 24 event ===
List of confirmed tornadoes – Tuesday, September 24, 2026
EF#	Location	Region	State/Province	Start coord.	Time (UTC)	Path length	Max. width
IFU	N of Vadžgirys	Taurage County	Lithuania	55.2973°N 22.9193°E	18:36	Unknown	Unknown
IFU	A tornado was observed by a local on the highway 10 km (6.2 mi) south of the event, or 4.6 km (2.9 mi) north of Vadžgirys.						

=== September 30 event ===
List of confirmed tornadoes – Wednesday, September 30, 2026
EF#	Location	Region	State/Province	Start coord.	Time (UTC)	Path length	Max. width
IF1.5	S of Rouen	Normandy	France	49.3402°N 1.0802°E	15:00	Unknown	Unknown
IF1.5	A tornado torn off roofs, shattered windows, and damaged 110 houses. A sheet roof was lofted into a garden of a house, factory windows were blown out, vegetation were damaged, large branches downed, one tree was uprooted and broken. In front of a shopping mall, a young woman was knocked to the ground and was injured, sheet metal were downed in the mall, signs and large objects were seen flying around, several other people may have been wounded.						

== October ==
IFU	IF0	IF0.5	IF1	IF1.5	IF2	IF2.5	IF3	IF4	IF5	Total
3	0	0	5	3	0	0	1	0	0	12

=== October 7 event ===
List of confirmed tornadoes – Wednesday, October 7, 2026
EF#	Location	Region	State/Province	Start coord.	Time (UTC)	Path length	Max. width
IF1.5	ESE of Montpelier	Occitania	France	43.5120°N 4.1370°E	03:54	Unknown	Unknown
IF1.5	A tornado benched poles, damaged and uprooted trees, which ended up damaging a car, damaged boats with some of them overturned. Convergent damage tracks occurred, therefore this classifies as a tornado event.						
IFU	SSE of Arles	Occitania	France	43.6262°N 4.7391°E	16:57	Unknown	Unknown
IFU	A tornado was observed.						

=== October 8 event ===
List of confirmed tornadoes – Thursday, October 8, 2026
EF#	Location	Region	State/Province	Start coord.	Time (UTC)	Path length	Max. width
IF1	Viareggio	Toscana	Italy	43.8616°N 10.2654°E	03:15	Unknown	Unknown
IF1	A multi-vortex tornado downed trees and roofs, lofted light objects and severely damaged one roof. A subvortex lifted lightweight roofing material and threw it at an apartment complex, damaging it's walls.						
IF1.5	SS of Florence	Toscana	Italy	43.6055°N 11.1906°E	10:35	Unknown	Unknown
IF1.5	A tornado downed trees, damaged trees branches and trees. A campervan was blown off injuring 2 people.						

=== October 9 event ===
List of confirmed tornadoes – Friday, October 9, 2026
EF#	Location	Region	State/Province	Start coord.	Time (UTC)	Path length	Max. width
IF3	SE of Marsala to Petrosino	Sicily	Italy	37.7162°N 12.4945°E	07:05	Unknown	Unknown
IF3	1 death – A large and intense tornado struck parts of Petrosino. Numerous buildings were damaged, 5 almost destroyed. Numerous cars were lifted and thrown, one was transported 500m away, with it being left unrecognizable. A trailer flew on a roof, a roulette table was thrown, trees were downed or destroyed, powerlines were downed, radio towers were downed, greenhouses and wineyards were destroyed. A school was struck leading to 10 injuries. A couple were injured after their car was blown away onto a field, with the husband dying from their injuries a week later. Overall, one person was killed and 32 people were injured.						
IF1	NW of Mazara del Vallo	Sicily	Italy	37.6876°N 12.5500°E	07:25	Unknown	Unknown
IF1	A tornado damaged sheet metal structures and wineyards.						
IFU	SE of Mazara del Vallo	Sicily	Italy	37.6414°N 12.6069°E	07:29	Unknown	Unknown
IFU	A tornado lifted light debris.						
IF1	SESE of Licata	Sicily	Italy	37.1339°N 13.8810°E	21:50	Unknown	Unknown
IF1	A tornado destroyed greenhouses.						

=== October 13 event ===
List of confirmed tornadoes – Tuesday, October 13, 2026
EF#	Location	Region	State/Province	Start coord.	Time (UTC)	Path length	Max. width
IFU	ESE of Palermo	Sicily	Italy	38.1034°N 13.3967°E	04:35	Unknown	Unknown
IFU	A waterspout made landfall, with no reported damages.						

=== October 21 event ===
List of confirmed tornadoes – Wednesday, October 21, 2026
EF#	Location	Region	State/Province	Start coord.	Time (UTC)	Path length	Max. width
IF1	SE of Bari	Puglia	Italy	41.0462°N 16.9637°E	11:40	Unknown	Unknown
IF1	A tornado lofted plastic sheets around power poles, trees and tree branches and light objects were downed with a cyclonic pattern.						

=== October 23 event ===
List of confirmed tornadoes – Friday, October 23, 2026
EF#	Location	Region	State/Province	Start coord.	Time (UTC)	Path length	Max. width
IF?	Portchester	Hampshire	United Kingdom	50.8478°N 1.1335°E	00:30	Unknown	Unknown
IF?	A tornado was confirmed by TORRO. Rating and damage survey to follow soon.						

=== October 24 event ===
List of confirmed tornadoes – Saturday, October 24, 2026
EF#	Location	Region	State/Province	Start coord.	Time (UTC)	Path length	Max. width
IF1.5	Peschici to Vico del Gargano	Puglia	Italy	41.9057°N 15.9850°E	15:30	Unknown	Unknown
IF1.5	A tornado damaged, snapped and debranched trees and light objects were moved. More trees were damaged, and buildings were also then damaged. A structure was destroyed on a terrace, several roofs were severely damaged too. Debris fell on cars and a barbecue grill was lofted onto a roof.						

=== October 25 event ===
List of confirmed tornadoes – Sunday, October 25, 2026
EF#	Location	Region	State/Province	Start coord.	Time (UTC)	Path length	Max. width
IF1	SE of Heidelberg	Baden-Württemberg	Germany	49.2761°N 8.7791°E	14:55	Unknown	Unknown
IF1	A tornado damaged 2 house roofs with some tiles missing. Trees were uprooted and several branches were snapped. A chain-link fence was pushed to the ground and leaves were deposited in large numbers.						

== November ==
IFU	IF0	IF0.5	IF1	IF1.5	IF2	IF2.5	IF3	IF4	IF5	Total
0	0	1	0	0	0	0	0	0	0	1

=== November 2 event ===
List of confirmed tornadoes – Monday, November 2, 2026
EF#	Location	Region	State/Province	Start coord.	Time (UTC)	Path length	Max. width
IF0.5	EE of Taranto	Puglia	Italy	37.6876°N 12.5500°E	08:17	Unknown	Unknown
IF0.5	A tornado ripped off covering of a beaching facility, moved, blowed, and destroyed light objects.						

== See also ==
- Tornadoes of 2026
- Weather of 2026
  - 2025-26 European windstorm season
- List of European tornadoes and tornado outbreaks
