= Odeigne =

Odeigne Ôdegne (Walloon)
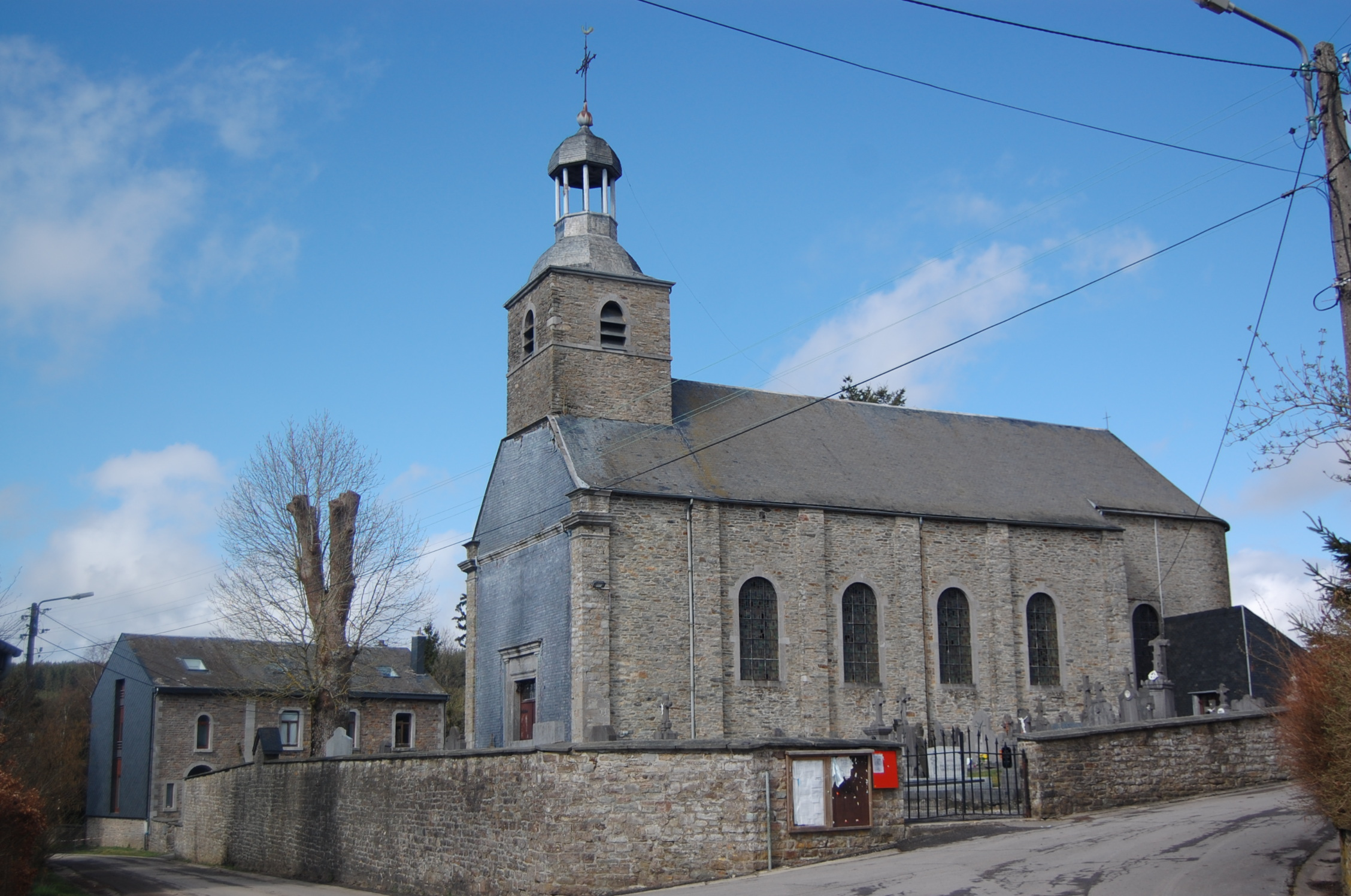
- Odeigne

- Location within Belgium Location within Europe
- Coordinates: 50°15.4′N 05°40.9′E
- Country: Belgium
- Region: Wallonia
- Province: Luxembourg
- Municipality: Manhay

Odeigne (French pronunciation: [ɔdɛɲ]; Walloon: Ôdegne) is a village of Wallonia and a district of the municipality of Manhay, located in the province of Luxembourg, Belgium..

Odeigne is mentioned in written sources as "Aldanias" in 746. Since the Middle Ages, it was a dependence of the abbey of Stavelot, and remained so until the French Revolution. A church has existed in the village since the 9th century, but the presently visible church building dates from 1846. The village mill traces its origins back to at least 1496, and was owned by the prince-bishop of Stavelot, but a mill has probably existed in Odeigne since the 11th century. Close to the village there are two nature reserves, la fagne de Robièfa and la fagne de Nazieufa.
