= Dochamps =

Dochamps Dôtchamp (Walloon)
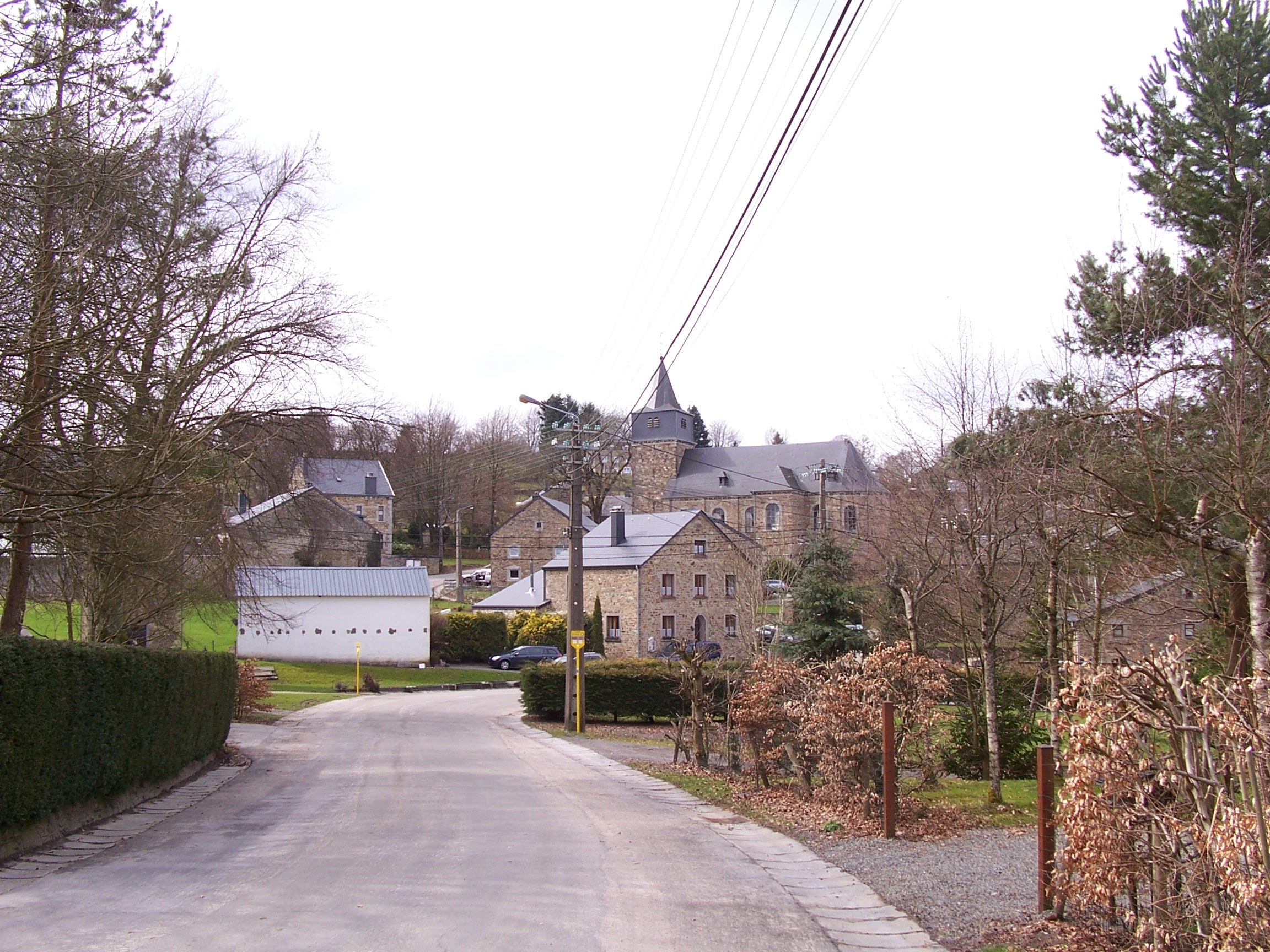
- Dochamps

- Location within Belgium Location within Europe
- Coordinates: 50°14′N 05°37.4′E
- Country: Belgium
- Region: Wallonia
- Province: Luxembourg
- Municipality: Manhay

Dochamps (French pronunciation: [dɔʃɑ̃]; Walloon: Dôtchamp) is a village of Wallonia and a district of the municipality of Manhay, located in the province of Luxembourg, Belgium.

The earliest mention of the village is from 1011, but there appears to have been an earlier Viking settlement here for some time. Its remains were destroyed in the 1612 by Huguenots. In 1642 the village was pillaged and destroyed by Dutch Calvinist troops. Several of the villagers were burnt to death inside the church tower, while others escaped to a nearby forest and later rebuilt the village. In 1944, during the Battle of the Bulge, the village was again damaged by war. The church of the village has foundations from the 12th century but largely dates from the 17th century when it was rebuilt after the sack of the village. It was restored again after World War II.
