= Church of Saint Nicholas, Svir =

Church in Minsk Region, Belarus

Coordinates: 54°51′11″N 26°23′46″E

Church of Saint Nicholas in Svir
- Касцёл Святога Мікалая
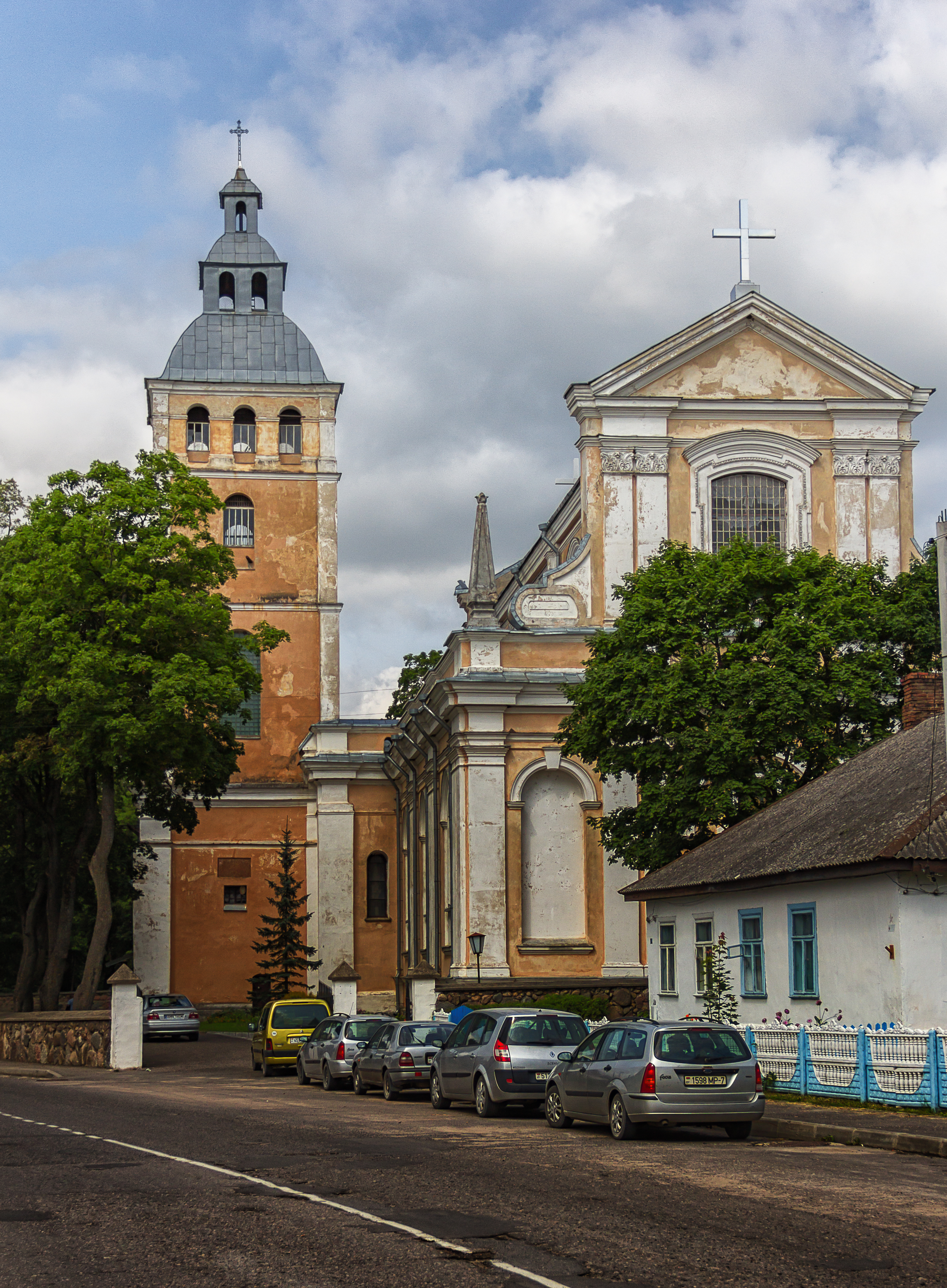
- Church of Saint Nicholas in Svir
- Location: Svir, Belarus
- Country: Belarus
- Denomination: Roman Catholic church

Architecture
- Years built: 1653, 1903–1908

Administration
- Diocese: Archdiocese of Minsk–Mohilev

The Church of Saint Nicholas (Belarusian: Касцёл Святога Мікалая) is a Catholic church in Svir, Minsk Region, Belarus. It was built in 1653, then destroyed during the Russo-Polish War of 1654–1667.

== History ==
=== Grand Duchy of Lithuania ===
According to records, the first donations for the altar in Svir were made as early as in 1411 by the local Count Petr Petkovich Svirsky. In 1452 the wooden church was built by order of Ivan Svirsky. The church received 100 ha (250 acres) of croplands, Lake Tusha with a mill and several villages. On August 1, 1472, the nephew of Ivan Svirsky, Senka Romanovich, donated money to build a new altar in the church. In 1490 and 1503 more generous donations were made by local noble families.

=== Polish–Lithuanian Commonwealth ===
In 1577 Count Jan Bolesławowicz Świrski, a Calvinist, established a Calvinist parish in the church. In 1598 the Jesuits sued the local Calvinists and got back all the church's property. In 1644 they started the construction of a new stone church. It was consecrated in 1653 but soon destroyed in the Russo-Polish war of 1654–1667.

=== 20th century ===
Between 1903 and 1908, the new church was constructed on the site of the destroyed one. The National Historic Archive of Belarus has documents dated 1923–1940 regarding births, deaths, and weddings. The Soviet authorities closed the church on March 4, 1961, and dismantled the pipe organ. In 1981 a branch of the Smorgon factory occupied the building. On May 31, 1982, four crosses were taken off the church. In 1985 three church bells were sold for scrap. The parish managed to save one of the bells, which is currently displayed near the church.
