= Grandménil =

Grandménil Grand-Mayni-e-l'-Årdene (Walloon)
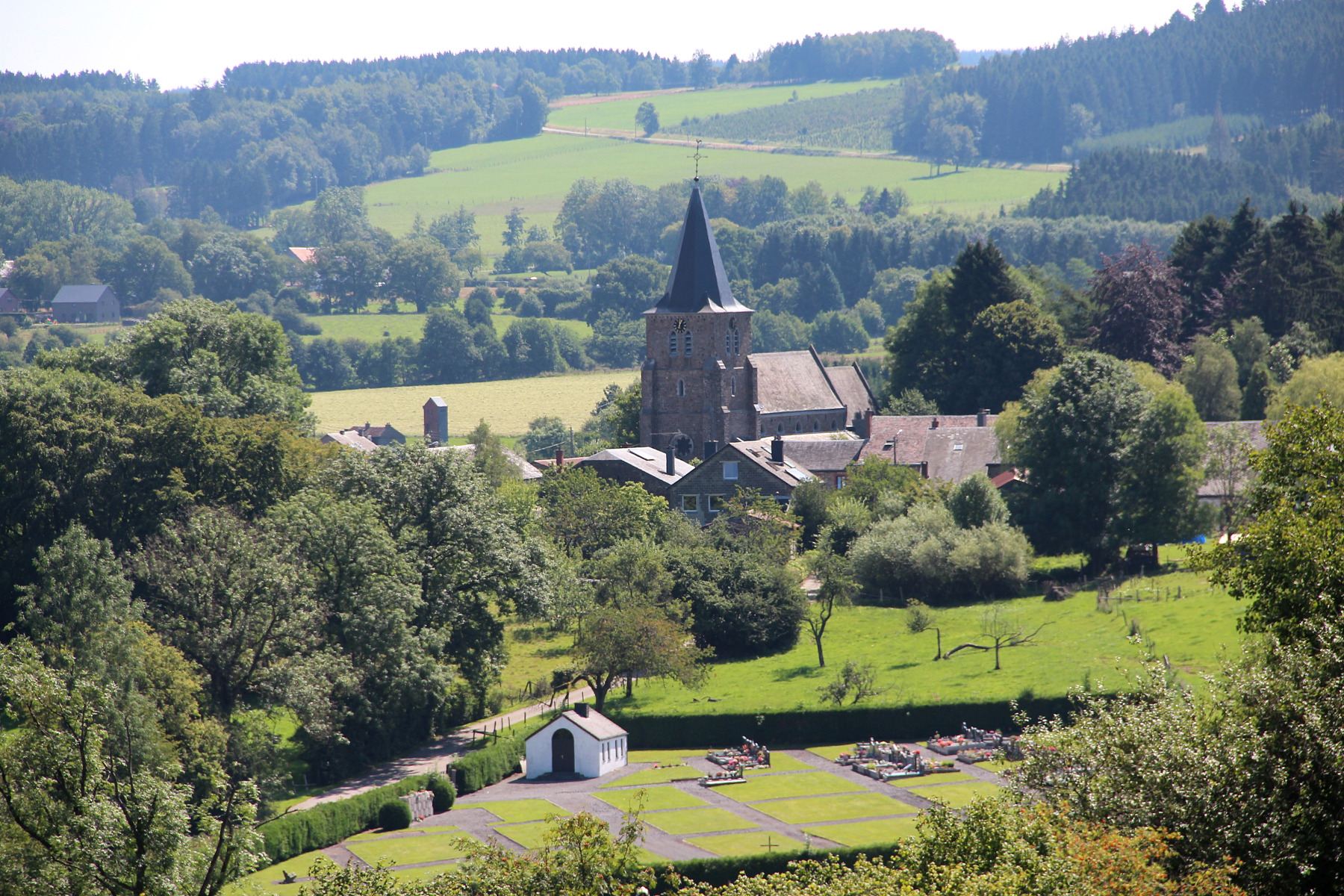
- Grandménil

- Location within Belgium Location within Europe
- Coordinates: 50°17′N 05°39′E
- Country: Belgium
- Region: Wallonia
- Province: Luxembourg
- Municipality: Manhay

Grandménil (Walloon: Grand-Mayni-e-l'-Årdene) is a village of Wallonia and a district of the municipality of Manhay, located in the province of Luxembourg, Belgium.

During the Battle of the Bulge of World War II, a fight between American units and elements of the 2nd SS Panzer Division Das Reich took place in Grandménil on Christmas night. The next day the German troops retreated and the village was re-captured by American troops.
