= Petrosino =

Petrosino Petrosèlinos (Greek)
- Comune
- Comune di Petrosino
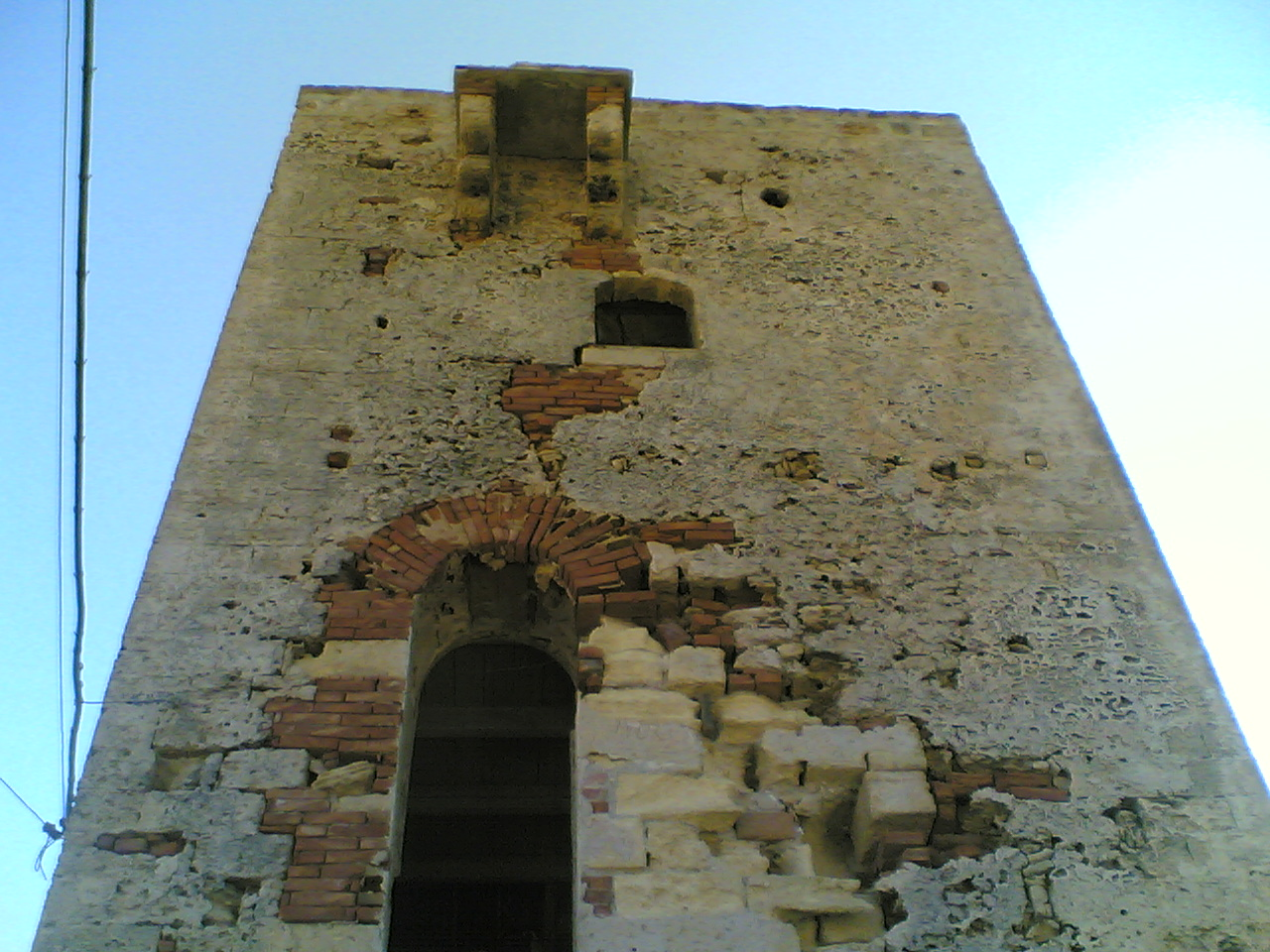
- The Sibiliana Tower

- Location within Italy Location within Sicily
- Coordinates: 37°43′N 12°29′E
- Country: Italy
- Region: Sicily
- Province: Trapani (TP)

Government
  - Mayor: Giacomo Anastasi (since 12 June 2022)

Area
  - Total: 44 km^{2} (17 sq mi)
- Elevation: 16 m (52 ft)

Population (31 December 2004)
  - Total: 7,458
  - Density: 170/km^{2} (440/sq mi)
- Demonym: Petrosinesi
- Time zone: UTC+1 (CET)
  - Summer (DST): UTC+2 (CEST)
- Postal code: 91020
- Dialing code: 0923
- Patron saint: St. Mary of the Graces
- Saint day: 31 May
- Website: Official website

Petrosino (Sicilian: Pitrusinu) is a town and comune in Sicily, Italy. It is administered by the province of Trapani, located between the municipalities of Marsala and Mazara del Vallo.

== 2026 tornado outbreak ==
On October 9th, a large tornado and waterspout outbreak occurred in western Sicily, impacting multiple cities near Petrosino. An intense tornado struck the area, but as of October 11 and further on, the tornado hasn't been given much media coverage to share and hasn't been given a rating.
