= List of protected heritage sites in Manhay =

This table shows an overview of the protected heritage sites in the Walloon town Manhay. This list is part of Belgium's national heritage.

Object	Year/architect	Town/section	Address	Coordinates	Number^{?}	Image
Church of Saints-Pierre-et-Paul ^{(nl)} ^{(fr)}		Manhay		50.234691°N 5.622271°E	83055-CLT-0001-01 Info	
Chapel du Carrefour from the 17th century ^{(nl)} ^{(fr)}		Manhay	rue Hautva, devant le n° 19	50.301722°N 5.698331°E	83055-CLT-0002-01 Info	
A remarkable maple tree and oak tree located on either side of the house ^{(nl)} ^{(fr)}		Manhay	Gran-Rue 2, te Manhay (Grandménil)	50.288462°N 5.653922°E	83055-CLT-0004-01 Info	

== See also ==
- List of protected heritage sites in Luxembourg (Belgium)
- Manhay
