= Vaux-Chavanne =

Vaux-Chavanne Li Vå-d'-Xhavane (Walloon)
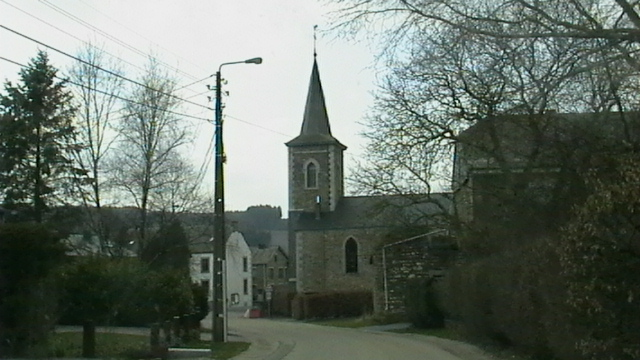
- Vaux-Chavanne

- Location within Belgium Location within Europe
- Coordinates: 50°18′N 05°41′E
- Country: Belgium
- Region: Wallonia
- Province: Luxembourg
- Municipality: Manhay

Vaux-Chavanne (Walloon: Li Vå-d'-Xhavane) is a village of Wallonia and a district of the municipality of Manhay, located in the province of Luxembourg, Belgium.

The town centre of Manhay is located in Vaux-Chavanne.

During the Middle Ages, the village was owned by the lords of Durbuy. The village church dates from 1865 and is in a Gothic Revival style.
