= Połomia =

Połomia may refer to the following places:

- Połomia, Tarnowskie Góry County in Silesian Voivodeship (south Poland)
- Połomia, Dębica County in Subcarpathian Voivodeship (south-east Poland)
- Połomia, Strzyżów County in Subcarpathian Voivodeship (south-east Poland)
- Połomia, Wodzisław County in Silesian Voivodeship (south Poland)
