= Manhay =

Municipality in Wallonia, Belgium

Manhay Manhé (Walloon)
- Municipality
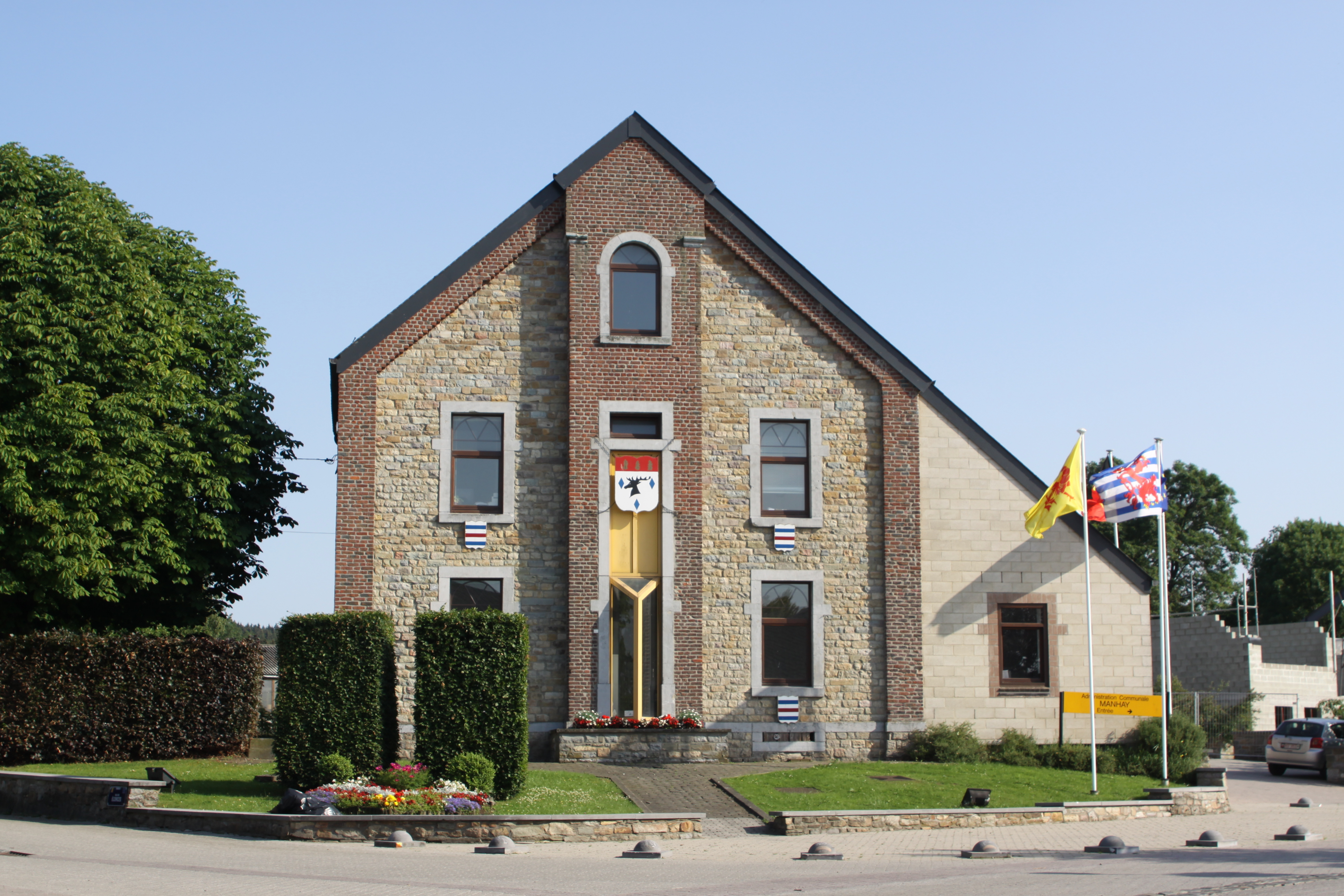
- Manhay town hall

- Flag Coat of arms

- Location of Manhay in Luxembourg province
- Interactive map of Manhay
- Location in Belgium
- Coordinates: 50°18′N 05°40′E
- Country: Belgium
- Community: French Community
- Region: Wallonia
- Province: Luxembourg
- Arrondissement: Marche-en-Famenne

Government
  - Mayor: Geoffrey Huet
  - Governing party: AvecVousManhay

Area
  - Total: 120.18 km^{2} (46.40 sq mi)

Population (2018-01-01)
  - Total: 3,463
  - Density: 28.82/km^{2} (74.63/sq mi)
- Postal codes: 6960
- NIS code: 83055
- Area codes: 086
- Website: (in French) manhay.be

Manhay (French pronunciation: [manɛ]; Walloon: Manhé) is a municipality of Wallonia located in the province of Luxembourg, Belgium.

On 1 January 2007 the municipality, which covers 119.81 km^{2}, had 3,185 inhabitants, giving a population density of 26.6 inhabitants per km^{2}.

The municipality consists of the following districts: Dochamps, Grandménil, Harre, Malempré, Odeigne and Vaux-Chavanne (town centre).

== See also ==
- List of protected heritage sites in Manhay
