= Fülesd =

Coordinates: 48°01′N 22°41′E

- Interactive map of Fülesd
- Country: Hungary
- County: Szabolcs-Szatmár-Bereg

Area
  - Total: 15.05 km^{2} (5.81 sq mi)

Population (2015)
  - Total: 449
  - Density: 29.9/km^{2} (77/sq mi)
- Time zone: UTC+1 (CET)
  - Summer (DST): UTC+2 (CEST)
- Postal code: 4964
- Area code: 44

Location of Szabolcs-Szatmar-Bereg county in Hungary

Fülesd is a village in Szabolcs-Szatmár-Bereg county, in the Northern Great Plain region of eastern Hungary.

== Geography ==
It covers an area of 15.05 km^{2} (6 sq mi) and has a population of 449 people (2015).
