= Regina Maria, Soroca =

Regina Maria
- Commune
- Interactive map of Regina Maria
- Country: Moldova
- Elevation: 181 m (594 ft)

Population (2014)
  - Total: 674
- Time zone: UTC+2 (EET)
  - Summer (DST): UTC+3 (EEST)
- Postal code: MD-3033

Regina Maria is a commune in Soroca District, Moldova. It is composed of two villages, Lugovoe and Regina Maria.
