= Nerimdaičiai =

- Town
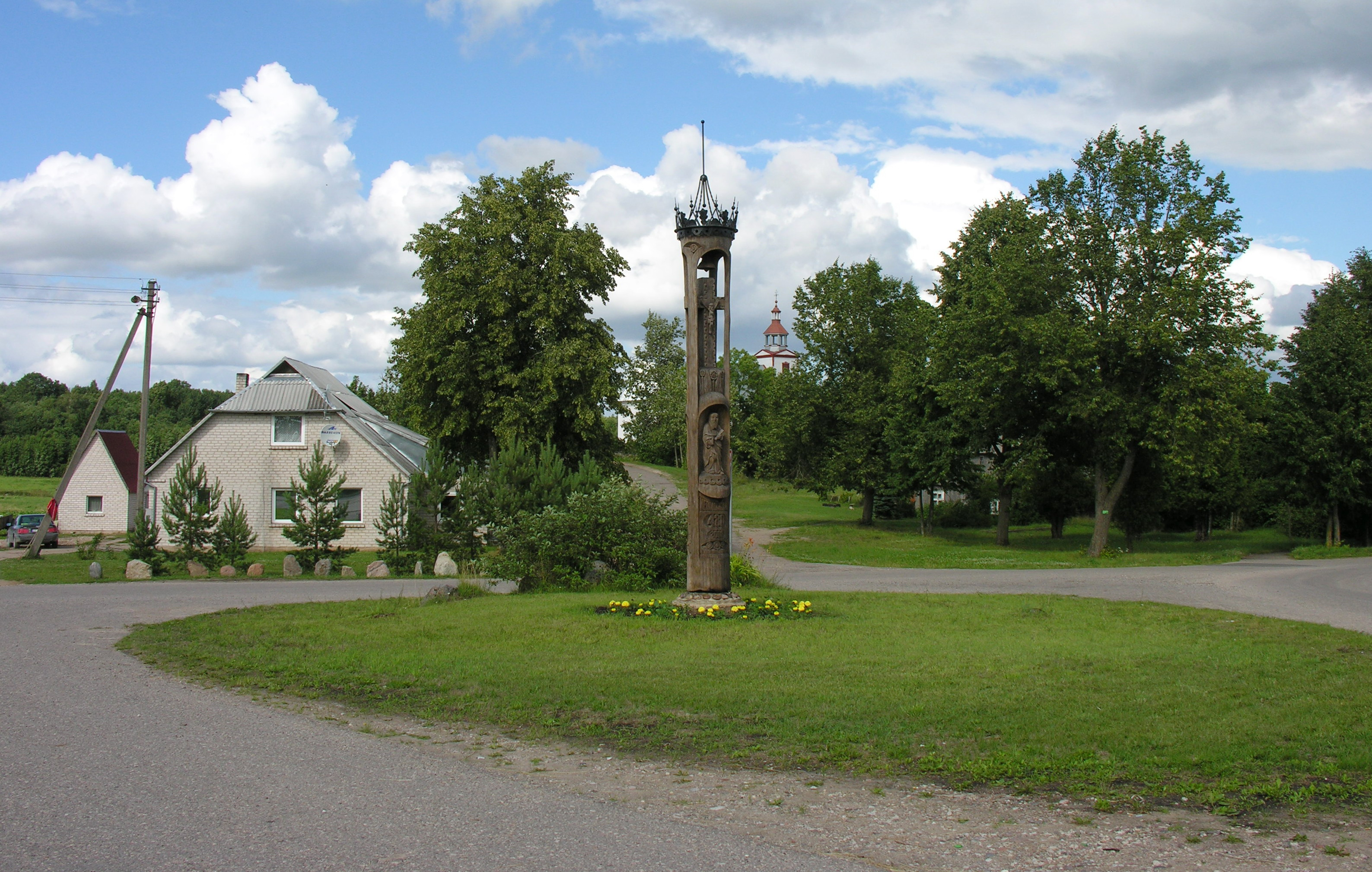

- Location within Lithuania
- Coordinates: 56°4′59″N 22°24′22″E
- Country: Lithuania
- County: Telšiai County
- Municipality: Telšiai district municipality
- Eldership: Nevarėnai eldership

Population (2011)
  - Total: 281
- Time zone: UTC+2 (EET)
  - Summer (DST): UTC+3 (EEST)

Nerimdaičiai (Samogitian: Nerėmdātē, Polish: Nierymdajcie) is a town in Telšiai County, Lithuania. According to the 2011 census, the town has a population of 281 people.
