= Veiviržėnai =

- Town
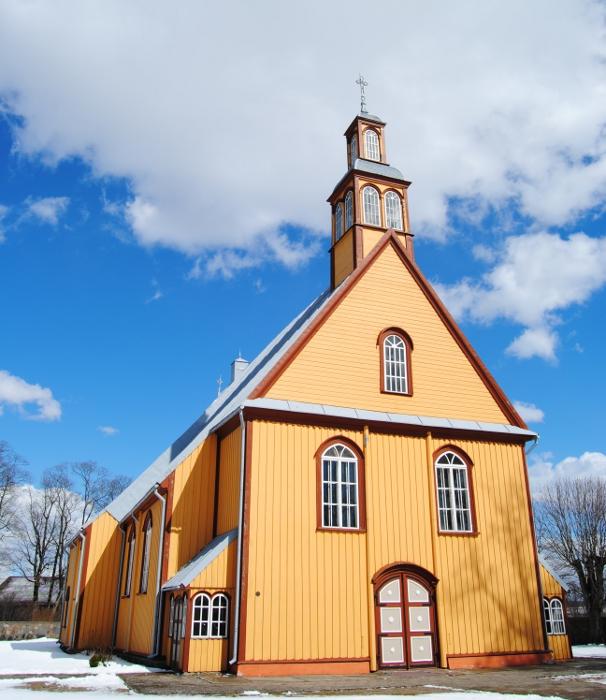
- Church of St. Matthew in Veiviržėnai

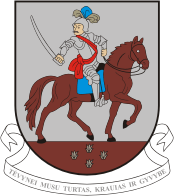
- Coat of arms

- Location within Lithuania
- Coordinates: 55°36′10″N 21°35′30″E
- Country: Lithuania
- County: Klaipėda County

Population (2011)
  - Total: 840
- Time zone: UTC+2 (EET)
  - Summer (DST): UTC+3 (EEST)

Veiviržėnai (Polish: Wewirzany) is a small town in Klaipėda County, in northwestern Lithuania, in the historic region of Samogitia. According to the 2011 census, the town has a population of 840 people.

== History ==
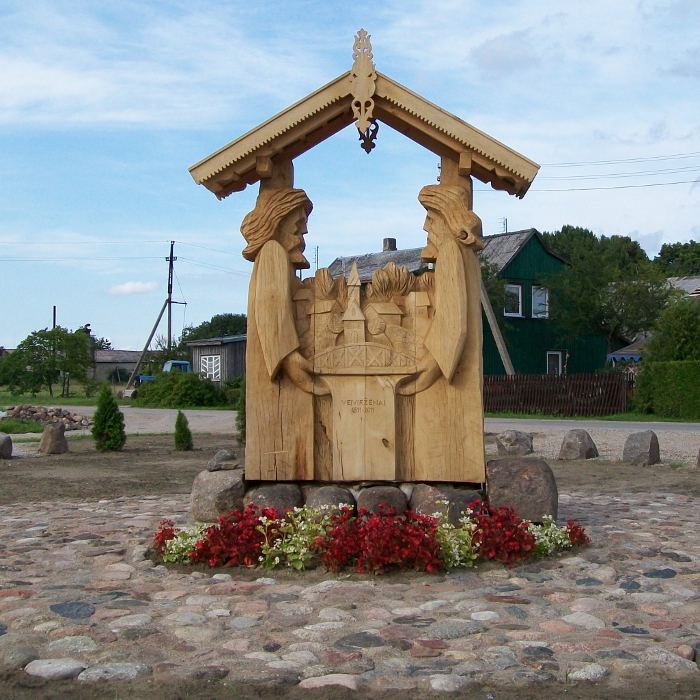
Monument built to commemorate 500 years Veiviržėnai jubilee

During World War II, it was first occupied by the Soviet Union from 1940, then by Nazi Germany from 1941, and then by the Soviet Union again from 1944. In September 1941, 300-400 Jewish women and children were murdered in Veiviržėnai by Germans and Lithuanian collaborators. The Jewish men were already murdered in July 1941, women were kept in the summer in forced labor for local farmers. The priest helped by the mayor tried to stop the massacre but were unsuccessful in stopping the massacre.
