= Svir, Belarus =

Urban-type settlement in Minsk Region, Belarus

Svir Сьвір (Belarusian) Svieriai
- Urban-type settlement
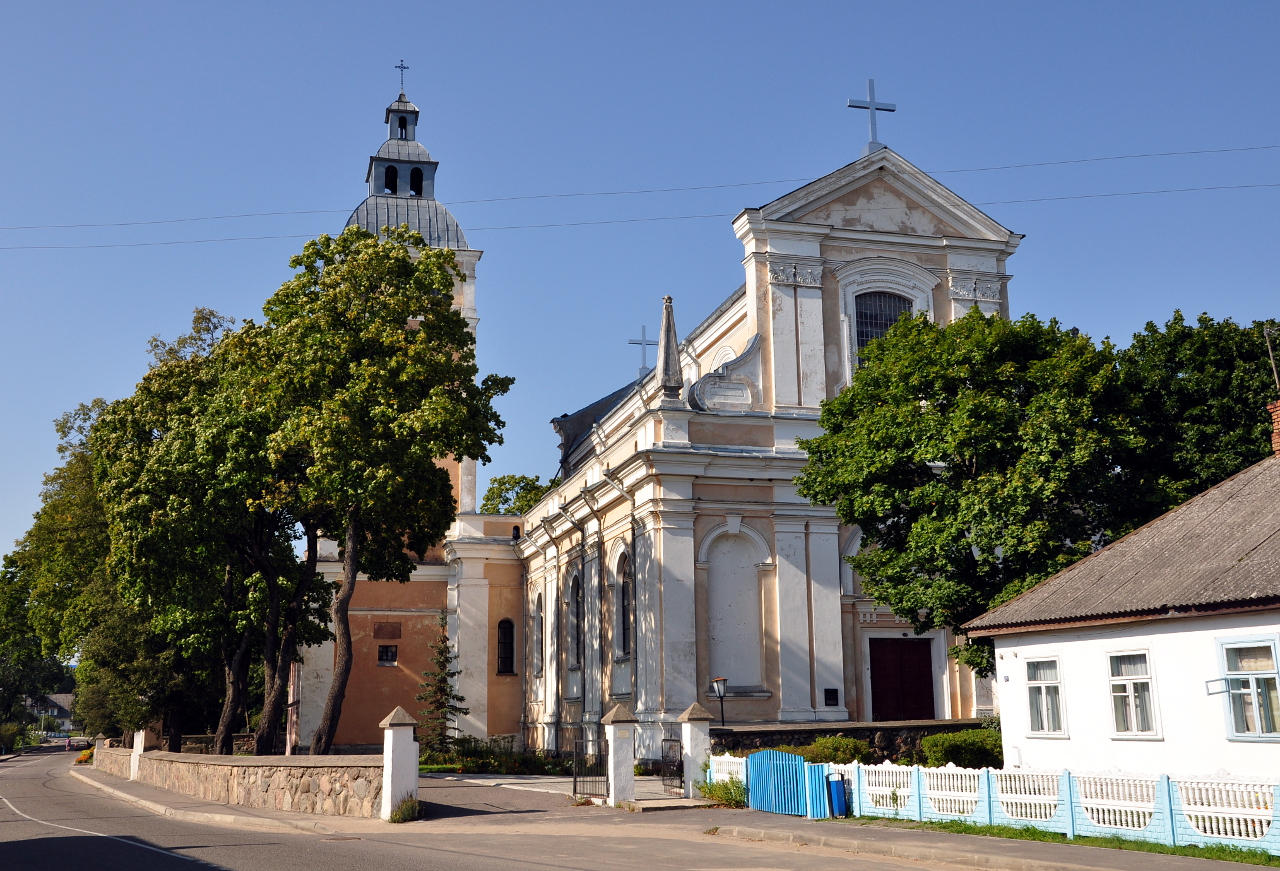

- Location within Belarus
- Coordinates: 54°49′N 26°24′E
- Country: Belarus
- Region: Minsk Region
- District: Myadzyel District
- Founded: 13th century
- Elevation: 153 m (502 ft)

Population (2026)
  - Total: 896
- Time zone: UTC+3 (MSK)
- Postal code: 222387

Svir (Note: Belarusian: Сьвір; Russian: Свирь; Lithuanian: Svieriai; Polish: Świr.) is an urban-type settlement in Myadzyel District, Minsk Region, Belarus. As of 2026, it has a population of 896.

== History ==
It is believed to have been founded in the 13th century by the Lithuanian duke Daumantas and was part of the Grand Duchy of Lithuania until the Third Partition of Poland in 1795.

The mound in the town has remains of fortifications from the 14th to 16th centuries.

In the 18th to 19th centuries, the Lithuanians in Svir and its vicinities were Slavicized.

== Gallery ==
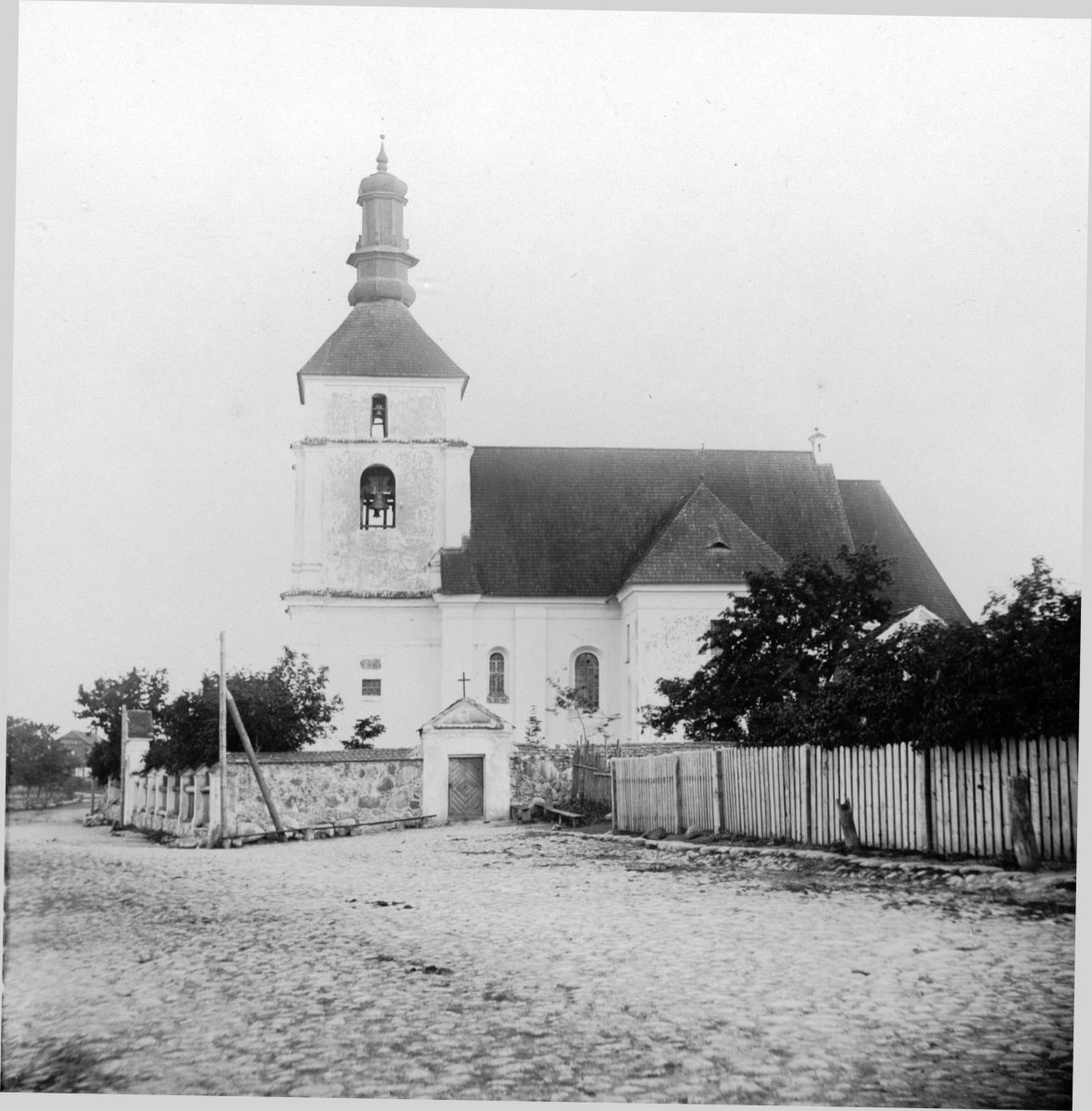
Market square in 1900

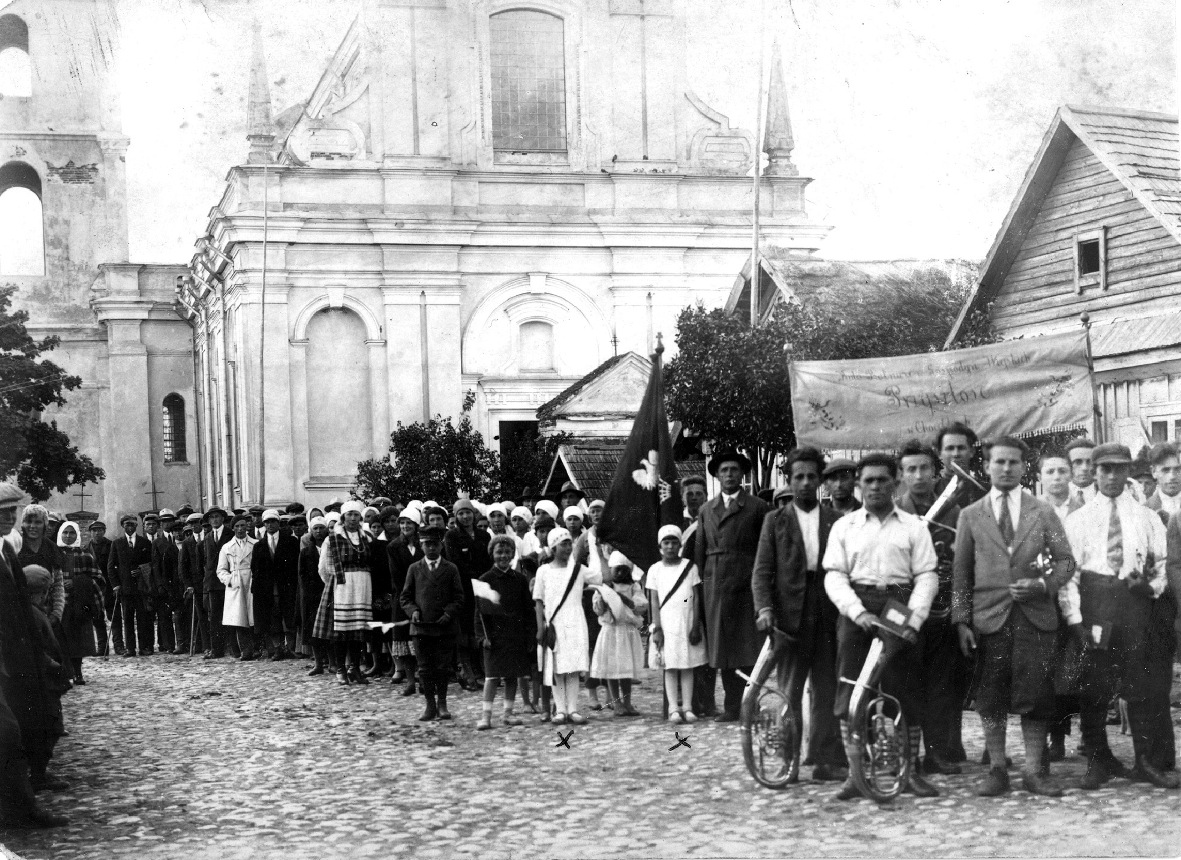
Town celebration in 1931

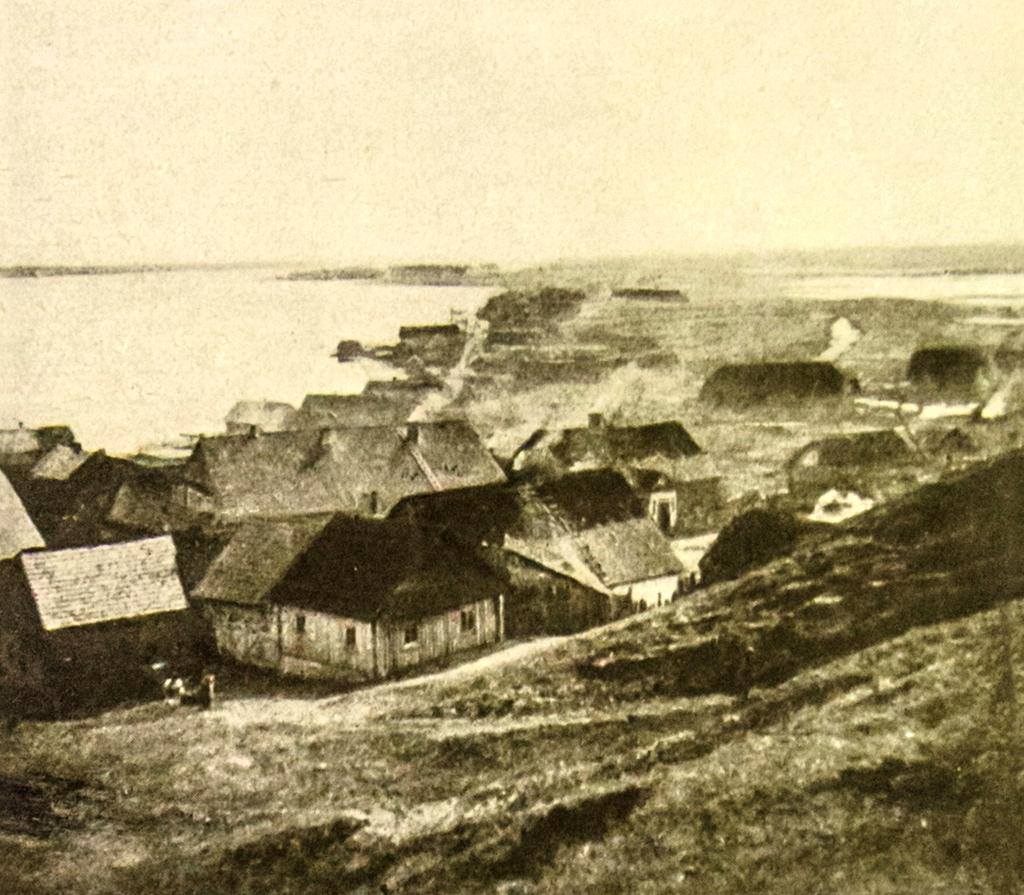
Town during World War I

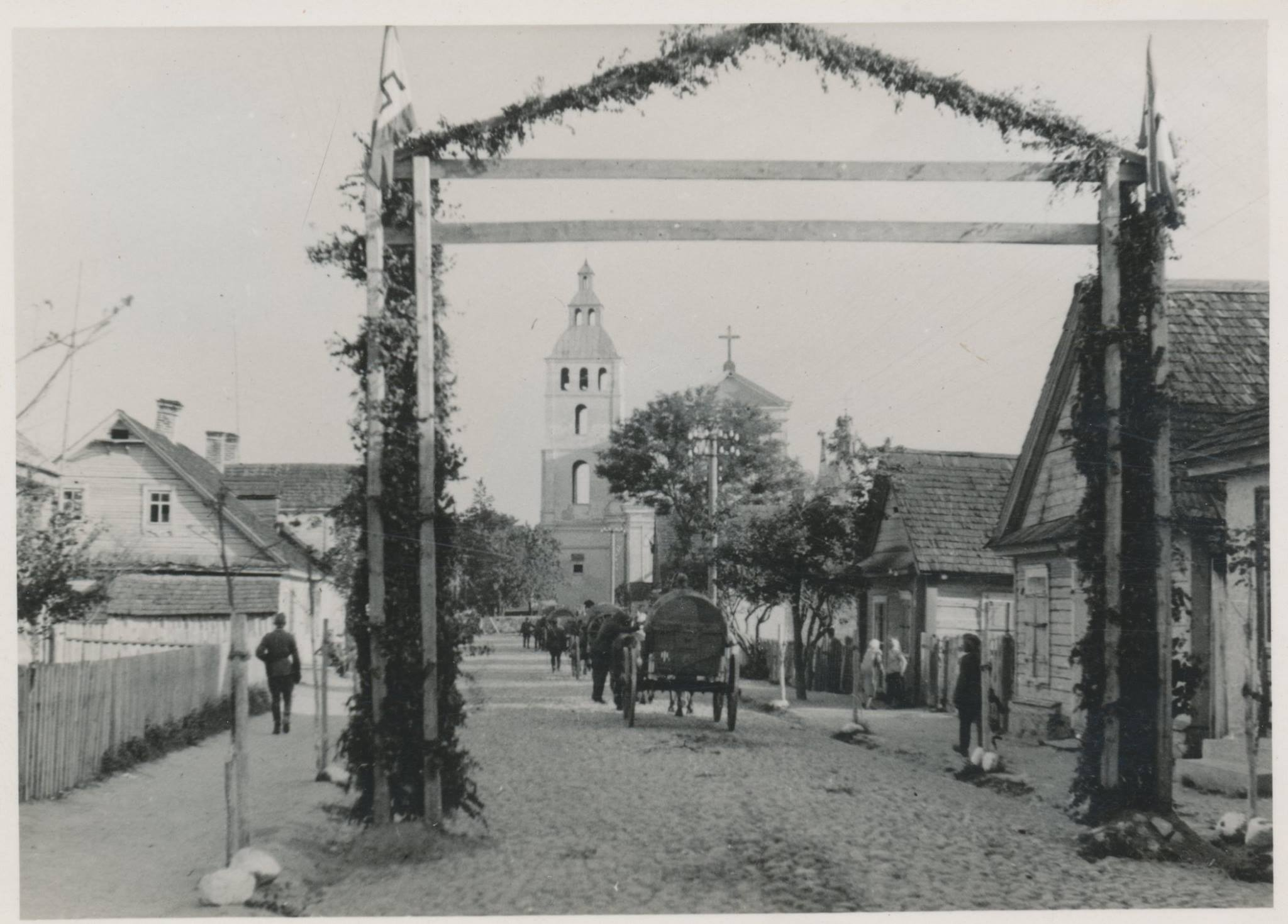
One of the Svir's streets in 1941

== See also ==
- Church of Saint Nicholas, Svir
