= Końcewo =

- Village
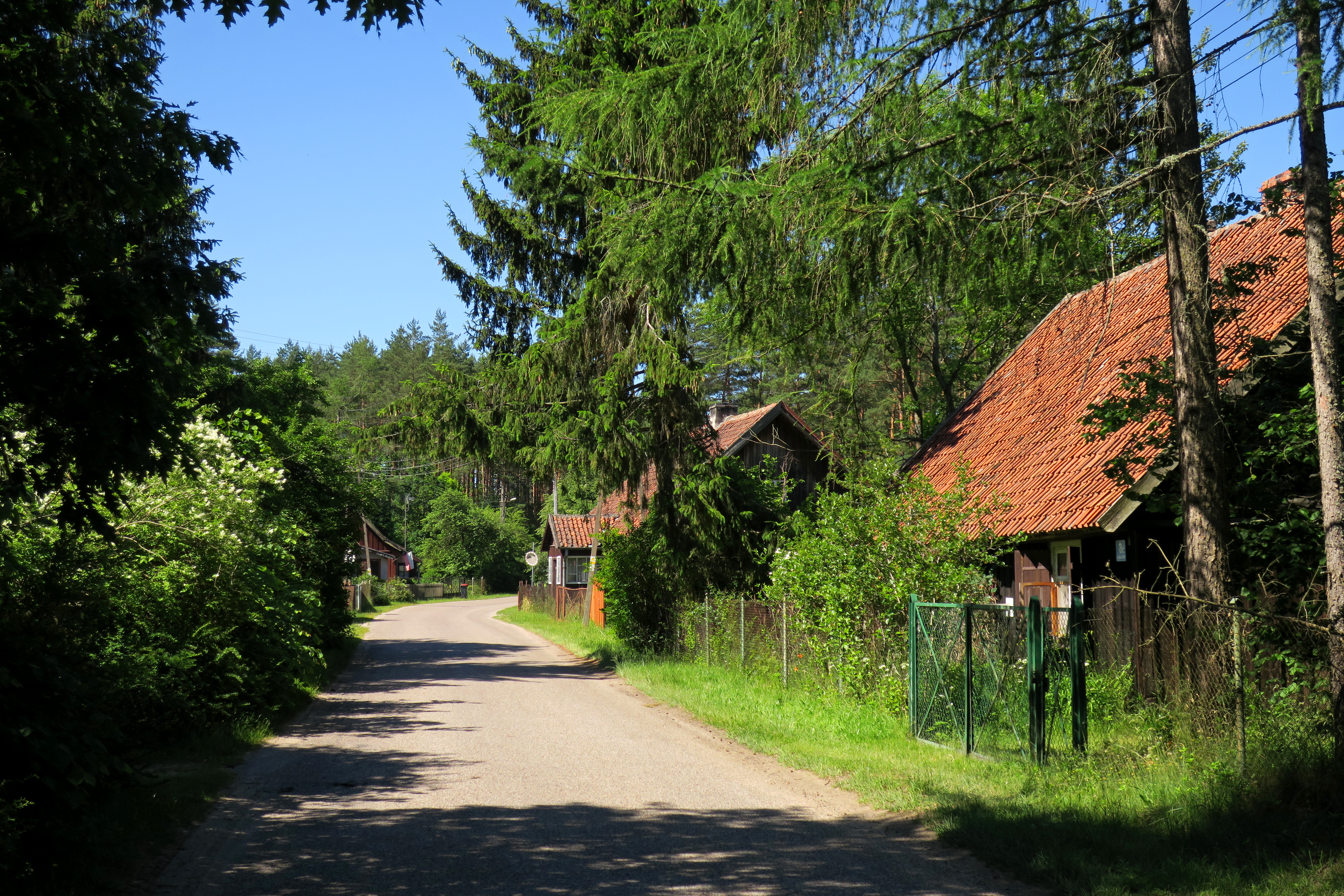

- Location within Poland
- Coordinates: 53°41′25″N 21°39′0″E
- Country: Poland
- Voivodeship: Warmian-Masurian
- County: Pisz
- Gmina: Ruciane-Nida
- Population (2021): 71

Końcewo [kɔɲˈt͡sɛvɔ] (German: Konzewen) is a village in the administrative district of Gmina Ruciane-Nida, within Pisz County, Warmian-Masurian Voivodeship, in northern Poland. It is a sołectwo of Ruciane-Nida.

In 2021, the village had a population of 71.

== Transport ==
Końcewo lies on a road that links it to Wejsuny, Głodowo, Niedźwiedzi Róg, and Lipnik.

== History ==
The region has ties to the historical Bogaczewo culture of the Western Baltic culture. Archaeologists have excavated 25 graves from that period (c. 1st millennium B.C. to the end of the 4th century A.D.) in or near the village.

Before the 13th century, the region surrounding present day Końcewo was inhabited by Baltic Prussians and was known as Galindia. Following the Prussian Crusade it was conquered by the Teutonic Knights and became part of the Monastic State of the Teutonic Order. After the secularization of the Teutonic Order in 1525, the region became part of Ducal Prussia, which was established as a vassal state of the Crown of the Kingdom of Poland. Beginning in the 15th century, many Polish settlers (called Mazurs) from the Mazovia region of Poland, moved into the southern parts of the duchy (later known as the Mazury region). Areas that had large numbers of Polish language speakers were known as the Polish Departments. In 1657, the duchy passed under the full sovereignty of Brandenburg. Until 1945, Końcewo was part of the Prussian and then German region of East Prussia, under the name of Konzewen. In 1938 under the Third Reich the name was changed to Warnold. It had 263 inhabitants in 1885, 371 in 1933, and 373 in 1939.

Other historical spelling variants for the village include Kończewo and Kontzewen.
