= Bemowo Piskie =

- Village
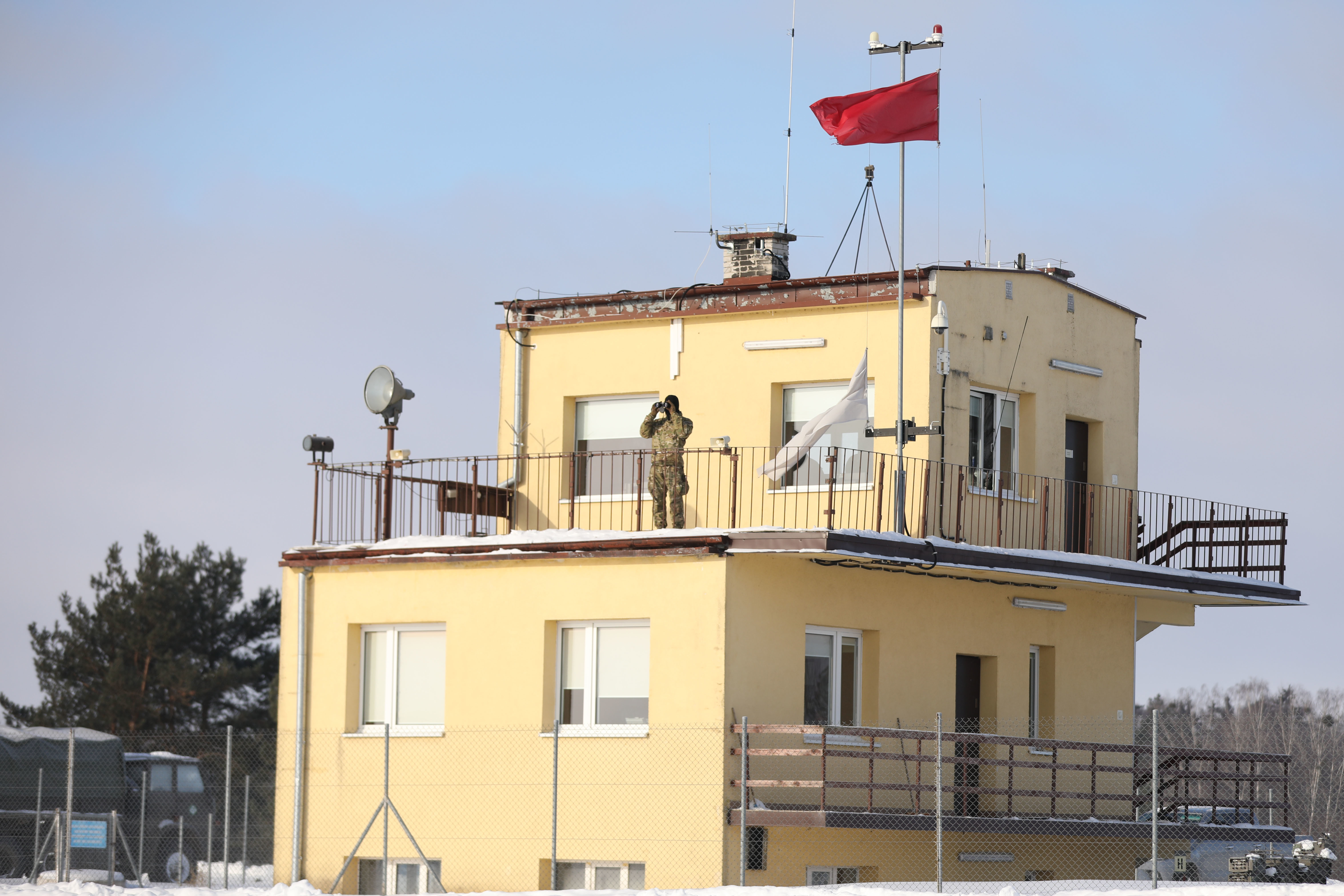
- U.S. Army Soldier at a tower at the NATO Training Base in Bemowo Piskie

- Location within Poland
- Coordinates: 53°44′N 22°3′E
- Country: Poland
- Voivodeship: Warmian-Masurian
- County: Pisz
- Gmina: Biała Piska
- Founded: 1561

Population
  - Total: 1,300
- Time zone: UTC+1 (CET)
  - Summer (DST): UTC+2 (CEST)
- Vehicle registration: NPI
- Website: http://www.bemowopiskie.yoyo.pl

Bemowo Piskie [bɛˈmɔvɔ ˈpʲiskʲɛ] is a village in the administrative district of Gmina Biała Piska, within Pisz County, Warmian-Masurian Voivodeship, in north-eastern Poland. It is located in the historic region of Masuria.

== History ==
The village was established in 1561, when Andrzej Szlaga founded an inn at the site. In the past the village was also known to the local Polish Masurian populace as Szlaga (after its founder) or Karczmisko (after the Polish word karczma, which means "inn"). From the early 18th century it was part of the Kingdom of Prussia, and from 1871 to 1945 it was also part of Germany, administratively located in the province of East Prussia. After the defeat of Nazi Germany in World War II in 1945, the village along with Masuria became again part of Poland. In 1955, the village was renamed from Karczmisko to Bemowo Piskie.

== NATO Training Base ==
Bemowo Piskie is the site of the NATO Enhanced Forward Presence battlegroup training base in Poland.
