= Rogale Wielkie =

- Village
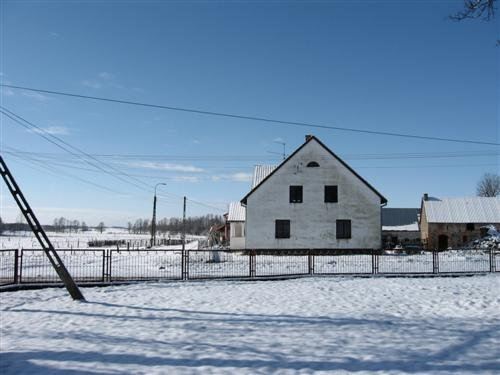
- File:Rogale Wielkie

- Location within Poland
- Coordinates: 53°38′N 22°15′E
- Country: Poland
- Voivodeship: Warmian-Masurian
- County: Pisz
- Gmina: Biała Piska
- Population: 120

Rogale Wielkie [rɔˈɡalɛ ˈvʲɛlkʲɛ] (German: Groß Rogallen) is a village in the administrative district of Gmina Biała Piska, within Pisz County, Warmian-Masurian Voivodeship, in northern Poland.

The village has a population of 120.
