= Bełcząc, Warmian-Masurian Voivodeship =

Bełcząc
- Village
- Location within Poland
- Coordinates: 53°35′N 22°4′E
- Country: Poland
- Voivodeship: Warmian-Masurian
- County: Pisz
- Gmina: Biała Piska
- Population: 170

Bełcząc [ˈbɛu̯t͡ʂɔnt͡s] is a village in the administrative district of Gmina Biała Piska, within Pisz County, Warmian-Masurian Voivodeship, in northern Poland.
