= Osiniak-Piotrowo =

- Village
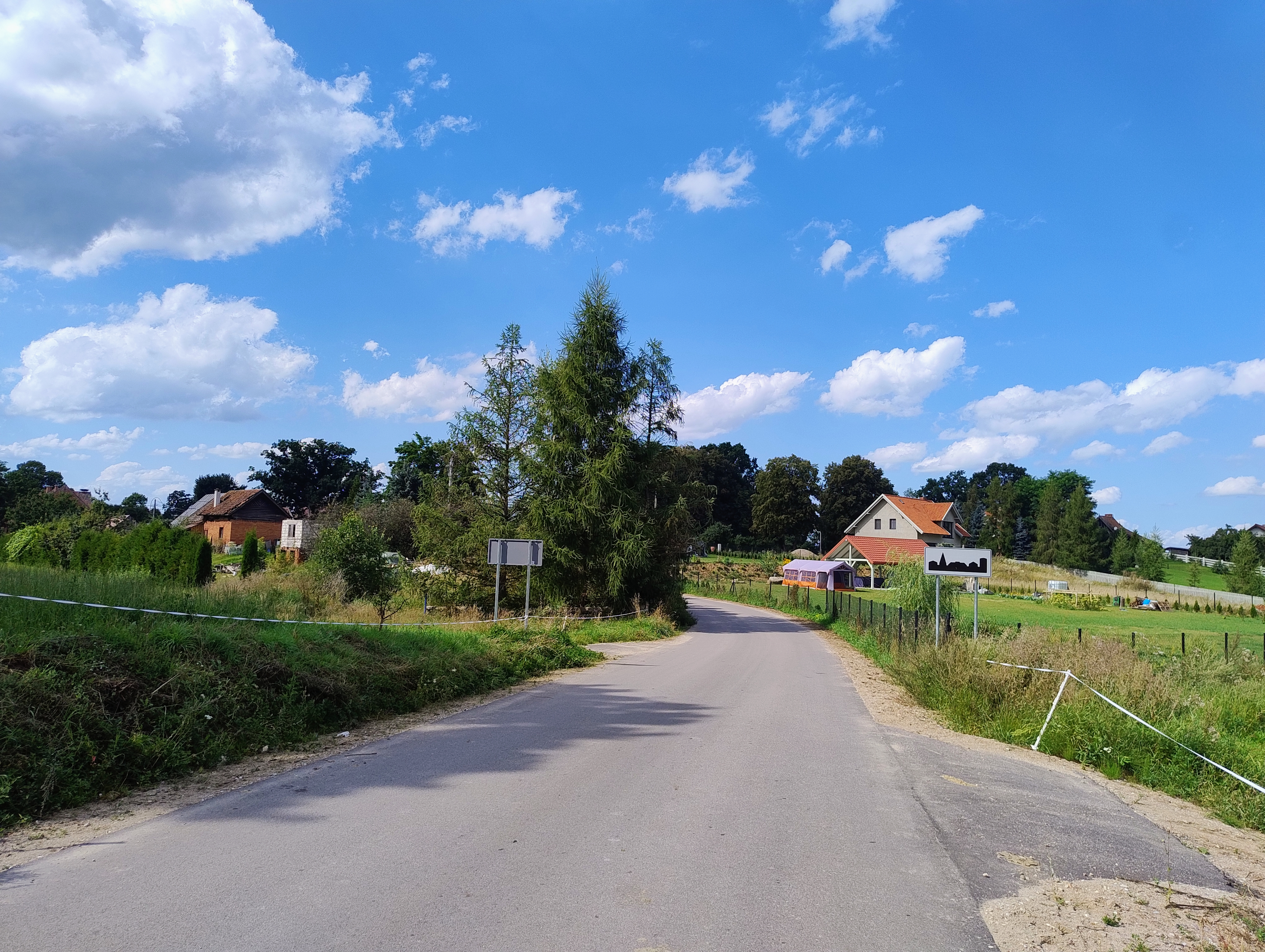

- Location within Poland
- Coordinates: 53°39′N 21°30′E
- Country: Poland
- Voivodeship: Warmian-Masurian
- County: Pisz
- Gmina: Ruciane-Nida
- Population (2022): 171

Osiniak-Piotrowo [ɔˈɕiɲak pjɔˈtrɔvɔ] is a village in the administrative district of Gmina Ruciane-Nida, within Pisz County, Warmian-Masurian Voivodeship, in northern Poland.
