= Świdry, Pisz County =

Świdry
- Village
- Location within Poland
- Coordinates: 53°34′34″N 22°10′52″E
- Country: Poland
- Voivodeship: Warmian-Masurian
- County: Pisz
- Gmina: Biała Piska
- Population: 310

Świdry (Polish: [ˈɕfidrɨ]; German: Schwiddern) is a village in the administrative district of Gmina Biała Piska, within Pisz County, Warmian-Masurian Voivodeship, in northern Poland.

The village has a population of 310.
