= Wypad =

- Settlement
- Location within Poland
- Coordinates: 53°41′51″N 21°30′58″E
- Country: Poland
- Voivodeship: Warmian-Masurian
- County: Pisz
- Gmina: Ruciane-Nida
- Population: 5

Wypad [ˈvɨpat] (German: Wypad (1938-45:Waldsiedeln)) is a settlement in the administrative district of Gmina Ruciane-Nida, within Pisz County, Warmian-Masurian Voivodeship, in northern Poland.

The settlement has a population of 5.
