= Ruczaj =

Ruczaj may refer to the following places in Poland:

- Ruczaj, Warmian-Masurian Voivodeship
- Osiedle Ruczaj, a housing estate in the Dębniki district of Kraków
