= Szkody-Kolonia =

- Settlement
- Location within Poland
- Coordinates: 53°36′36″N 22°03′36″E
- Country: Poland
- Voivodeship: Warmian-Masurian
- County: Pisz
- Gmina: Biała Piska

Szkody-Kolonia [ˈʂkɔdɨ kɔˈlɔɲa] (German: Friedensruh) is a settlement in the administrative district of Gmina Biała Piska, within Pisz County Warmian-Masurian Voivodeship, in Northern Poland.
