= Oko, Warmian-Masurian Voivodeship =

Oko
- Settlement
- Location within Poland
- Coordinates: 53°35′13″N 21°32′42″E
- Country: Poland
- Voivodeship: Warmian-Masurian
- County: Pisz
- Gmina: Ruciane-Nida
- Population: 20

Oko [ˈɔkɔ] is a settlement in the administrative district of Gmina Ruciane-Nida, within Pisz County, Warmian-Masurian Voivodeship, in northern Poland.
