= Pawłocin =

- Village
- Location within Poland
- Coordinates: 53°37′N 22°8′E
- Country: Poland
- Voivodeship: Warmian-Masurian
- County: Pisz
- Gmina: Biała Piska
- Population: 80

Pawłocin [paˈvwɔt͡ɕin] (German: Paulshagen) is a village in the administrative district of Gmina Biała Piska, within Pisz County, Warmian-Masurian Voivodeship, in northern Poland.

The village has a population of 80.
