= Pieczysko =

- Settlement
- Location within Poland
- Coordinates: 53°35′57″N 21°39′56″E
- Country: Poland
- Voivodeship: Warmian-Masurian
- County: Pisz
- Gmina: Ruciane-Nida

Pieczysko [pjɛˈt͡ʂɨskɔ] (German: Pieczisko (1938-45:Waldofen)) is a settlement in the administrative district of Gmina Ruciane-Nida, within Pisz County, Warmian-Masurian Voivodeship, in northern Poland.
