= Rolki =

- Village
- Location within Poland
- Coordinates: 53°35′N 22°8′E
- Country: Poland
- Voivodeship: Warmian-Masurian
- County: Pisz
- Gmina: Biała Piska

Rolki [ˈrɔlkʲi] (German: Rollken) is a village in the administrative district of Gmina Biała Piska, within Pisz County, Warmian-Masurian Voivodeship, in northern Poland.
