= Kumielsk =

- Village
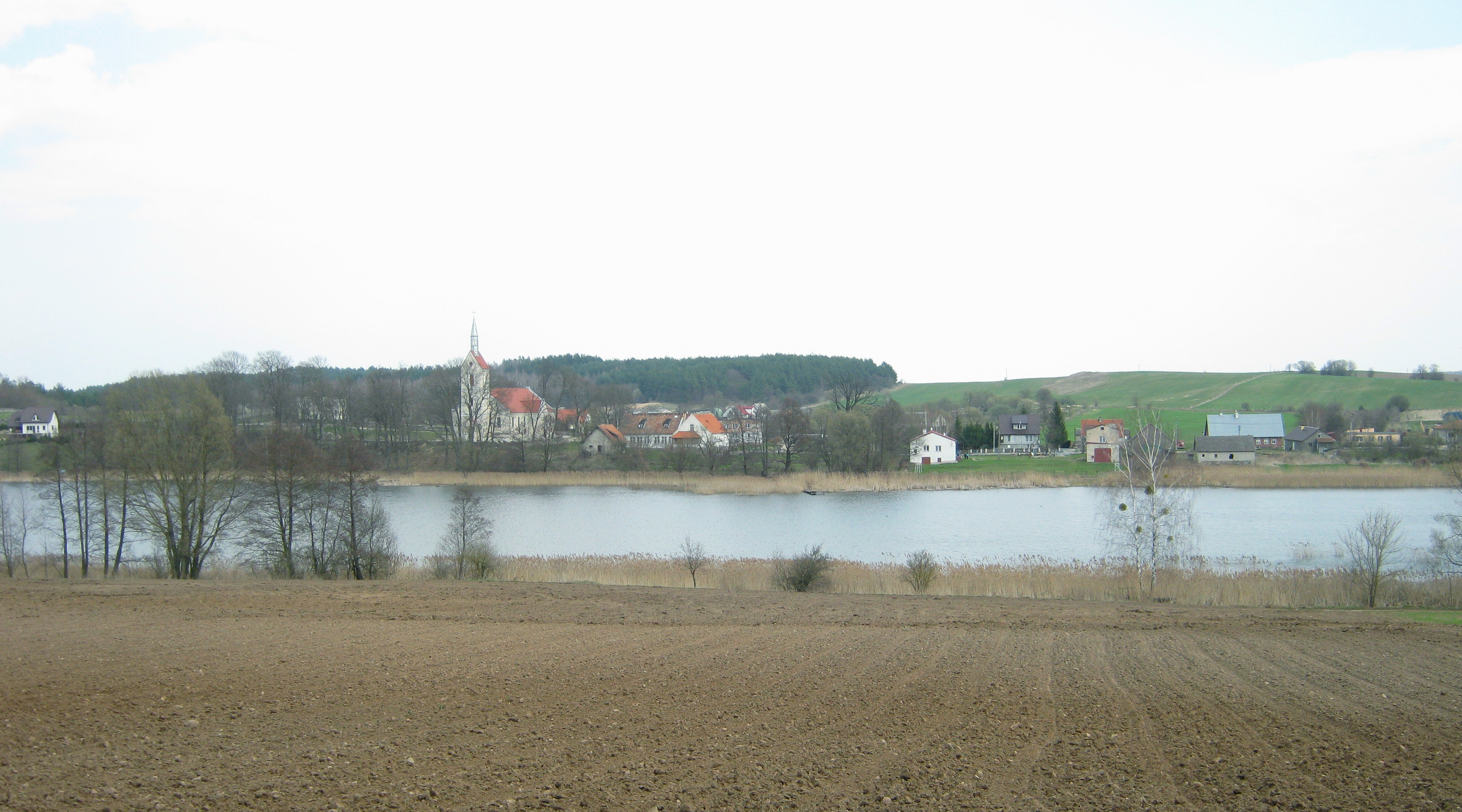

- Location within Poland
- Coordinates: 53°33′N 21°59′E
- Country: Poland
- Voivodeship: Warmian-Masurian
- County: Pisz
- Gmina: Biała Piska
- Elevation: 59 m (194 ft)
- Population: 330

Kumielsk [ˈkumʲɛlsk] is a village in the administrative district of Gmina Biała Piska, within Pisz County, Warmian-Masurian Voivodeship, in northern Poland.
