= Jakuby =

- Village
- Location within Poland
- Coordinates: 53°31′N 22°0′E
- Country: Poland
- Voivodeship: Warmian-Masurian
- County: Pisz
- Gmina: Biała Piska

Jakuby [jaˈkubɨ] is a village in the administrative district of Gmina Biała Piska, within Pisz County, Warmian-Masurian Voivodeship, in northern Poland.
