= Pranie =

- Settlement
- Location within Poland
- Coordinates: 53°36′40″N 21°30′0″E
- Country: Poland
- Voivodeship: Warmian-Masurian
- County: Pisz
- Gmina: Ruciane-Nida

Pranie [ˈpraɲɛ] (German: Seehorst) is a settlement in the administrative district of Gmina Ruciane-Nida, within Pisz County, Warmian-Masurian Voivodeship, in northern Poland.
