= Sokoły, Pisz County =

Sokoły
- Village
- Location within Poland
- Coordinates: 53°37′12″N 22°04′12″E
- Country: Poland
- Voivodeship: Warmian-Masurian
- County: Pisz
- Gmina: Biała Piska

Sokoły [sɔˈkɔwɨ] (German: Falkendorf, until 1935 Sokollen bei Kumilsko) is a village in the administrative district of Gmina Biała Piska, within Pisz County, Warmian-Masurian Voivodeship, in northern Poland.
