= Karwica, Warmian-Masurian Voivodeship =

Karwica
- Village
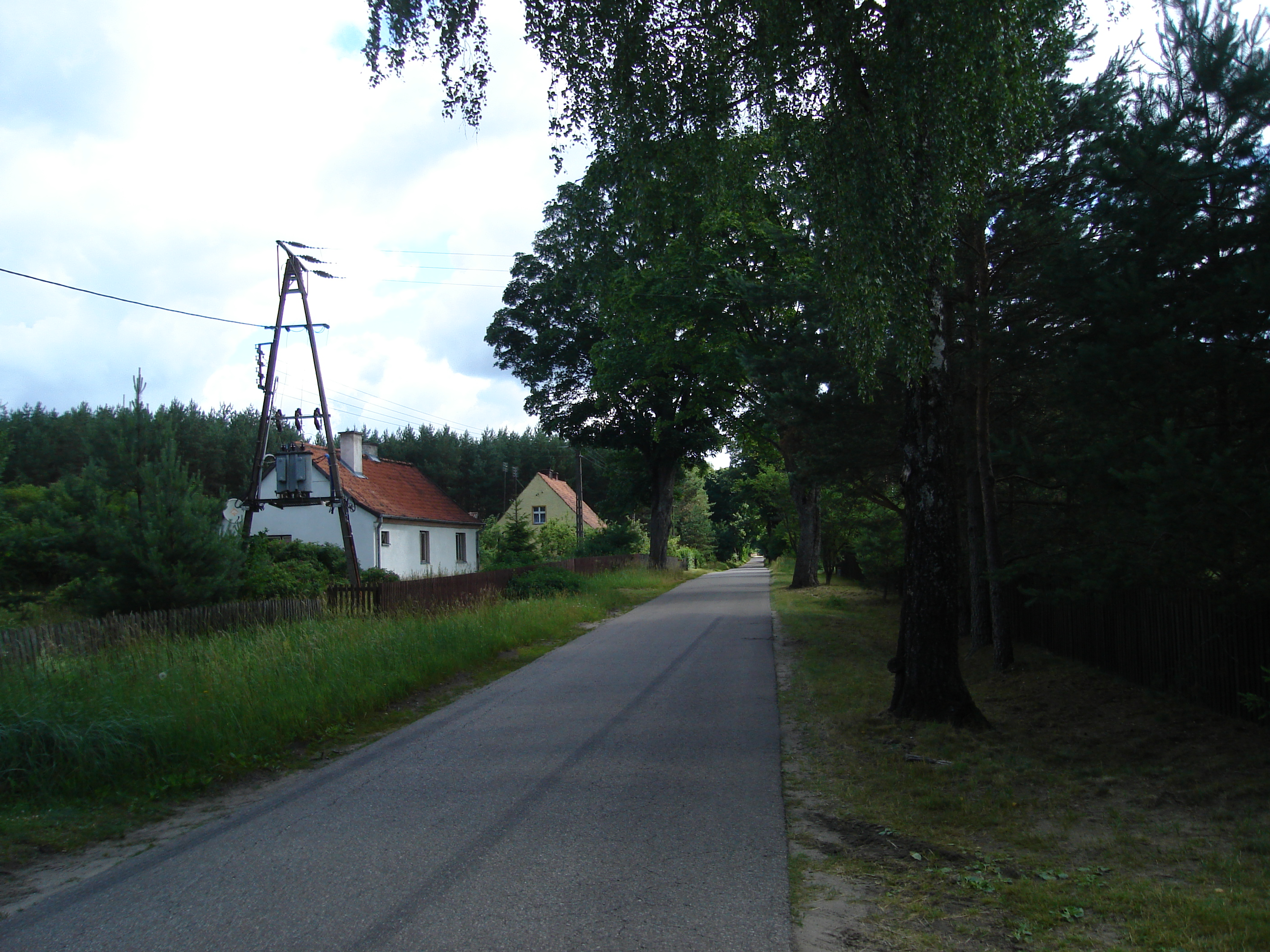

- Location within Poland
- Coordinates: 53°33′35″N 21°30′19″E
- Country: Poland
- Voivodeship: Warmian-Masurian
- County: Pisz
- Gmina: Ruciane-Nida
- Population: 330

Karwica [karˈvit͡sa] is a village in the administrative district of Gmina Ruciane-Nida, within Pisz County, Warmian-Masurian Voivodeship, in northern Poland.
