= Borek, Pisz County =

Borek
- Settlement
- Location within Poland
- Coordinates: 53°32′52″N 21°28′17″E
- Country: Poland
- Voivodeship: Warmian-Masurian
- County: Pisz
- Gmina: Ruciane-Nida

Borek [ˈbɔrɛk] is a settlement in the administrative district of Gmina Ruciane-Nida, within Pisz County, Warmian-Masurian Voivodeship, in northern Poland.
