= Piaski, Pisz County =

Piaski
- Village
- Location within Poland
- Coordinates: 53°41′N 21°36′E
- Country: Poland
- Voivodeship: Warmian-Masurian
- County: Pisz
- Gmina: Ruciane-Nida
- Time zone: UTC+1 (CET)
  - Summer (DST): UTC+2 (CEST)
- Postal code: 12-220
- Vehicle registration: NPI

Piaski (Polish pronunciation: [ˈpjaskʲi]) is a village in the administrative district of Gmina Ruciane-Nida, within Pisz County, Warmian-Masurian Voivodeship, in northern Poland. It is located in Masuria.
