= Włosty, Pisz County =

Włosty
- Village
- Location within Poland
- Coordinates: 53°35′N 22°12′E
- Country: Poland
- Voivodeship: Warmian-Masurian
- County: Pisz
- Gmina: Biała Piska
- Population: 110

Włosty [ˈvwɔstɨ] (German: Flosten) is a village in the administrative district of Gmina Biała Piska, within Pisz County, Warmian-Masurian Voivodeship, in northern Poland.

The village has a population of 110.
