= Grodzisko, Pisz County =

Grodzisko
- Village
- Location within Poland
- Coordinates: 53°31′N 21°58′E
- Country: Poland
- Voivodeship: Warmian-Masurian
- County: Pisz
- Gmina: Biała Piska
- Time zone: UTC+1 (CET)
  - Summer (DST): UTC+2 (CEST)
- Vehicle registration: NPI

Grodzisko [ɡrɔˈd͡ʑiskɔ] is a village in the administrative district of Gmina Biała Piska, within Pisz County, Warmian-Masurian Voivodeship, in north-eastern Poland. It is located in Masuria.
