= Zatorze-Kolonia =

- Settlement
- Location within Poland
- Coordinates: 53°37′12″N 22°04′12″E
- Country: Poland
- Voivodeship: Warmian-Masurian
- County: Pisz
- Gmina: Biała Piska

Zatorze-Kolonia [zaˈtɔʐɛ kɔˈlɔɲa] is a settlement in the administrative district of Gmina Biała Piska, within Pisz County, Warmian-Masurian Voivodeship, in northern Poland.
