= Świdry Kościelne =

- Village
- Location within Poland
- Coordinates: 53°34′12″N 22°09′20″E
- Country: Poland
- Voivodeship: Warmian-Masurian
- County: Pisz
- Gmina: Biała Piska

Świdry Kościelne (Polish pronunciation: [ˈɕfidrɨ kɔɕˈt͡ɕɛlnɛ]) is a village in the administrative district of Gmina Biała Piska within Pisz County, Warmian-Masurian Voivodeship, in northern Poland.
