= Pogorzel Wielka =

- Village
- Location within Poland
- Coordinates: 53°43′N 22°9′E
- Country: Poland
- Voivodeship: Warmian-Masurian
- County: Pisz
- Gmina: Biała Piska
- Population: 180

Pogorzel Wielka [pɔˈɡɔʐɛl ˈvʲɛlka] (German: Brennen) is a village in the administrative district of Gmina Biała Piska, within Pisz County, Warmian-Masurian Voivodeship, in northern Poland.

The village has a population of 180.
