= Zameczek, Pisz County =

Zameczek
- Village
- Location within Poland
- Coordinates: 53°41′N 21°29′E
- Country: Poland
- Voivodeship: Warmian-Masurian
- County: Pisz
- Gmina: Ruciane-Nida

Zameczek [zaˈmɛt͡ʂɛk] (German: Schlößchen) is a village in the administrative district of Gmina Ruciane-Nida, within Pisz County, Warmian-Masurian Voivodeship, in northern Poland.
