= Kamień, Pisz County =

Kamień
- Settlement
- Location within Poland
- Coordinates: 53°42′44″N 21°33′59″E
- Country: Poland
- Voivodeship: Warmian-Masurian
- County: Pisz
- Gmina: Ruciane-Nida
- Population: 2

Kamień (Polish pronunciation: [ˈkamjɛj̃]) is a settlement in the administrative district of Gmina Ruciane-Nida, within Pisz County, Warmian-Masurian Voivodeship, in northern Poland.
