= Śwignajno Wielkie =

- Settlement
- Location within Poland
- Coordinates: 53°41′N 21°32′E
- Country: Poland
- Voivodeship: Warmian-Masurian
- County: Pisz
- Gmina: Ruciane-Nida
- Population: 30

Śwignajno Wielkie [ɕfiɡˈnai̯nɔ ˈvjɛlkʲɛ] (German: Groß Schwignainen) is a settlement in the administrative district of Gmina Ruciane-Nida, within Pisz County, Warmian-Masurian Voivodeship, in northern Poland.

The settlement has a population of 30.
