= Cwaliny, Warmian-Masurian Voivodeship =

Cwaliny
- Village
- Location within Poland
- Coordinates: 53°33′N 22°1′E
- Country: Poland
- Voivodeship: Warmian-Masurian
- County: Pisz
- Gmina: Biała Piska
- Population: 80

Cwaliny [t͡sfaˈlʲinɨ] is a village in the administrative district of Gmina Biała Piska, within Pisz County, Warmian-Masurian Voivodeship, in northern Poland.
