= Kolonia Konopki =

- Village
- Location within Poland
- Coordinates: 53°37′30″N 22°04′15″E
- Country: Poland
- Voivodeship: Warmian-Masurian
- County: Pisz
- Gmina: Biała Piska

Kolonia Konopki [kɔˈlɔɲa kɔˈnɔpkʲi] is a village in the administrative district of Gmina Biała Piska, within Pisz County, Warmian-Masurian Voivodeship, in northern Poland.
