= Myszki, Warmian-Masurian Voivodeship =

Myszki
- Village
- Location within Poland
- Coordinates: 53°39′40″N 22°9′26″E
- Country: Poland
- Voivodeship: Warmian-Masurian
- County: Pisz
- Gmina: Biała Piska
- Population: 101

Myszki [ˈmɨʂkʲi] is a village in the administrative district of Gmina Biała Piska, within Pisz County, Warmian-Masurian Voivodeship, in northern Poland.
