= Wejsuny-Leśniczówka =

- Village
- Location within Poland
- Coordinates: 53°40′26″N 21°37′38″E
- Country: Poland
- Voivodeship: Warmian-Masurian
- County: Pisz
- Gmina: Ruciane-Nida
- Population: 13

Wejsuny-Leśniczówka (Polish pronunciation: [vɛjˈsunɨ lɛɕɲiˈtʂufka]) is a village in the administrative district of Gmina Ruciane-Nida, within Pisz County, Warmian-Masurian Voivodeship, in northern Poland.

The village has a population of 13.
