= Kokoszka, Warmian-Masurian Voivodeship =

Kokoszka
- Settlement
- Location within Poland
- Coordinates: 53°39′51″N 21°32′35″E
- Country: Poland
- Voivodeship: Warmian-Masurian
- County: Pisz
- Gmina: Ruciane-Nida

Kokoszka [kɔˈkɔʂka] is a settlement in the administrative district of Gmina Ruciane-Nida, within Pisz County, Warmian-Masurian Voivodeship, in northern Poland.
