= Nitki =

- Village
- Location within Poland
- Coordinates: 53°44′N 22°7′E
- Country: Poland
- Voivodeship: Warmian-Masurian
- County: Pisz
- Gmina: Biała Piska
- Population: 90

Nitki [ˈɲitkʲi] is a village in the administrative district of Gmina Biała Piska, within Pisz County, Warmian-Masurian Voivodeship, in northern Poland.
