= Sokoły Jeziorne =

- Village
- Location within Poland
- Coordinates: 53°37′55″N 22°16′35″E
- Country: Poland
- Voivodeship: Warmian-Masurian
- County: Pisz
- Gmina: Biała Piska
- Population: 120

Sokoły Jeziorne [sɔˈkɔwɨ jɛˈʑɔrnɛ] (German: Rosensee, until 1935: Sokollen bei Skarzinnen) is a village in the administrative district of Gmina Biała Piska, within Pisz County, Warmian-Masurian Voivodeship, in northern Poland.

The village has a population of 120.
