= Wojnowo, Warmian-Masurian Voivodeship =

Wojnowo
- Village
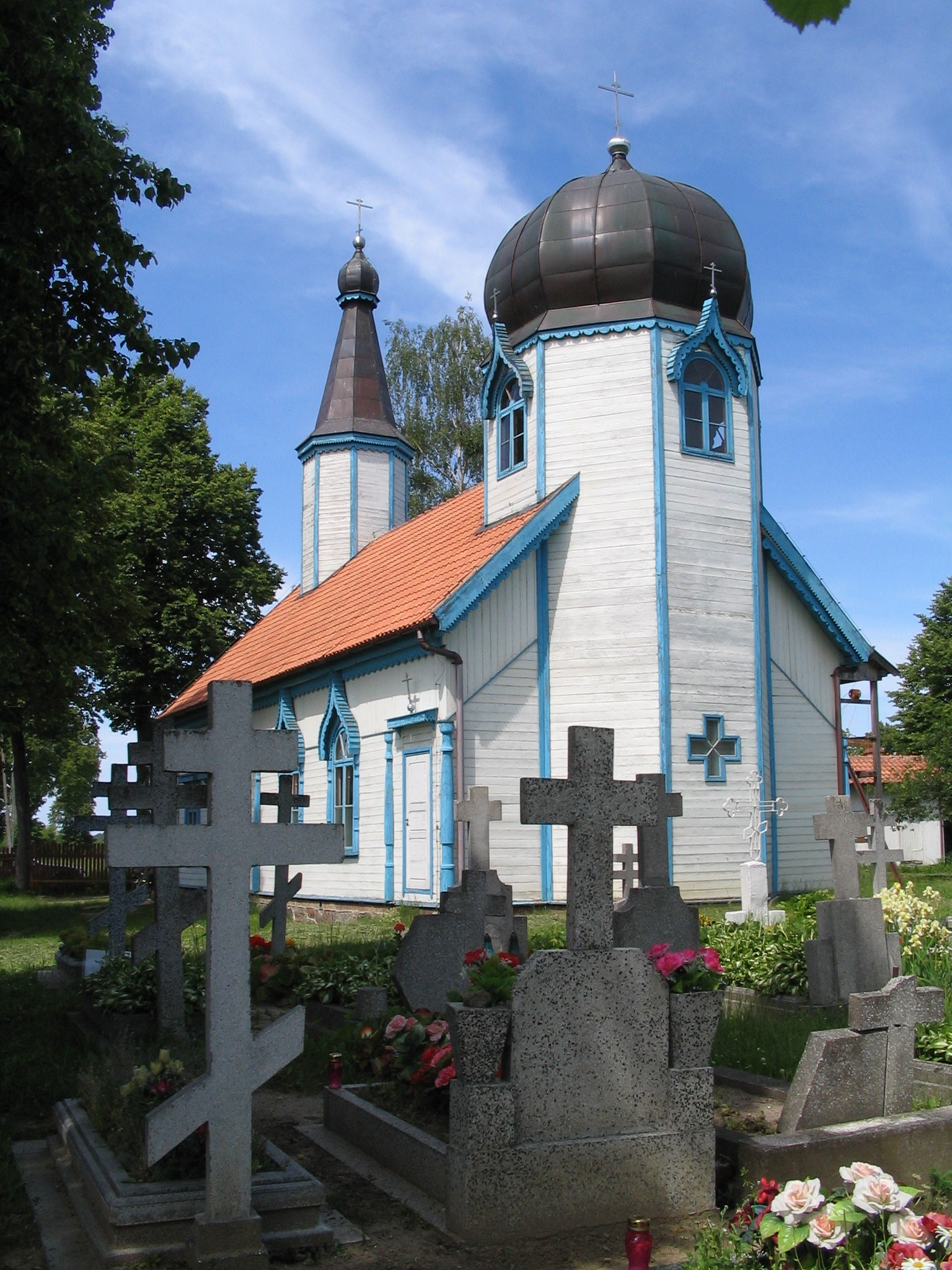
- Orthodox Church, serving simultaneously as a monastery and parish church

- Location within Poland
- Coordinates: 53°40′N 21°28′E
- Country: Poland
- Voivodeship: Warmian-Masurian
- County: Pisz
- Gmina: Ruciane-Nida
- Population: 230
- Website: http://szewo.com/gallery/mazury/

Wojnowo [vɔi̯ˈnɔvɔ] (German: Eckertsdorf) is a village in the administrative district of Gmina Ruciane-Nida, within Pisz County, Warmian-Masurian Voivodeship, in northern Poland.

The village was founded by Philipons, refugees from Russia, who were pursecuted for their religion in the 1830s and emigrated to Prussia. The community arrived in the village in the years 1828–32.
