= Kożuchowski (disambiguation) =

Małgorzata Kożuchowska is a Polish actress.

Kożuchowski or Kożuchowska may also refer to:

== Geography ==
- Kożuchowski Młyn, a settlement in Warmian-Masurian Voivodeship
- Wólka Kożuchowska, a village in Masovian Voivodeship
