= Komorowo, Pisz County =

Komorowo
- Village
- Location within Poland
- Coordinates: 53°36′02″N 22°05′26″E
- Country: Poland
- Voivodeship: Warmian-Masurian
- County: Pisz
- Gmina: Biała Piska
- Population: 160

Komorowo [kɔmɔˈrɔvɔ] is a village in the administrative district of Gmina Biała Piska, within Pisz County, Warmian-Masurian Voivodeship, in northern Poland.
