= Łodygowo, Pisz County =

Łodygowo
- Village
- Location within Poland
- Coordinates: 53°35′N 22°11′E
- Country: Poland
- Voivodeship: Warmian-Masurian
- County: Pisz
- Gmina: Biała Piska
- Population: 100
- Time zone: UTC+1 (CET)
  - Summer (DST): UTC+2 (CEST)
- Vehicle registration: NPI

Łodygowo [wɔdɨˈɡɔvɔ] is a village in the administrative district of Gmina Biała Piska, within Pisz County, Warmian-Masurian Voivodeship, in north-eastern Poland. It is located in the historic region of Masuria.

== History ==
The village was founded and inhabited by Polish people. Historically, it had four equivalent Polish names: Łodygowo, Łodwigowo, Łodwigowczyki and Łodwigowszczyki.

== Transport ==
The Polish National road 58 runs nearby, south of the village.
