= Danowo, Pisz County =

Danowo
- Village
- Location within Poland
- Coordinates: 53°34′N 22°6′E
- Country: Poland
- Voivodeship: Warmian-Masurian
- County: Pisz
- Gmina: Biała Piska
- Population: 70
- Postal code: 12-230

Danowo [daˈnɔvɔ] is a village in the administrative district of Gmina Biała Piska, within Pisz County, Warmian-Masurian Voivodeship, in northern Poland.
