= Krzyże =

- Village
- Location within Poland
- Coordinates: 53°35′6″N 21°31′14″E
- Country: Poland
- Voivodeship: Warmian-Masurian
- County: Pisz
- Gmina: Ruciane-Nida
- Population: 80

Krzyże [ˈkʂɨʐɛ] is a village in the administrative district of Gmina Ruciane-Nida, within Pisz County, Warmian-Masurian Voivodeship, in northern Poland.
