= Guzki, Pisz County =

Guzki
- Village
- Location within Poland
- Coordinates: 53°32′N 21°57′E
- Country: Poland
- Voivodeship: Warmian-Masurian
- County: Pisz
- Gmina: Biała Piska
- Population: 100

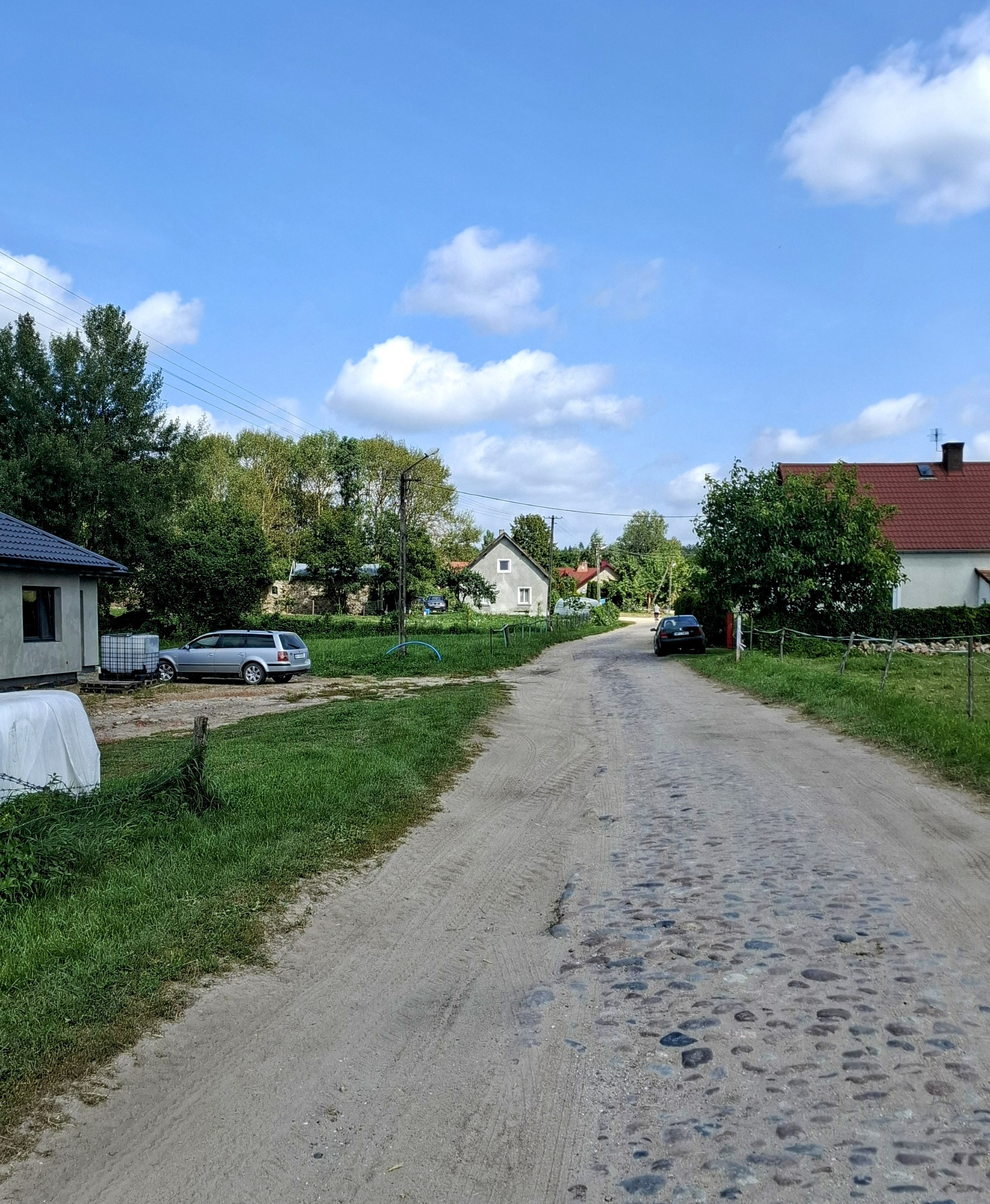
Street through Guzki 2025

Guzki [ˈɡuskʲi] is a village in the administrative district of Gmina Biała Piska, within Pisz County, Warmian-Masurian Voivodeship, in northern Poland.
