= Zdrużno =

- Settlement
- Location within Poland
- Coordinates: 53°37′1″N 21°28′17″E
- Country: Poland
- Voivodeship: Warmian-Masurian
- County: Pisz
- Gmina: Ruciane-Nida

Zdrużno [ˈzdruʐnɔ] (German: Sdrusno (1938-45:Eichenborn)) is a settlement in the administrative district of Gmina Ruciane-Nida, within Pisz County, Warmian-Masurian Voivodeship, in northern Poland.
