= Skarżyn, Warmian-Masurian Voivodeship =

Skarżyn
- Village
- Location within Poland
- Coordinates: 53°36′39″N 22°13′45″E
- Country: Poland
- Voivodeship: Warmian-Masurian
- County: Pisz
- Gmina: Biała Piska
- Population: 190

Skarżyn [ˈskarʐɨn] (German: Richtenberg, before 1938: Skarzinnen) is a village in the administrative district of Gmina Biała Piska, within Pisz County, Warmian-Masurian Voivodeship, in northern Poland.

The village has a population of 190.
