= Lisiczyn =

- Settlement
- Location within Poland
- Coordinates: 53°33′36″N 21°30′5″E
- Country: Poland
- Voivodeship: Warmian-Masurian
- County: Pisz
- Gmina: Ruciane-Nida
- Population: 15

Lisiczyn [liˈɕit͡ʂɨn] is a settlement in the administrative district of Gmina Ruciane-Nida, within Pisz County, Warmian-Masurian Voivodeship, in northern Poland.
