= Sulimy =

Sulimy may refer to the following places:

- Sulimy, Łódź Voivodeship (central Poland)
- Sulimy, Podlaskie Voivodeship (north-east Poland)
- Sulimy, Giżycko County in Warmian-Masurian Voivodeship (north Poland)
- Sulimy, Pisz County in Warmian-Masurian Voivodeship (north Poland)
