= Popielno, Warmian-Masurian Voivodeship =

Popielno
- Settlement
- Location within Poland
- Coordinates: 53°45′N 21°37′E
- Country: Poland
- Voivodeship: Warmian-Masurian
- County: Pisz
- Gmina: Ruciane-Nida
- Population: 180

Popielno [pɔˈpjɛlnɔ] (German: Spirding; until 1928: Popiellnen) is a settlement in the administrative district of Gmina Ruciane-Nida, within Pisz County, Warmian-Masurian Voivodeship, in northern Poland.

The settlement has a population of 180.
