= Szymki, Warmian-Masurian Voivodeship =

Szymki
- Village
- Location within Poland
- Coordinates: 53°34′53″N 21°58′4″E
- Country: Poland
- Voivodeship: Warmian-Masurian
- County: Pisz
- Gmina: Biała Piska
- Population: 130

Szymki (Polish: [ˈʂɨmkʲi]; German: Simken) is a village in the administrative district of Gmina Biała Piska, within Pisz County, Warmian-Masurian Voivodeship, in northern Poland.

The village has a population of 130.
