= Bartlewo =

Bartlewo may refer to the following places:

- Bartlewo, Kuyavian-Pomeranian Voivodeship (north-central Poland)
- Bartlewo, Warmian-Masurian Voivodeship (north Poland)
- Bartlewo, West Pomeranian Voivodeship (north-west Poland)
