= Majdan, Warmian-Masurian Voivodeship =

Majdan
- Settlement
- Location within Poland
- Coordinates: 53°39′16″N 21°29′1″E
- Country: Poland
- Voivodeship: Warmian-Masurian
- County: Pisz
- Gmina: Ruciane-Nida
- Population: 15

Majdan (Polish pronunciation: [ˈmajdan]) is a settlement in the administrative district of Gmina Ruciane-Nida, within Pisz County, Warmian-Masurian Voivodeship, in northern Poland.
