= Zamordeje =

- Village
- Location within Poland
- Coordinates: 53°33′53″N 21°35′4″E
- Country: Poland
- Voivodeship: Warmian-Masurian
- County: Pisz
- Gmina: Ruciane-Nida
- Population: 30

Zamordeje [zamɔrˈdɛjɛ] (German: Samordei) is a village in the administrative district of Gmina Ruciane-Nida, within Pisz County, Warmian-Masurian Voivodeship, in northern Poland.

The village has a population of 30.
