= Jeleń, Pisz County =

Jeleń
- Settlement
- Location within Poland
- Coordinates: 53°35′49″N 21°27′1″E
- Country: Poland
- Voivodeship: Warmian-Masurian
- County: Pisz
- Gmina: Ruciane-Nida

Jeleń [ˈjɛlɛɲ] is a settlement in the administrative district of Gmina Ruciane-Nida, within Pisz County, Warmian-Masurian Voivodeship, in northern Poland.
