= Wojny, Warmian-Masurian Voivodeship =

Wojny
- Village
- Location within Poland
- Coordinates: 53°37′0″N 22°10′47″E
- Country: Poland
- Voivodeship: Warmian-Masurian
- County: Pisz
- Gmina: Biała Piska
- Population: 60

Wojny (Polish pronunciation: [ˈvɔjnɨ]; German: Woinen) is a village in the administrative district of Gmina Biała Piska, within Pisz County, Warmian-Masurian Voivodeship, in northern Poland.

The village has a population of 60.
