= Zabielne, Pisz County =

Zabielne
- Village
- Location within Poland
- Coordinates: 53°38′N 22°1′E
- Country: Poland
- Voivodeship: Warmian-Masurian
- County: Pisz
- Gmina: Biała Piska
- Population: 70

Zabielne [zaˈbʲɛlnɛ] (German: Sabielnen) is a village in the administrative district of Gmina Biała Piska, within Pisz County, Warmian-Masurian Voivodeship, in northern Poland.

The village has a population of 70.
