= Szeroki =

Szeroki may refer to the following places in Poland:

- Szeroki Bór
- Szeroki Bór Piski
- Szeroki Kamień
