= Warnowo, Warmian-Masurian Voivodeship =

Warnowo
- Village
- Location within Poland
- Coordinates: 53°42′23″N 21°37′10″E
- Country: Poland
- Voivodeship: Warmian-Masurian
- County: Pisz
- Gmina: Ruciane-Nida

Warnowo [varˈnɔvɔ] (German: Gut Warnold) is a village in the administrative district of Gmina Ruciane-Nida, within Pisz County, Warmian-Masurian Voivodeship, in northern Poland.
