= Zaroślak, Gmina Ruciane-Nida =

Zaroślak
- Settlement
- Location within Poland
- Coordinates: 53°32′38″N 21°31′8″E
- Country: Poland
- Voivodeship: Warmian-Masurian
- County: Pisz
- Gmina: Ruciane-Nida

Zaroślak [zaˈrɔɕlak] (German: Niederwald) is a settlement in the administrative district of Gmina Ruciane-Nida, within Pisz County, Warmian-Masurian Voivodeship, in northern Poland.
