= Pogorzel Mała =

- Village
- Location within Poland
- Coordinates: 53°42′N 22°9′E
- Country: Poland
- Voivodeship: Warmian-Masurian
- County: Pisz
- Gmina: Biała Piska

Pogorzel Mała [pɔˈɡɔʐɛl ˈmawa] (German: Brandau) is a village in the administrative district of Gmina Biała Piska, within Pisz County, Warmian-Masurian Voivodeship, in northern Poland.
