= Zalesie, Pisz County =

Zalesie
- Village
- Location within Poland
- Coordinates: 53°41′N 22°9′E
- Country: Poland
- Voivodeship: Warmian-Masurian
- County: Pisz
- Gmina: Biała Piska

Zalesie [zaˈlɛɕɛ] (German: Salleschen) is a village in the administrative district of Gmina Biała Piska, within Pisz County, Warmian-Masurian Voivodeship, in northern Poland.
