= Zaskwierki, Pisz County =

Zaskwierki
- Village
- Location within Poland
- Coordinates: 53°40′N 22°7′E
- Country: Poland
- Voivodeship: Warmian-Masurian
- County: Pisz
- Gmina: Biała Piska

Zaskwierki [zaskˈfʲɛrkʲi] (German: Jurgasdorf) is a village in the administrative district of Gmina Biała Piska, within Pisz County, Warmian-Masurian Voivodeship, in northern Poland.
