= Wólka, Pisz County =

Wólka
- Village
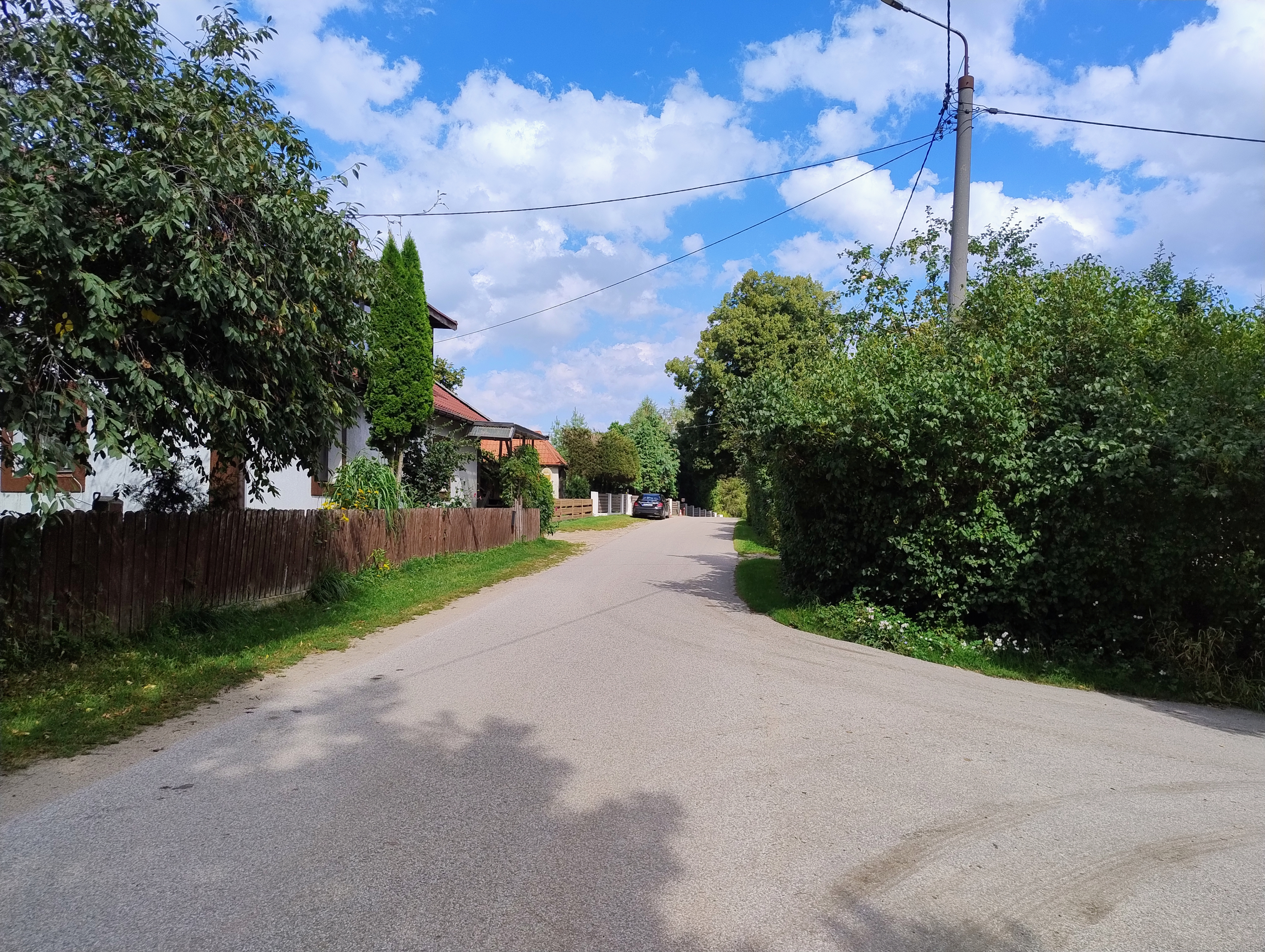

- Location within Poland
- Coordinates: 53°39′47″N 21°31′22″E
- Country: Poland
- Voivodeship: Warmian-Masurian
- County: Pisz
- Gmina: Ruciane-Nida

Wólka [ˈvulka] (German: Dietrichswalde) is a village in the administrative district of Gmina Ruciane-Nida, within Pisz County, Warmian-Masurian Voivodeship, in northern Poland.
