= Rakowo Małe =

- Village
- Location within Poland
- Coordinates: 53°43′8″N 22°12′42″E
- Country: Poland
- Voivodeship: Warmian-Masurian
- County: Pisz
- Gmina: Biała Piska
- Population: 120

Rakowo Małe [raˈkɔvɔ ˈmawɛ] (German: Köllmisch Rakowen) is a village in the administrative district of Gmina Biała Piska, within Pisz County, Warmian-Masurian Voivodeship, in northern Poland.

The village has a population of 120.
