= Szkody =

- Village
- Location within Poland
- Coordinates: 53°36′N 22°3′E
- Country: Poland
- Voivodeship: Warmian-Masurian
- County: Pisz
- Gmina: Biała Piska
- Population: 160

Szkody [ˈʂkɔdɨ] (German: Skodden) is a village in the administrative district of Gmina Biała Piska, within Pisz County, Warmian-Masurian Voivodeship, in northern Poland.

The village has a population of 160.
