= Iwanowo, Warmian-Masurian Voivodeship =

Iwanowo
- Village
- Location within Poland
- Coordinates: 53°41′N 21°28′E
- Country: Poland
- Voivodeship: Warmian-Masurian
- County: Pisz
- Gmina: Ruciane-Nida

Iwanowo [ivaˈnɔvɔ] is a village in the administrative district of Gmina Ruciane-Nida, within Pisz County, Warmian-Masurian Voivodeship, in northern Poland.
