= Iłki =

- Village
- Location within Poland
- Coordinates: 53°41′15″N 22°4′56″E
- Country: Poland
- Voivodeship: Warmian-Masurian
- County: Pisz
- Gmina: Biała Piska

Iłki [ˈiu̯kʲi] is a village in the administrative district of Gmina Biała Piska, within Pisz County, Warmian-Masurian Voivodeship, in northern Poland.
