= Niedźwiedzi Róg =

- Village
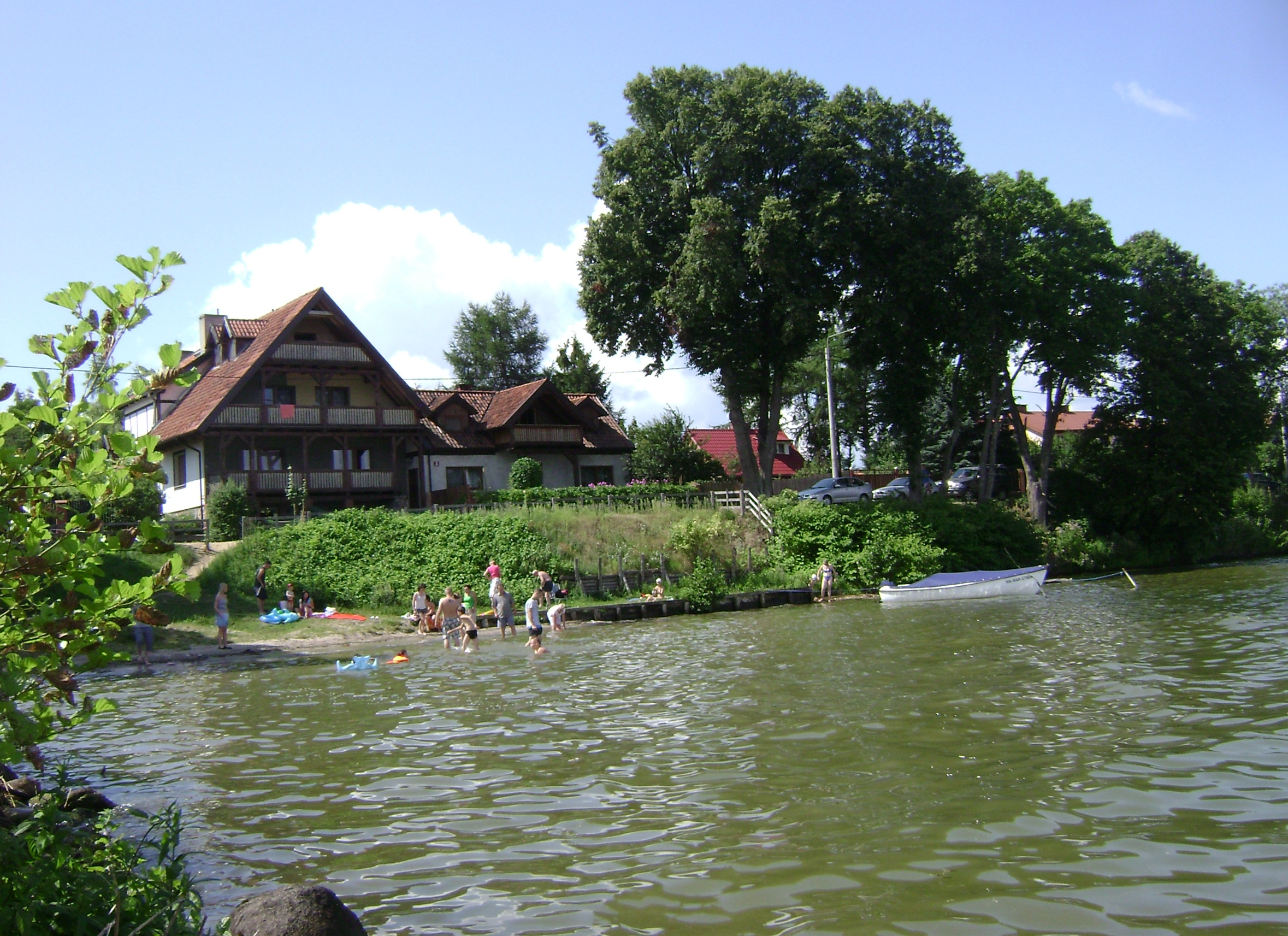

- Location within Poland
- Coordinates: 53°43′3″N 21°41′38″E
- Country: Poland
- Voivodeship: Warmian-Masurian
- County: Pisz
- Gmina: Ruciane-Nida
- Population: 40

Niedźwiedzi Róg [ɲɛd͡ʑˈvjɛd͡ʑi ˈruk] (literally "Bear's Corner") is a village in the administrative district of Gmina Ruciane-Nida, within Pisz County, Warmian-Masurian Voivodeship, in northern Poland.
