= Ruczaj, Warmian-Masurian Voivodeship =

Ruczaj
- Settlement
- Location within Poland
- Coordinates: 53°34′3″N 21°28′8″E
- Country: Poland
- Voivodeship: Warmian-Masurian
- County: Pisz
- Gmina: Ruciane-Nida

Ruczaj [ˈrut͡ʂai̯] is a settlement in the administrative district of Gmina Ruciane-Nida, within Pisz County, Warmian-Masurian Voivodeship, in northern Poland.
