= Szeroki Bór =

- Village
- Location within Poland
- Coordinates: 53°39′N 21°40′E
- Country: Poland
- Voivodeship: Warmian-Masurian
- County: Pisz
- Gmina: Ruciane-Nida
- Population: 300

Szeroki Bór [ʂɛˈrɔki ˈbur] (German: Breitenheide) is a village in the administrative district of Gmina Ruciane-Nida, within Pisz County, Warmian-Masurian Voivodeship, in northern Poland.

The village has a population of 300.
