= Bartlewo, Warmian-Masurian Voivodeship =

Bartlewo
- Village
- Location within Poland
- Coordinates: 53°44′03″N 21°33′50″E
- Country: Poland
- Voivodeship: Warmian-Masurian
- County: Pisz
- Gmina: Ruciane-Nida
- Population: 8

Bartlewo [barˈtlɛvɔ] is a village in the administrative district of Gmina Ruciane-Nida, within Pisz County, Warmian-Masurian Voivodeship, in northern Poland.
