= Gmina Biała Piska =

Gmina Biała Piska Biała Piska Commune
- Gmina
- Coat of arms
- Interactive map of Gmina Biała Piska
- Coordinates (Biała Piska): 53°37′N 22°4′E
- Country: Poland
- Voivodeship: Warmian-Masurian
- County: Pisz
- Seat: Biała Piska

Area
  - Total: 420.14 km^{2} (162.22 sq mi)

Population (2006)
  - Total: 12,135
  - Density: 28.883/km^{2} (74.807/sq mi)
  - Urban: 4,006
  - Rural: 8,129
- Website: http://bip.bialapiska.pl/

Gmina Biała Piska is an urban-rural gmina (administrative district) in Pisz County, Warmian-Masurian Voivodeship, in northern Poland. Its seat is the town of Biała Piska, which lies approximately 18 kilometres (11 mi) east of Pisz and 105 km (65 mi) east of the regional capital Olsztyn.

The gmina covers an area of 420.14 square kilometres (162.2 sq mi), and as of 2006 its total population is 12,135 (out of which the population of Biała Piska amounts to 4,006, and the population of the rural part of the gmina is 8,129).

== Villages ==
Apart from the town of Biała Piska, Gmina Biała Piska contains the villages and settlements of Bełcząc, Bemowo Piskie, Cibory, Cwaliny, Dąbrówka Drygalska, Danowo, Długi Kąt, Dmusy, Drygały, Giętkie, Grodzisko, Gruzy, Guzki, Iłki, Jakuby, Kaliszki, Klarewo, Kolonia Kawałek, Kolonia Konopki, Komorowo, Konopki, Kowalewo, Kózki, Kożuchowski Młyn, Kożuchy, Kożuchy Małe, Kruszewo, Kumielsk, Lipińskie, Lisy, Łodygowo, Mikuty, Monety, Myśliki, Myszki, Nitki, Nowe Drygały, Oblewo, Orłowo, Pawłocin, Pogorzel Mała, Pogorzel Wielka, Radysy, Rakowo Małe, Rogale Wielkie, Rolki, Ruda, Skarżyn, Sokoły, Sokoły Jeziorne, Sulimy, Świdry, Świdry Kościelne, Szkody, Szkody-Kolonia, Szymki, Włosty, Wojny, Zabielne, Zalesie, Zaskwierki and Zatorze-Kolonia.

== Neighbouring gminas ==
Gmina Biała Piska is bordered by the gminas of Ełk, Grabowo, Kolno, Orzysz, Pisz, Prostki and Szczuczyn.
