= Biała Piska =

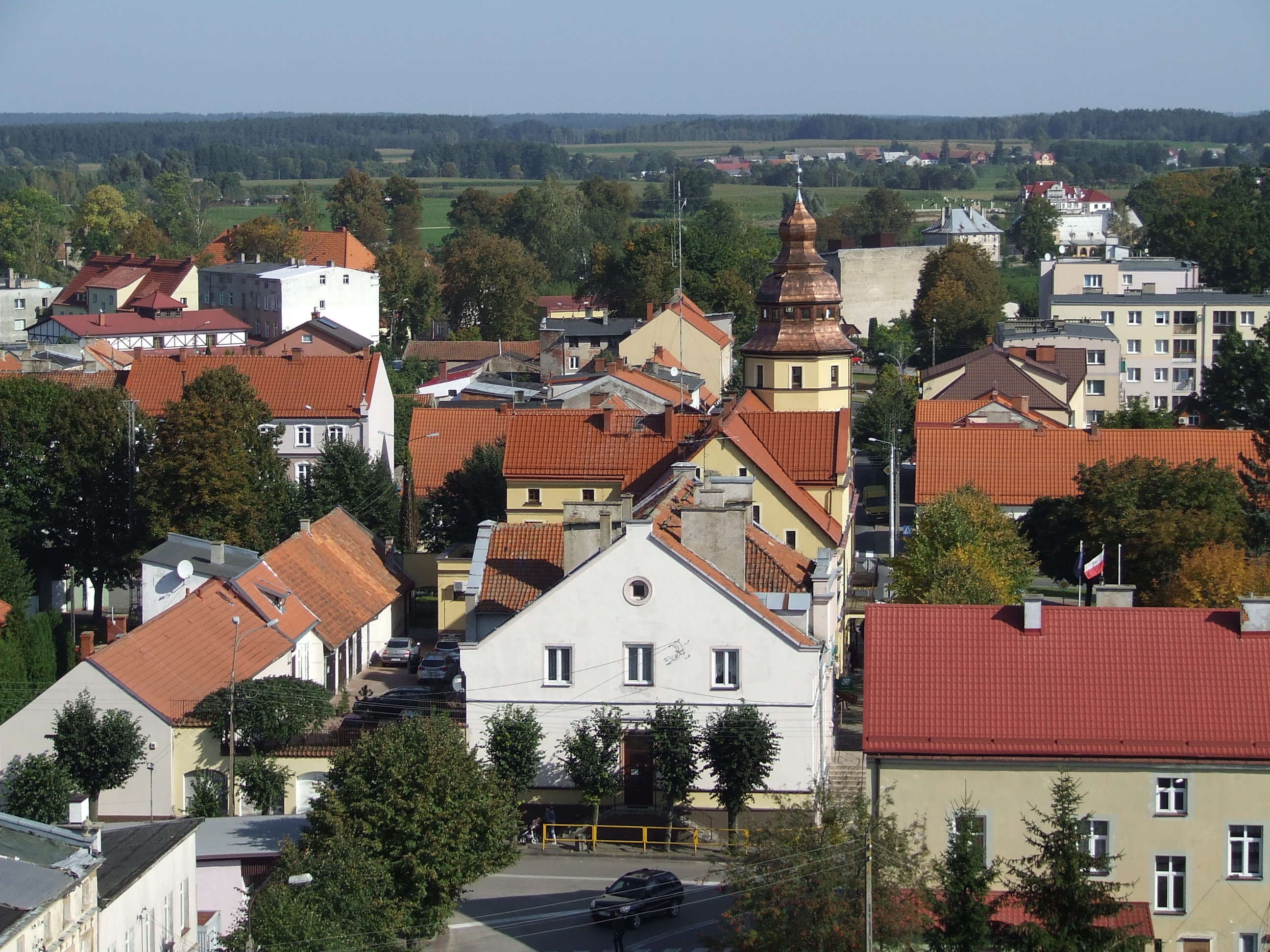
- Town centre

- Coat of arms

- Location within Poland
- Coordinates: 53°37′N 22°4′E
- Country: Poland
- Voivodeship: Warmian-Masurian
- County: Pisz
- Gmina: Biała Piska
- Established: 15th century
- Town rights: 1722

Government
  - Mayor: Beata Sokołowska

Area
  - Total: 3.24 km^{2} (1.25 sq mi)

Population (31 December 2021)
  - Total: 3,986
  - Density: 1,230/km^{2} (3,200/sq mi)
- Time zone: UTC+1 (CET)
  - Summer (DST): UTC+2 (CEST)
- Postal code: 12-230
- Area code: +48 87
- Car plates: NPI
- Website: http://www.bialapiska.eu/

Biała Piska [ˈbʲawa ˈpʲiska] (former Polish: Biała; German: Bialla, 1938-45: Gehlenburg, 1334: Gailen) is a town in Pisz County, Warmian-Masurian Voivodeship, Poland, with 3,986 inhabitants as of December 2021.

Biała Piska is a member of Cittaslow.

== Geography ==
Biała Piska is located near recreation area in the Masurian Lake District, in the eastern part of the Warmian-Masurian Voivodeship, in the ethnographic region of Masuria. To the south is the Puszcza Piska, a heath with large forests.

== History ==
First mentioned as "Gailen" in 1334. The town was established in 1428 as a farming village on 60 włókas of land in the monastic state of the Teutonic Knights. The Polish name of the settlement was Biała, meaning white. It was later Germanized to the name Bialla. In 1454 it was incorporated to Poland by King Casimir IV Jagiellon upon the request of the anti-Teutonic Prussian Confederation. After the subsequent Thirteen Years' War (1454–1466) the Teutonic Order regained authority over the town as a fief of the Polish Crown. In 1480 a church was built in the town. In 1481, Piotr Świętosławicz from the Diocese of Płock became the local parish priest. In the 16th century it grew rapidly in the Duchy of Prussia (vassal state of Poland), as trading increased. In the middle of the century there were 38 farms and three mills. As of 1539, the population of the village was solely Polish. In 1645 it gained the right to host four fairs per year. In 1656 it was pillaged by the Tatars, plundered and burned, and many residents died or were displaced.

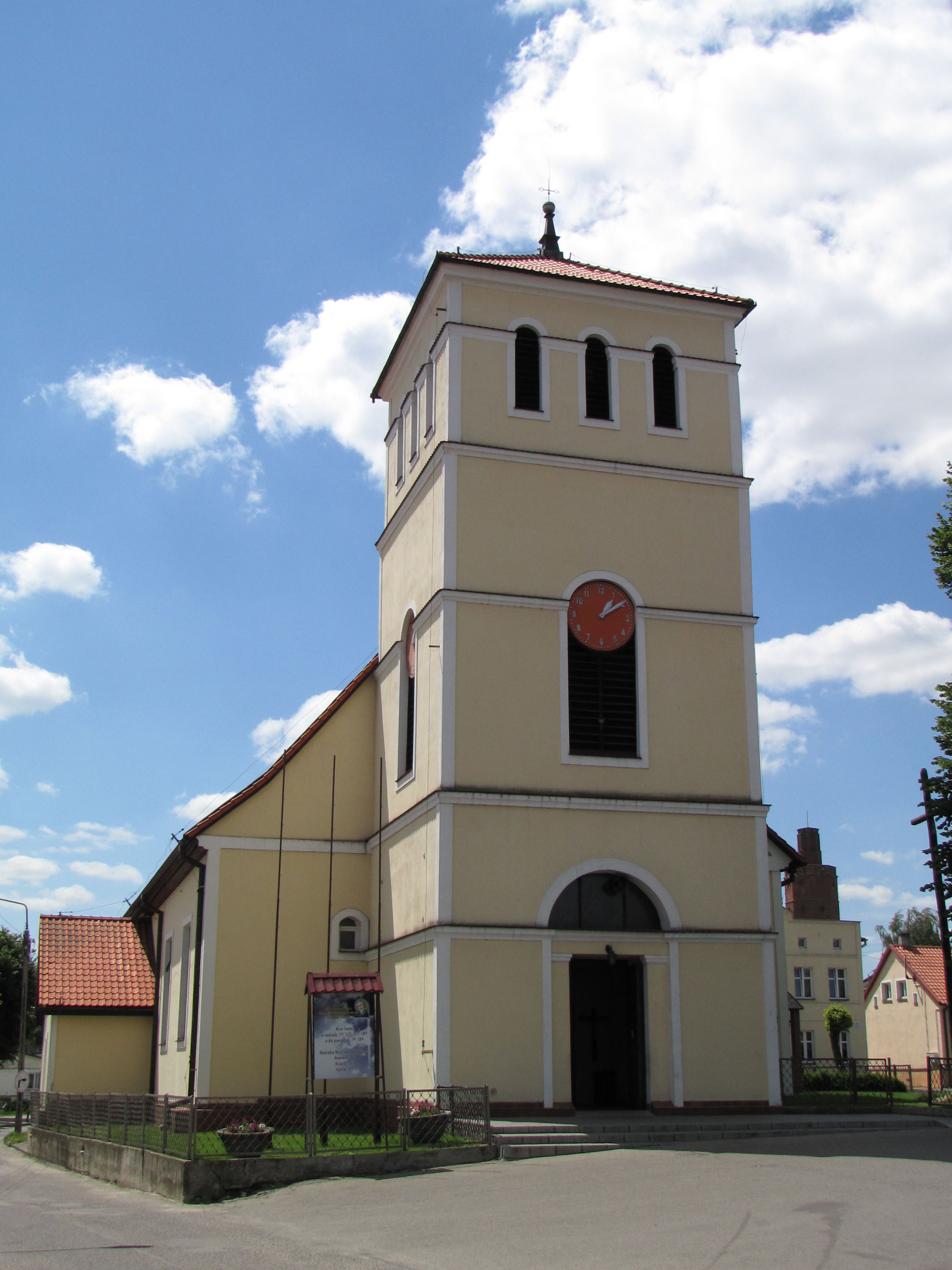
Baroque Saint Andrew Bobola church

It became part of the Kingdom of Prussia in 1701. In 1709–1711, there was a plague epidemic, which killed, according to various sources either 315 or 337 residents. Nonetheless, the economic development continued apace, and the settlement received its town charter in 1722 from King Frederick William I of Prussia. A royal resettlement program brought many new residents, especially artisans. Between 1756 and 1763, a new church, a 1.65 ha marketplace, a network of roads, and a new town hall were built. During the Seven Years' War, the town was occupied by Russian troops from 1758 to 1762. Afterwards, it became a garrison city for Prussian troops from 1764 to 1800.

In the Napoleonic Wars, Russia made the town a headquarters for their troops in 1807 for nine days, followed by French and Polish troops, demanding payment of their stationing costs, as well as bringing new sicknesses, which killed many residents. After the defeat of the French, the Prussians reorganized their territorial administration, and in 1818 the town was assigned to Landkreis Johannisburg in the Gumbinnen region. During the January Uprising, Polish insurgents from the Prussian Partition of Poland crossed the border to the Russian Partition in the area, and weapons were smuggled through the town to the Russian Partition. It became part of the German Empire in 1871 during the unification of Germany. In 1885 the railway line from Pisz to Ełk arrived in the town. At that time, the population was about 1,700, of whom 700 were Polish-speaking.

Historical population
Year	Pop.	±%
1871	1,637	—
1880	1,670	+2.0%
1890	1,819	+8.9%
1900	1,916	+5.3%
1910	2,149	+12.2%
1925	2,194	+2.1%
1939	2,623	+19.6%
1950	1,964	−25.1%
1960	2,707	+37.8%
2010	3,952	+46.0%

During World War I, combat between German and Russian troops happened near the town, which was entered by Russian troops and plundered. Under the terms of the Treaty of Versailles, the residents of the town voted 100% to remain in Weimar Germany. In 1927 and 1928, a new courthouse and waterworks were built. In 1938, as part of an extensive action of Germanization and elimination of names of Polish origin, the Nazis renamed the town to Gehlenburg. In the 1939 census, there were 2,823 residents. It was nearly abandoned in the face of the advancing Soviet front, which captured the city on January 23, 1945. A few weeks later, power was transferred to the new Polish administration. The town became again part of Poland under the Potsdam Agreement. The historic name Biała was restored and the adjective Piska was added, after the nearby town of Pisz, to distinguish the town from many other Polish settlements of the same name.

== Transport ==
National road no. 58 and voivodeship road no. 667 pass through the town. There is a railway station in the town.

== Sport ==
Znicz Biała Piska is a semi-professional football club with notable successes for a club and town of its size.

== Gallery ==
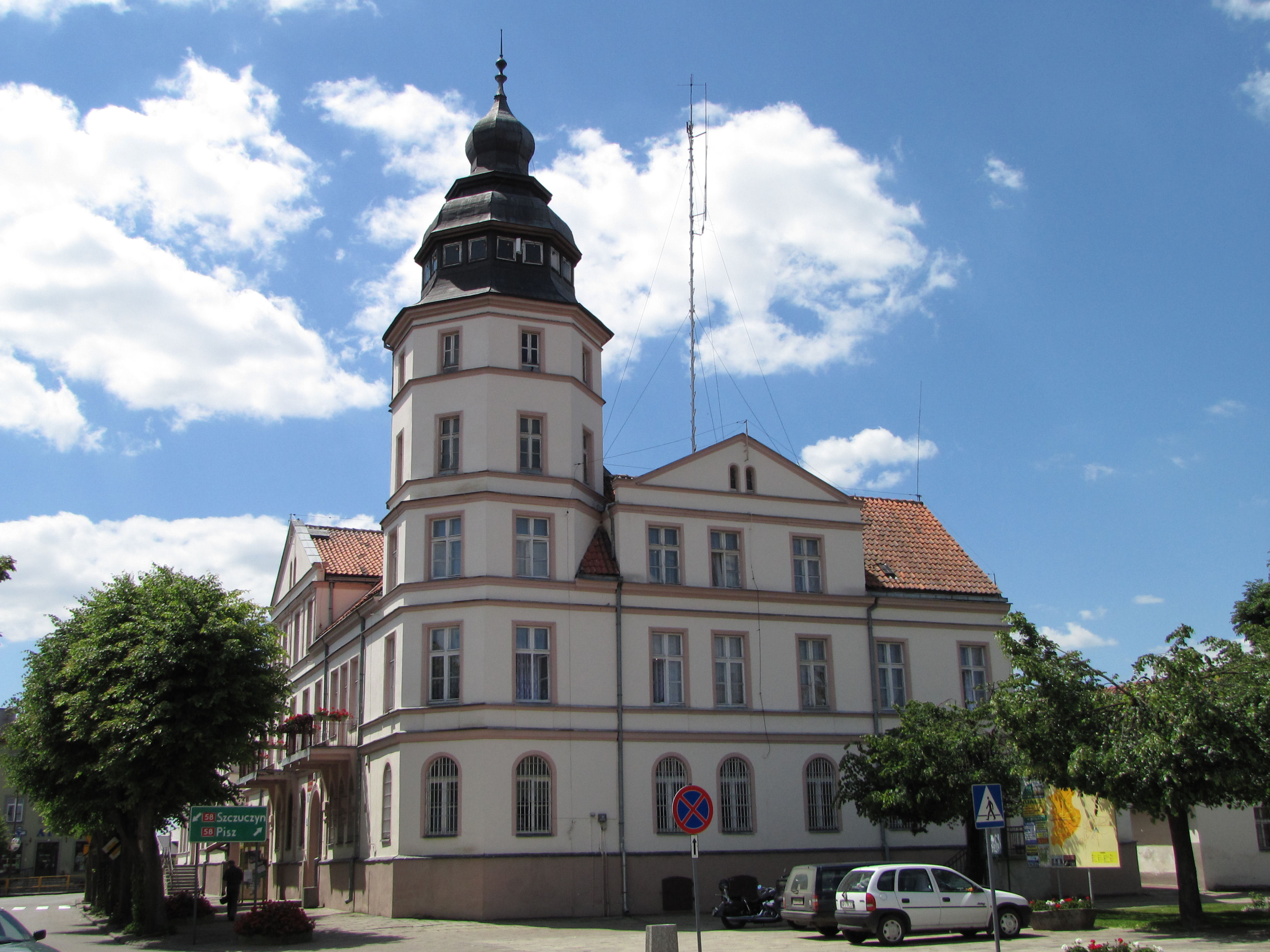
Town hall of Biała Piska

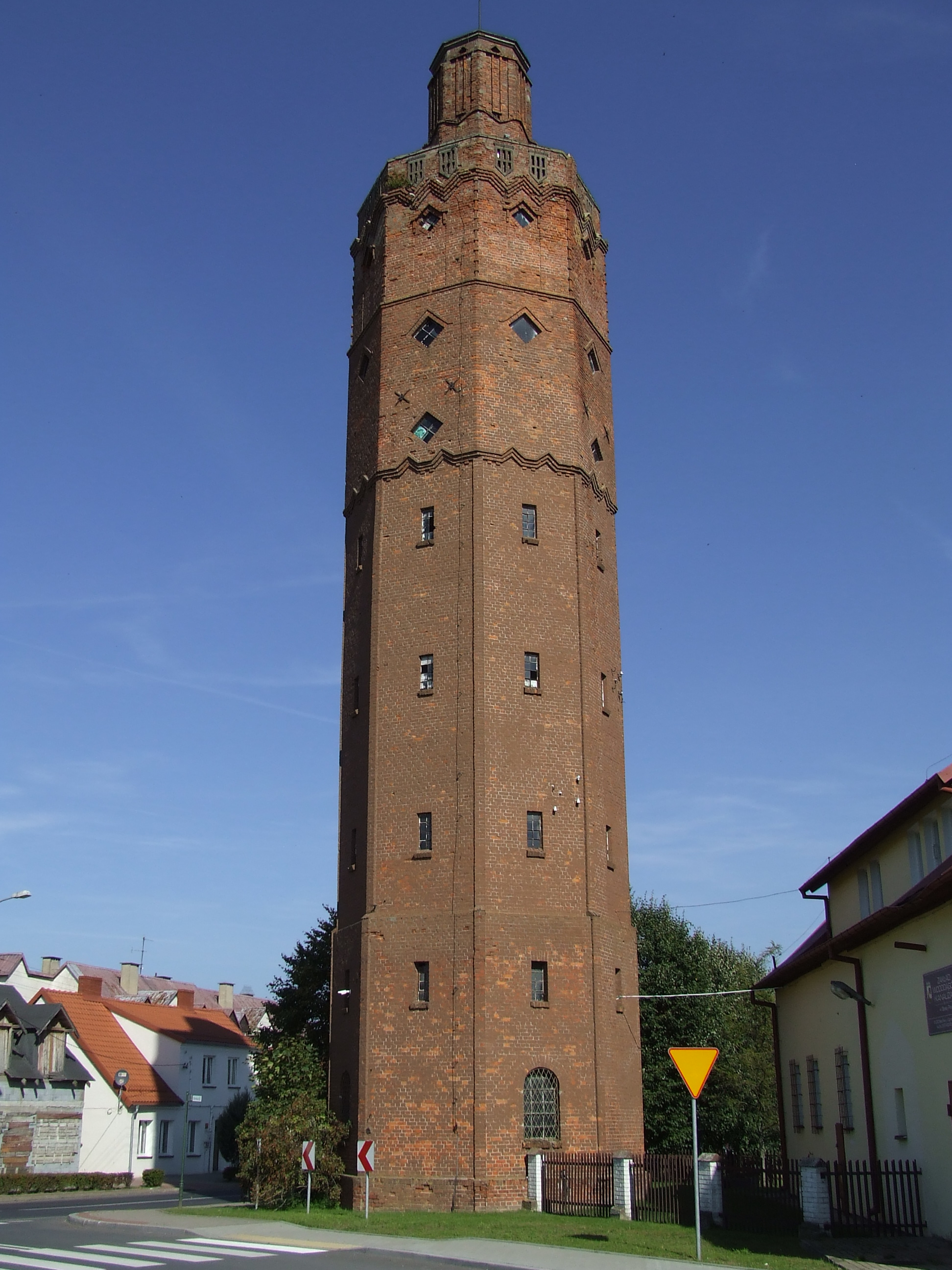
Old water tower in Biała Piska

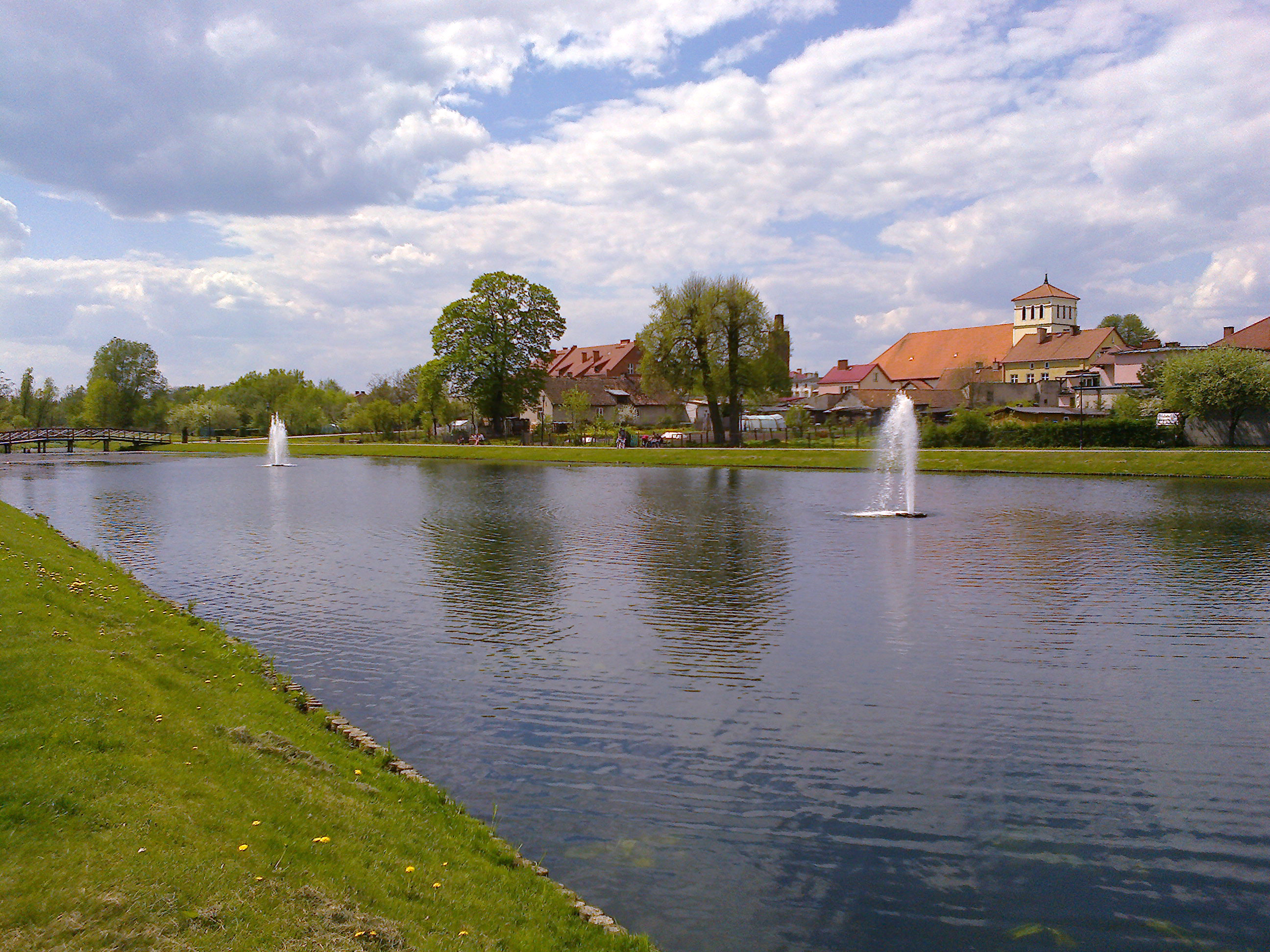
Białka River pond
