= Lipnik, Warmian-Masurian Voivodeship =

Lipnik
- Settlement
- Location within Poland
- Coordinates: 53°42′31″N 21°40′31″E
- Country: Poland
- Voivodeship: Warmian-Masurian
- County: Pisz
- Gmina: Ruciane-Nida

Lipnik (Polish pronunciation: [ˈlipɲik]) is a settlement in the administrative district of Gmina Ruciane-Nida, within Pisz County, Warmian-Masurian Voivodeship, in northern Poland.
