= Monastery of the Dormition of the Mother of God, Wojnowo =

Orthodox monastery in Wojnowo, Poland

Monastery of the Dormition of the Mother of God
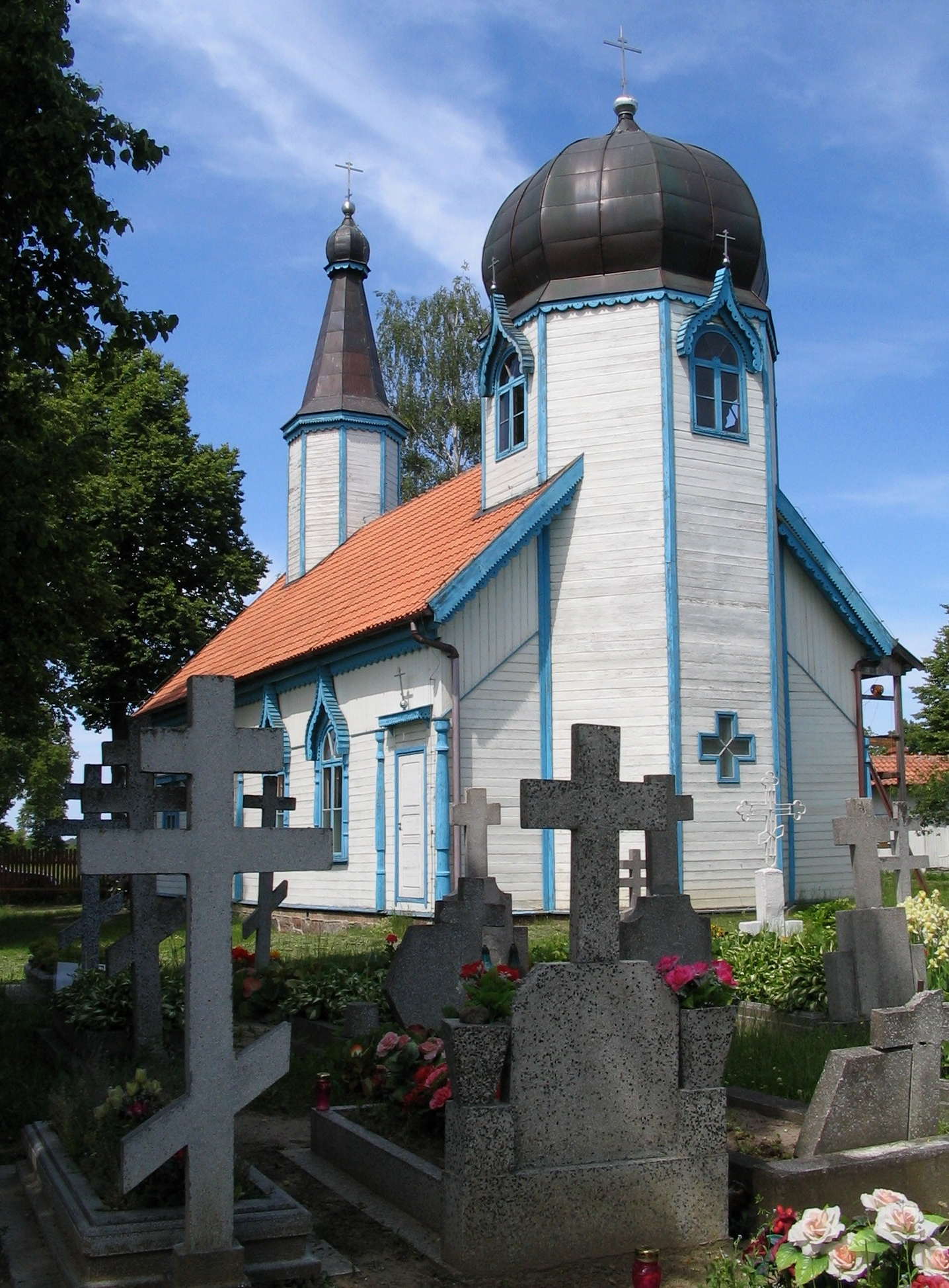
- Church in Wojnowo, serving simultaneously as a monastery and parish church

- Location within Poland
- Interactive map of Monastery of the Dormition of the Mother of God

Monastery information
- Controlled churches: Church of the Dormition of the Mother of God; Church of St. Ambrose of Optina and the Synaxis of Optina Elders

People
- Founders: Aleksandr Avayev; Sawa Hrycuniak (reactivation)

Architecture
- Completion date: 1935

Site
- Location: Wojnowo
- Country: Poland
- Coordinates: 53°40′03″N 21°29′07″E

The Monastery of the Dormition of the Mother of God is one of six women's monasteries under the jurisdiction of the Polish Orthodox Church. It is located in Wojnowo, within the Diocese of Białystok and Gdańsk.

The first women's monastic community in Wojnowo was established in 1935, inspired by Father Aleksandr Avayev, the local parson. The last nun from this group, rassophore Sister Ludmiła, moved to the monastery on Grabarka Holy Mount in 1956. Nearly 40 years later, efforts to revive the monastery were undertaken, and it resumed operations by decree of Archbishop Sawa of the Diocese of Białystok and Gdańsk. In its early years of revival, the community was dedicated to the Intercession of the Theotokos, a title changed in 2010 to the Dormition of the Mother of God.

== History ==
In 1913, Wojnowo recorded approximately 700 Old Believers-Bespopovtsy and over 200 Orthodox Christians. The Old Believers had arrived in the 19th century from Russia to what was then East Prussia, constructing a prayer house. Since 1848, the village hosted the Old Believer men's monastery, expanded between 1852 and 1857 by monk Pavel Ledniev, known as Pavel the Prussian. In the 1860s, this monk broke with the Bespopovtsy Old Believers' views, becoming a proponent of Edinoverie. An Edinoverie parish was established in Wojnowo in 1885.

=== Activities of Father Aleksandr Avayev ===
Between 1921 and 1923, Aleksandr Avayev, a former tsarist officer and later a rassophore monk at the Optina Monastery, revived the Orthodox parish in Wojnowo and built the Church of the Dormition of the Mother of God for its needs. His efforts were inspired by Metropolitan Eulogius Georgiyevsky of the Western European Exarchate of the Russian Orthodox Church, under whose jurisdiction East Prussia fell. Eulogius ordained Avayev as a priest in Berlin and sent him to Wojnowo, where a community of about 200 Edinoverie members remained. Father Avayev aimed to establish a women's monastery in Wojnowo, building a house for this purpose where several women settled, naming the community after the Intercession of the Theotokos. Accounts differ on how many members took perpetual monastic vows, with estimates ranging from two to ten nuns. Another version suggests Avayev gathered five candidates, but only one, Helena Koroniowa, took perpetual vows. The nuns and novices taught Orthodox children in Wojnowo and supported missionary work among the more numerous local Old Believers, aiding Avayev's efforts.

=== Post-World War II ===
After World War II, only two of the five nuns present in 1939 remained in the monastery. The last nun, rassophore Sister Ludmiła, left Wojnowo in 1956 following Father Avayev's death, joining the monastery on Grabarka Holy Mount. She later became a hegumenia and superior there.

Due to a significant decline in Wojnowo's Orthodox population, closing the parish was considered. Its survival hinged on the monastery's revival. The reactivation was organized by the Wojnowo parson, Father Bazyli Omieljańczyk, with rassophore novice Nina Sidorenko, a local who recalled Avayev's pre-war work. Official resumption of monastic life occurred on 15 April 1995, by order of Archbishop Sawa of Białystok and Gdańsk. The monastery's first superior was Hegumenia Ludmiła Polakowska, who served for a year but left due to health issues and the monastery's need for repairs. She was accompanied by several nuns from the Grabarka monastery. The monastery was initially dedicated to the Intercession of the Theotokos.

Subsequent superiors included Sister Elżbieta Niczyporuk, followed by Sister Agnia Cicha from December 1996 to the present, later elevated to hegumenia. On 1 September 1996, Archbishop Sawa rededicated the renovated Church of the Dormition of the Mother of God. The monastery saw its first small schema vows post-revival. Since 1997, the refurbished monastery has also housed the Church of Saint Ambrose of Optina and the Council of Holy Elders of Optina, honoring monks from the Optina Monastery where Avayev trained. In 1999, Optina monks donated relics of these saints to Wojnowo's nuns. By 2022, the community consisted of five nuns and two rassophore novices.

After its revival, Wojnowo became an Orthodox pilgrimage center. This prompted expansion efforts, as the current facilities cannot fully accommodate pilgrims or new candidates for monastic life. Between 2008 and 2012, a new residential building was constructed, dedicated on 14 October 2012, housing workshops and nuns' cells, funded by believers' donations. The monastery's dedication was also changed to the Dormition of the Mother of God.
