= Gmina Ruciane-Nida =

Gmina Ruciane-Nida Ruciane-Nida Commune
- Gmina
- Coat of arms
- Interactive map of Gmina Ruciane-Nida
- Coordinates (Ruciane-Nida): 53°38′33″N 21°32′57″E
- Country: Poland
- Voivodeship: Warmian-Masurian
- County: Pisz
- Seat: Ruciane-Nida

Area
  - Total: 357.74 km^{2} (138.12 sq mi)

Population (2006)
  - Total: 8,627
  - Density: 24.12/km^{2} (62.46/sq mi)
  - Urban: 4,894
  - Rural: 3,733
- Website: http://www.ruciane-nida.pl/

Gmina Ruciane-Nida is an urban-rural gmina (administrative district) in Pisz County, Warmian-Masurian Voivodeship, in northern Poland. Its seat is the town of Ruciane-Nida, which lies approximately 17 kilometres (11 mi) west of Pisz and 71 km (44 mi) east of the regional capital Olsztyn.

The gmina covers an area of 357.74 square kilometres (138.1 sq mi), and as of 2006 its total population is 8,627 (out of which the population of Ruciane-Nida amounts to 4,894, and the population of the rural part of the gmina is 3,733).

The gmina contains part of the protected area called Masurian Landscape Park.

== Villages ==
Apart from the town of Ruciane-Nida, Gmina Ruciane-Nida contains the villages and settlements of Bartlewo, Borek, Gałkowo, Gąsior, Głodowo, Iwanowo, Iznota, Jeleń, Kadzidłowo, Kamień, Karwica, Karwica Mazurska, Kokoszka, Końcewo, Krzyże, Ładne Pole, Lipnik, Lisiczyn, Majdan, Maskulińskie, Niedźwiedzi Róg, Nowa Ukta, Oko, Onufryjewo, Osiniak-Piotrowo, Piaski, Pieczysko, Popielno, Pranie, Ruczaj, Śwignajno, Śwignajno Wielkie, Szeroki Bór, Ukta, Warnowo, Wejsuny, Wejsuny-Leśniczówka, Wierzba, Wojnowo, Wólka, Wygryny, Wypad, Zameczek, Zamordeje, Zaroślak and Zdrużno.

== Neighbouring gminas ==
Gmina Ruciane-Nida is bordered by the gminas of Mikołajki, Piecki, Pisz, Rozogi and Świętajno.
