= Ukta =

- Village
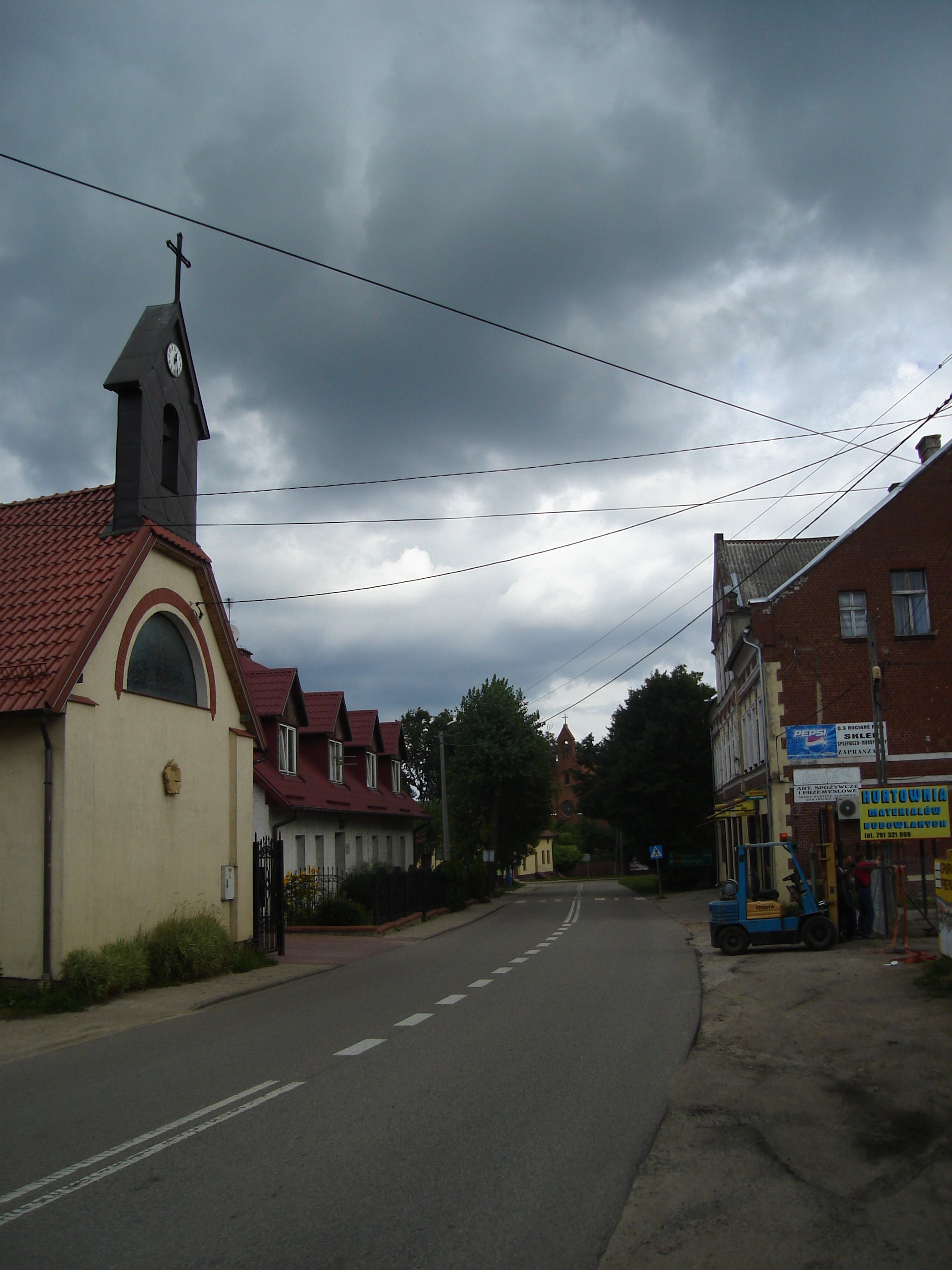

- Location within Poland
- Coordinates: 53°41′18″N 21°29′46″E
- Country: Poland
- Voivodeship: Warmian-Masurian
- County: Pisz
- Gmina: Ruciane-Nida
- Population: 570

Ukta [ˈukta] is a village in the administrative district of Gmina Ruciane-Nida, within Pisz County, Warmian-Masurian Voivodeship, in northern Poland.

The village is situated on the Krutynia river of Masurian Lake District.

On April 5, 1981, the local Protestant church was charged and forcefully taken over by Catholics.

The village has a population of 570.
