= Głodowo, Pisz County =

Głodowo
- Village
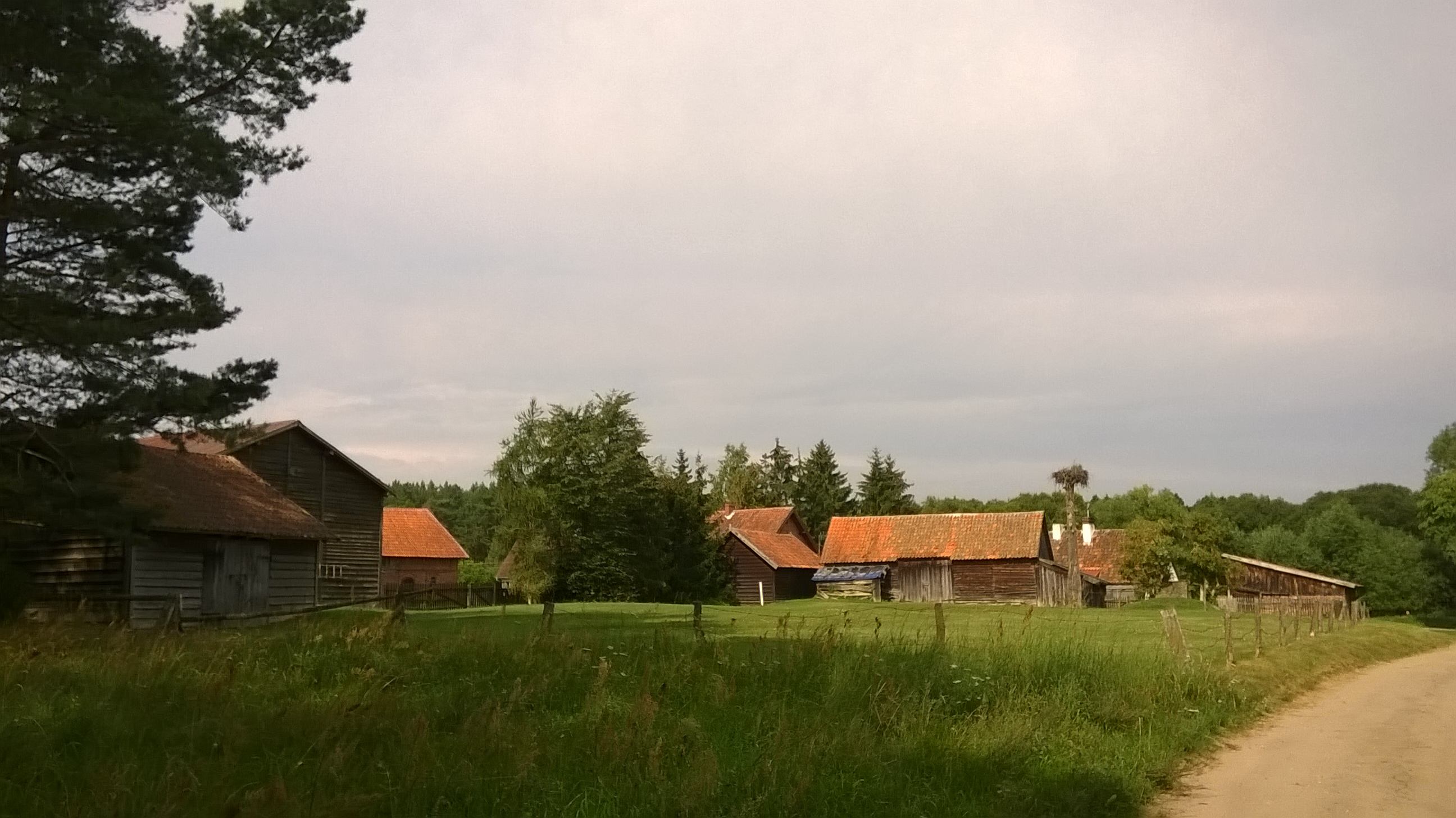

- Location within Poland
- Coordinates: 53°43′13″N 21°39′48″E
- Country: Poland
- Voivodeship: Warmian-Masurian
- County: Pisz
- Gmina: Ruciane-Nida
- Population: 70

Głodowo [ɡwɔˈdɔvɔ] (German : Glodowen) is a village in the administrative district of Gmina Ruciane-Nida, within Pisz County, Warmian-Masurian Voivodeship, in northern Poland.
