= Pisz County =

Pisz County Powiat piski
- County
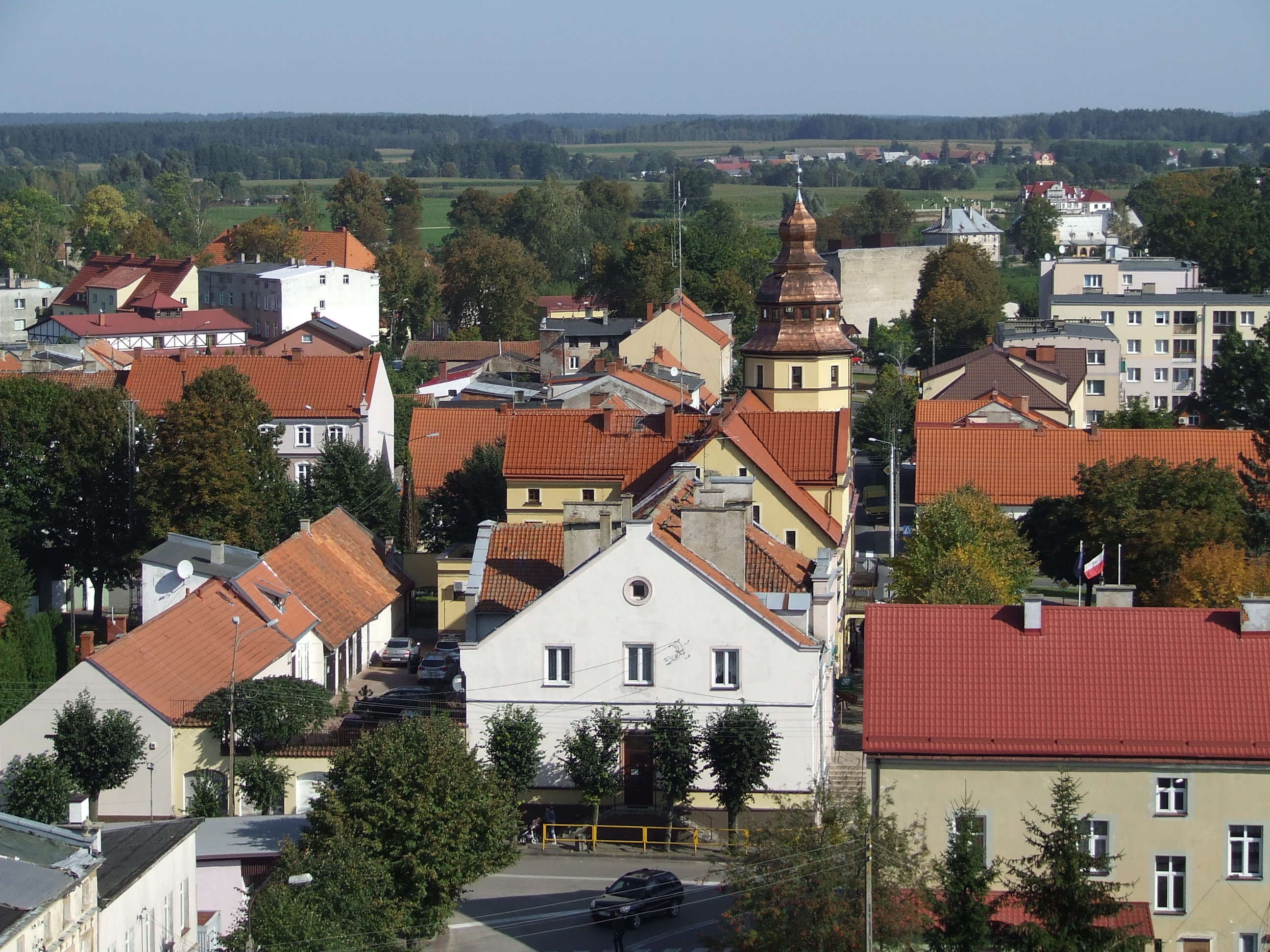
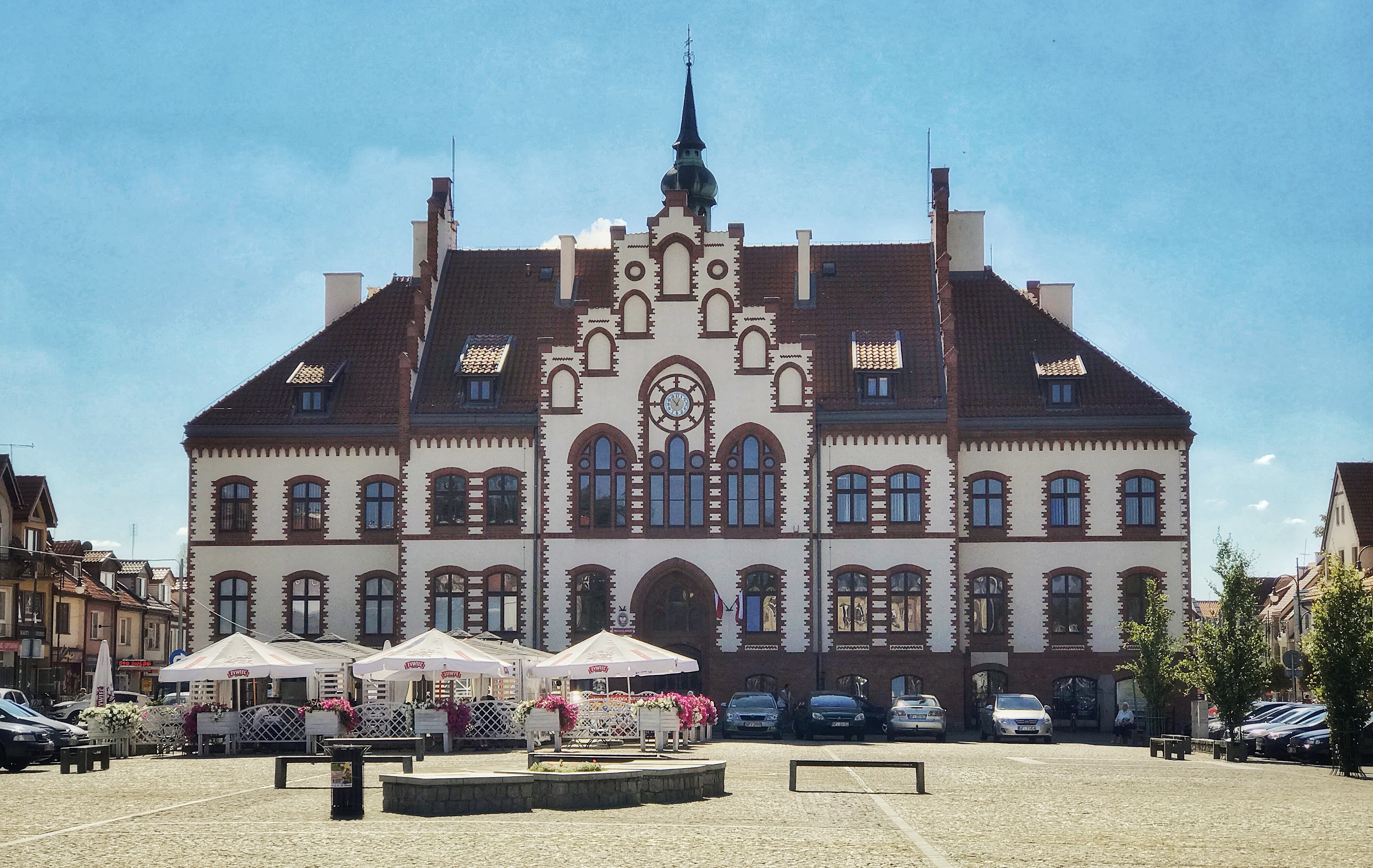
- Bełdany Lake Biała Piska Pisz town hall Polish Armed Forces Day Parade in Orzysz Nidzkie Lake

- Flag Coat of arms

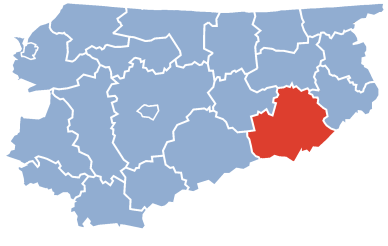
- Location within the voivodeship

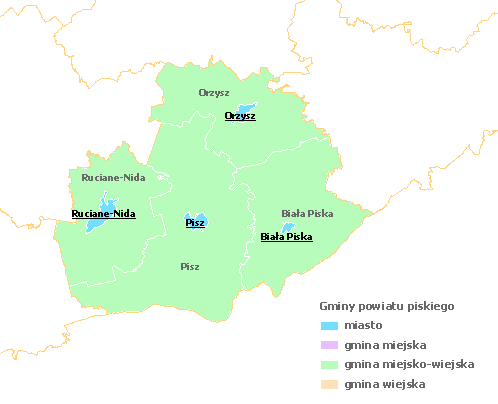
- Division into gminas
- Coordinates (Pisz): 53°37′N 21°48′E
- Country: Poland
- Voivodeship: Warmian-Masurian
- Seat: Pisz
- Gminas: Total 4: Gmina Biała Piska; Gmina Orzysz; Gmina Pisz; Gmina Ruciane-Nida

Area
  - Total: 1,776.17 km^{2} (685.78 sq mi)

Population (2006)
  - Total: 57,553
  - Density: 32.403/km^{2} (83.923/sq mi)
  - Urban: 34,036
  - Rural: 23,517
- Time zone: UTC+1 (CET)
  - Summer (DST): UTC+2 (CEST)
- Car plates: NPI
- Website: www.powiat.pisz.pl

Pisz County (Polish: powiat piski) is a unit of territorial administration and local government (powiat) in Warmian-Masurian Voivodeship, north-eastern Poland. It came into being on 1 January 1999 as a result of the Polish local government reforms passed in 1998. Its administrative seat and largest town is Pisz, which lies 88 kilometres (55 mi) east of the regional capital Olsztyn. The county contains three other towns: Orzysz, 24 km (15 mi) north-east of Pisz, Ruciane-Nida, 17 km (11 mi) west of Pisz, and Biała Piska, 18 km (11 mi) east of Pisz.

The county covers an area of 1,776.17 square kilometres (685.8 sq mi). As of 2006 its total population is 57,553, out of which the population of Pisz is 19,332, that of Orzysz is 5,804, that of Ruciane-Nida is 4,894, that of Biała Piska is 4,006, and the rural population is 23,517.

== Neighbouring counties ==
Pisz County is bordered by Giżycko County to the north, Ełk County and Grajewo County to the east, Kolno County and Ostrołęka County to the south, Szczytno County to the west, and Mrągowo County to the north-west.

== Administrative divisions ==
The county is subdivided into four gminas (all urban-rural, centred on the four towns). These are listed in the following table, in descending order of population.

Gmina	Type	Area (km^{2})	Population (2006)	Seat
Gmina Pisz	urban-rural	634.8	27,224	Pisz
Gmina Biała Piska	urban-rural	420.1	12,135	Biała Piska
Gmina Orzysz	urban-rural	363.5	9,567	Orzysz
Gmina Ruciane-Nida	urban-rural	357.7	8,627	Ruciane-Nida
