= Flag of Masuria =

Flag of the Masuria region of Poland

- Adopted: 1829
- Design: Divided into blue, white, and red stripes

The flag that is used as the symbol of Masuria, a region in Poland, and the Masurian people, is divided horizontally into three stripes, that are, blue, white, and red. It was created in 1829, and popularly used until 1945, ever since existing as an obscure symbol, with some modern attempts of its revival.

== Design ==
The flag was divided horizontally into three equally-sized stripes, blue, white, and red. Until 1882, it used dark blue, which was then replaced with lighter shade. The blue colours symbolized freedom, equality, and fraternity.

== History ==
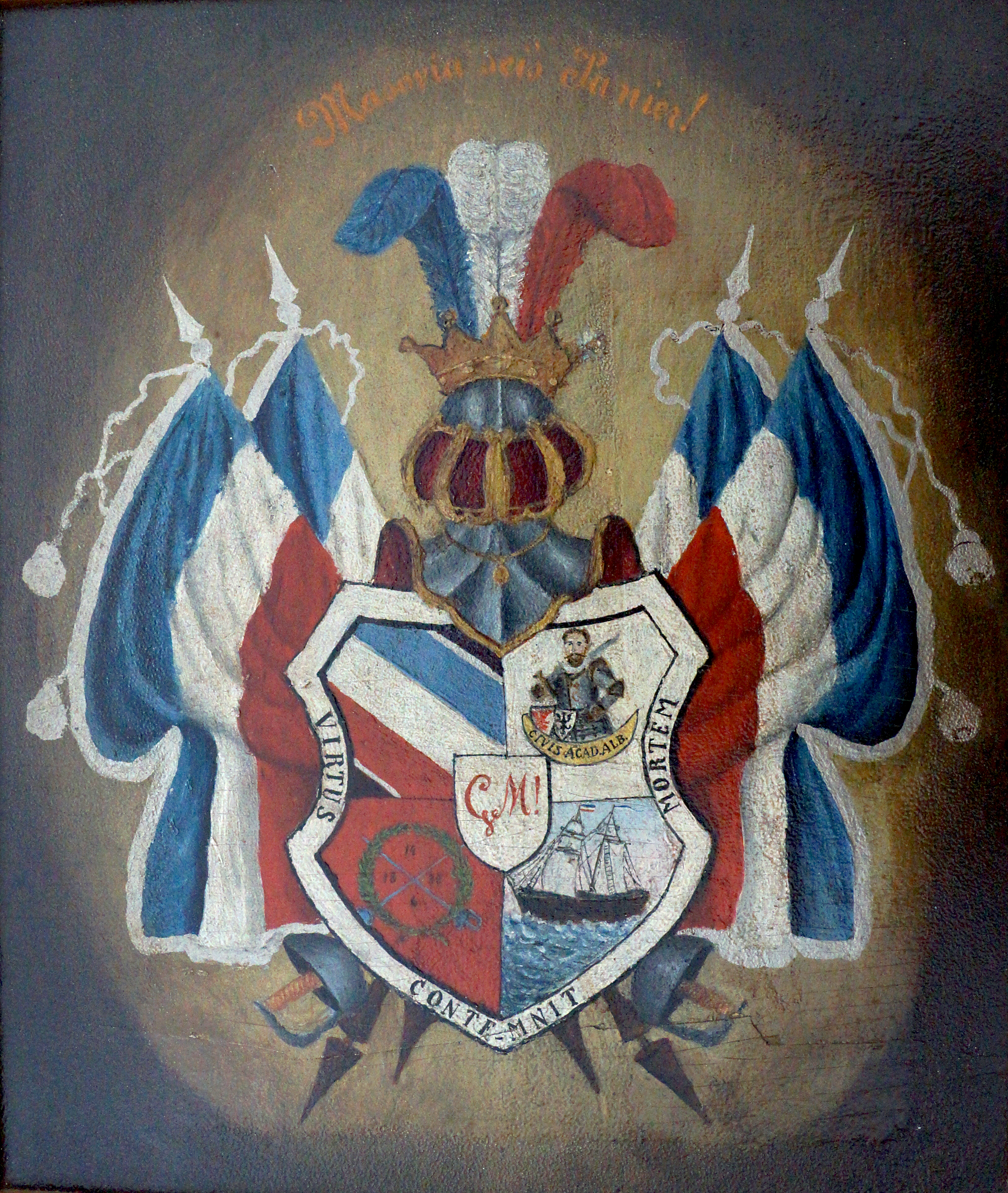
The full coat of arms of the Corps Masovia Königsberg.

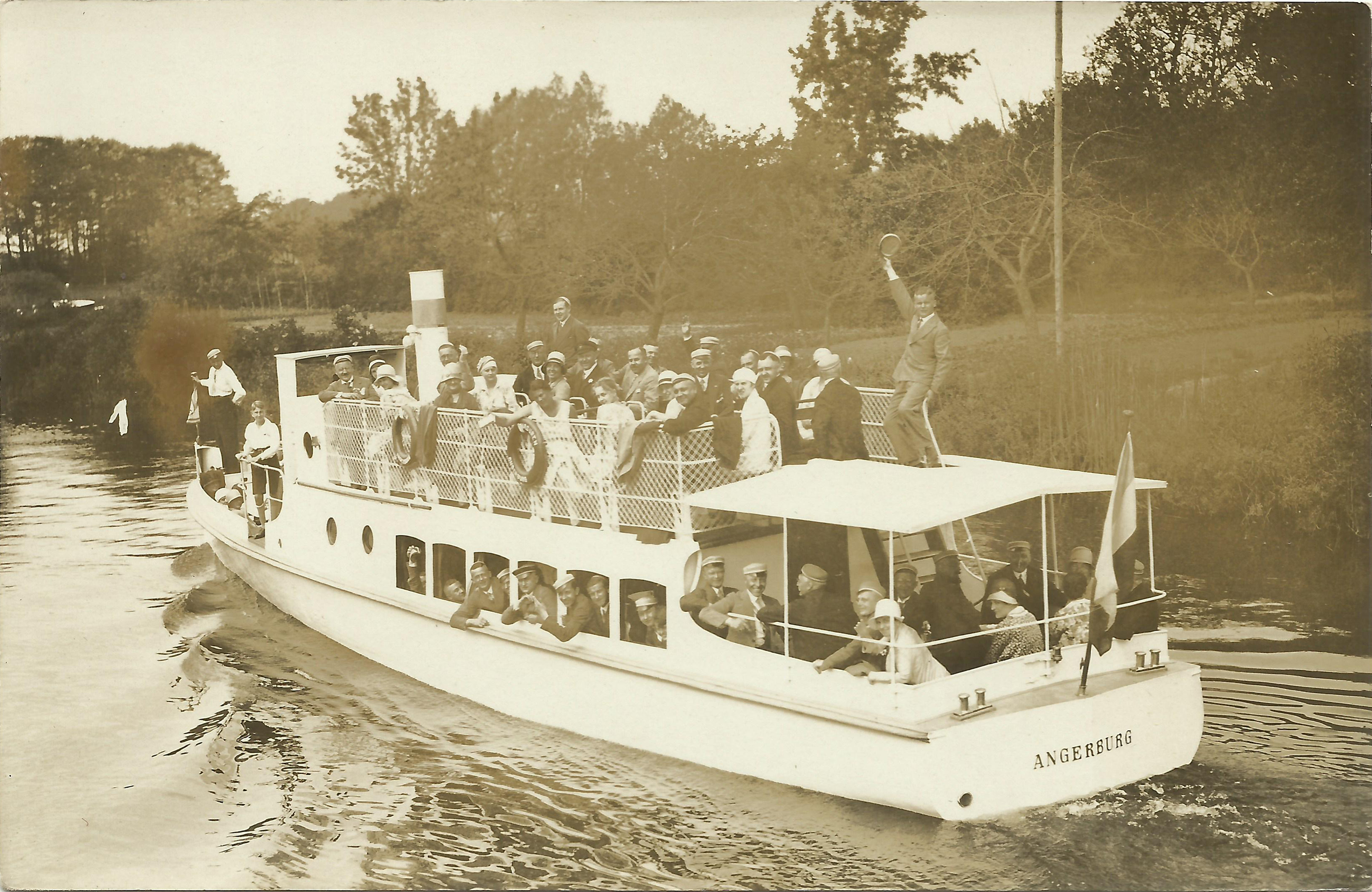
The flag of Masuria flown on the boat in 1929.

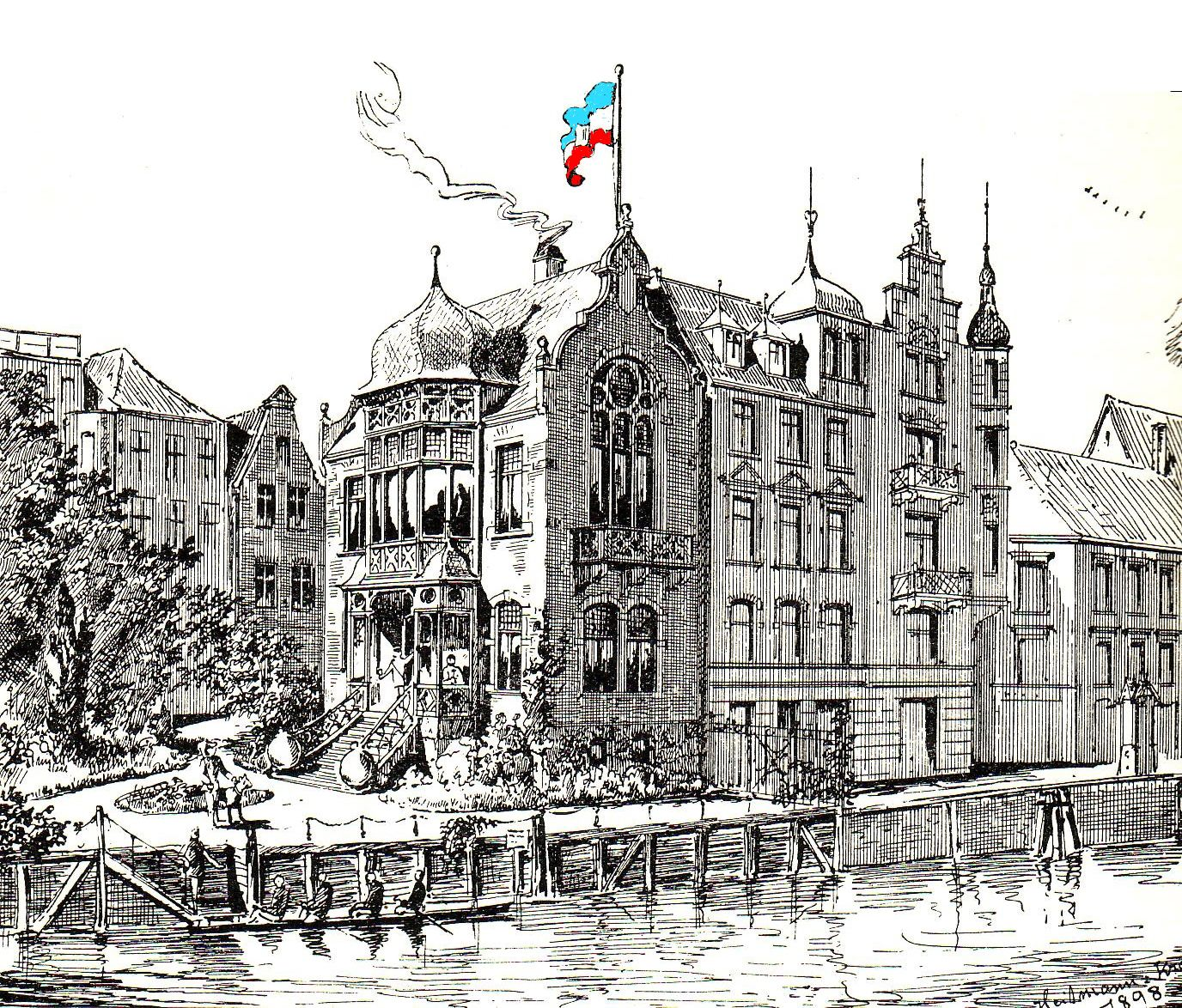
The 1929 illustration depicting the Corps Masovia headquarters in Königsberg, flying the flag of Masuria.

The flag of Masuria was created in 1829, as the banner of the Corps Masovia Königsberg, a student corp, at the University of Königsberg, in Königsberg, East Prussia (now Kaliningrad, Russia), that functioned as the student association of students from the region of Masuria. The design was inspired by the French tricolour flag, and the colours stood for freedom, equality, and fraternity. The flag was created before the Prague Slavic Congress in 1848, at which pan-Slavic colors were adopted. The Corps Masovia Königsberg functioned until 28 October 1935, when it was dissolved from the orders of Nazi Party. It was reestablished in 2001, in Potsdam, Germany.

In the following decades the flag begun gaining popularity among Masurian people, since 1850s being hang during various events and holidays, eventually gaining huge popularity around 1875. The flag remained in general use until 1945, when in the aftermath of World War II, the expulsion of the German population from the region, then annexed into Poland. Following that the flag had fallen into obscurity. Nowadays, some organizations are attempting the revival of the flag usage in the Warmian-Masurian Voivodeship, Poland.

== See also ==
- Flag of the Warmian-Masurian Voivodeship
