= Flag of the Warmian–Masurian Voivodeship =

Flag of theWarmian–Masurian Voivodeship, Poland

Warmian–Masurian Voivodeship
- Use: Warmian–Masurian Voivodeship
- Adopted: 6 August 2002
- Design: Red flag with a white boundary on its top, bottom, and right sides, and with the head of a white (silver) eagle, with yellow (golden) beak, and an eye, wearing a yellow (golden) crown, located on its left side

The flag of the Warmian–Masurian Voivodeship, is red with a white boundary on its top, bottom, and right sides, and with the head of a white (silver) eagle, with yellow (golden) beak, and an eye, wearing a yellow (golden) crown, located on its left side. It was adopted in 2002.

== Design ==
The flag of the Warmian–Masurian Voivodeship is a red rectangular piece of material, that ends into the shape of a triangle on the right side of the flag. Its aspect ratio of height to width, of the right and top sides, equals 1:2. The bottom left corner of the flag, located at the half of the length of the top side of the flag, curves under the shape of the 1/8 of the circle, which height equals the height of the flag. The top, bottom, and right boundaries of the flag are made of the white line which height equals 1/10 of the height of the flag. The left side of the flag features the head of a white (silver) eagle, with yellow (golden) beak, and an eye, wearing a yellow (golden) crown.

== History ==
=== Flag of Masuria ===
The flag of Masuria, popularly used between 1829 and 1945.

The flag of Masuria was divided horizontally into three equally-sized stripes, blue, white, and red. It was created in 1829, as the banner of the Corps Masovia Königsberg, a German Student Corps, at the University of Königsberg, in Königsberg, East Prussia (now Kaliningrad, Russia), that functioned as the student association of students from the historical region of Masuria. The design was inspired by the colour of the French Revolution, and the colours stood for freedom, equality, and fraternity.

In the following decades the flag begun gaining popularity among Masurian people, since 1850s being hang during various events and holidays, eventually gaining huge popularity around 1875. The flag remained in general use until 1945, when in the aftermath of World War II, the expulsion of the German population from the region, then annexed into Poland. Following that the flag had fallen into obscurity. Nowadays, some organizations are attempting the revival of the flag usage in the Warmian–Masurian Voivodeship, Poland.

=== Flag of East Prussia ===
The flag of East Prussia, used from 1882 to 1935.

Prior to the establishment of the modern Warmian–Masurian Voivodeship, from 18th to 20th century, the region was administrated as part of East Prussia, a province of Prussia. On 22 October 1882, the province established its flag, which was divided into two equally-sized horizontal stripes, that were, black and white. The aspect ratio of the flag's height to its wight was equal 2:3. The flag was used until 1935, when Nazi Germany forbid its provinces from using its flags, ordering them to replace them with the national flag.

=== Flag of the Warmian–Masurian Voivodeship ===
The modern Warmian–Masurian Voivodeship had been established in 1999. Its flag had been adopted by the Warmian–Masurian Voivodeship on 6 August 2002. The flag, as well as the voivodeship coat of arms, were designed by Paweł Dudziński. Their design had been criticized by the Heraldic Commission of Poland, and was not approved by the Minister of Culture and National Heritage of Poland.

== See also ==
- coat of arms of the Warmian–Masurian Voivodeship
- flag of Masuria
- flag of Prussia
- list of non-rectangular flags
