= Diamond vault =

Form of vault church architecture

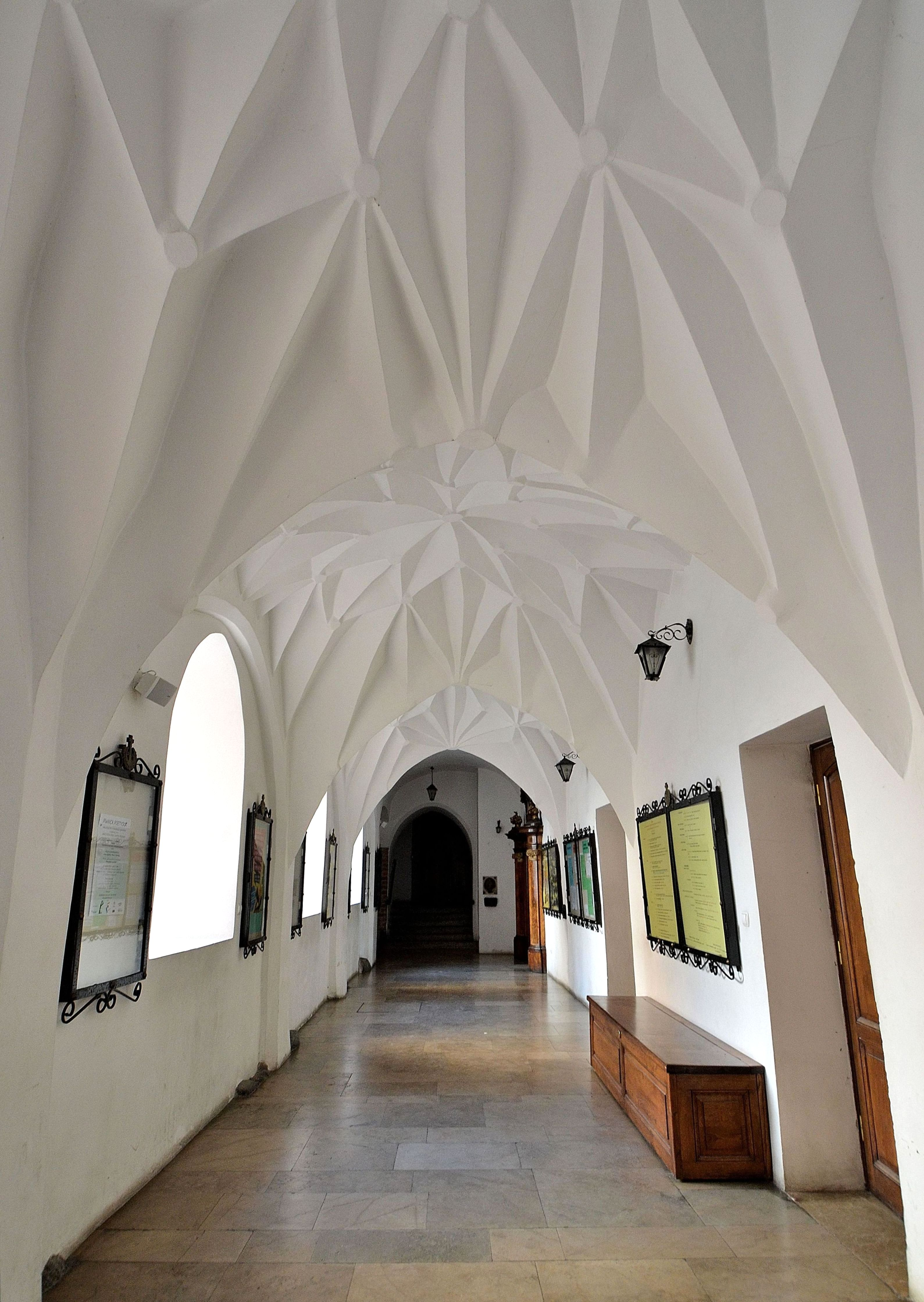
A diamond vault at the former Bernardine monastery in Warsaw (1514)

A diamond vault is a form of vault church architecture used in the Late Gothic and Renaissance style, which is based on an elaborate system of cavernous vaults in a manner resembling diamonds. It was widely used especially in Central European countries.

Diamond vaults are concave-convex ceilings so complex that, as their name suggests, they invoke the facets of a cut gemstone. First appearing in 1471 at Albrechtsburg castle in Meissen, Germany, they were employed for almost a century in locations as far apart as Gdańsk on the Baltic to Bechyně in Southern Bohemia (today's Czech Republic).

From the historical point of view, diamond vaults show the continuing vitality of the Gothic architecture in Central Europe, at a time when the rediscovery of the classical past in Renaissance Italy was changing the course of building. Architecturally, they offer some of the most impressive examples of geometrical experimentation and versatility in both secular and sacred spaces.

The design of diamond vaults involved an understanding of how the whole interior is shaped through a correlation of its geometry, spatial composition and support system. The vaults have the ability visually to integrate or to compartmentalise interiors, to make them appear to expand through seamless recession or to diminish them by the presence of claustrophobic, heavily projecting ridges. They can add an element of playful irregularity to symmetrical spaces, or conversely can harmonise oddly shaped interiors. Their plasticity is enhanced by the contrasting play of light and dark across their surfaces.

Diamond vaults are among the most original, yet least-known, creations of the Medieval architecture.

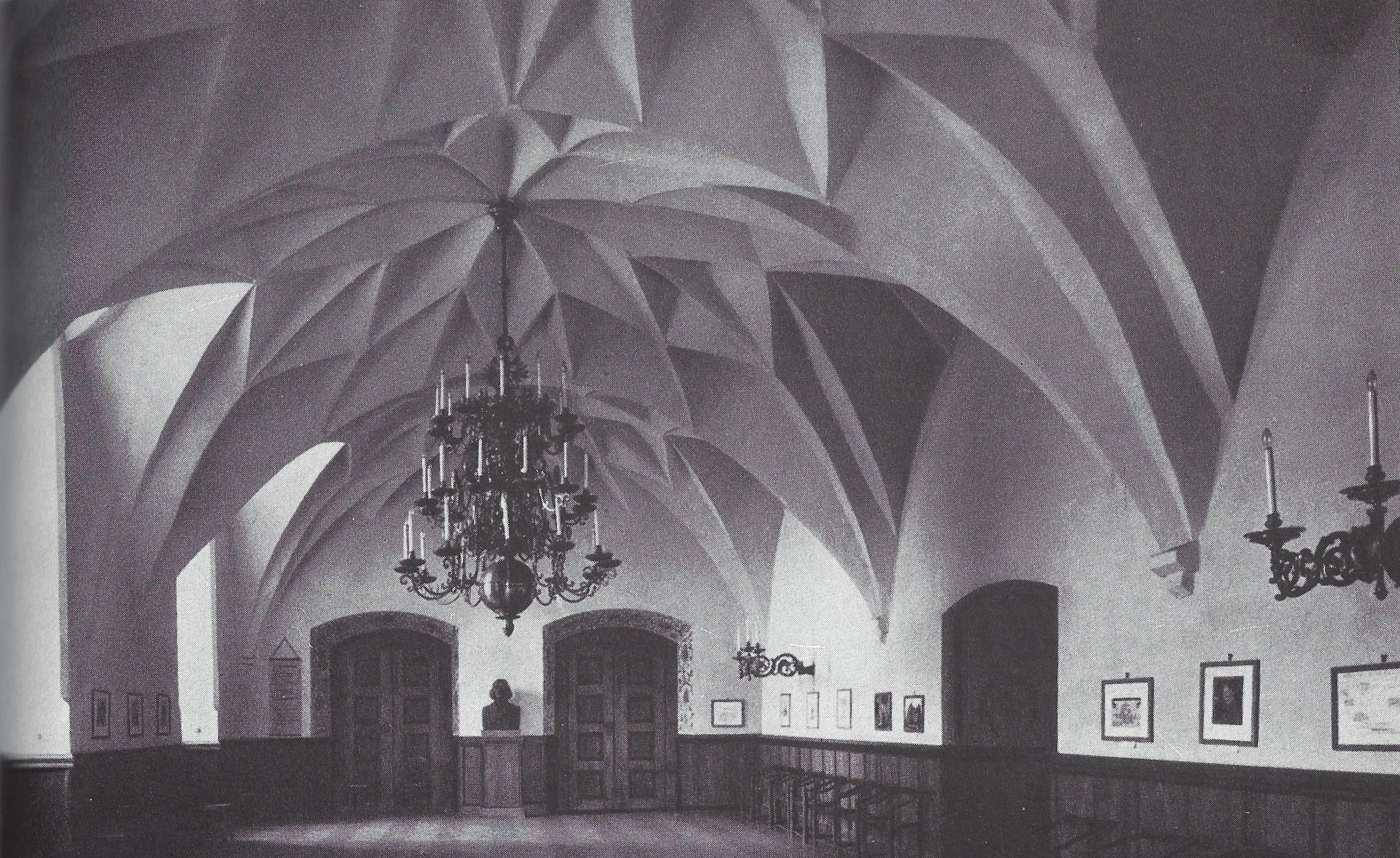
Diamond vaulting in Olsztyn Castle.

== See also ==
- List of architectural vaults
