= Nidka =

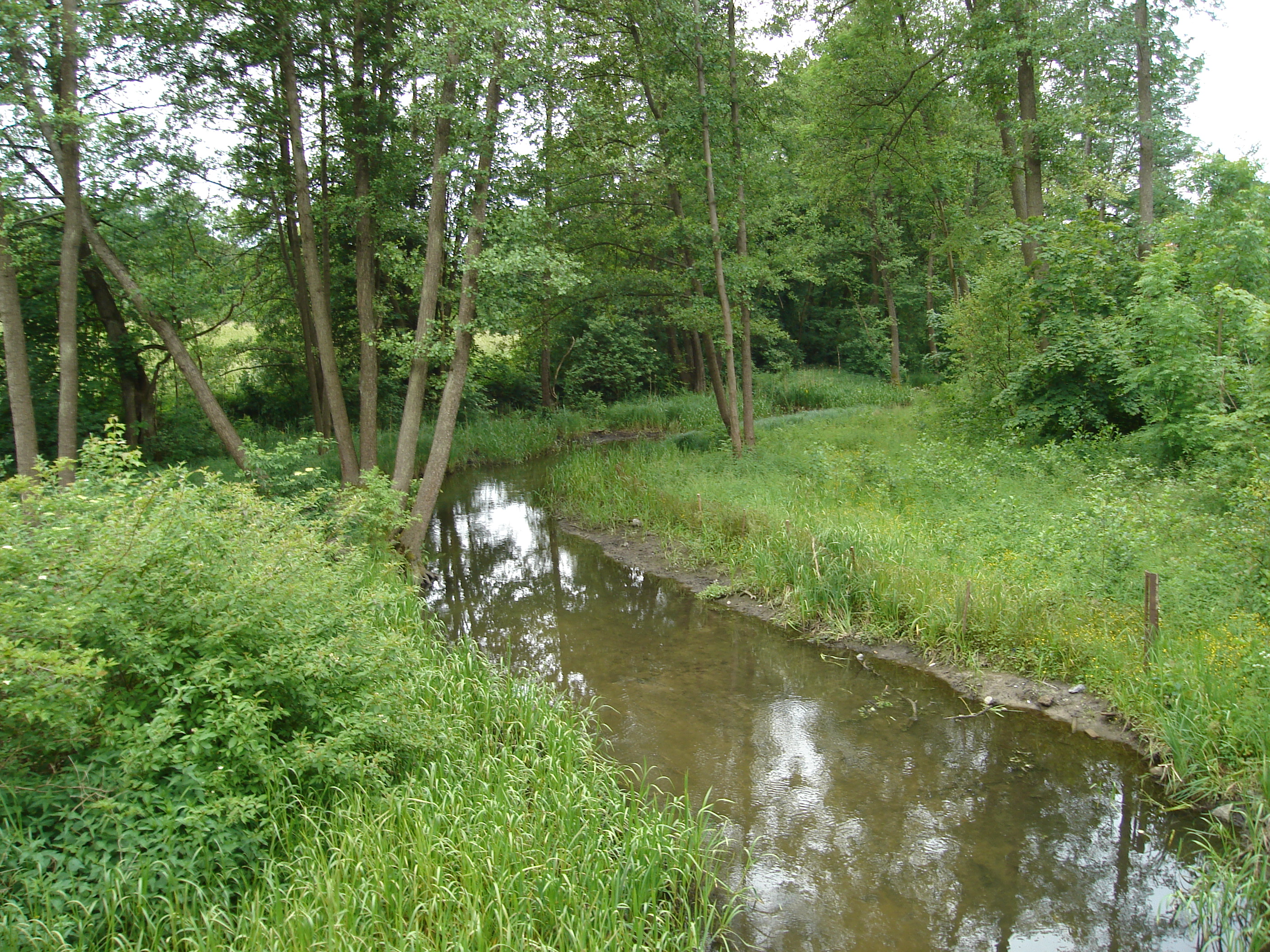
- Nidka flowing through Ruciane-Nida

Location
- Country: Poland
- Voivodeship: Warmian–Masurian
- County (Powiat): Pisz
- Gmina: Gmina Ruciane-Nida

Physical characteristics
- Source: Nidzkie Lake
  - location: northern lake shore, near Ruciane-Nida village
  - coordinates: 53°38′14″N 21°32′36″E
- Mouth: Bełdany
  - location: lake shore east of Wygryny
  - coordinates: 53°41′05″N 21°33′21″E
- Length: 14 km (8.7 mi)

Basin features
- Progression: Bełdany→ Lake Roś→ Pisa→ Narew→ Vistula→ Baltic Sea

Nidka is a small river of Poland. It connects the lakes Bełdany and Nidzkie.
