= Coat of arms of the Warmian–Masurian Voivodeship =

Polish coat of arms

- Armiger: Warmian–Masurian Voivodeship
- Shield: Red Iberian style escutcheon

The coat of arms of the Warmian–Masurian Voivodeship, Poland consists of a red Iberian style escutcheon (shield) that is divided horizontally into two parts. The top part features a white eagle with a yellow (golden) crown on its head. The bottom part is divided vertically into two fields. The left bottom field depicting a Lamb of God, in a form of a white (silver) sheep with a yellow (golden) circular aureola behind its head, holding in its right hoof, a yellow (golden) cross with a white (silver) banner with red cross on it, attached to it, and bleeding from its chest, with the red drops of blood falling towards a yellow (golden) chalice placed in front of it, between its legs. The right bottom field depicts a black eagle with a yellow (golden) crown put on its neck, and a capital letter S placed on its chest.

The coat of arms was designed by designed by Paweł Dudziński, and adopted in 2002.

== Design ==
The coat of arms of the Warmian–Masurian Voivodeship consists of a red Iberian style escutcheon (shield) with square top and rounded base, that is divided horizontally into two parts. The top part features a white (silver) eagle with long outstretched wings. It wears a yellow (golden) crown on its head, and has yellow (golden) beak, eye, and legs. On each of its wings, there is a yellow (golden) upwards-curved bar, stretched from its chest to the end of its wings, ended in a trefoil. It is based on an eagle used as the symbol of Poland, during the rule of Władysław II Jagiełło, who was the king of Poland from 1386 to 1434.

The coat of arms of the Roman Catholic Archdiocese of Warmia.

Historical coat of arms of the Duchy of Prussia which existed from 1525 to 1657.

The bottom part of the coat of arms is divided vertically into two fields. The left field features the Lamb of God, in a form of a white (silver) sheep with a yellow (golden) circular aureola with a red cross within it, behind its head. In its front right hove, it holds a yellow (golden) cross with a white (silver) banner with red cross on it, attached to it. It bleeds from its chest, with the red drops of blood falling towards a yellow (golden) chalice placed in front of it, between its legs. It is based on the coat of arms of the historical region of Warmia, more precisely the Prince-Bishopric of Warmia, and the Roman Catholic Archdiocese of Warmia, with the Lamb of God being one of the regional symbols since the 14th century.

The right bottom field features a black eagle with risen wings, and its head turned to its right. It wears a yellow (golden) crown on its neck, and has a yellow (golden) beak and legs, and a white eye. On its chest it has a yellow (golden) capital letter S on its chest, which refers to Sigismund I the Old, king of Poland from 1506 to 1548. On each of its wings, there is a yellow (golden) upwards-curved bar, stretched from its chest to the end of its wings, ended in a trefoil. The eagle is based on the coat of arms of the Duchy of Prussia which existed from 1525 to 1657. King Sigismund I the Old had established said design in the 16th century. It is sometimes attributed to the historical region of Masuria.

== History ==
The coat of arms was designed by Paweł Dudziński, and adopted by the Warmian–Masurian Voivodeship on 6 August 2002. Its design had been criticized by the Heraldic Commission of Poland, and was not approved by the Minister of Culture and National Heritage of Poland.

== See also ==
- flag of the Warmian–Masurian Voivodeship
- coat of arms of Prussia
