= Olsztyn Castle =

- Zamek Kapituły Warmińskiej w Olsztynie (Polish)
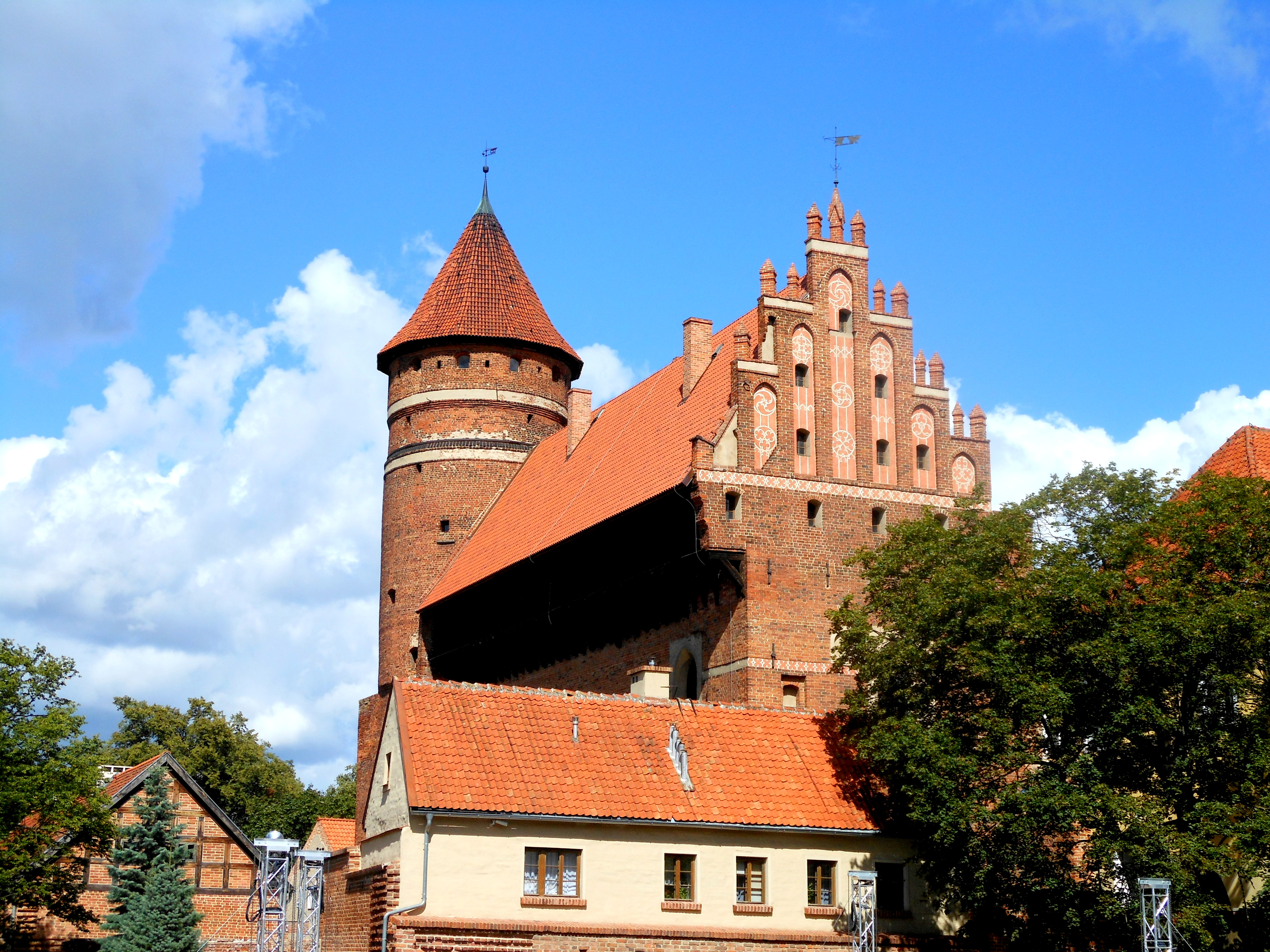
- Castle of Warmian Cathedral Chapter in Olsztyn

- Location of the Olsztyn Castle in Poland Olsztyn Castle (Warmian-Masurian Voivodeship)
- 53°46′N 20°28′E
- Type: Castle
- Location: Olsztyn, Warmian-Masurian Voivodeship, Poland

History
- Built: 1346-1353

Site notes
- Architectural style: Brick Gothic

Historic Monument of Poland
- Designated: 2023-09-08
- Reference no.: Dz. U. z 2023 r. poz. 1967

The Olsztyn Castle, officially the Castle of Warmian Cathedral Chapter in Olsztyn (Polish: Zamek Kapituły Warmińskiej w Olsztynie), is a Brick Gothic castle located in the heart of Olsztyn, in northern Poland. Built in the 14th century, it served as the seat for administrators of property of the Warmian Cathedral Chapter. The most well-known administrator caretaker was Nicolaus Copernicus, a canon of Warmian Cathedral Chapter in Frombork, who resided here between 1516 and 1521. The largest expository room is the refectory with a diamond vault built around 1520. Currently, the castle houses the Museum of the Warmian-Masurian Voivodeship.

== History ==
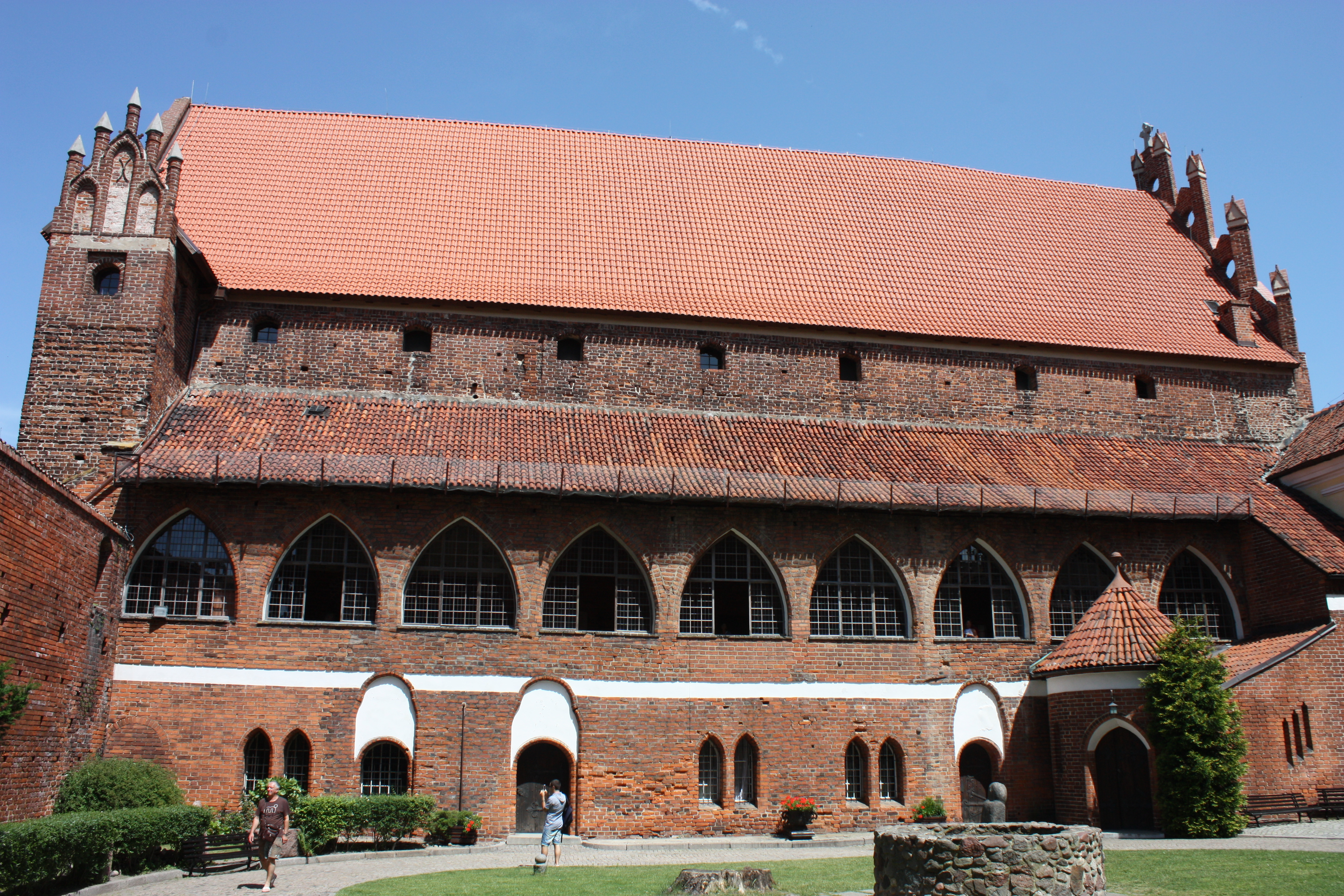
Castle courtyard

The castle was erected by the Warmian Cathedral Chapter as a stronghold against Lithuanians between 1346 and 1353. It is made up of one wing to the north-east of the courtyard and was initially surrounded by a line of fortifications and a ditch which led to the Łyna River with a bascule bridge. The south-east wing of the castle was built in the 15th Century. The 40-meter tower dating back to the 14th Century was placed in the eastern corner of the courtyard and reconstructed in the early 16th Century, giving the castle a circular tower atop a square foundation. During the reconstruction of the tower, the castle's fortifications were raised to 12 meters in height. This made the castle a major bastion located on the borders of Olsztyn, securing its entrance.

The castle belonged to the chapter of Diocese of Warmia, which until 1454 was protected by the Teutonic Order. This made the building and Olsztyn a strategic place during the Polish-Teutonic Wars. In 1410, during the Battle of Grunwald, the castle had surrendered itself to the Polish Army without a battle, however, in 1414 the castle was seized after a siege lasting a few days. During the Thirteen Years' War (1454–66), the castle was being captured multiple times by both powers, and afterwards became part of the autonomous province of Royal Prussia within the Crown of the Kingdom of Poland. The Teutonic Order had endangered the town of Olsztyn once more, and for the last time in 1521. In the years of 1516 to 1521, the administrator of the castle was Nicolaus Copernicus, who organized and led the Polish defense of the castle during a Teutonic siege. During his stay at the castle Copernicus made an inventory of the entire castle archive, wrote an economic treatise, and conducted astronomical observations and mathematical calculations, which became the basis for his heliocentric model of the universe. In the castle there is a preserved astronomical table, made in 1517 by Copernicus. It is the world's only preserved astronomical instrument made and used by Nicolaus Copernicus. In the 16th century, the castle was also used as the seat for two Warmian Bishops, which at the same time were two writers: Johannes Dantiscus (Father of Polish Diplomacy); and Marcin Kromer who wrote numerous hymns in Latin, as well as scientific documents and literature in Polish. In 1580, Bishop Marcin Kromer consecrated the Chapel of Saint Anne at the castle.

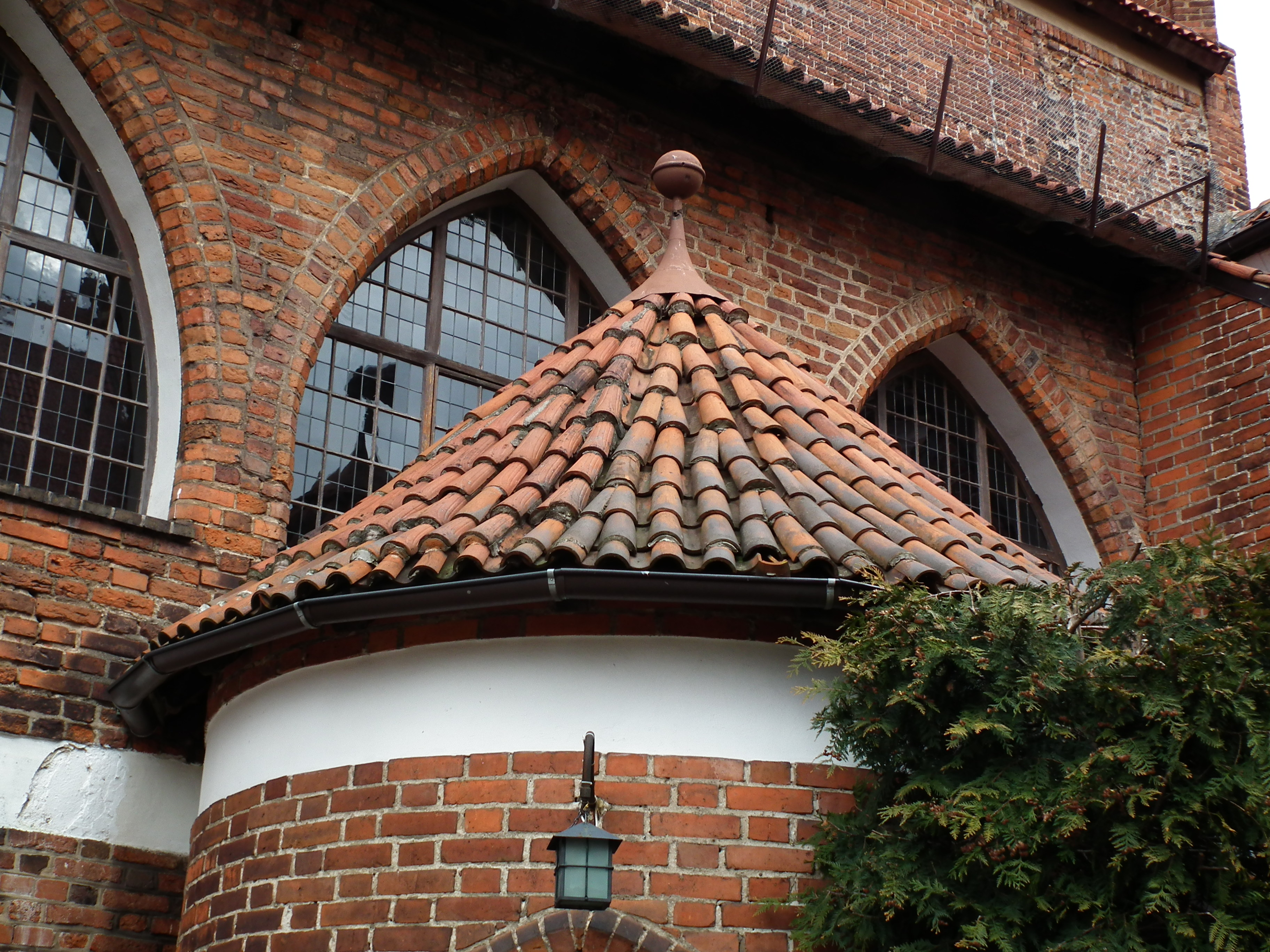
Detail of the structure

Over time, the castle's military importance diminished and its role for the housing of the Bishops of Warmia became less favourable. In 1758, a direct entrance from Olsztyn was built, and a palace wing was built; the expansion meant that many of the fortifications were deconstructed. In 1779, Prince-Bishop and leading 18th-century Polish poet Ignacy Krasicki stayed at the castle. After the First Partition of Poland in 1772, the castle was controlled by the Prussian state.

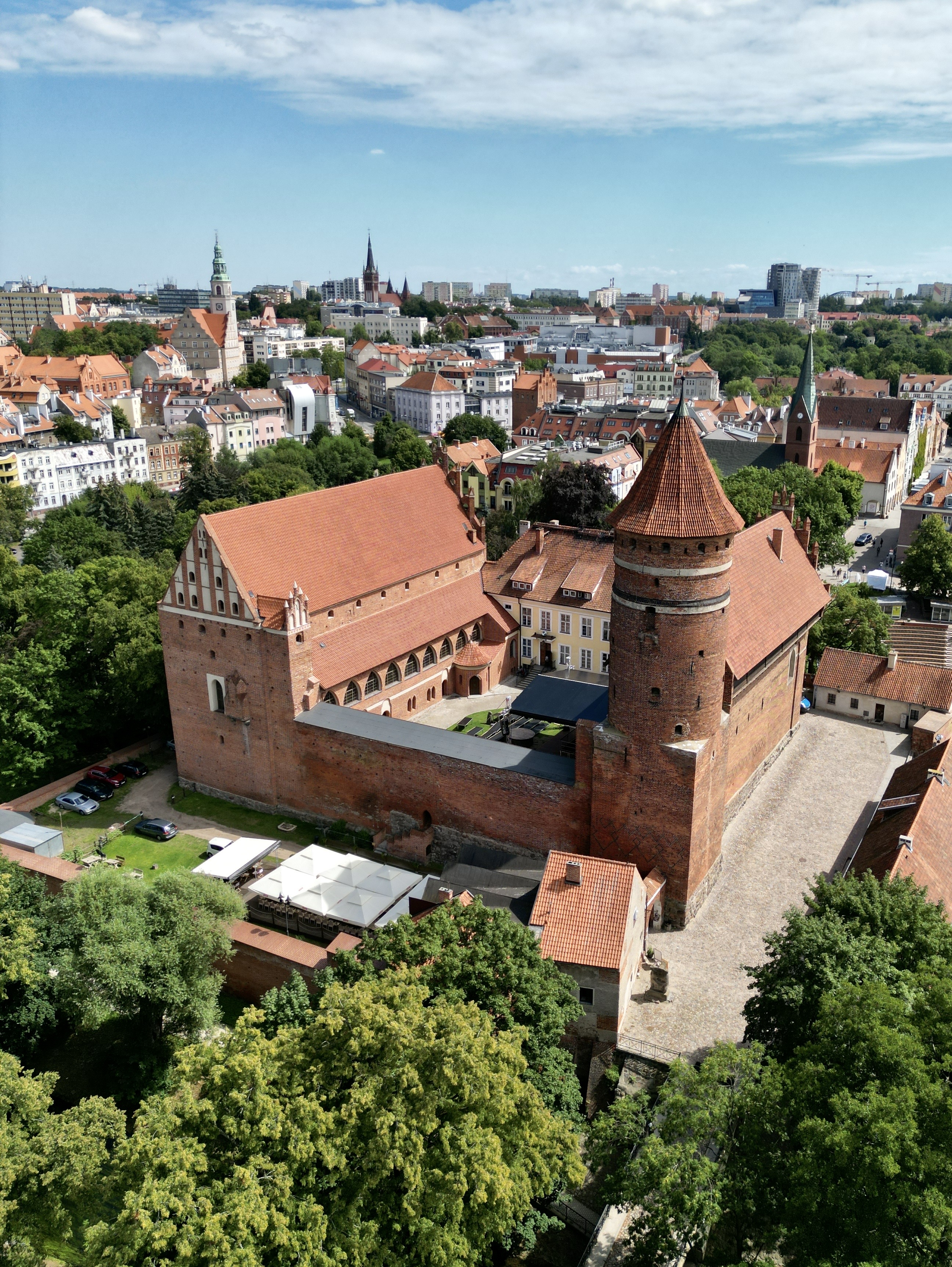
Aerial view

In 1807, the castle was the headquarters of the French command during the Eylau campaign. Napoleon Bonaparte visited the Castle on February 3, 1807, before the battle of Allenstein. In 1845, the bridge connecting the castle to the town was replaced with a levee, the ditch was removed. Between 1901 and 1911, the castle underwent various renovations; this included the change in floor levels, and arched windows in the cloister. The castle became the Museum of the Warmian-Masurian Voivodeship in 1946; apart from various exhibitions the museum also hosts the Olsztyn Artistic Summer (Olsztyńskie Lato Artystyczne).

Olsztyn Castle was depicted on a postage stamp issued by the Poczta Polska in 1971 as part of a series of stamps featuring places associated with Nicolaus Copernicus.

== See also ==
- Castles in Poland
