= Warmian–Masurian Voivodeship =

Province in Poland

Warmian–Masurian Voivodeship Województwo warmińsko-mazurskie
- Voivodeship
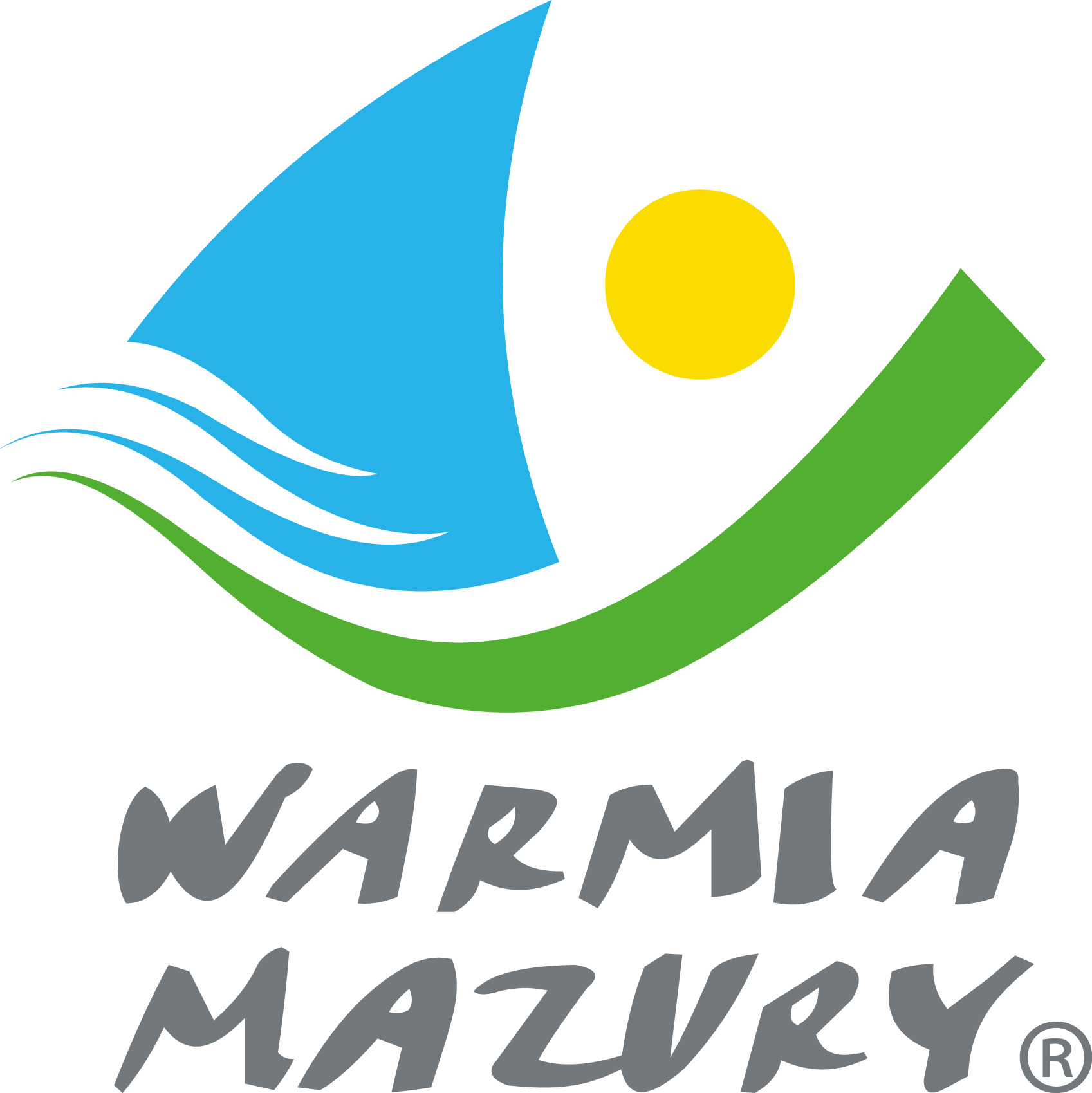
- Flag Coat of arms Brandmark

- Location within Poland

- Division into counties
- Coordinates (Olsztyn): 53°47′N 20°30′E
- Country: Poland
- Capital: Olsztyn
- Counties: 2 cities, 19 land counties *: Elbląg; Olsztyn; Bartoszyce County; Braniewo County; Działdowo County; Elbląg County; Ełk County; Giżycko County; Gołdap County; Iława County; Kętrzyn County; Lidzbark County; Mrągowo County; Nidzica County; Nowe Miasto County; Olecko County; Olsztyn County; Ostróda County; Pisz County; Szczytno County; Węgorzewo County

Government
  - Body: Warmian–Masurian Voivodeship executive board
  - Voivode: Radosław Król (PSL)
  - Marshal: Marcin Kuchciński (PO)
  - EP: Podlaskie and Warmian–Masurian

Area
  - Total: 24,191.8 km^{2} (9,340.5 sq mi)

Population (2019)
  - Total: 1,425,967
  - Density: 58.9442/km^{2} (152.665/sq mi)
  - Urban: 844,177
  - Rural: 581,790

GDP
  - Total: €20.994 billion (2024)
  - Per capita: €16,325 (2024)
- Time zone: UTC+1 (CET)
  - Summer (DST): UTC+2 (CEST)
- ISO 3166 code: PL-28
- Vehicle registration: N
- HDI (2019): 0.848 very high · 16th
- Primary airport: Olsztyn-Mazury Airport
- Website: www.olsztyn.uw.gov.pl
- further divided into 116 gminas; NUTS 2: PL62

Warmian–Masurian Voivodeship (Polish: Województwo warmińsko-mazurskie, pronounced [vɔjɛˈvut͡stfɔ varˈmij̃skɔ maˈzurskʲɛ]) is a voivodeship (province) in northeastern Poland. Its capital and largest city is Olsztyn. The voivodeship has an area of 24,192 km^{2} (9,341 sq mi) and in 2019 had a population of 1,425,967.

Warmian–Masurian Voivodeship was created on 1 January 1999 from the entire Olsztyn Voivodeship, the western half of Suwałki Voivodeship, and part of Elbląg Voivodeship, pursuant to the Polish local government reforms adopted in 1998. The province's name derives from two historic regions, Warmia and Masuria. However, parts of other regions are also located within the province; for example, Chełmno Land, Powiśle, Mazovia, Bartia and Natangia.

The province borders Podlaskie Voivodeship to the east, Masovian Voivodeship to the south, Kuyavian-Pomeranian Voivodeship to the southwest, Pomeranian Voivodeship to the west, the Vistula Lagoon to the northwest, and the Kaliningrad Oblast (an exclave of Russia) to the north.

== History ==
The region was originally inhabited by several pagan Old Prussian clans, including the Bartians, Pogesanians and Warmians, from whom the name Warmia originated. During the Northern Crusade, the Old Prussians were conquered by the Catholic Teutonic Order; their land was granted to the order by the pope, and the region became part of the theocratic State of the Teutonic Order. The Order encouraged colonization by German settlers in Warmia (Ostsiedlung) and Polish colonists from the region of Masovia, called Masurians (Mazurzy), hence the name Masuria. The Old Prussians were heavily decimated during the crusade and the following revolt. What remained of them became Christianized and assimilated into the newcomers and thus became extinct.

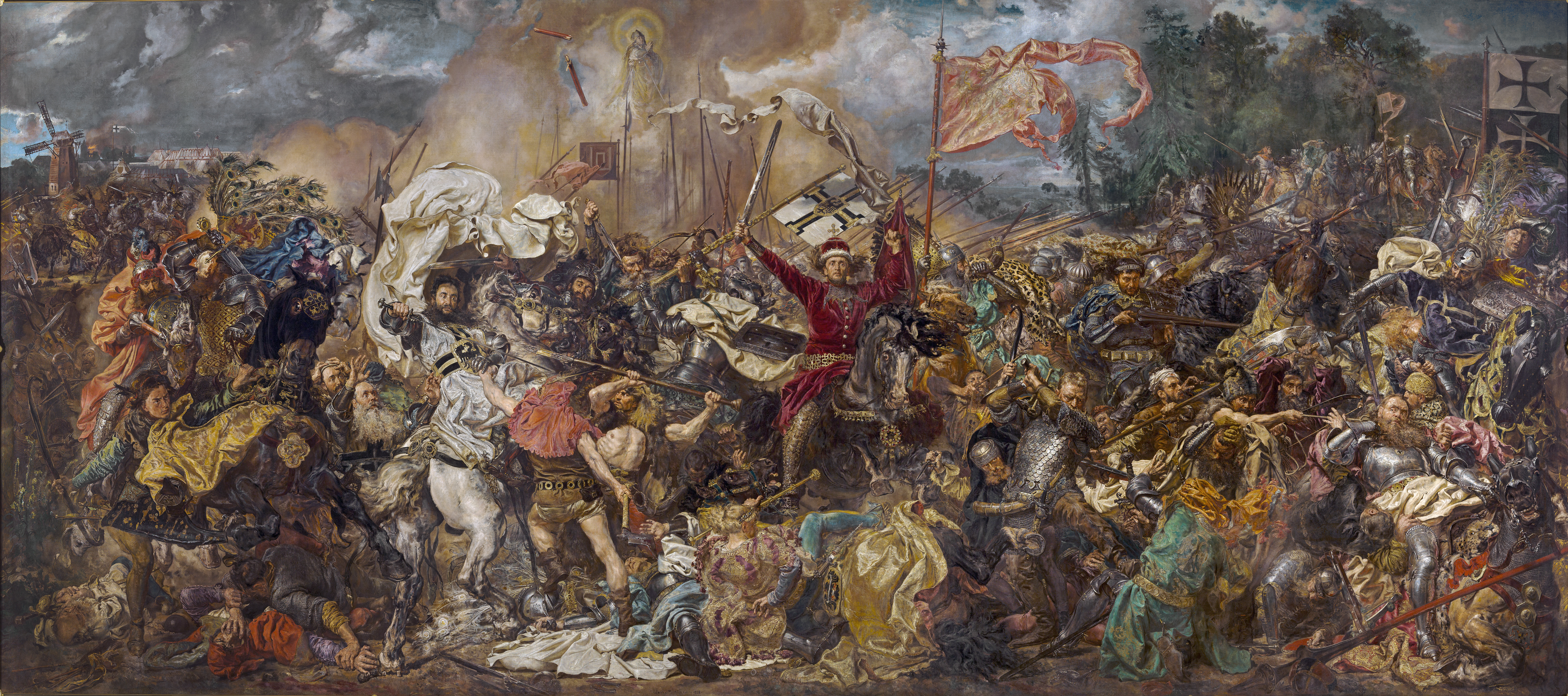
Battle of Grunwald, painting by Jan Matejko (1878)

During the Teutonic rule, the region experienced a process of urbanization and economic boost due to the expansion of the Hanseatic League into the region. The Order later attacked their former ally Poland and conquered the region of Pomerelia, beginning a long-lasting conflict with Poland, which subsequently entered into an alliance with Lithuania. In Masuria, the Poles and Lithuanians defeated the Order at the Battle of Grunwald. The wars eventuated in a rebellion by the urban populations of Pomerelia and Warmia, who were affected by the Teutons' numerous wars; upon the urban populations' request, the region was incorporated into Poland by King Casimir IV Jagiellon, and after the Thirteen Years' War it remained under Polish suzerainty, but was divided into two parts: Elbląg and Warmia were incorporated directly into the Kingdom of Poland, while Masuria became a Polish fief under the control of the Teutonic Order, also considered an integral part of "one and indivisible" Kingdom of Poland.

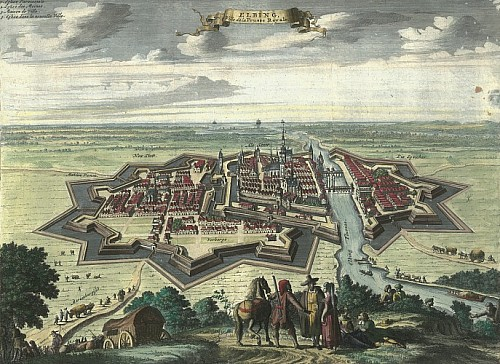
Elbląg was one of the main port cities of the Kingdom of Poland and one of the largest and most influential cities in the entire Polish–Lithuanian Commonwealth.

The state of the Teutonic Order ceased to exist in 1525 when Grandmaster Albert Hohenzollern introduced secularisation, proclaimed the Duchy of Prussia, and became a vassal of Sigismund I of Poland. The Prussian Hohenzollern line became extinct in 1618 with the death of Albert Frederick, and the Duchy was inherited by the Brandenburgian line; Prussia simultaneously entered into a personal union with the electorate of Brandenburg known as Brandenburg-Prussia, remaining under Polish suzerainty until the Treaty of Oliva in 1660. The throne was inherited by Frederick I of Prussia who wanted to unite the Duchy with Brandenburg and also wanted to proclaim himself king of Prussia and therefore participated in the Russian-initiated Partitions of Poland in which Warmia was annexed by the Kingdom of Prussia, and henceforth became part of the newly established province of East Prussia. Together with the rest of the Kingdom, the region became part of the North German Confederation and the German Empire.

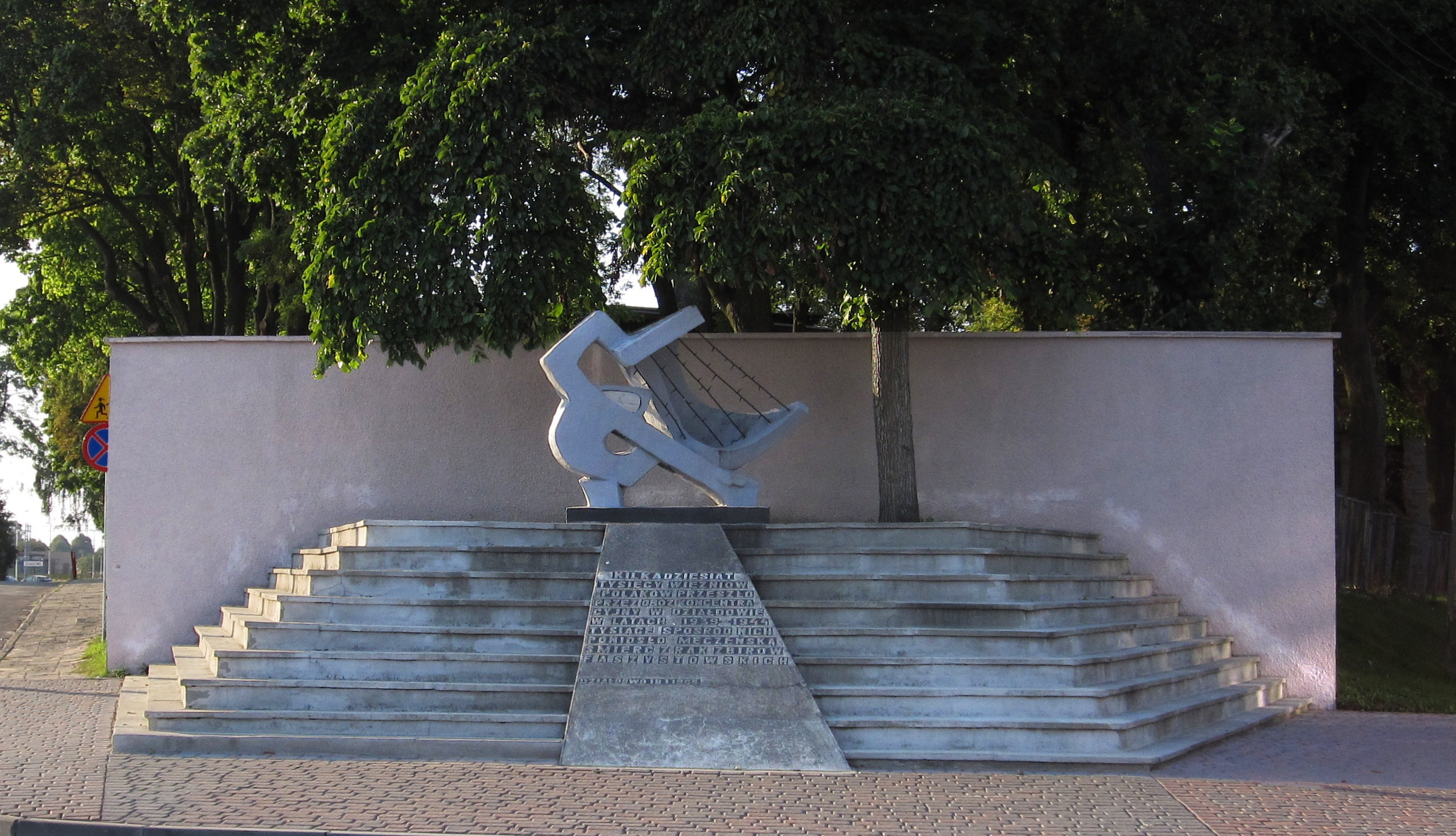
Monument to victims of the German Nazi Soldau concentration camp in Działdowo

In 1914, the province turned into a battlefield, seeing notable battles such as the Battle of Tannenberg as part of the Eastern Front of World War I. Later, the region became part of the Weimar Republic, and Nazi Germany, whereas some areas in the south became again part of Poland, following the restoration of its independence in 1918. In the interbellum, the Polish population was subjected to persecution from both the pre-Nazi and Nazi authorities of Germany. With the German invasion of Poland at the start of World War II in 1939, the Germans eventually carried out mass arrests of local Poles, shut down or seized Polish newspapers and libraries, and occupied the pre-war Polish areas of the present-day province, in which they established the Soldau concentration camp, and carried out massacres of Poles, including at Bratian, Nawra, Malinowo and Komorniki. Several subcamps of the Stutthof concentration camp were located in the region. Stalag I-B, a major German prisoner-of-war camp for Polish, Belgian, French, Italian, Serbian and Soviet POWs, and Wolf's Lair, Adolf Hitler's first Eastern Front military headquarters were located in Masuria. After the end of World War II, the German population was expelled in accordance with the Potsdam Agreement, whereas many Masurians emigrated in the following decades.

=== Ethnic and religious structure ===
In 1824, shortly before its merger with West Prussia, the population of East Prussia was 1,080,000 people. Of that number, according to Karl Andree, Germans were slightly more than half, while 280,000 (~26%) were ethnically Polish and 200,000 (~19%) were ethnically Lithuanian; however, large portions of its German and Lithuanian populations lived in the northern half of the region, outside of the present Warmian–Masurian Voivodeship. As of 1819, there were also some 2,400 Jews, according to Georg Hassel. Similar numbers are given by August von Haxthausen in his 1839 book, with a breakdown by county. But the majority of East Prussian Polish and Lithuanian inhabitants were Lutherans, not Roman Catholics like their ethnic kinsmen across the border in the Russian Empire. Only in Southern Warmia Catholic Poles – so called Warmiaks (not to be confused with predominantly Protestant Masurians) – comprised the majority of the population, numbering 26,067 people (~81%) in county Allenstein (Polish: Olsztyn) in 1837. Another minority in 19th century East Prussia were ethnically Russian Old Believers, also known as Philipponnen; they were primarily located in Eckersdorf (Wojnowo). The Polish population was subjected to Germanisation and Kulturkampf policies.

In 1817, East Prussia had 796,204 Evangelical Christians, 120,123 Roman Catholics, 864 Mennonites and 2,389 Jews.

The Warmian–Masurian Voivodeship has the largest number of ethnic Ukrainians living in Poland due to forced relocations (such as Operation Vistula) carried out by the Soviet and Polish Communist authorities.

Pasłęk in the western part of the voivodeship is considered the first place in present-day Poland where Dutch immigrants settled (in 1297). There is a claim that they were participants in the killing of Floris V, Count of Holland in 1296, who then fled east, which is alluded to by Dutch poet Joost van den Vondel in his work Gijsbrechcie van Aemstel (1637).

== Cities and towns ==
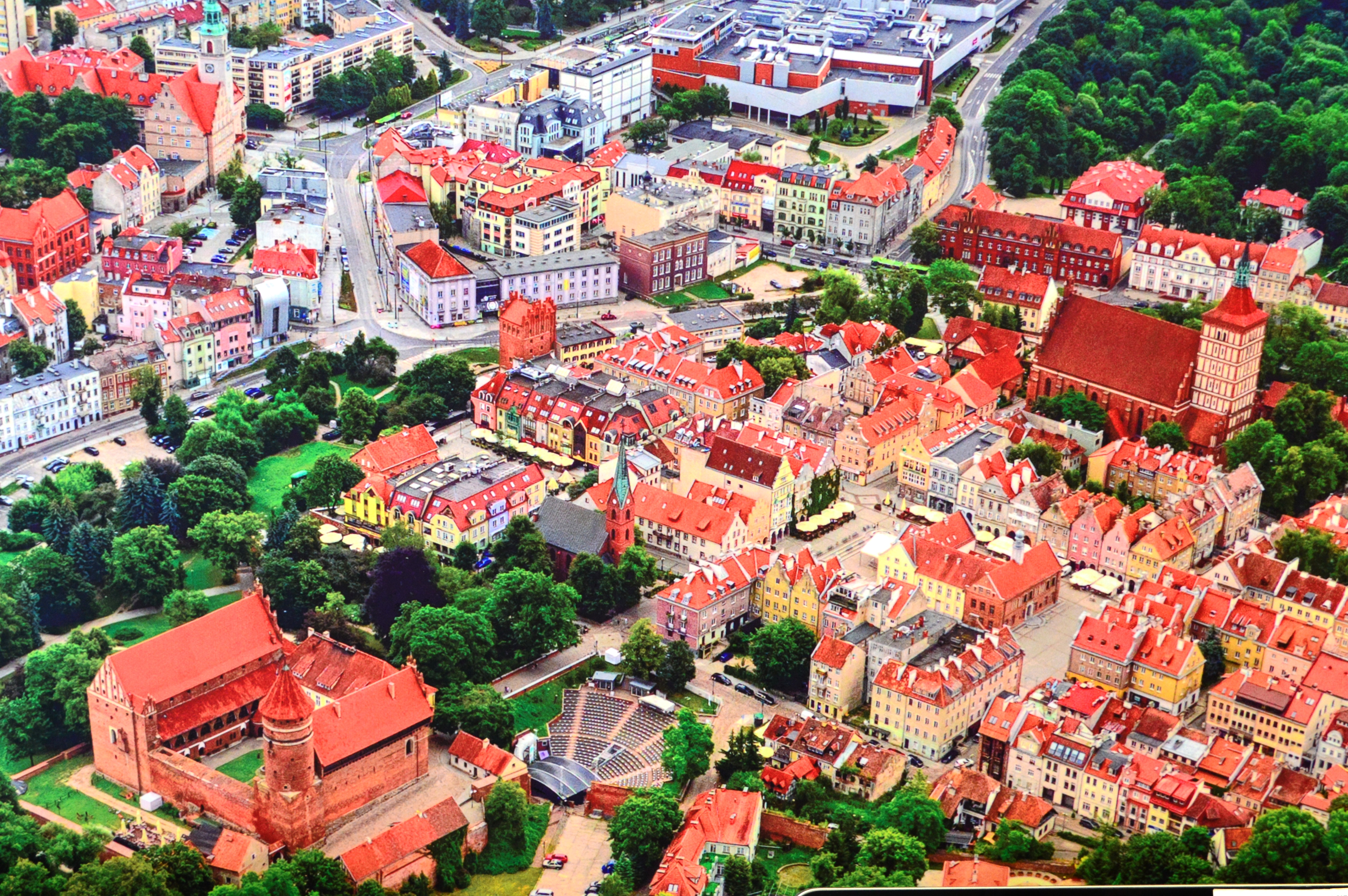
Olsztyn is the capital of the Voivodeship and the largest city of Warmia

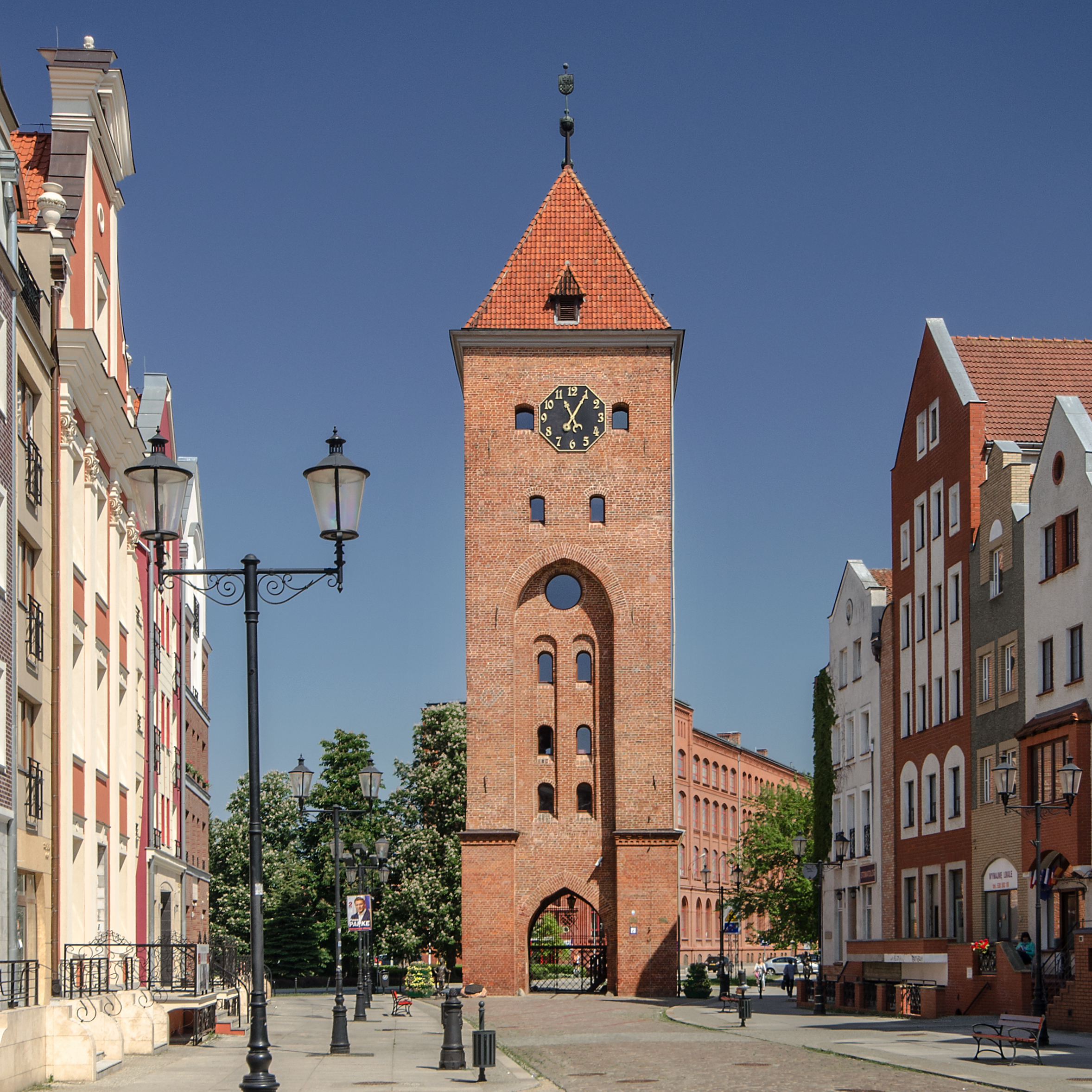
The former royal city of Elbląg is the largest city in the western part of the Voivodeship, and largest city of Powiśle

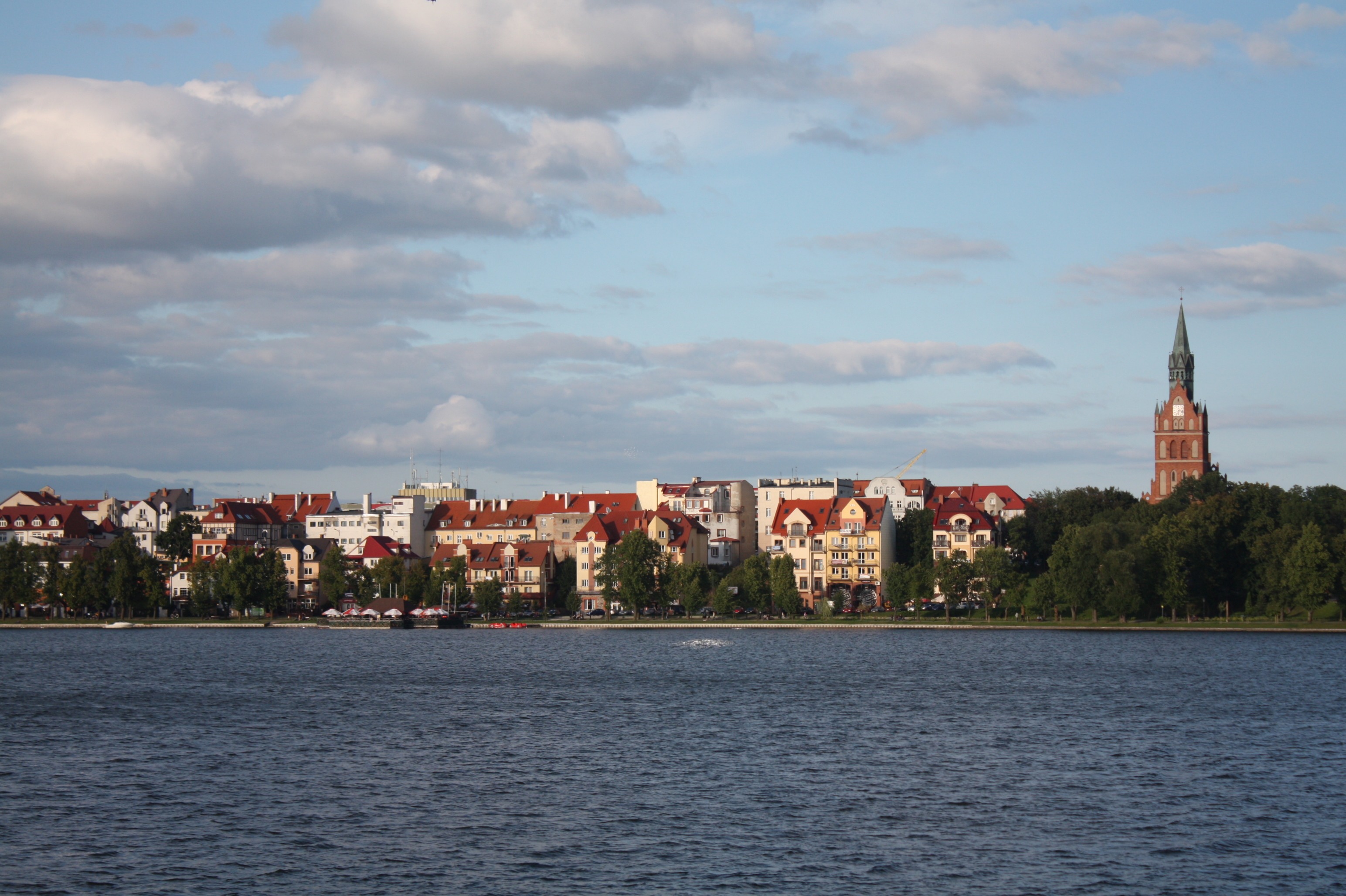
Ełk is the largest city of Masuria

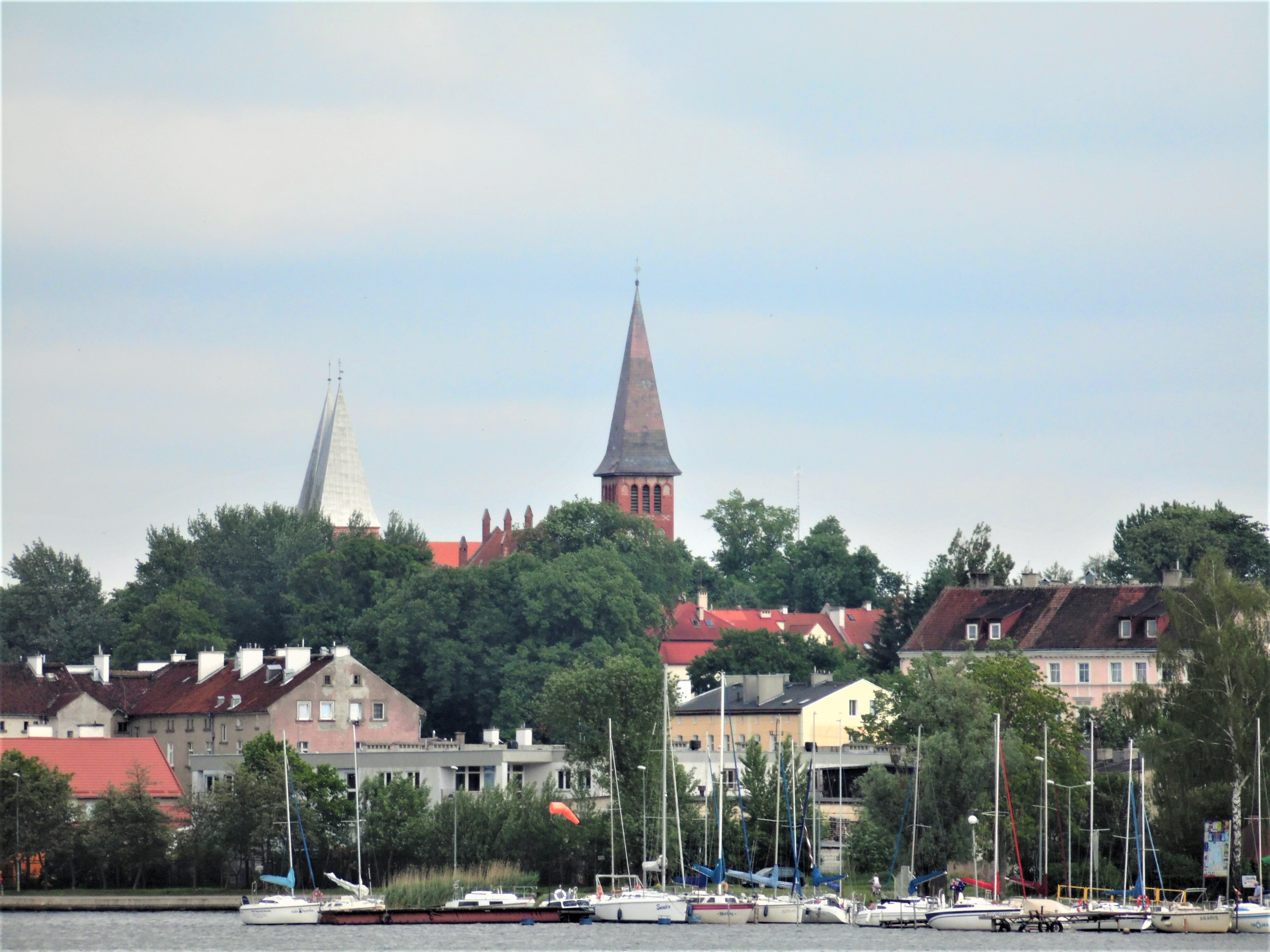
Ostróda is the largest city in the western part of Masuria

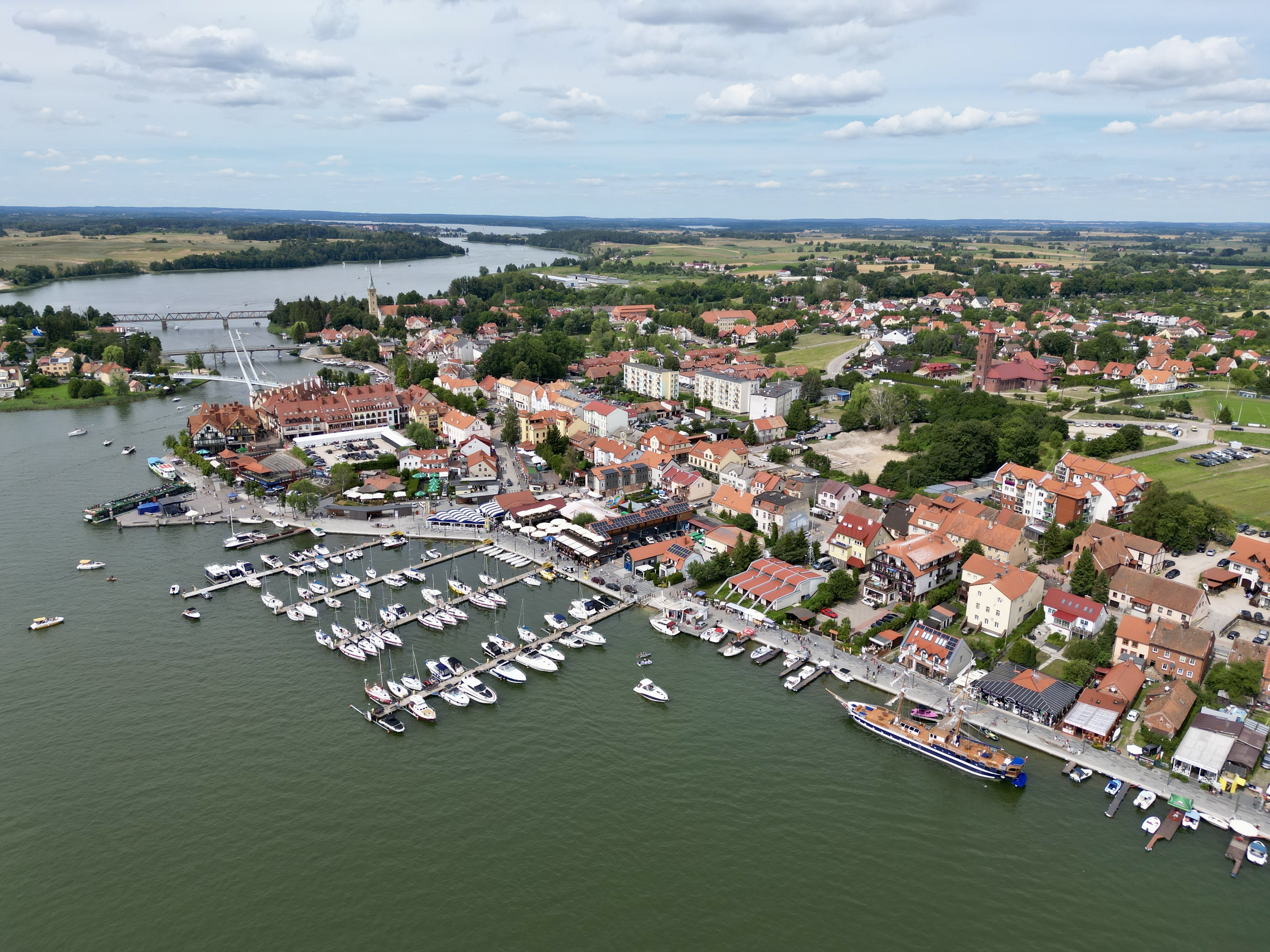
Mikołajki with its well-known marina

Historical population
Year	Pop.	±%
1988	1,397,997	—
2002	1,428,357	+2.2%
2011	1,452,147	+1.7%
2021	1,382,232	−4.8%

The Voivodeship contains three cities and 47 towns. These are listed below in descending order of population (according to official figures for 2019):

Cities (governed by a city mayor or prezydent miasta):
1. Olsztyn (172,194)
2. Elbląg (119,760)
3. Ełk (62,006)

Towns:

1. Iława (33,322)
2. Ostróda (32,947)
3. Giżycko (29,335)
4. Kętrzyn (27,212)
5. Bartoszyce (23,482)
6. Szczytno (23,267)
7. Mrągowo (21,656)
8. Działdowo (21,279)
9. Pisz (19,277)
10. Braniewo (17,040)
11. Olecko (16,442)
12. Lidzbark Warmiński (15,728)
13. Morąg (13,793)
14. Nidzica (13,762)
15. Gołdap (13,716)
16. Pasłęk (12,160)
17. Węgorzewo (11,328)
18. Nowe Miasto Lubawskie (10,891)
19. Biskupiec (10,598)
20. Lubawa (10,387)
21. Dobre Miasto (10,208)
22. Orneta (8,772)
23. Lidzbark (7,794)
24. Olsztynek (7,561)
25. Barczewo (7,513)
26. Susz (5,560)
27. Orzysz (5,546)
28. Reszel (4,532)
29. Ruciane-Nida (4,454)
30. Korsze (4,206)
31. Biała Piska (4,024)
32. Górowo Iławeckie (3,951)
33. Mikołajki (3,826)
34. Jeziorany (3,190)
35. Wielbark (3,035)
36. Ryn (2,851)
37. Pieniężno (2,721)
38. Tolkmicko (2,689)
39. Miłakowo (2,548)
40. Pasym (2,503)
41. Miłomłyn (2,436)
42. Bisztynek (2,370)
43. Frombork (2,332)
44. Zalewo (2,145)
45. Kisielice (2,098)
46. Sępopol (1,958)
47. Młynary (1,772)

== Administrative divisions ==
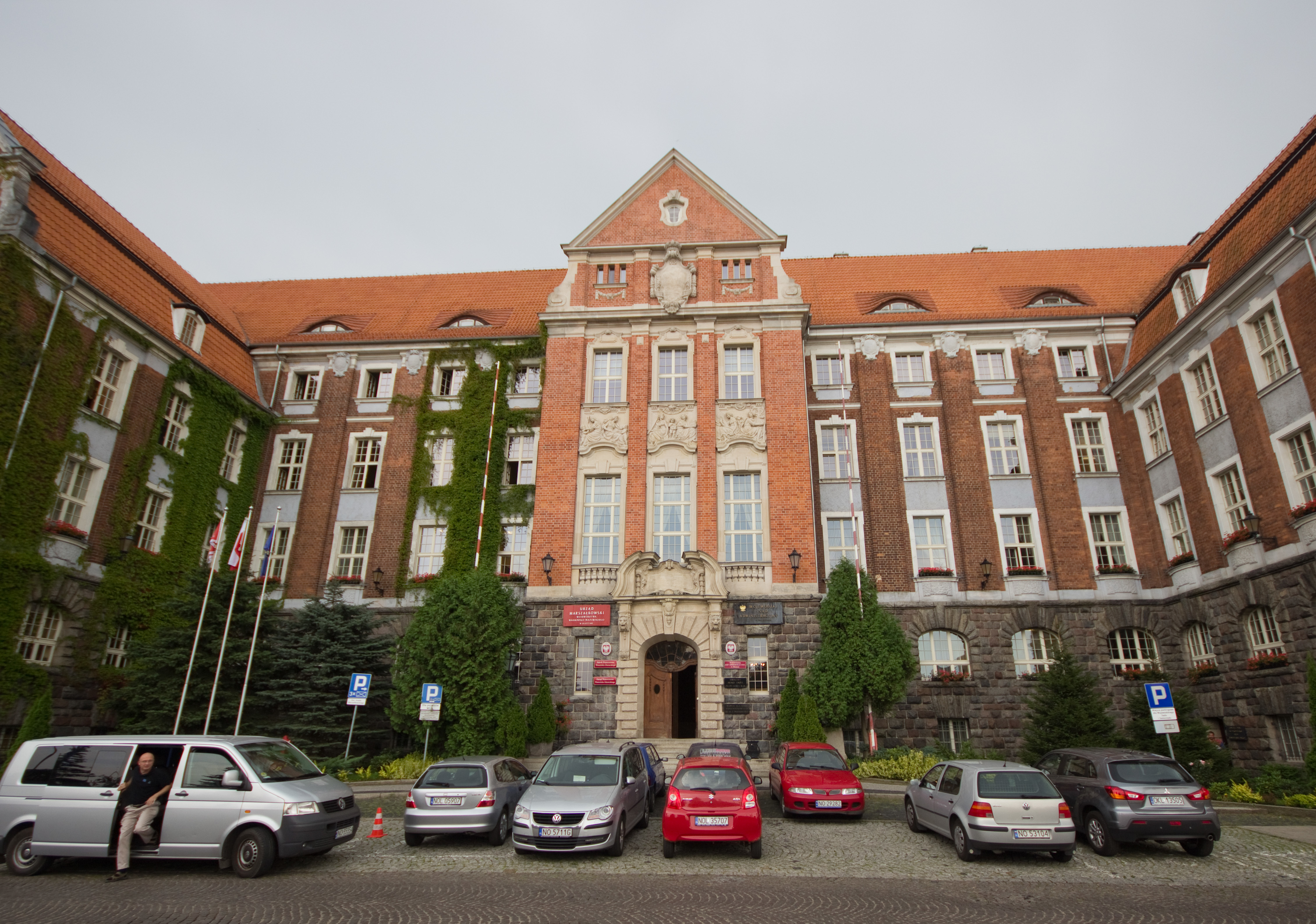
Warmian-Masurian Provincial Assembly building in Olsztyn

Warmian–Masurian Voivodeship is divided into 21 counties (powiaty): two city counties and 19 land counties. These are further divided into 116 gminas.

The counties are listed in the following table (ordering within categories is by decreasing population).

English and Polish names	Area (km^{2})	Population (2019)	Seat	Other towns	Total gminas
City counties
Olsztyn	88	172,194			1
Elbląg	80	119,760			1
Land counties
Olsztyn County powiat olsztyński	2,840	126,334	Olsztyn *	Dobre Miasto, Biskupiec, Olsztynek, Barczewo, Jeziorany	12
Ostróda County powiat ostródzki	1,765	104,526	Ostróda	Morąg, Miłakowo, Miłomłyn	9
Iława County powiat iławski	1,385	92,933	Iława	Lubawa, Susz, Kisielice, Zalewo	7
Ełk County powiat ełcki	1,112	91,446	Ełk		5
Szczytno County powiat szczycieński	1,933	69,678	Szczytno	Pasym, Wielbark	8
Kętrzyn County powiat kętrzyński	1,213	62,536	Kętrzyn	Reszel, Korsze	6
Działdowo County powiat działdowski	953	65,288	Działdowo	Lidzbark	6
Bartoszyce County powiat bartoszycki	1,309	57,642	Bartoszyce	Górowo Iławeckie, Bisztynek, Sępopol	6
Pisz County powiat piski	1,776	56,328	Pisz	Orzysz, Ruciane-Nida, Biała Piska	4
Giżycko County powiat giżycki	1,119	56,661	Giżycko	Ryn	6
Elbląg County powiat elbląski	1,431	57,395	Elbląg *	Pasłęk, Tolkmicko, Młynary	9
Mrągowo County powiat mrągowski	1,065	49,970	Mrągowo	Mikołajki	5
Braniewo County powiat braniewski	1,205	41,223	Braniewo	Pieniężno, Frombork	7
Nowe Miasto County powiat nowomiejski	695	43,900	Nowe Miasto Lubawskie		5
Lidzbark County powiat lidzbarski	924	41,311	Lidzbark Warmiński	Orneta	5
Olecko County powiat olecki	874	34,281	Olecko		4
Nidzica County powiat nidzicki	961	32,940	Nidzica		4
Gołdap County powiat gołdapski	772	26,825	Gołdap		3
Węgorzewo County powiat węgorzewski	693	22,796	Węgorzewo		3
* seat not part of the county

== Sights and tourism ==
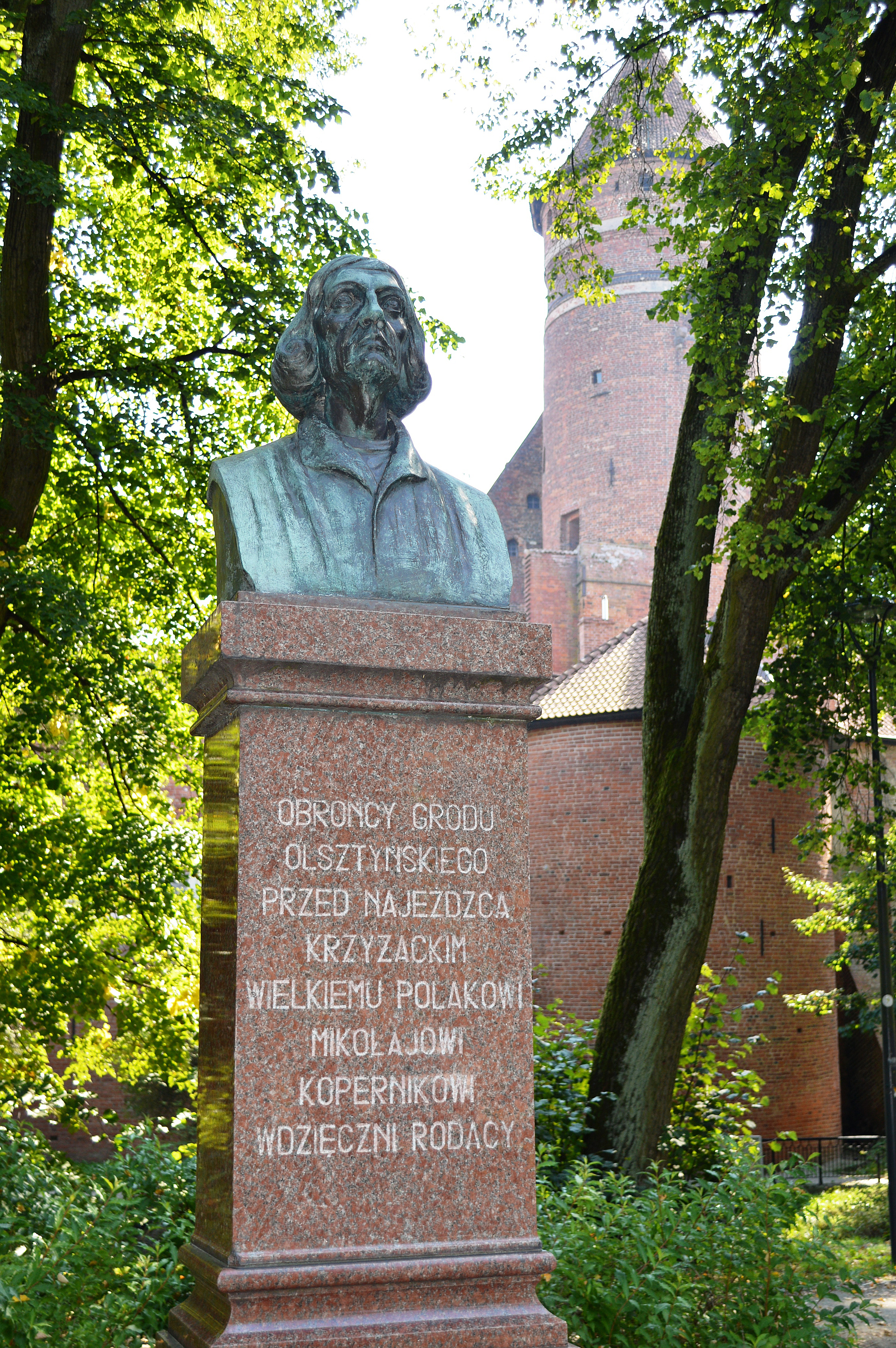
Bust of Nicolaus Copernicus with the Olsztyn Castle in the background

Amongst the most visited sights is the Masurian Lake District, which contains more than 2,000 lakes, including the largest lakes of Poland, Śniardwy and Mamry. Giżycko, Iława, Mrągowo, Mikołajki and Ruciane-Nida are thus popular summer destinations.

Other recognizable landmarks are the Warmian castles (Lidzbark Warmiński Castle, Olsztyn Castle, Reszel Castle, Pieniężno Castle) and the Cathedral Hill in Frombork, where Polish astronomer Nicolaus Copernicus lived and worked, and which contains his tomb. In collections of the Warmia and Mazury Museum in Olsztyn, visitors can find numerous tokens from the time when Nicolaus Copernicus lived in Warmia. The Lidzbark Warmiński Castle was later the residence of Ignacy Krasicki, nicknamed the Prince of Polish Poets, whereas Smolajny hosts a Rococo palace, his former summer residence. There are also multiple other Gothic castles and palaces in various styles in the voivodeship. Święta Lipka in Masuria and Gietrzwałd in Warmia are popular pilgrimage sites, and other notable historic churches include the Gothic collegiate church in Dobre Miasto and churches in Orneta and Kętrzyn, which delight visitors with the uniqueness of their architectonic details, and the Baroque Sanctuary of Saint Mary in Stoczek Klasztorny. Several towns contain entirely or partly preserved medieval town walls with towers and gates, i.e. Lidzbark Warmiński, Nowe Miasto Lubawskie, Pasłęk.

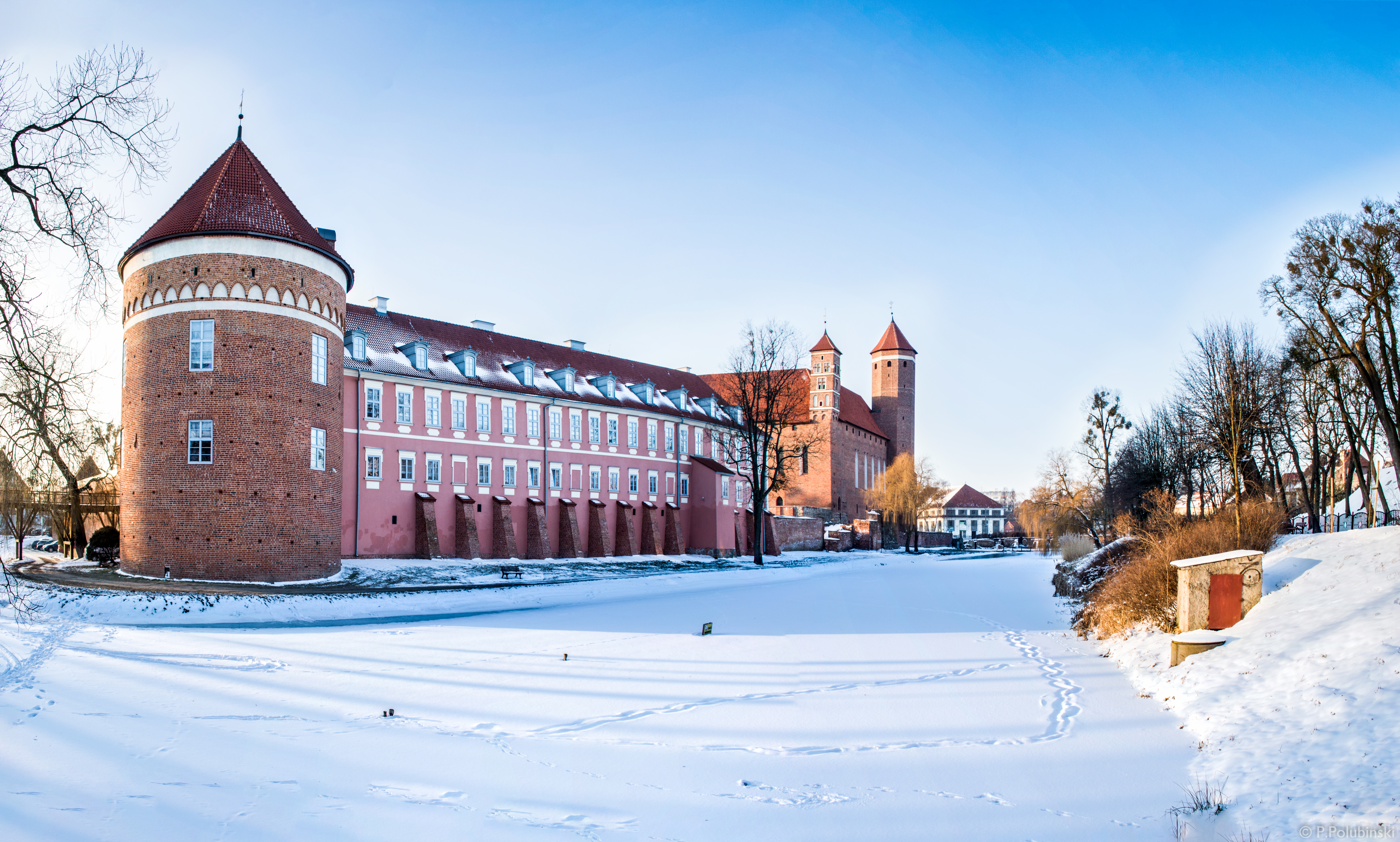
The Lidzbark Warmiński Castle is considered to be a great artistic and historical value

The Elbląg Canal is considered one of the greatest landmarks of the western part of the province. The Grunwald battlefield in Masuria is site of the annual reenactment of one of the largest battles of Medieval Europe. Gołdap is a spa town in the north-eastern part of the province. There is a museum dedicated to composer Feliks Nowowiejski at his birthplace in Barczewo.

There are multiple World War II memorials in the voivodeship, including at the site of the Soldau concentration camp in Działdowo, at the locations of Nazi massacres of Poles, and the war cemeteries in Sudwa and Bogusze, where victims of German prisoner-of-war camps were buried. The Wolf's Lair, Adolf Hitler's first Eastern Front military headquarters in World War II is located in Gierłoż.

There is a small cemetery of the Commonwealth War Graves Commission in Markajmy at which British and Commonwealth prisoners-of-war of Germany from World War I are buried.

== Protected areas ==
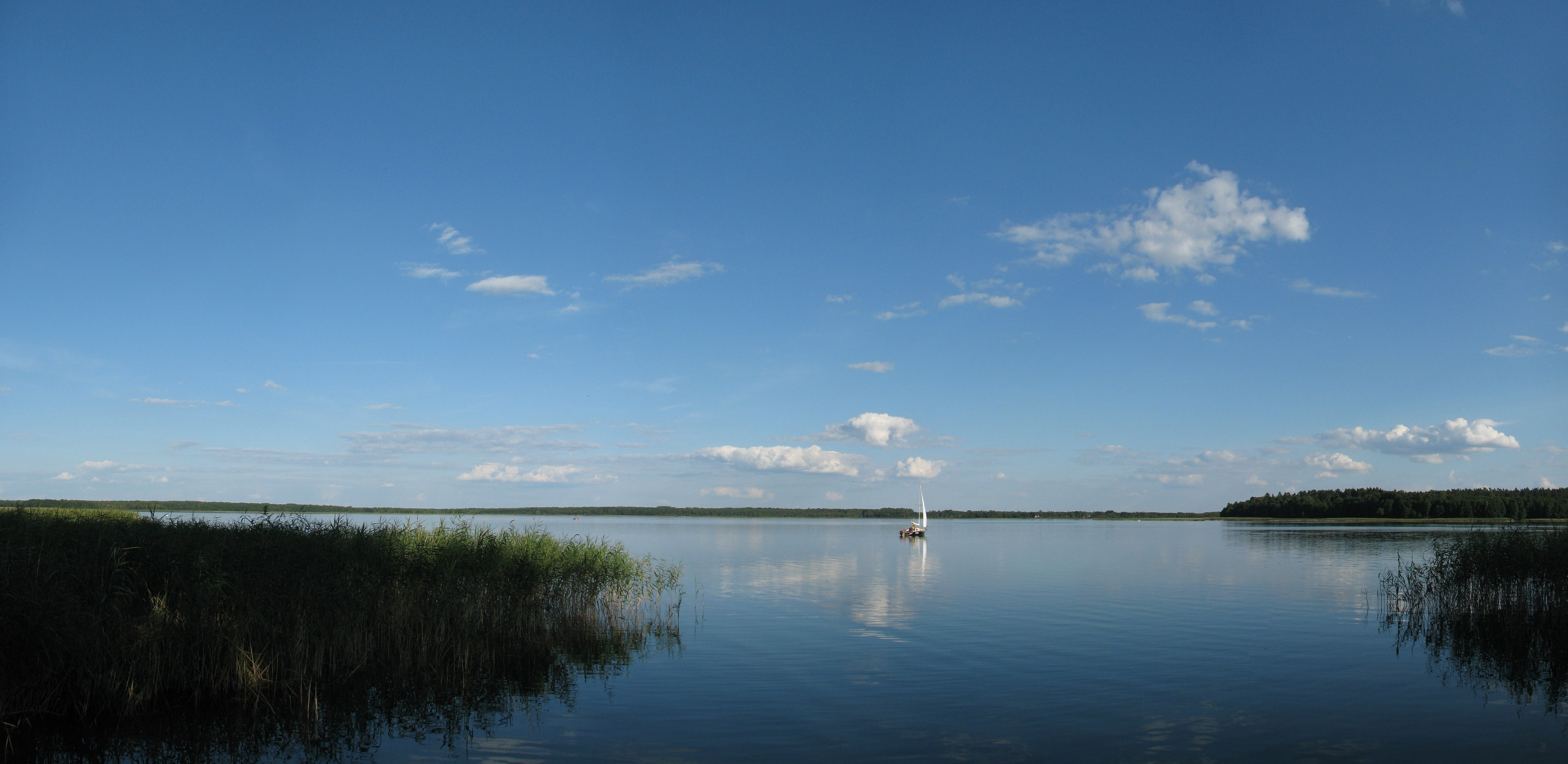
Seksty Lake in the Masurian Landscape Park

Protected areas in Warmian–Masurian Voivodeship include eight areas designated as Landscape Parks, as listed below:

- Brodnica Landscape Park (partly in Kuyavian-Pomeranian Voivodeship)
- Dylewo Hills Landscape Park
- Elbląg Upland Landscape Park
- Górzno-Lidzbark Landscape Park (partly in Kuyavian-Pomeranian and Masovian Voivodeships)
- Iława Lake District Landscape Park (partly in Pomeranian Voivodeship)
- Masurian Landscape Park
- Puszcza Romincka Landscape Park
- Wel Landscape Park

The Łuknajno Lake nature reserve (part of Masurian Landscape Park) is a protected wetland site under the Ramsar convention, as well as being designated by UNESCO as a biosphere reserve.

== Cuisine ==
In addition to traditional nationwide Polish cuisine, Warmian–Masurian Voivodeship has its variety of traditional foods and drinks, specific to its Warmia and Masuria regions, officially protected by the Ministry of Agriculture and Rural Development of Poland. Masuria produces several types of various meat products, especially kiełbasa, and a plethora of traditional Polish honey. Masuria also shares with neighboring Podlaskie Voivodeship the tradition of producing sękacz, a traditional spit cake of northeastern Poland.

The protected traditional alcoholic beverages of the province are Okowita miodowa warmińska, a beverage of 42% alcohol by volume made from Warmian honey, the Warmian porter, a local type of Polish beer, and Masurian nalewka niedźwiedziówka.

== Education ==
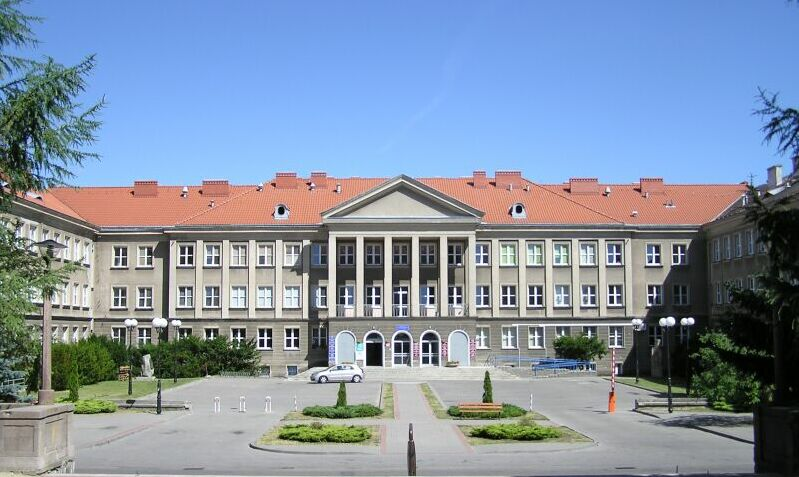
University of Warmia and Mazury in Olsztyn

The chief institutions of higher learning in the voivodeship are the University of Warmia and Mazury in Olsztyn and Higher State College of Vocational Education in Elbląg. Kortowiada, one of the largest annual university students' holidays in Poland, is held in Olsztyn.

The Police Academy in Szczytno, the main police academy in Poland, is located in the voivodeship.

== International relations ==
28 towns are members of the international membership organization Cittaslow, more than in any other province of Poland.

=== Twin towns – sister cities ===
The Warmian–Masurian Voivodeship is twinned with:

- Podolsk, Russia

== Sports ==
Professional sports teams
Club	Sport	League	Trophies
AZS Olsztyn	Volleyball (men's)	PlusLiga	5 Polish Championships; 7 Polish Cups
Start Elbląg	Handball (women's)	Superliga	2 Polish Championships (1992, 1994); 3 Polish Cups (1993, 1994, 1999)
Olimpia Elbląg	Football (men's)	III liga	0
Stomil Olsztyn	Football (men's)	IV liga	0
Stomilanki Olsztyn	Football (women's)	Ekstraliga	0
Constract Lubawa	Futsal (men's)	Ekstraklasa	1 Polish Cup (2020)

Stare Jabłonki hosted the 2013 Beach Volleyball World Championships and 2019 European Beach Handball Championship.

== Gallery ==
Popular attractions and tourist destinations

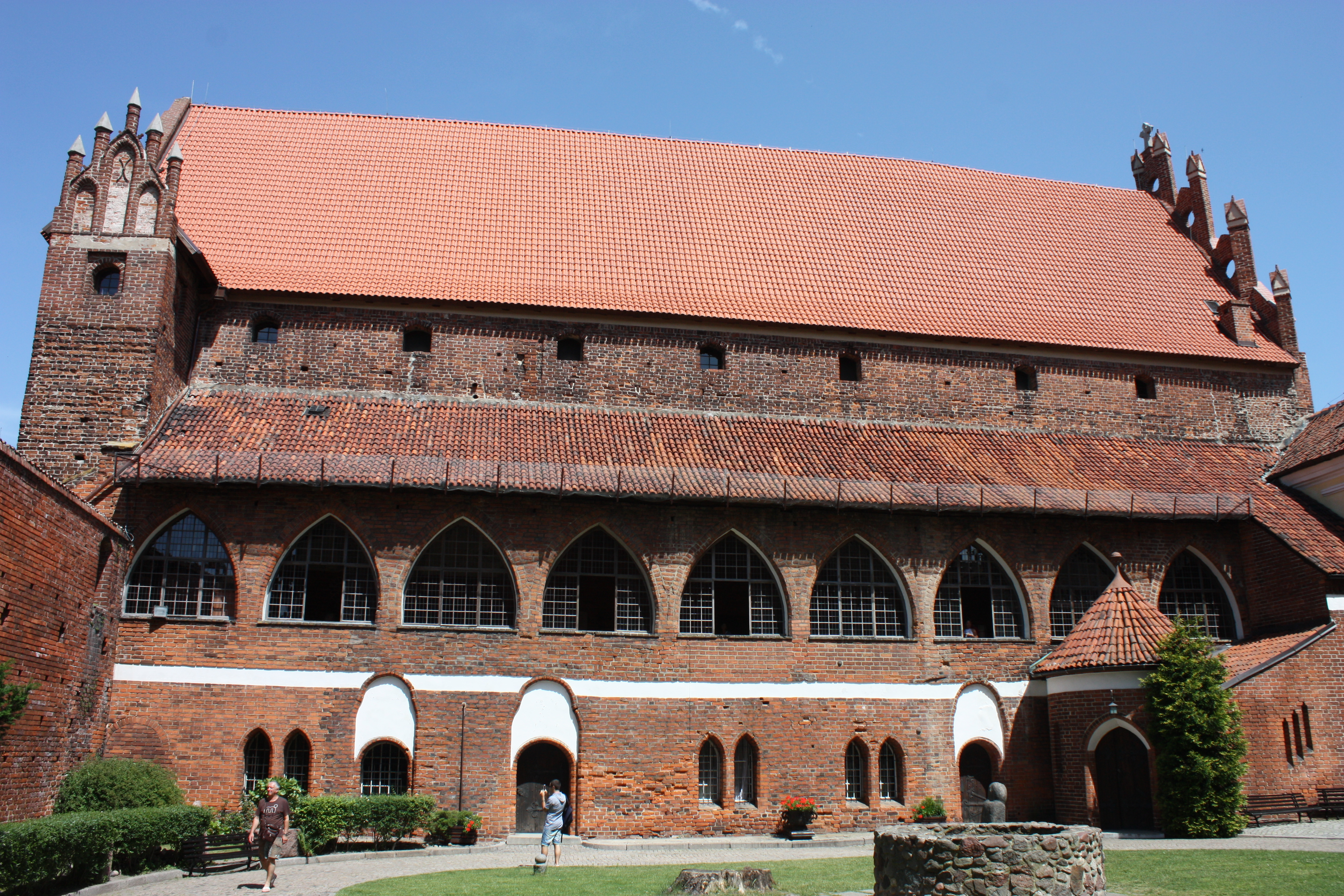
Olsztyn Castle

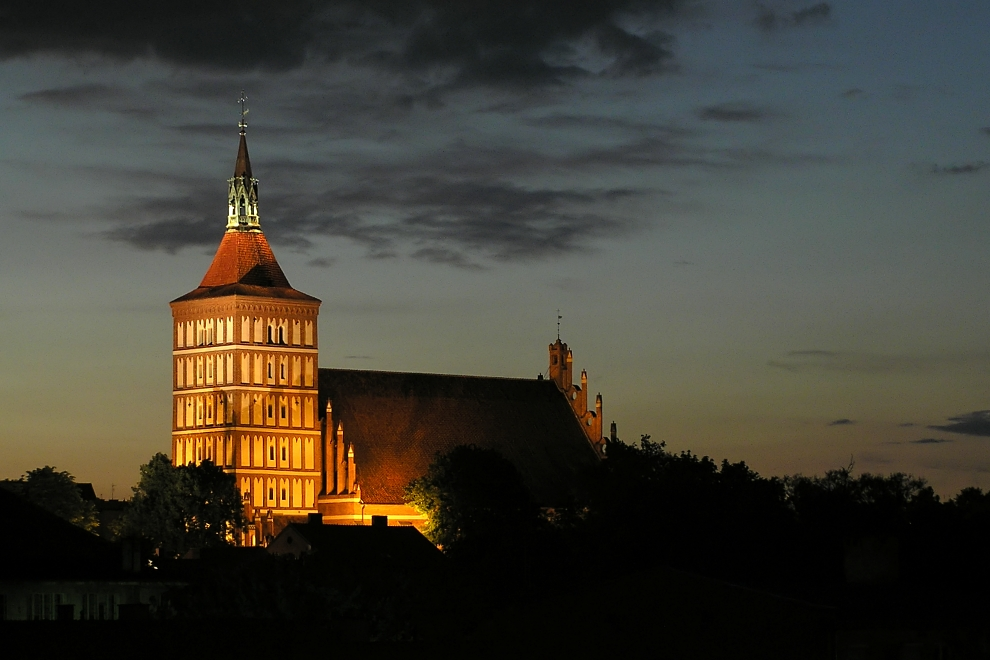
St. James' Cathedral in Olsztyn

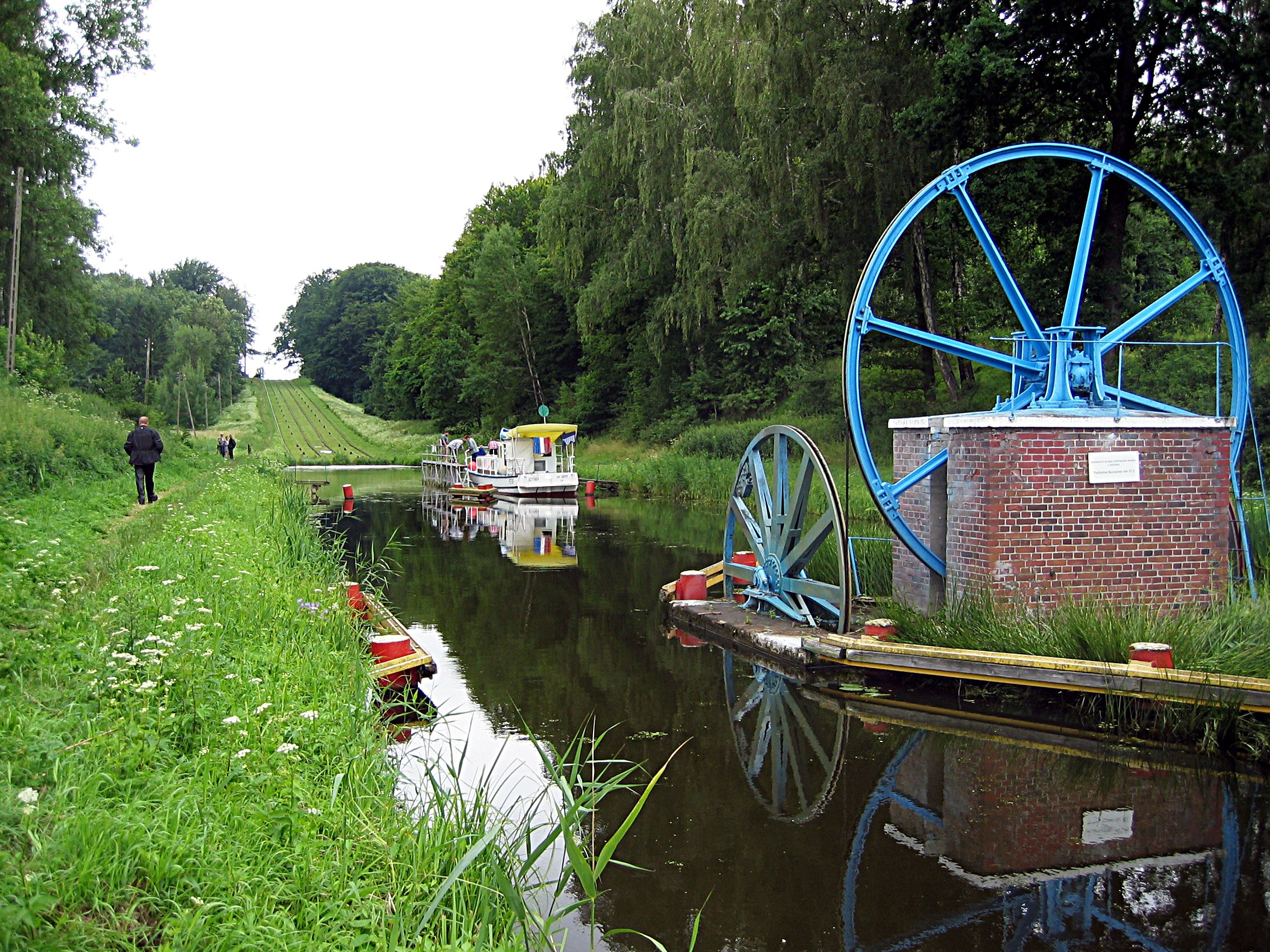
Elbląg Canal

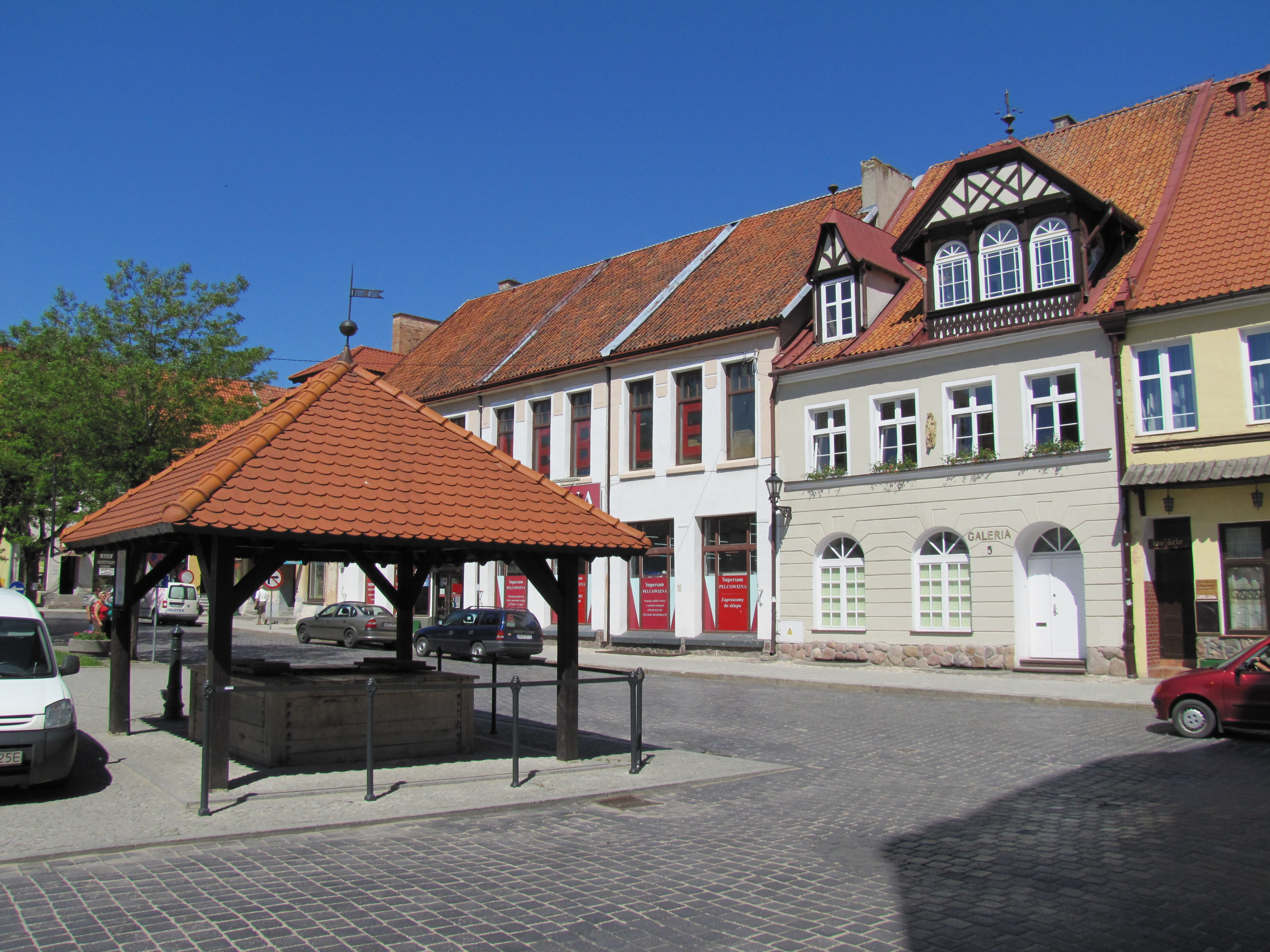
Reszel historic town center

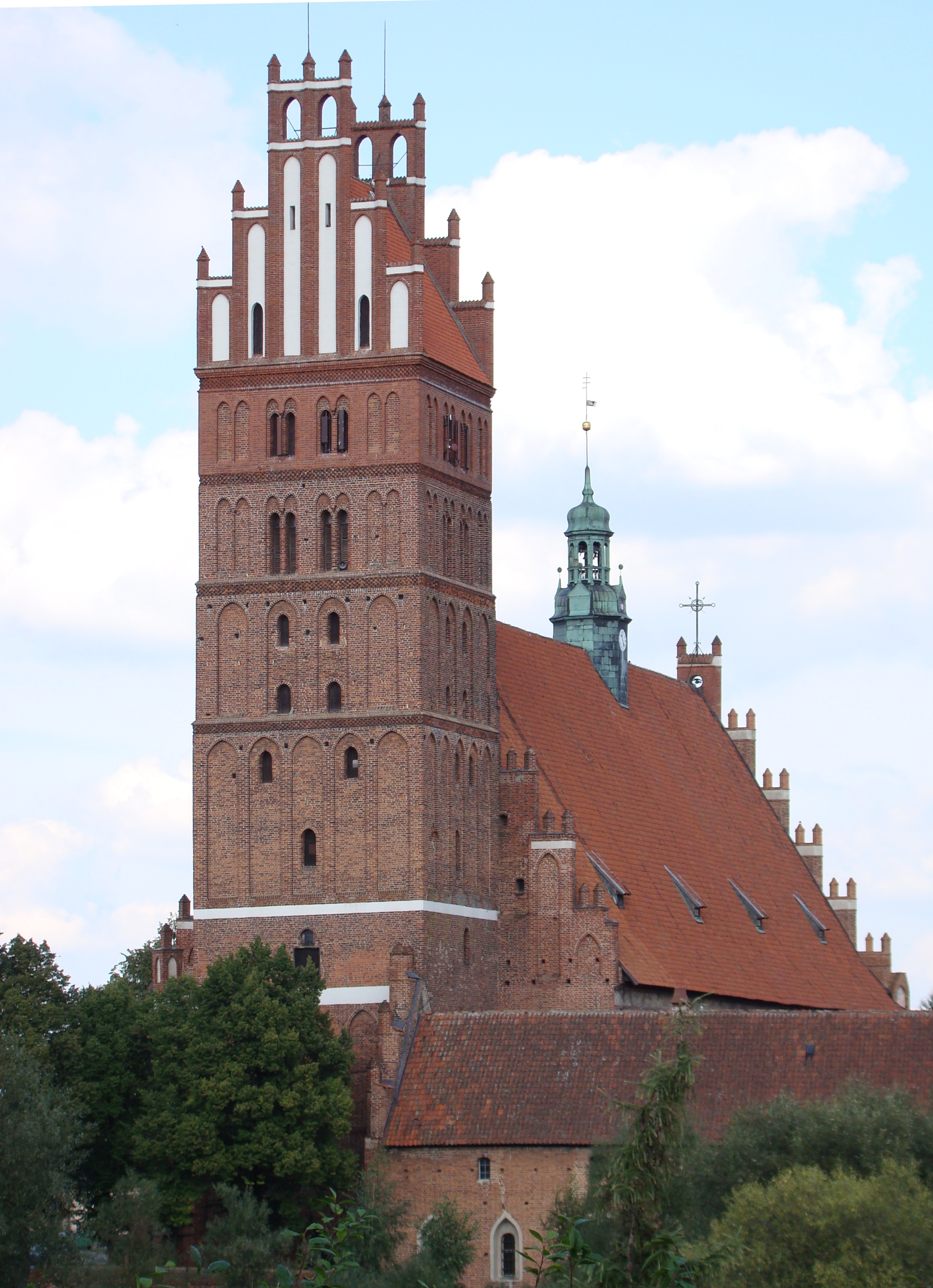
Collegiate church in Dobre Miasto

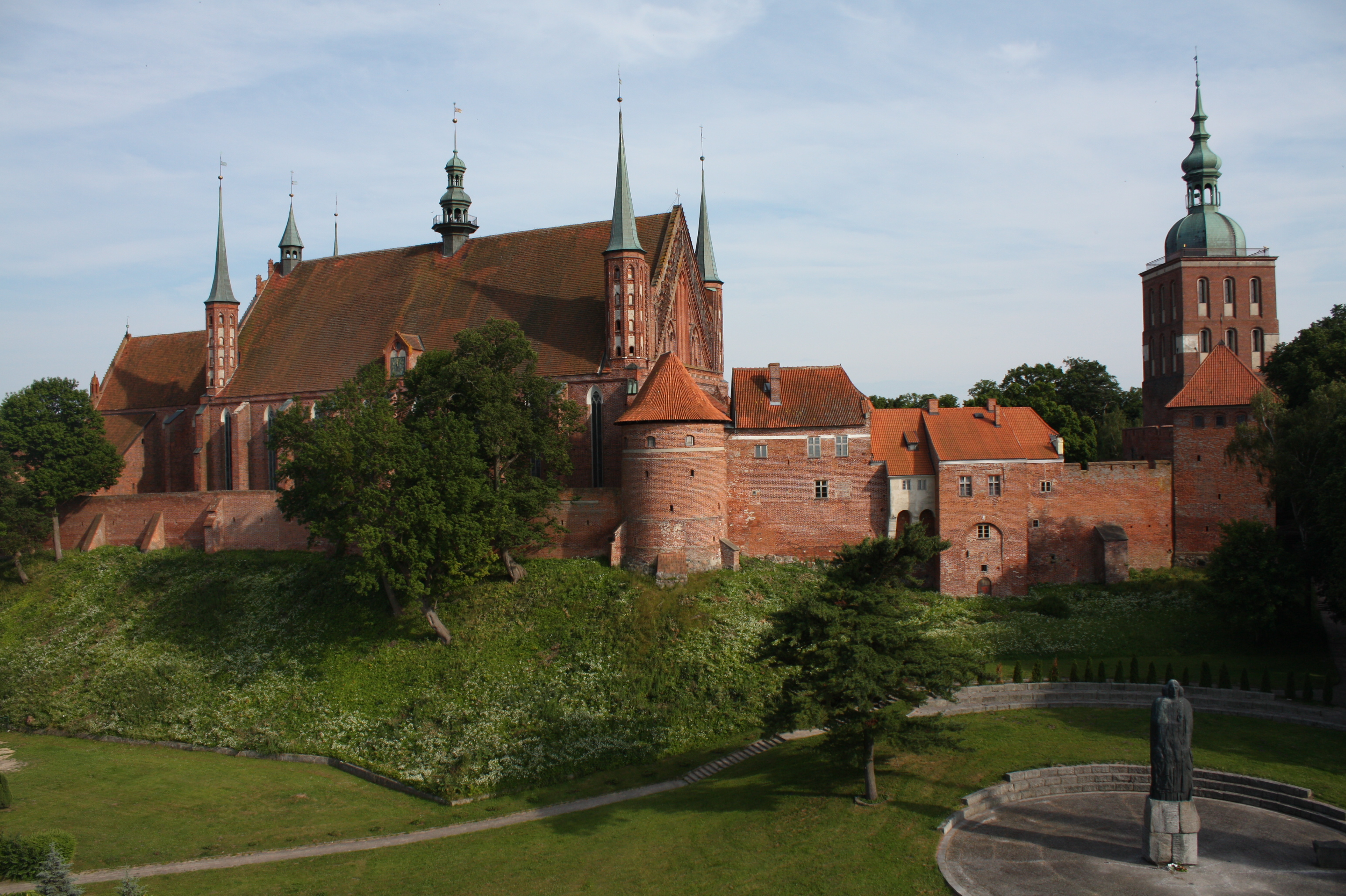
Brick Gothic fortified cathedral in Frombork, burial place of astronomer Nicolaus Copernicus

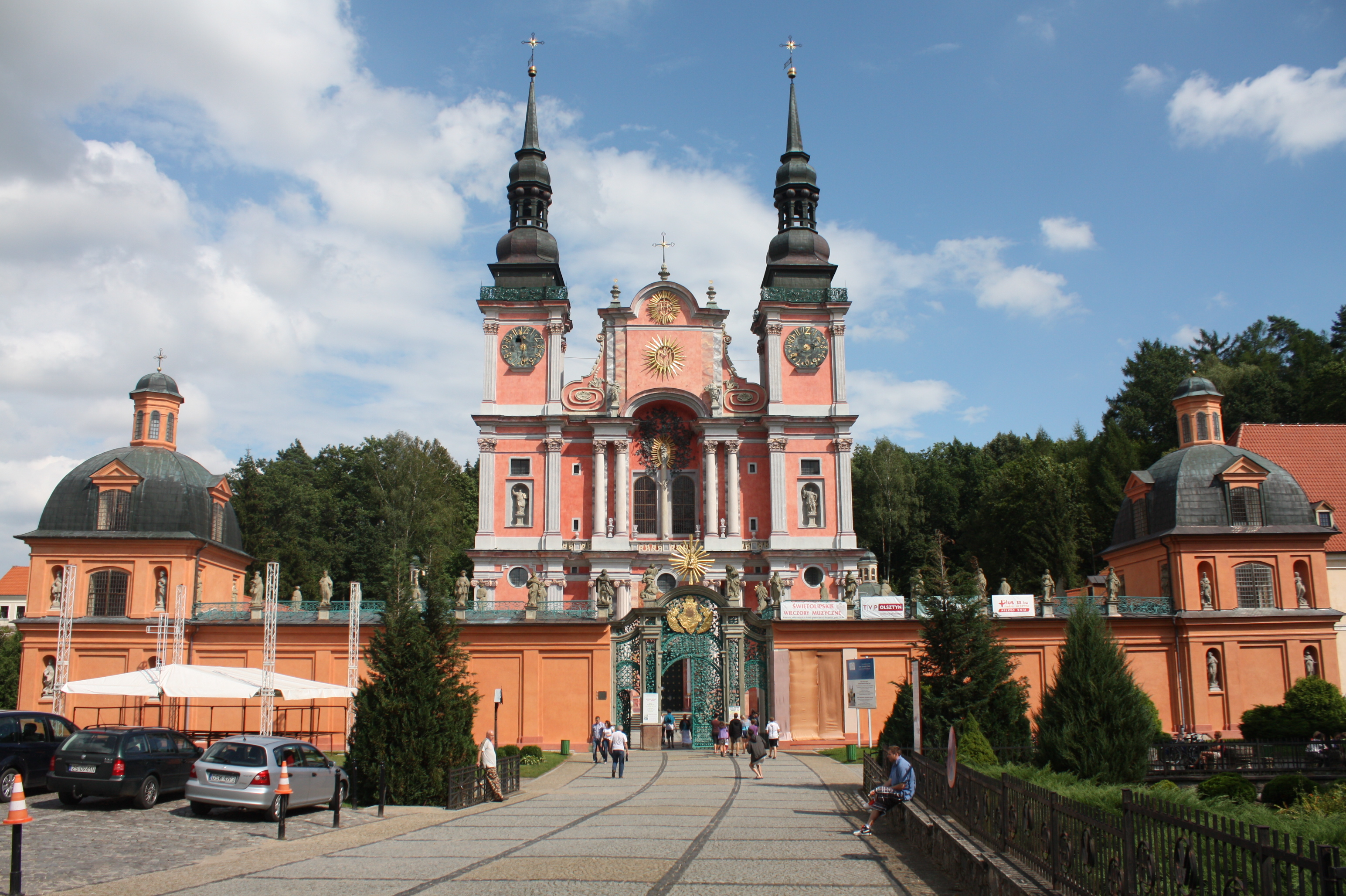
Sanctuary of Saint Mary in Święta Lipka

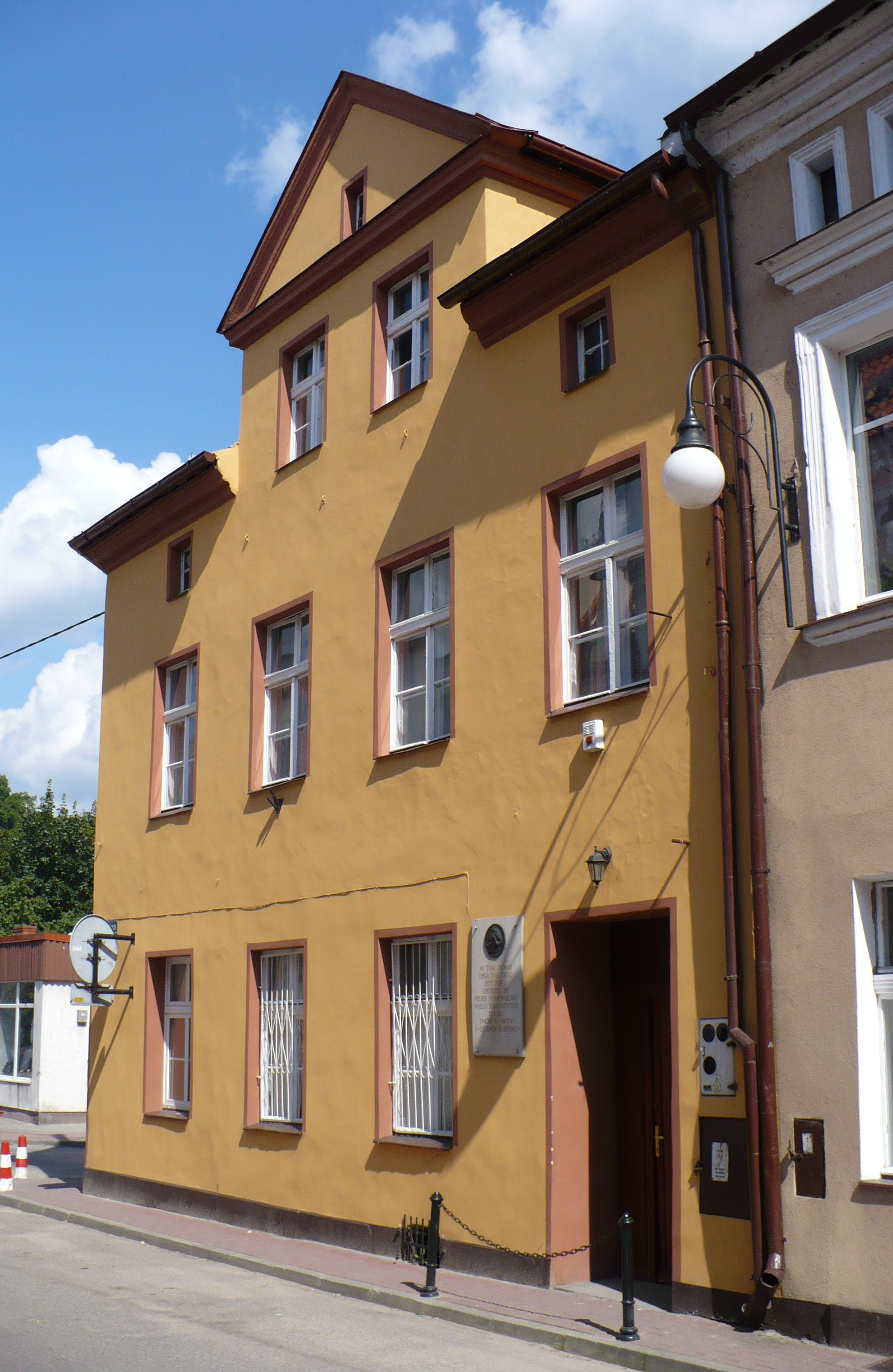
Birthplace of composer Feliks Nowowiejski in Barczewo

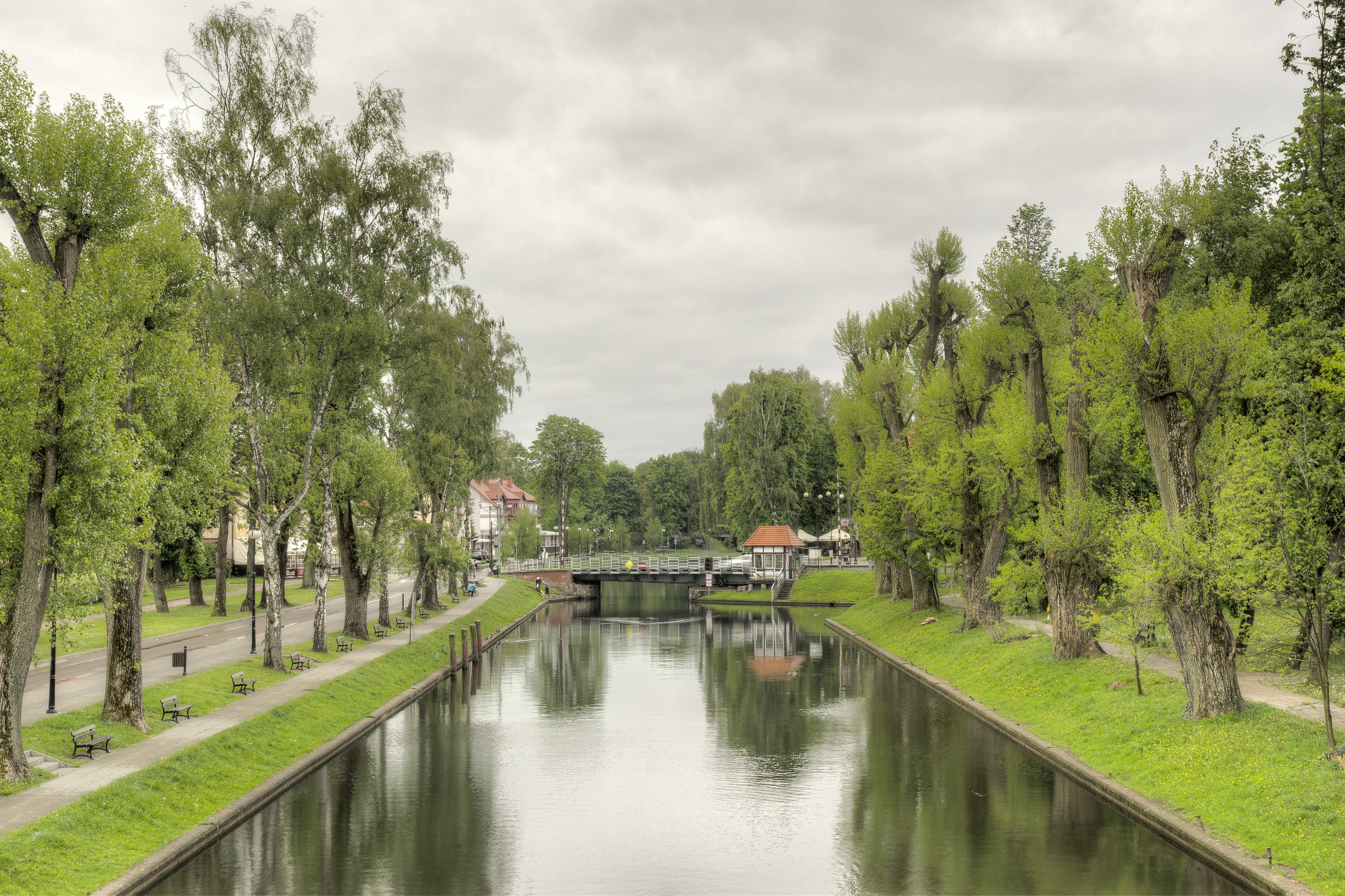
Łuczański Canal and the swing bridge in Giżycko

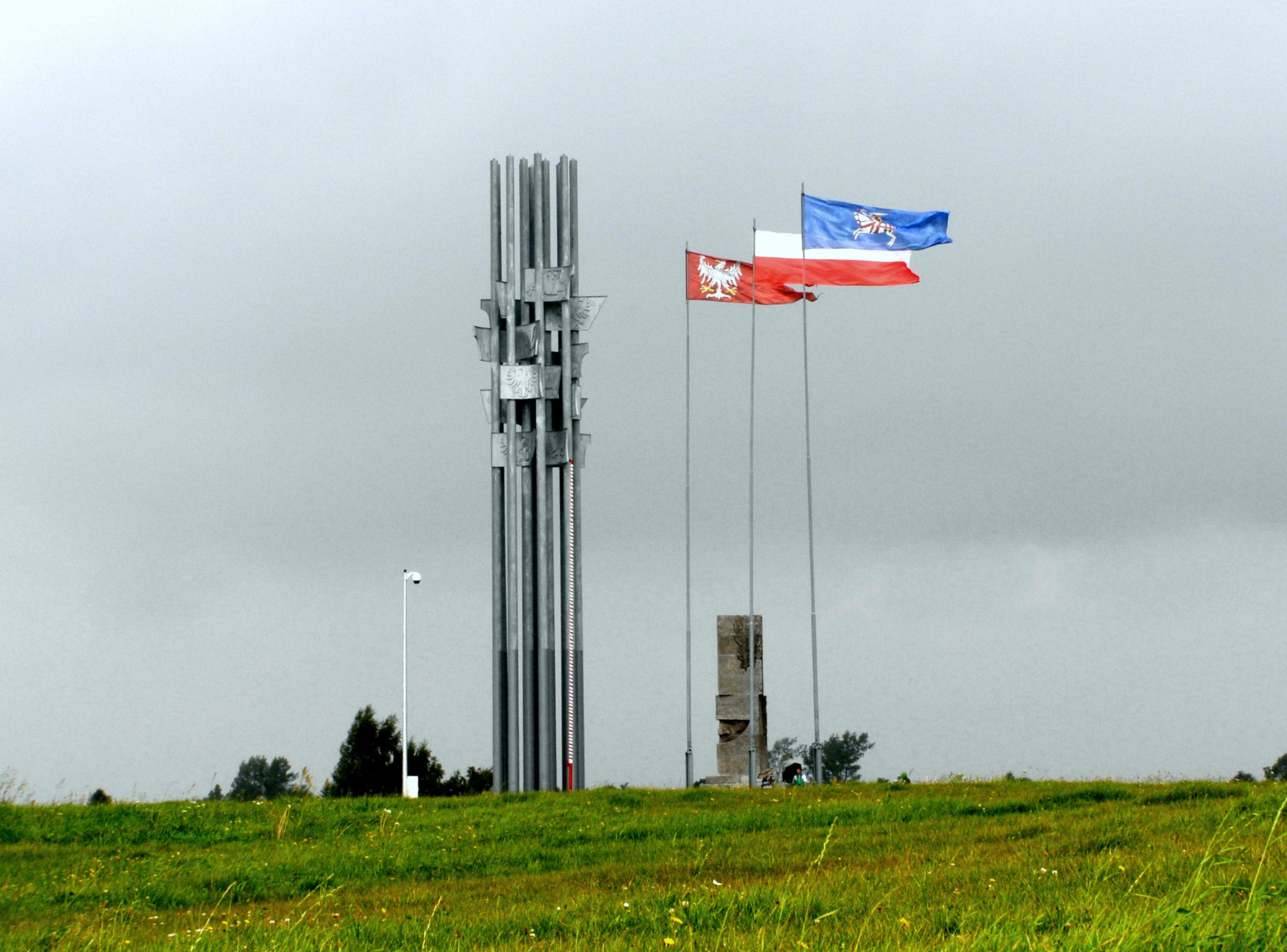
Grunwald battlefield

== See also ==
- Masurian dialects
- Nidka river

== Sources ==
- Plater, Stanisław (1825). Jeografia wschodniéy części Europy czyli Opis krajów przez wielorakie narody słowiańskie zamieszkanych : obejmujący Prussy, Xsięztwo Poznańskie, Szląsk Pruski, Gallicyą, Rzeczpospolitę Krakowską, Krolestwo Polskie i Litwę [Geography of the Eastern Part of Europe, or Description of the Countries inhabited by Various Slavic Nations: Including Prussia, the Duchy of Posen, Prussian Silesia, Galicia, the Republic of Cracow, the Kingdom of Poland, and Lithuania] (in Polish). Wrocław: Wilhelm Bogumił Korn.
