= Orzysz (lake) =

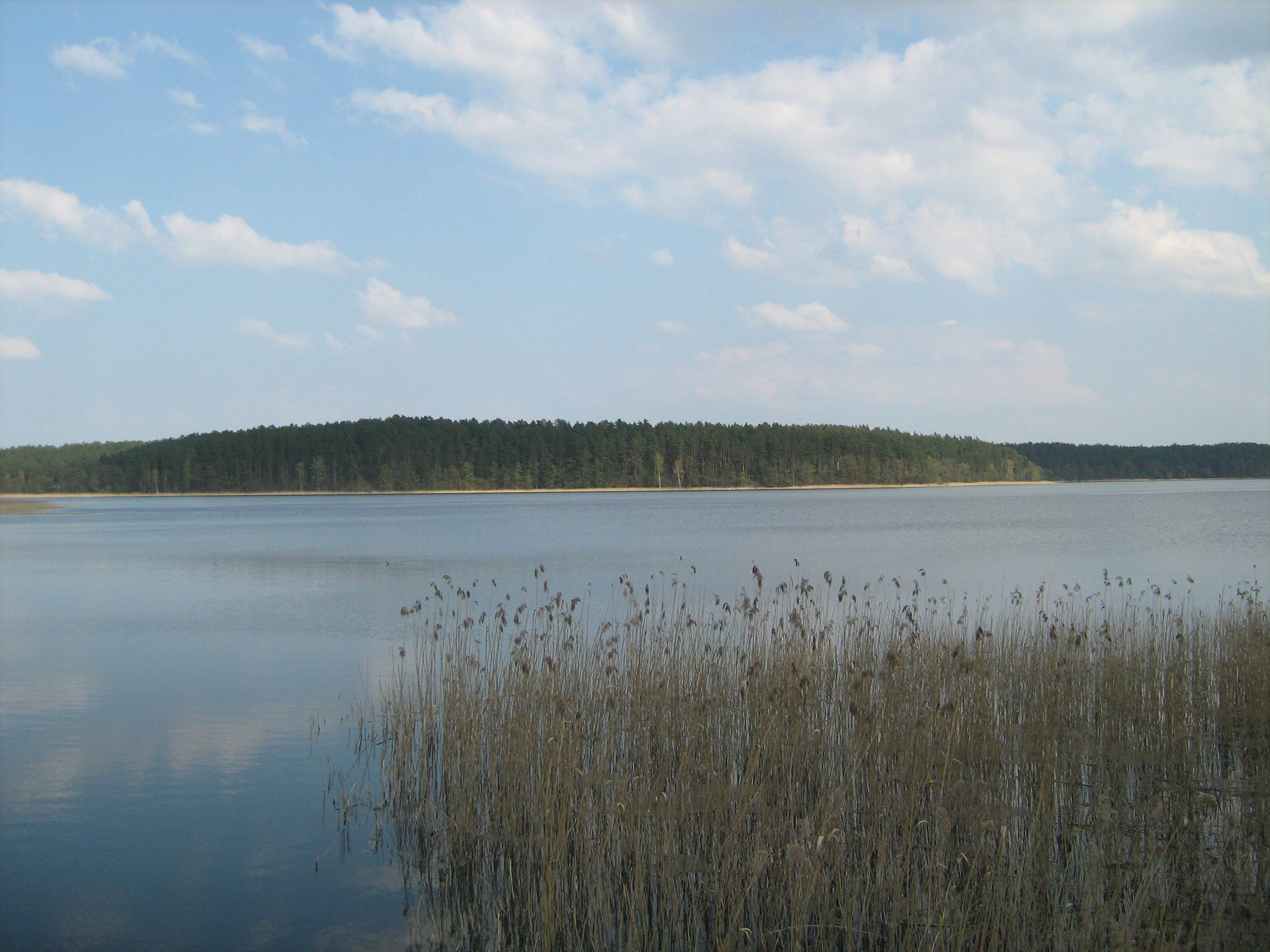
- Orzysz Lake

- Location within Poland
- Coordinates: 53°49′59″N 22°01′35″E
- Type: lake
- Primary outflows: Orzysza
- Basin countries: Poland
- Max. length: 11.7 km (7.3 mi)
- Max. width: 3.3 km (2.1 mi)
- Surface area: 1,070.7 ha (2,646 acres)
- Average depth: 6.6 m (22 ft)
- Max. depth: 36 m (118 ft)
- Water volume: 75.3×10^{6} m^{3} (6.10×10^{4} acre⋅ft)
- Shore length^{1}: 57.6 km (35.8 mi)
- Surface elevation: 119.7 m (393 ft)
- Frozen: For period 1977–1992 usually between 30 December and 15 March with maximum ice thickness 28 cm (11 in)
- Islands: Różany Ostrów, Wysoki Ostrów, Lasek, Czykietówka, Wyspa Miłości
- Settlements: Orzysz, Skomack Wielki, Strzelniki, Kamieńskie, Ostrów, Odoje, Wierzbiny
- ^{1} Shore length is not a well-defined measure.

Orzysz (Polish pronunciation: [ˈɔʐɨʂ], German: Arys-See) is a lake located in the Masurian Lake District, in the Land of the Great Masurian Lakes, in the Warmian-Masurian Voivodeship, in Pisz County, in the urban-rural Gmina Orzysz. On the southwestern shore of the lake is located the town of Orzysz.

The lake is a ribbon lake with an area of 1,070.7 ha (2,646 acres), located at an elevation of 119 metres (390 feet), with a varied depth and forested shores on the southwestern and northeastern shores of the lake. The shore has an irregular shape, which is characterised by many bays along its shoreline, and long narrow peninsulas, which deeply cut through the lake. In the Southern part of the lake there is a long bay which is separated by the twisting Ameryka (America) Peninsula from the nearby Wierzbińskie Lake (70 ha (170 acres)).

The lake has ten islands, with a total area of about 74 ha (180 acres). The largest of them is Różany Ostrów also known as Wyspa Róż at 54 ha (130 acres) which is linked to the mainland by a bridge. The lake is joined with nearby lakes by small canals. The river Orzysza, which flows out of the lake, links it with the nearby lakes Tyrkło and Śniardwy. There is a kayak trail that runs through the area.

The main characteristics of the lake are that of its varying depth and many species of plants; on the shores of the lake, there are forests of different types of pine and spruce trees.

Types of fish in the lake waters include Coregonus albula, common bream, European perch, Northern pike, zander, silver bream, common rudd, common roach and common bleak.

== Ameryka Peninsula ==
The Ameryka peninsula is located in between the two lakes Orzysz and Wierzbińskie, which is sometimes referred to as the Wierzbińskie Bay. From the western part of the lake there is a bridge which crosses a narrow gap. The width of the peninsula ranges from about 100 to 300 metres (330 to 980 feet). In the narrowest parts of the peninsula, both of the lakes can be seen. On both sides of the lake there are overgrown patches of Alnus glutinosa. Some roots of the trees are visible due to waves eroding their soil, creating a separate characteristic to the part of the lake. Both of the lakes are eutrophic and have similar water-based plants. There is a large amount of swamp vegetation, including the following species found in the lake: bugleweed, bittersweet, water mint, yellow water-lily, and Canadian waterweed. In some parts the shore has sand and is easily accessible. There are also synanthrope plants in the lake: burdock, lion's tail, common nettle, cow parsley, tetterwort and common wormwood. To the southeastern part of the lake, the peninsula becomes more wider and the plants become luxuriant. There are different types of plants in that part than elsewhere: there are blueberries, blackberries and moss, and in the autumn mushrooms grow. In the forest there are visible trenches from World War II. Along the southern part of the shore of Wierzbińskie Lake, there is the stretched village Wierzbiny.
