= Chopin (disambiguation) =

Frédéric Chopin (1810–1849) was a Polish composer and pianist.

Chopin may also refer to:

- Chopin (surname), a list of people with the surname

== Places ==
=== Poland ===
- Warsaw Chopin Airport, an airport in Poland
- Chopin University of Music, a musical conservatorium and academy located in Warsaw
- Fryderyk Chopin Museum, a museum in Warsaw
- Statue of Frédéric Chopin, Łazienki Park, Śródmieście, Warsaw
- Frédéric Chopin Street, Warsaw
- Birthplace of Frédéric Chopin, dworek (lit. little manor-house) in Żelazowa Wola near Sochaczew
- Frédéric Chopin Monument, Żelazowa Wola
- Heart of Frédéric Chopin at Holy Cross Church, Warsaw

=== France ===
- Chopin's tombstone in Père Lachaise Cemetery, Paris
- Statue of Frédéric Chopin, Parc Monceau, 8th arrondissement, Paris
- Salon Frédéric Chopin, 4th arrondissement of Paris at 6, Quai d'Orléans, Paris
- Frédéric Chopin Memorial (Paris), a monument in the Luxembourg Garden, 8th arrondissement, Paris

=== United States ===
- Chopin Theatre, an independent performing arts venue located in Wicker Park, Chicago, Illinois
- Chopin Park, park located at 3420 North Long in the Portage Park community area of North Side, Chicago, Illinois
- Chopin Plaza, plaza in Gladstone Park, Chicago, Illinois
- Chopin, Louisiana, an unincorporated community in Natchitoches Parish, Louisiana

=== Other ===
- Memorials to Frédéric Chopin
- Chopin Hill, a hill, Alexander Island, Antarctica
- Chopin Ridge, ridge between Lions Rump and Low Head, King George Island, South Shetland Islands, Antarctic
- Frédéric Chopin Memorial (Shanghai), China
- Statue of Frédéric Chopin, St. Francis Square, Havana, Cuba

== Ships ==
- Chopin (ship), a Polish sailing ship
- Fryderyk Chopin (ship), a Polish sailing ship

== Movies ==
- Chopin: Desire for Love, a 2002 biographical film
- Chopin, a Sonata in Paris (Polish: Chopin, Chopin!) a 2025 Polish period biographical drama film directed by Michał Kwieciński
- Youth of Chopin (Polish: Młodość Chopina), a 1952 Polish film scripted and directed by Aleksander Ford
- Sciopèn (also known as Chopin), a 1982 Italian comedy film directed by Luciano Odorisio
- Il notturno di Chopin, a 2012 Italian film directed by Aldo Lado
- Musical Moments from Chopin, a 1947 cartoon, co-starring Andy Panda and Woody Woodpecker

== Other uses ==
- International Chopin Piano Competition, often called the Chopin Competition, quinquennial piano competition in Warsaw, Poland, held since 1927
- Fryderyk Chopin Institute, Polish organization dedicated to researching and promoting the life and works of Polish composer Frédéric Chopin
- Chopin Year, celebrations commemorating the birth anniversary of Frédéric Chopin in Poland. They took place in 1960 and again in 2010.
- Chopin (opera), a 1901 opera by Giacomo Orefice, libretto by Angiolo Orvieto
- 3784 Chopin, an asteroid
- Chopin (crater), a crater on Mercury
- Chopin (vodka), an alcoholic beverage
- Chopin (unit), an obsolete Scottish unit of volume
- Rosa 'Chopin', a rose cultivar

== See also ==
- Chopin Alveograph, tool for testing flour
- Chopine, a kind of platform shoe worn in 17th-century Spain and Italy
