= Chopin (ship) =

Polish brig built in 1999

History

Poland
- Name: Chopin
- Owner: Polska Telefonia Cyfrowa (1999-2005), Wioska Zeglarska Krzysztof Kosinski (2005 - current)
- Builder: Wioska Żeglarska Krzysztof Kosiński
- Launched: 1999
- In service: 2001
- Homeport: Wierzba (2002-06); Mikołajki (since 2006)

General characteristics
- Type: Passenger ship
- Length: 40.90 m (134 ft 2 in) (overall); 34.00 m (111 ft 7 in) (hull length)
- Beam: 5.70 m (18 ft 8 in)
- Draught: 0.90 m (2 ft 11 in)
- Depth: 2.80 m (9 ft 2 in)
- Propulsion: Sails and engines (2 × 70 kW, 94 hp)
- Sail plan: Brig
- Capacity: 70 passengers, 120 guests (docked)

Chopin is a Polish brig built in 1999 by Wioska Żeglarska Krzysztof Kosiński. She sails the Great Masurian Lakes - the Bełdany Lake, Mikołajki Lake and Śniardwy Lake.

== Design ==
Chopin is designed on the lines of a 19th-century brig. She is 40.90 metres (134 ft 2 in) long overall (34.00 m, 111 ft 7 in hull length), with a beam of 5.70 metres (18 ft 8 in) and a draught of 0.90 metres (2 ft 11 in). Her depth is 2.80 metres (9 ft 2 in). As well as her sails, she is propelled by two engines of 70 kilowatts (94 hp) each.

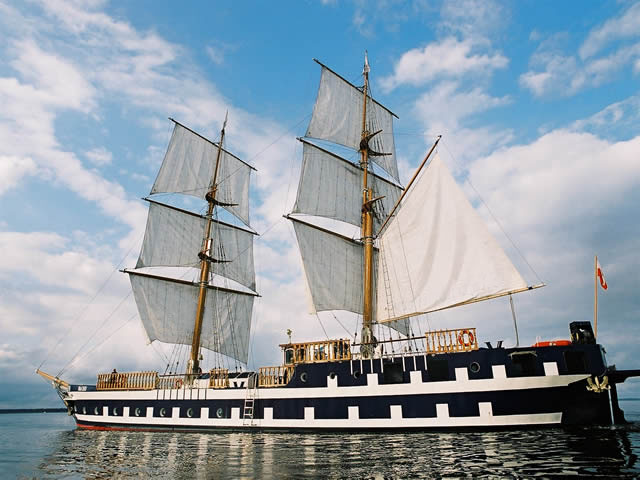
Chopin in 2007 - full view.

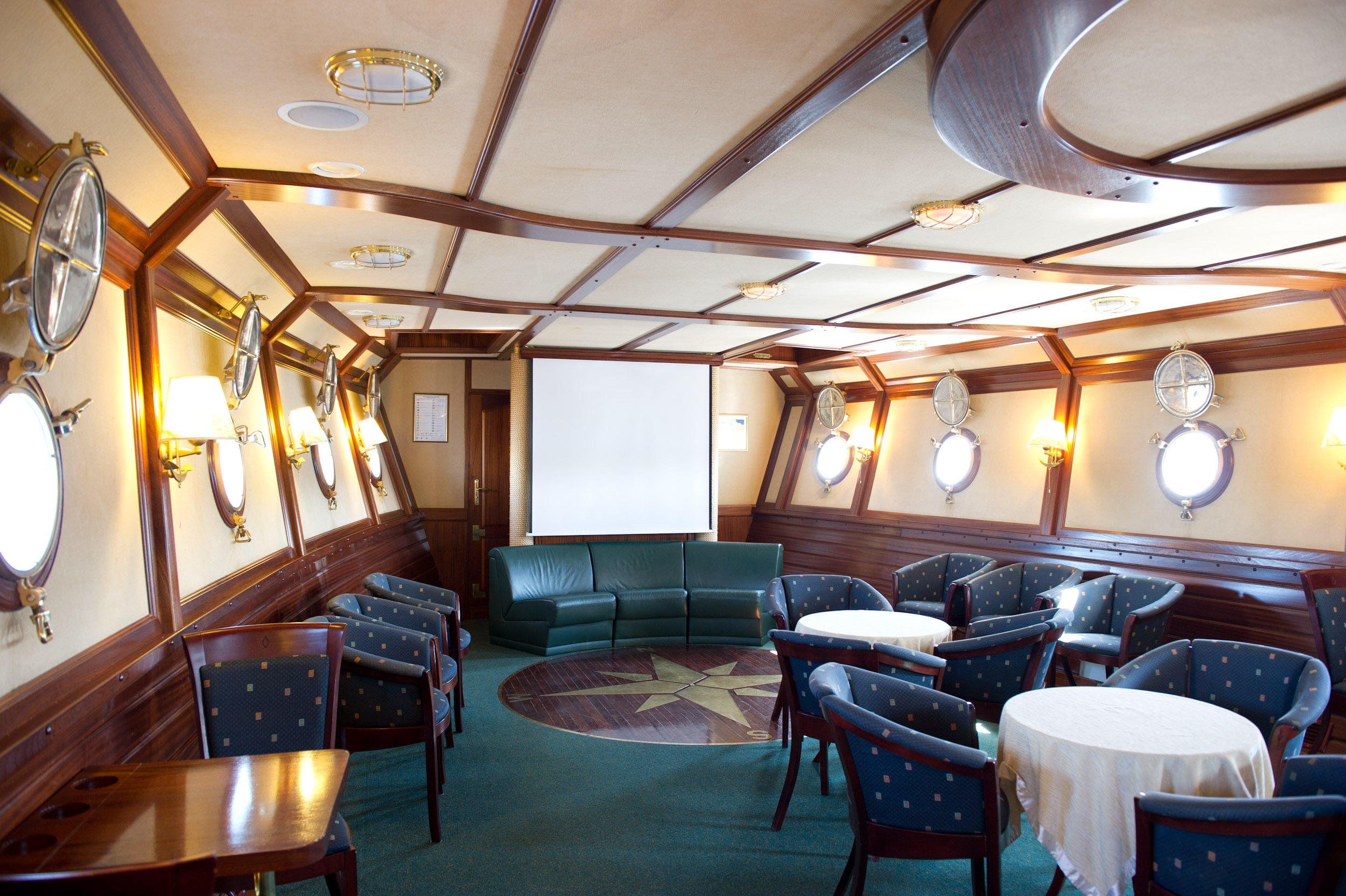
Chopin - conference room.

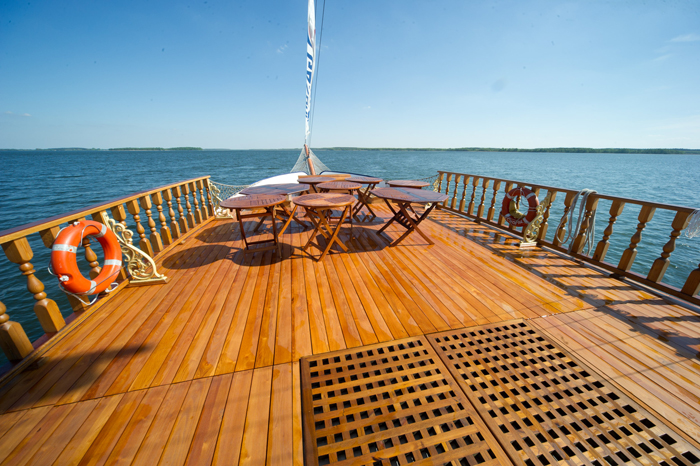
Chopin - view from the deck.

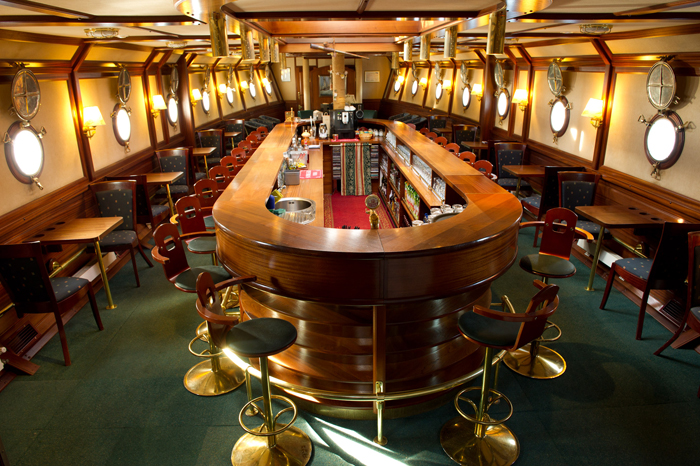
Chopin - bar below the deck.

== History ==
Chopin was built at Płock in 1999 by Wioska Żeglarska Krzysztof Kosiński for Polska Telefonia Cyfrowa. Until 2001, she was moored at Warsaw whilst being fitted out. Chopin took part in an event associated with the 2001 Cutty Sark Tall Ships races. In 2005 the ship was bought by its builder and current owner Krzysztof Kosinski. Current sponsor of the ship is Gaspol SA. Her home port was Wierzba until 2006, when it was changed to Mikołajki.

Chopin sails the Great Masurian Lakes - the Bełdany Lake, Mikołajki Lake and Śniardwy Lake from mid-April to mid-November. She has a capacity of 70 passengers and up to 120 guests are allowed on board when she is in port.

== See also ==
- Chopin (disambiguation)
