= Chopin (surname) =

Chopin is a French surname. The name is believed to be derived from the Old French word "chopine", an old (large) liquid measure approximately equal to an English "quart" or in Scotland a half-pint. Notable people with the surname include:

- Alfred Chopin (1846–1902), convict transported to Western Australia
- Erik Chopin (born 1970), winner of The Biggest Loser (season 3) in 2006
- Félix Chopin (1813–1892), French bronze designer, active in Russia.
- Frédéric Chopin (1810–1849), Polish composer and pianist
- Henri Chopin (1922–2008), avant-garde composer
- Jean-Marie Chopin (1796–1871), French-Russian explorer of the Caucasus
- Kate Chopin (1850–1904), American author
- Nicolas Chopin (1771–1844), teacher of French language, father of Frédéric Chopin
- William Chopin (1827–1900), convict transported to Western Australia

== See also ==
- Chopin (disambiguation)
