= Dziubiele =

- Village
- Location within Poland
- Coordinates: 53°48′12″N 21°43′47″E
- Country: Poland
- Voivodeship: Warmian-Masurian
- County: Pisz
- Gmina: Orzysz

Dziubiele [d͡ʑuˈbjɛlɛ] is a village in the administrative district of Gmina Orzysz, within Pisz County, Warmian-Masurian Voivodeship, in northern Poland.

== Geography ==
Dziubiele is situated on the northern shore of Lake Śniardwy, the largest lake in Poland, approximately 15 kilometres east of Orzysz. The village lies near the boundary between the Masurian Lake District and the Ełk Lakeland. Dąbrowa Hill, rising to approximately 157 metres above sea level, is located around 1.5 kilometres north of the village.

== History ==
Dziubiele was established in 1542 as a rent-paying village under Kulm law. The settlement initially comprised approximately 50 łans of land. By 1564, it had expanded to 55 łans and contained two inns.

== Notable residents ==
- Robert Gyßling (1858–1912), German lawyer and politician who served in the Reichstag.
- Erich Hellmann (1916–1998), German Fallschirmjäger officer
