= Mikosze =

- Village
- Location within Poland
- Coordinates: 53°49′N 21°56′E
- Country: Poland
- Voivodeship: Warmian-Masurian
- County: Pisz
- Gmina: Orzysz
- Time zone: UTC+1 (CET)
  - Summer (DST): UTC+2 (CEST)
- Vehicle registration: NPI

Mikosze ([miˈkɔʂɛ]; German: Mykossen) is a village in the administrative district of Gmina Orzysz, within Pisz County, Warmian-Masurian Voivodeship, in north-eastern Poland.

In the 17th century, Polish nobleman Fryderyk Pułaski lived in the village. His nobility was confirmed by King Władysław IV Vasa.
