= Cierzpięty, Pisz County =

Cierzpięty
- Village
- Location within Poland
- Coordinates: 53°51′47″N 21°50′50″E
- Country: Poland
- Voivodeship: Warmian-Masurian
- County: Pisz
- Gmina: Orzysz

Cierzpięty [t͡ɕɛʂˈpjɛntɨ] is a village in the administrative district of Gmina Orzysz, within Pisz County, Warmian-Masurian Voivodeship, in northern Poland.
