= Tuchlin-Gajówka =

- Settlement
- Location within Poland
- Coordinates: 53°49′50″N 21°48′25″E
- Country: Poland
- Voivodeship: Warmian-Masurian
- County: Pisz
- Gmina: Orzysz

Tuchlin-Gajówka [ˈtuxlin ɡaˈjufka] is a settlement in the administrative district of Gmina Orzysz, within Pisz County, Warmian-Masurian Voivodeship, in northern Poland.
