= Chmielewo, Pisz County =

Chmielewo
- Village
- Location within Poland
- Coordinates: 53°49′6″N 21°45′41″E
- Country: Poland
- Voivodeship: Warmian-Masurian
- County: Pisz
- Gmina: Orzysz

Chmielewo [xmjɛˈlɛvɔ] (German Chmielewen, 1938–1945 Talau) is a village in the administrative district of Gmina Orzysz, within Pisz County, Warmian-Masurian Voivodeship, in northern Poland.
