= Fryderyk Chopin (ship) =

Polish brig-rigged sailing-ship

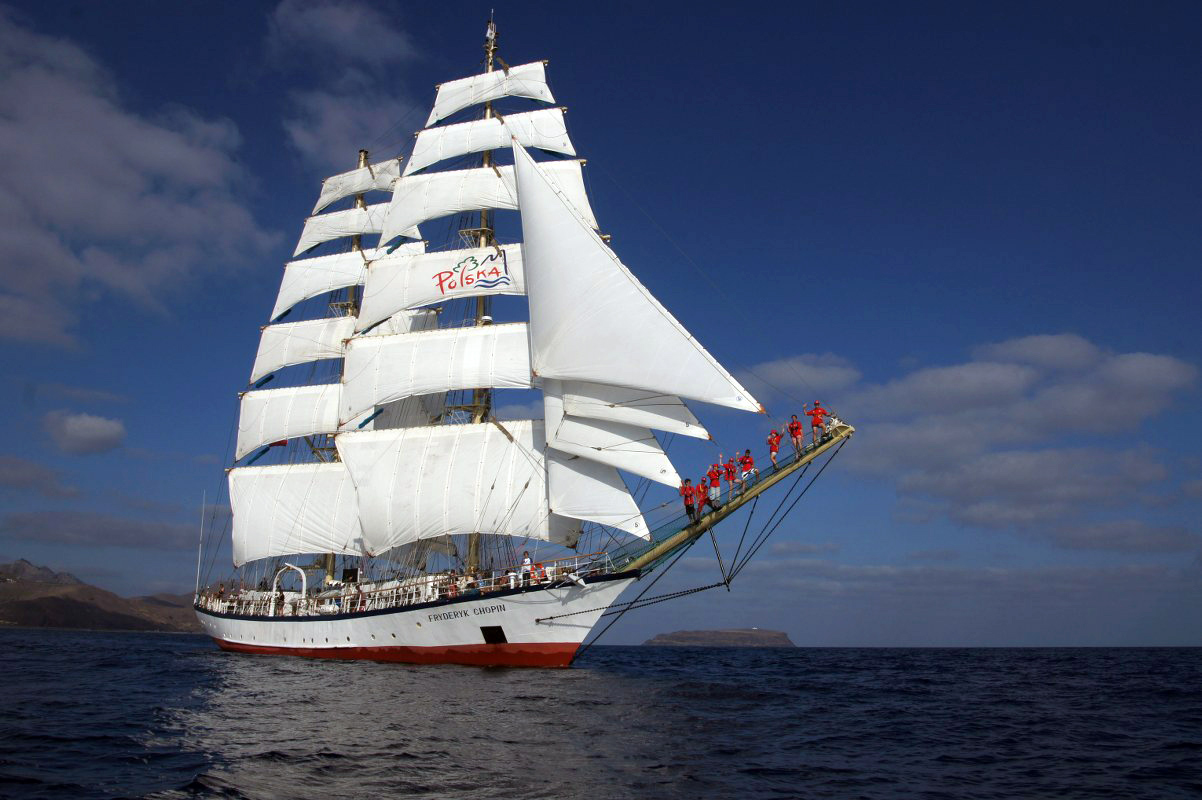
- Fryderyk Chopin

History

Poland
- Name: Fryderyk Chopin
- Operator: 3Oceans, Poland
- Builder: Dora Shipyard, Gdynia, Poland
- Launched: 1992
- Home port: Szczecin, Poland
- Identification: IMO number: 9030747; MMSI number: 261000290; Callsign: SPS2298
- Status: Active

General characteristics
- Tonnage: 306 BRT
- Displacement: 400 tons
- Length: 181 ft (55 m)
- Beam: 28 ft (8.5 m)
- Draft: 13.1 ft (4.0 m)
- Propulsion: sail, 520 hp diesel
- Complement: 50
- Notes: Sail area: 1200 m²

Fryderyk Chopin is a Polish brig-rigged sailing-ship.

== History ==
The ship was designed by Polish naval architect Zygmunt Choreń, named in honour of the early to mid 19th century Polish composer Fryderyk Chopin, and launched in 1992 in the Dora Shipyard, Gdynia, Poland. She was chartered for a year by West Island College (Class Afloat) in Nova Scotia to expand their Tall Ship educational program. After that, she was operated by the European School of Law and Administration, a private university in Poland.

On 29 October 2010 the vessel was reported as in distress 100 miles off the Isles of Scilly having lost both masts in gale force winds and heavy seas. She was on a three and a half month cruise from the Netherlands to the Caribbean with 47 crew aboard including 36 trainees aged 14 years. Although there was an engine the ship's master was unwilling to use it for fear of trailing debris snagging on the propeller. There were no reported injuries. The ship was towed into the sheltered waters of Falmouth Bay after 100 miles and three days on tow by a small fishing trawler Nova Spero; whose Captain, Shaun Edwards answered the Mayday call.

Since 2011, the ship is operated by 3Oceans, a Polish private ship operator. She serves as the ship of The Blue School, a sail training project ran by STS Fryderyk Chopin foundation.

Under the new owner the vessel won many important races and titles: The Tall Ships Races in 2012, 2015 and 2019 as well as Boston Teapot Trophy in 2019 and 2021.

== Fryderyk Chopin in the media ==
The movie The Blue School Diaries was shot on board.

== See also ==
- Chopin (ship)
- Fryderyk Chopin
