= Klusy =

- Village
- Location within Poland
- Coordinates: 53°47′39″N 22°7′17″E
- Country: Poland
- Voivodeship: Warmian-Masurian
- County: Pisz
- Gmina: Orzysz
- Population: 80

Klusy [ˈklusɨ] is a village in the administrative district of Gmina Orzysz, within Pisz County, Warmian-Masurian Voivodeship, in northern Poland.
