= Osiki =

- Village
- Location within Poland
- Coordinates: 53°54′N 21°46′E
- Country: Poland
- Voivodeship: Warmian-Masurian
- County: Pisz
- Gmina: Orzysz

Osiki [ɔˈɕiki] is a village in the administrative district of Gmina Orzysz, within Pisz County, Warmian-Masurian Voivodeship, in northern Poland.
