= Tuchlin, Warmian-Masurian Voivodeship =

Tuchlin
- Village
- Location within Poland
- Coordinates: 53°49′N 21°48′E
- Country: Poland
- Voivodeship: Warmian-Masurian
- County: Pisz
- Gmina: Orzysz
- Population (approx.): 100

Tuchlin [ˈtuxlin] (German: Tuchlinnen) is a village in the administrative district of Gmina Orzysz, within Pisz County, Warmian-Masurian Voivodeship, in northern Poland.

The village has an approximate population of 100.

Demographics. Soltis, Small scale Farmers, Foresters and workers and 1 English Teacher.

Principal Production. Potatoes, Corn, Sweetcorn, Dairy and Pork Products

Although contained within the national park as the north shore, the biodiversity is changing due to the elevated groundwater levels. This is to say that what was productive arable farmland is rapidly making way to freshwater fenland/marginal fauna. This situation is in negotiation with the authorities to revert to natural state i.e. managed fresh water levels to provide the best humano/biodiversity for the area.
