= Kępa, Warmian-Masurian Voivodeship =

Kępa
- Settlement
- Location within Poland
- Coordinates: 53°50′44″N 21°44′23″E
- Country: Poland
- Voivodeship: Warmian-Masurian
- County: Pisz
- Gmina: Orzysz

Kępa [ˈkɛmpa] is a settlement in the administrative district of Gmina Orzysz, within Pisz County, Warmian-Masurian Voivodeship, in northern Poland.
