= Okartowo-Tartak =

- Settlement
- Location within Poland
- Coordinates: 53°48′10″N 21°52′16″E
- Country: Poland
- Voivodeship: Warmian-Masurian
- County: Pisz
- Gmina: Orzysz

Okartowo-Tartak [ɔkarˈtɔvɔ ˈtartak] is a settlement in the administrative district of Gmina Orzysz, within Pisz County, Warmian-Masurian Voivodeship, in northern Poland.

This settlement did not exist before 1945.
