= Szwejkówko =

- Village
- Location within Poland
- Coordinates: 53°46′59″N 21°54′39″E
- Country: Poland
- Voivodeship: Warmian-Masurian
- County: Pisz
- Gmina: Orzysz
- Population: 180

Szwejkówko [ʂfɛi̯ˈkufkɔ] (German: Mittel Schweykowen) is a village in the administrative district of Gmina Orzysz, within Pisz County, Warmian-Masurian Voivodeship, in northern Poland. The village has a population of 180. Historians estimate the village was founded in the early 12th century.
