= Grądy, Pisz County =

Grądy
- Village
- Location within Poland
- Coordinates: 53°49′27″N 21°57′14″E
- Country: Poland
- Voivodeship: Warmian-Masurian
- County: Pisz
- Gmina: Orzysz

Grądy [ˈɡrɔndɨ] is a village in the administrative district of Gmina Orzysz, within Pisz County, Warmian-Masurian Voivodeship, in northern Poland.
