= Nowa Wieś, Pisz County =

Nowa Wieś
- Village
- Location within Poland
- Coordinates: 53°49′37″N 21°44′23″E
- Country: Poland
- Voivodeship: Warmian-Masurian
- County: Pisz
- Gmina: Orzysz
- Population: 40

Nowa Wieś [ˈnɔva ˈvjɛɕ] is a village in the administrative district of Gmina Orzysz, within Pisz County, Warmian-Masurian Voivodeship, in northern Poland.
