= Górki, Pisz County =

Górki
- Settlement
- Location within Poland
- Coordinates: 53°52′45″N 21°43′51″E
- Country: Poland
- Voivodeship: Warmian-Masurian
- County: Pisz
- Gmina: Orzysz

Górki [ˈɡurki] is a settlement in the administrative district of Gmina Orzysz, within Pisz County, Warmian-Masurian Voivodeship, in northern Poland.
