= Ublik =

- Village
- Location within Poland
- Coordinates: 53°53′N 21°54′E
- Country: Poland
- Voivodeship: Warmian-Masurian
- County: Pisz
- Gmina: Orzysz

Ublik [ˈublik] (German: Ublick) is a village in the administrative district of Gmina Orzysz, within Pisz County, Warmian-Masurian Voivodeship, in northern Poland.
