= Wężewo, Pisz County =

Wężewo
- Village
- Location within Poland
- Coordinates: 53°48′57″N 21°50′43″E
- Country: Poland
- Voivodeship: Warmian-Masurian
- County: Pisz
- Gmina: Orzysz
- Population: 340

Wężewo [vɛ̃ˈʐɛvɔ] (German: Wensewen) is a village in the administrative district of Gmina Orzysz, within Pisz County, Warmian-Masurian Voivodeship, in northern Poland.

The village has a population of 340.
