= Zastrużne =

- Village
- Location within Poland
- Coordinates: 53°51′7″N 21°47′32″E
- Country: Poland
- Voivodeship: Warmian-Masurian
- County: Pisz
- Gmina: Orzysz
- Population: 80

Zastrużne [zasˈtruʐnɛ] (German: Sastrosnen) is a village in the administrative district of Gmina Orzysz, within Pisz County, Warmian-Masurian Voivodeship, in northern Poland.

The village has a population of 80.
