= Golec, Warmian-Masurian Voivodeship =

Golec
- Settlement
- Location within Poland
- Coordinates: 53°52′33″N 21°44′15″E
- Country: Poland
- Voivodeship: Warmian-Masurian
- County: Pisz
- Gmina: Orzysz

Golec [ˈɡɔlɛt͡s] is a settlement in the administrative district of Gmina Orzysz, within Pisz County, Warmian-Masurian Voivodeship, in northern Poland.
