= Pianki, Warmian-Masurian Voivodeship =

Pianki
- Village
- Location within Poland
- Coordinates: 53°51′N 21°56′E
- Country: Poland
- Voivodeship: Warmian-Masurian
- County: Pisz
- Gmina: Orzysz

Pianki [ˈpjanki] (German: Pianken) is a village in the administrative district of Gmina Orzysz, within Pisz County, Warmian-Masurian Voivodeship, in northern Poland.
