= Dziubiele Małe =

- Settlement
- Location within Poland
- Coordinates: 53°49′N 21°43′E
- Country: Poland
- Voivodeship: Warmian-Masurian
- County: Pisz
- Gmina: Orzysz

Dziubiele Małe [d͡ʑuˈbjɛlɛ ˈmawɛ] is a settlement in the administrative district of Gmina Orzysz, within Pisz County, Warmian-Masurian Voivodeship, in northern Poland.
