= Drozdowo, Pisz County =

Drozdowo
- Village
- Location within Poland
- Coordinates: 53°51′3″N 21°47′12″E
- Country: Poland
- Voivodeship: Warmian-Masurian
- County: Pisz
- Gmina: Orzysz

Drozdowo [drɔzˈdɔvɔ] is a village in the administrative district of Gmina Orzysz, within Pisz County, Warmian-Masurian Voivodeship, in northern Poland.
