= Ogródek, Warmian-Masurian Voivodeship =

Ogródek
- Village
- Location within Poland
- Coordinates: 53°48′31″N 22°6′5″E
- Country: Poland
- Voivodeship: Warmian-Masurian
- County: Pisz
- Gmina: Orzysz
- Population: 200

Ogródek [ɔˈɡrudɛk] is a village in the administrative district of Gmina Orzysz, within Pisz County, Warmian-Masurian Voivodeship, in northern Poland.
