= Grzegorze =

- Village
- Location within Poland
- Coordinates: 53°47′58″N 21°53′52″E
- Country: Poland
- Voivodeship: Warmian-Masurian
- County: Pisz
- Gmina: Orzysz

Grzegorze [ɡʐɛˈɡɔʐɛ] is a village in the administrative district of Gmina Orzysz, within Pisz County, Warmian-Masurian Voivodeship, in northern Poland.
