= Grądy Podmiejskie =

- Settlement
- Location within Poland
- Coordinates: 53°49′51″N 21°57′05″E
- Country: Poland
- Voivodeship: Warmian-Masurian
- County: Pisz
- Gmina: Orzysz

Grądy Podmiejskie [ˈɡrɔndɨ pɔdˈmjɛi̯skʲɛ] is a settlement in the administrative district of Gmina Orzysz, within Pisz County, Warmian-Masurian Voivodeship, in northern Poland.
