= Suchy Róg =

- Village
- Location within Poland
- Coordinates: 53°47′23″N 21°45′59″E
- Country: Poland
- Voivodeship: Warmian-Masurian
- County: Pisz
- Gmina: Orzysz
- Population: 70

Suchy Róg [ˈsuxɨ ˈruk] (German: Trockenhorn) is a village in the administrative district of Gmina Orzysz, Pisz County, Warmian-Masurian Voivodeship, in northern Poland.

The village has a population of 70 inhabitants.
