= Mikołajskie Lake =

Lake in Poland

- Jezioro Mikołajskie (Polish)
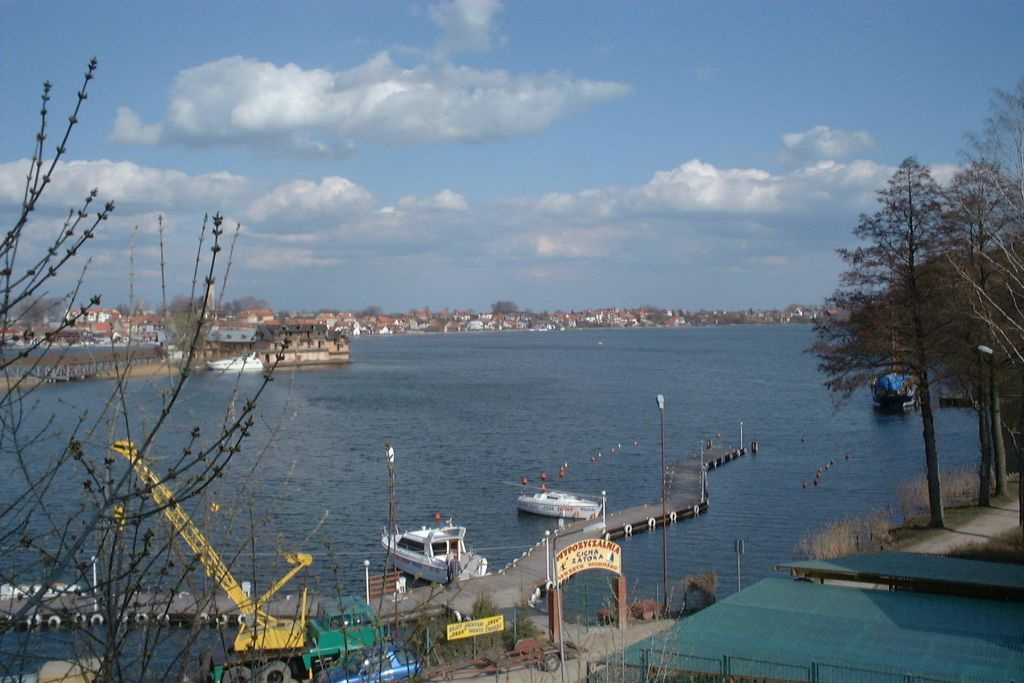
- View of the lake and the Mikołajki harbor

- Location within Poland
- Location: Masurian Lake District, Masuria, Poland
- Coordinates: 53.777°N 21.591°E
- Max. length: 5.8 km (3.6 mi)
- Max. width: 1.6 km (0.99 mi)
- Surface area: 497.9 ha (1,230 acres)
- Average depth: 11.2 m (37 ft)
- Max. depth: 25.9 m (85 ft)
- Water volume: 55.7×10^{6} m^{3} (1.97×10^{9} cu ft)
- Shore length^{1}: 15.1 km (9.4 mi)
- Surface elevation: 116.1 m (381 ft)
- Frozen: For period 1977–1992 usually between 4 January and 16 March with maximum ice thickness 32 cm (13 in)
- ^{1} Shore length is not a well-defined measure.

Mikołajskie Lake (Polish: Jezioro Mikołajskie; German: Nikolaiker See) is glacial lake in Masurian Lake District in Poland.

Mikołajskie Lake covers about 5 square kilometres (1.9 sq mi) and is 5.8 kilometres (3.6 mi) long and 1.6 kilometres (0.99 mi) wide with a maximum depth of 25.9 metres (85 feet).

In the north, Mikołajskie Lake is connected with the Tałty Lake under the road bridge in Mikołajki. To one of the pillars of the bridge, on a spring, is chained the King of Vendaces (Fish King, in Polish: Król Sielaw, Rybi Król, legendary king of Masuria). In the south-east, Mikołajskie Lake is connected with the Śniardwy Lake by the Przeczka strait within Dybowski Róg and Popielski Róg. In the south-west, Mikołajskie Lake is connected with the Bełdany Lake. On the west bank extends the Pisz Forest.

On the shore of the lake are the towns: Mikołajki, Dybowo, Kulinowo, Wierzba.

Notable wildlife:

- Eurasian bittern (Botaurus stellaris)
- Common goldeneye (Bucephala clangula)
- Ruff (Philomachus pugnax)
- Black-throated loon (Gavia arctica)
- Little gull (Larus minutus)
