= Matyszczyki =

- Village
- Location within Poland
- Coordinates: 53°51′30″N 21°49′7″E
- Country: Poland
- Voivodeship: Warmian-Masurian
- County: Pisz
- Gmina: Orzysz
- Population: 30

Matyszczyki [matɨʂˈt͡ʂɨki] is a village in the administrative district of Gmina Orzysz, within Pisz County, Warmian-Masurian Voivodeship, in northern Poland.
