= Sumki =

- Settlement
- Location within Poland
- Coordinates: 53°50′39″N 21°57′0″E
- Country: Poland
- Voivodeship: Warmian-Masurian
- County: Pisz
- Gmina: Orzysz

Sumki [ˈsumki] (German: Sumken) is a settlement in the administrative district of Gmina Orzysz, within Pisz County, Warmian-Masurian Voivodeship, in northern Poland.
