= Rostki Skomackie =

- Village
- Location within Poland
- Coordinates: 53°48′28″N 22°03′48″E
- Country: Poland
- Voivodeship: Warmian-Masurian
- County: Pisz
- Gmina: Orzysz

Rostki Skomackie [ˈrɔstki skɔˈmat͡skʲɛ] (German: Rostken) is a village in the administrative district of Gmina Orzysz, within Pisz County, Warmian-Masurian Voivodeship, in northern Poland.
