= Okartowo-Przystanek =

- Settlement
- Location within Poland
- Coordinates: 53°48′26″N 21°51′17″E
- Country: Poland
- Voivodeship: Warmian-Masurian
- County: Pisz
- Gmina: Orzysz

Okartowo-Przystanek [ɔkarˈtɔvɔ pʂɨsˈtanɛk] is a settlement in the administrative district of Gmina Orzysz, within Pisz County, Warmian-Masurian Voivodeship, in northern Poland.
