= Leśniczówka Koźle =

- Village
- Location within Poland
- Coordinates: 53°45′32″N 22°01′55″E
- Country: Poland
- Voivodeship: Warmian-Masurian
- County: Pisz
- Gmina: Orzysz

Leśniczówka Koźle (Polish pronunciation: [lɛɕɲiˈtʂufka ˈkɔʑlɛ]) is a village in the administrative district of Gmina Orzysz, within Pisz County, Warmian-Masurian Voivodeship, in northern Poland.
