= Aleksandrowo, Warmian-Masurian Voivodeship =

Aleksandrowo
- Settlement
- Location within Poland
- Coordinates: 53°50′15″N 21°56′14″E
- Country: Poland
- Voivodeship: Warmian-Masurian
- County: Pisz
- Gmina: Orzysz
- Time zone: UTC+1 (CET)
  - Summer (DST): UTC+2 (CEST)
- Vehicle registration: NPI

Aleksandrowo [alɛksanˈdrɔvɔ] is a settlement in the administrative district of Gmina Orzysz, within Pisz County, Warmian-Masurian Voivodeship, in north-eastern Poland.
