= Zdęgówko =

- Village
- Location within Poland
- Coordinates: 53°48′51″N 21°48′3″E
- Country: Poland
- Voivodeship: Warmian-Masurian
- County: Pisz
- Gmina: Orzysz

Zdęgówko [zdɛnˈɡufkɔ] (German: Klein Sdengowen) is a village in the administrative district of Gmina Orzysz, within Pisz County, Warmian-Masurian Voivodeship, in northern Poland.
