= Dąbrówka, Pisz County =

Dąbrówka
- Village
- Location within Poland
- Coordinates: 53°52′N 21°45′E
- Country: Poland
- Voivodeship: Warmian-Masurian
- County: Pisz
- Gmina: Orzysz
- Population (approx.): 380

Dąbrówka [dɔmˈbrufka] is a village in the administrative district of Gmina Orzysz, within Pisz County, Warmian-Masurian Voivodeship, in northern Poland.
