= Rzęśniki-Leśniczówka =

- Settlement
- Location within Poland
- Coordinates: 53°50′30″N 21°59′14″E
- Country: Poland
- Voivodeship: Warmian-Masurian
- County: Pisz
- Gmina: Orzysz

Rzęśniki-Leśniczówka (Polish pronunciation: [ʐɛ̃ɕˈɲikʲi lɛɕɲiˈtʂufka]; German: Forsthaus Nickelsberg) is a settlement in the administrative district of Gmina Orzysz, within Pisz County, Warmian-Masurian Voivodeship, in northern Poland.
