= Okartowo =

- Village
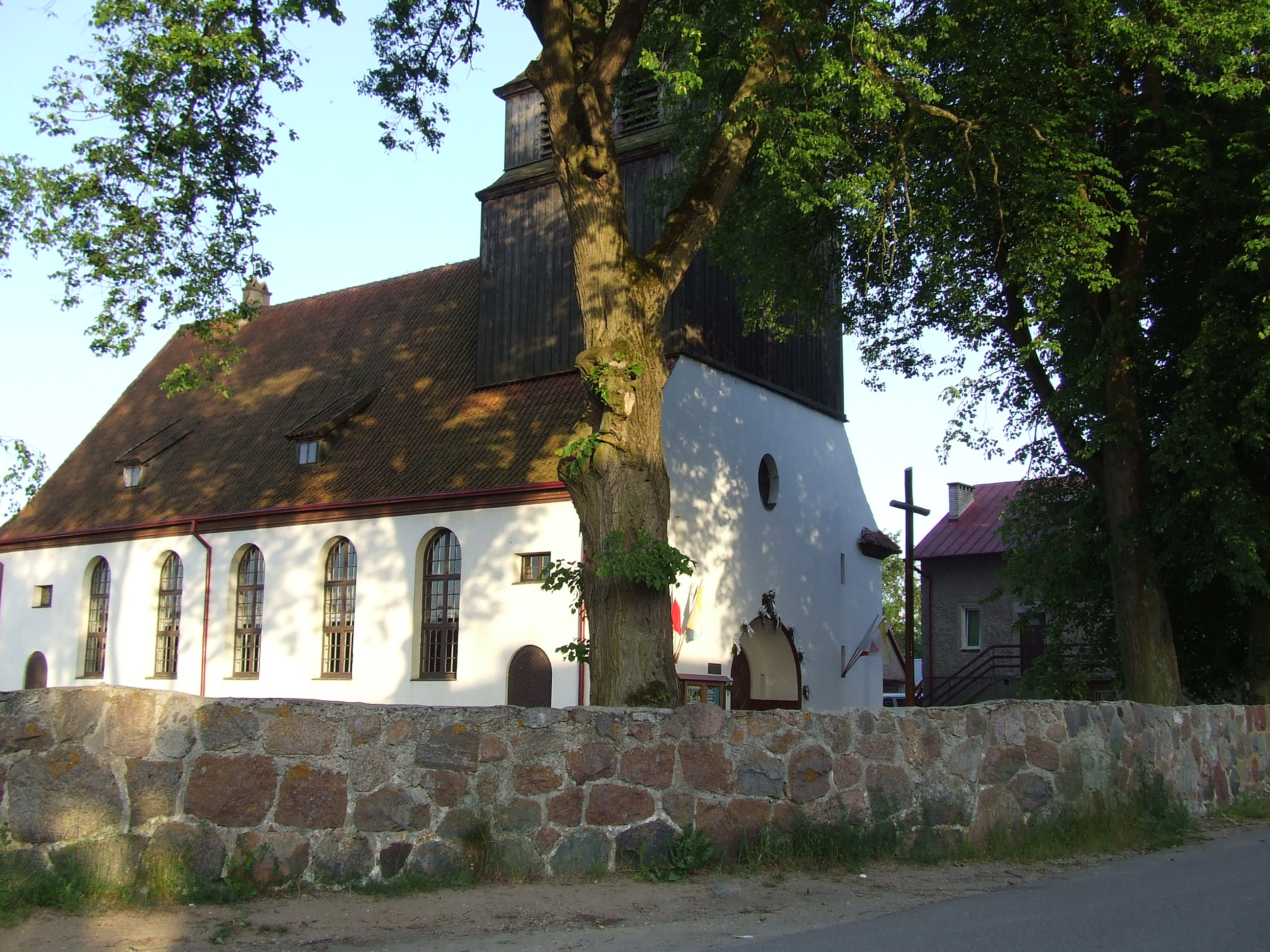
- Church of the Immaculate Heart of Virgin Mary

- Location within Poland
- Coordinates: 53°48′18″N 21°51′33″E
- Country: Poland
- Voivodeship: Warmian-Masurian
- County: Pisz
- Gmina: Orzysz

Okartowo [ɔkarˈtɔvɔ] (German : Eckersberg) is a village in the administrative district of Gmina Orzysz, within Pisz County, Warmian-Masurian Voivodeship, in northern Poland.

== History ==
The Teutonic Order built a castle (a so-called Ordensburg) called Eckersburg here in c. 1340; it was subordinate to the castle of Balga. Several battles were fought here and sometime around 1361 it was destroyed by Lithuanian troops under the command of Kęstutis. Rebuilt, it was again destroyed by the soldiers of Kęstutis in 1378. After this, it was abandoned by the Teutonic Order as a fortification. The village grew up nearby the castle but suffered from history (it was pillaged by Tatars during the Deluge, occupied by Russian troops during the Seven Years' War and struck by the plague) and never developed beyond a small settlement. In 1782, it had 121 inhabitants. After World War II, it became part of Poland.
