= Orzysz =

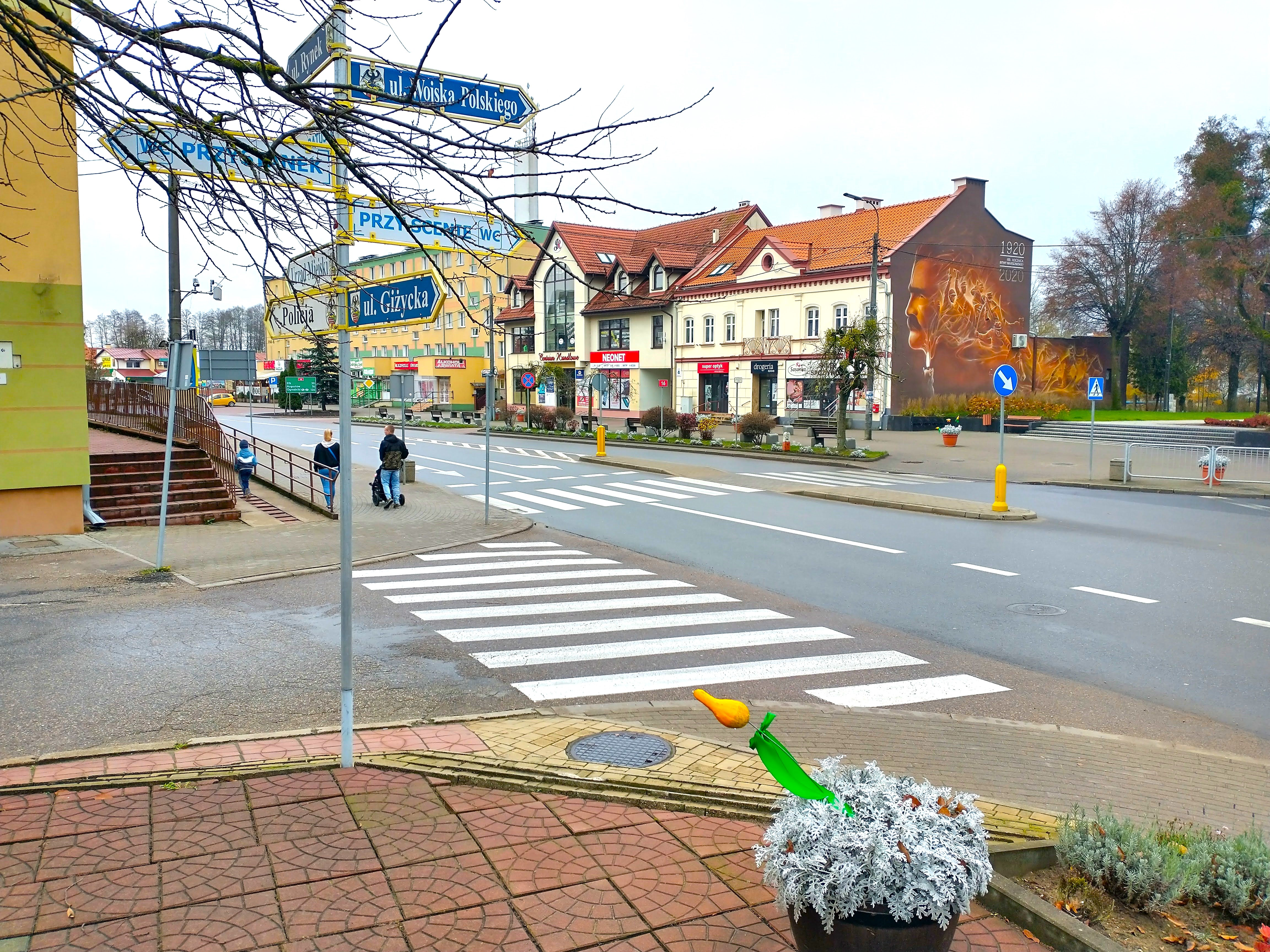
- Orzysz town center

- Flag Coat of arms

- Location within Poland
- Coordinates: 53°48′20″N 21°56′45″E
- Country: Poland
- Voivodeship: Warmian-Masurian
- County: Pisz
- Gmina: Orzysz
- Established: 1443
- Town rights: 1725

Government
  - Mayor: Zbigniew Włodkowski

Area
  - Total: 8.16 km^{2} (3.15 sq mi)

Population (2017)
  - Total: 5,615
  - Density: 688/km^{2} (1,780/sq mi)
- Time zone: UTC+1 (CET)
  - Summer (DST): UTC+2 (CEST)
- Postal code: 12-250
- Vehicle registration: NPI
- Website: http://www.orzysz.pl

Orzysz (English pronunciation Ozis [ˈɔʐɨʂ], German: Arys) is a town in northeastern Poland, in the Pisz County, Warmian-Masurian Voivodeship, with 7,512 inhabitants (2007). It is located on Orzysz Lake in the region of Masuria.

A garrison of the Polish Armed Forces is located in Orzysz, and there is a proving ground near the town.

== History ==
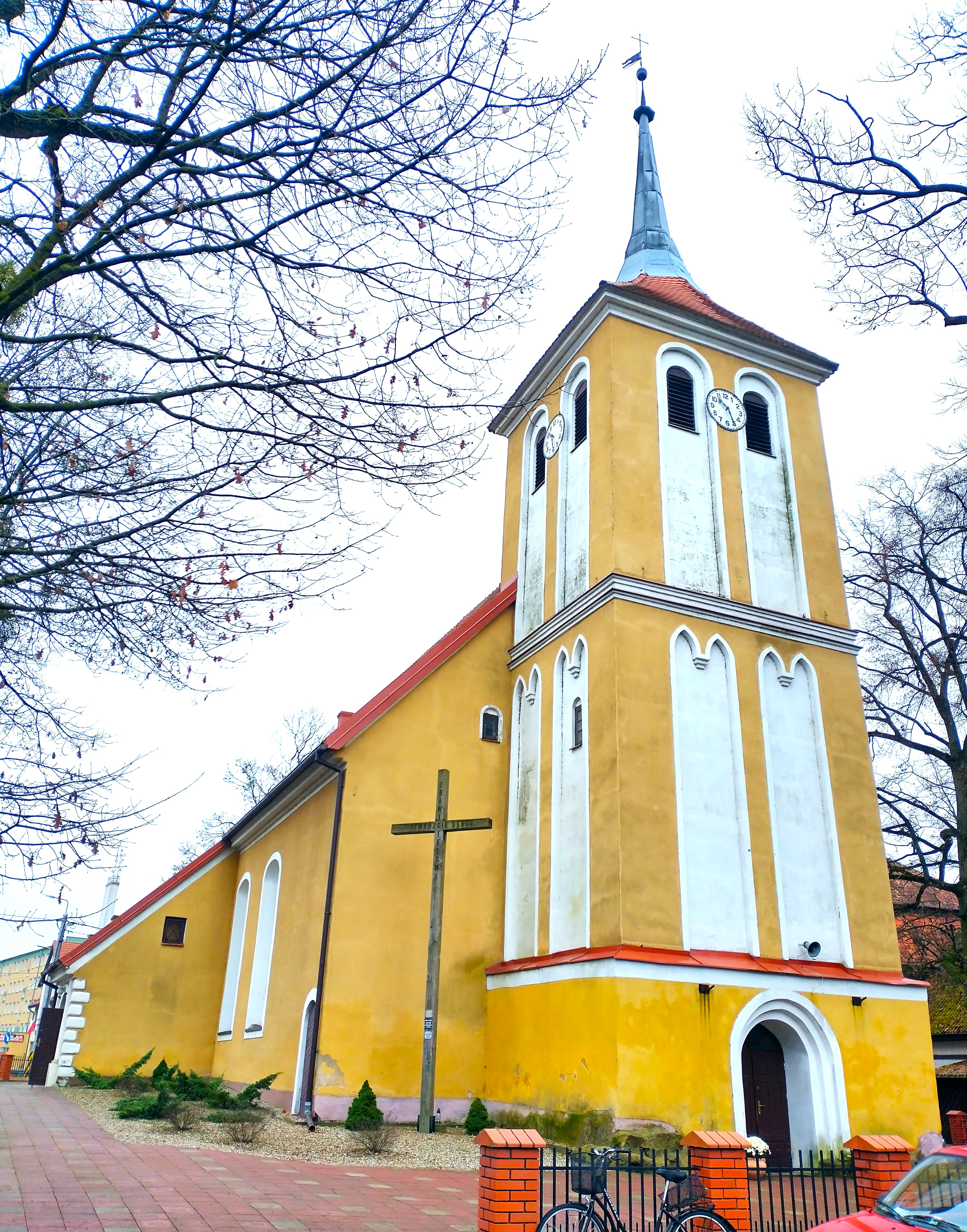
Church of Our Lady of the Scapular, built in 1530

The location of the town has been inhabited for a long time. In 1895 remains of a settlement dated to c. 300-1000 AD were discovered near the town on the shores of Lake Orzysz. The present settlement was founded by Wawrzyniec Polak, who in 1443 was allowed to establish the settlement by the Grand Master of the Teutonic Order Konrad von Erlichshausen. In 1454, Polish King Casimir IV Jagiellon incorporated the region to the Kingdom of Poland upon the request of the anti-Teutonic Prussian Confederation, and the Thirteen Years' War broke out. After the Peace of Toruń in 1466, the Teutonic Order regained authority over the town as a fief of the Polish Crown. As of 1539, the population of the settlement was solely Polish. A local parish was established in 1544, and its first preacher was named Maciej.

After Reformation until 1702 church services in the only church were conducted in the Masurian dialects of Polish, spoken by the ethnically Polish majority of the town's population. A year earlier, in 1701, the settlement became part of the Kingdom of Prussia. It was subjected to Germanisation policies, and in 1796 a local Prussian official filed a complaint against the local parish pastor for not complying with these policies and continuing schooling in Polish.

The population of Arys in 1740 was 640, and in 1782 about 900. The population of Arys slowly increased. There were 85 craftsmen recorded in 1775, a majority of them shoemakers. The town, located on a trading route, was granted town rights in 1725 by Frederick William I of Prussia. The town has been militarily occupied frequently. During the Seven Years' War it was held by Russian troops for four years. During Napoleonic Wars, French and Russian troops were quartered in the town in 1806–1807. A fire destroyed almost the entire town in 1826. The town became impoverished as a result of the fire and the collapse of the local economy.

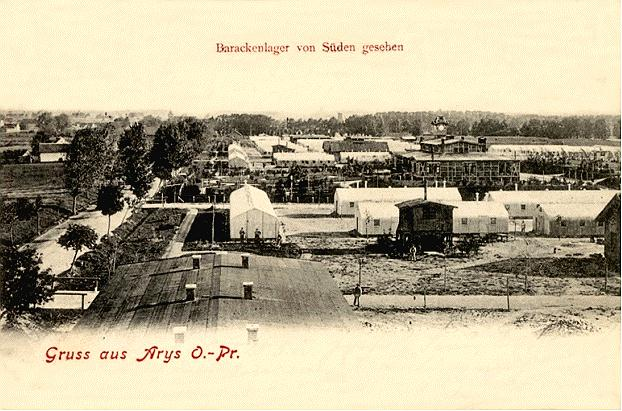
The proving ground in ca. 1900

According to Kingdom of Prussia records, in 1834 600 residents were Polish and 502 Germans, according to Jan Bałdowski anyone who knew the German language was counted as ethnically German by the Prussian authorities. At the same time around 100 inhabitants did not speak Polish, according to other sources. In the second half of the 19th century, the town slowly developed again and its population grew. The populace remained predominantly Polish by ethnicity and Protestant by confession, and in the late 19th century the local parish was composed of 4,450 Poles and 1,000 Germans.

The Prussian Army's proving ground Arys was founded in 1891.

=== 20th century ===
During World War I, several battles were fought between the German and Russian armies in 1914 and 1915 in the area of Arys. The town was held by Russian troops for 20 days and heavily damaged.

On 11 July 1920 the East Prussian plebiscite, mandated by the Versailles Treaty, was held in the District of Allenstein (now Olsztyn), which included Arys. District-wide results were 1,480 votes for Germany and only 1 (one) vote for Poland.

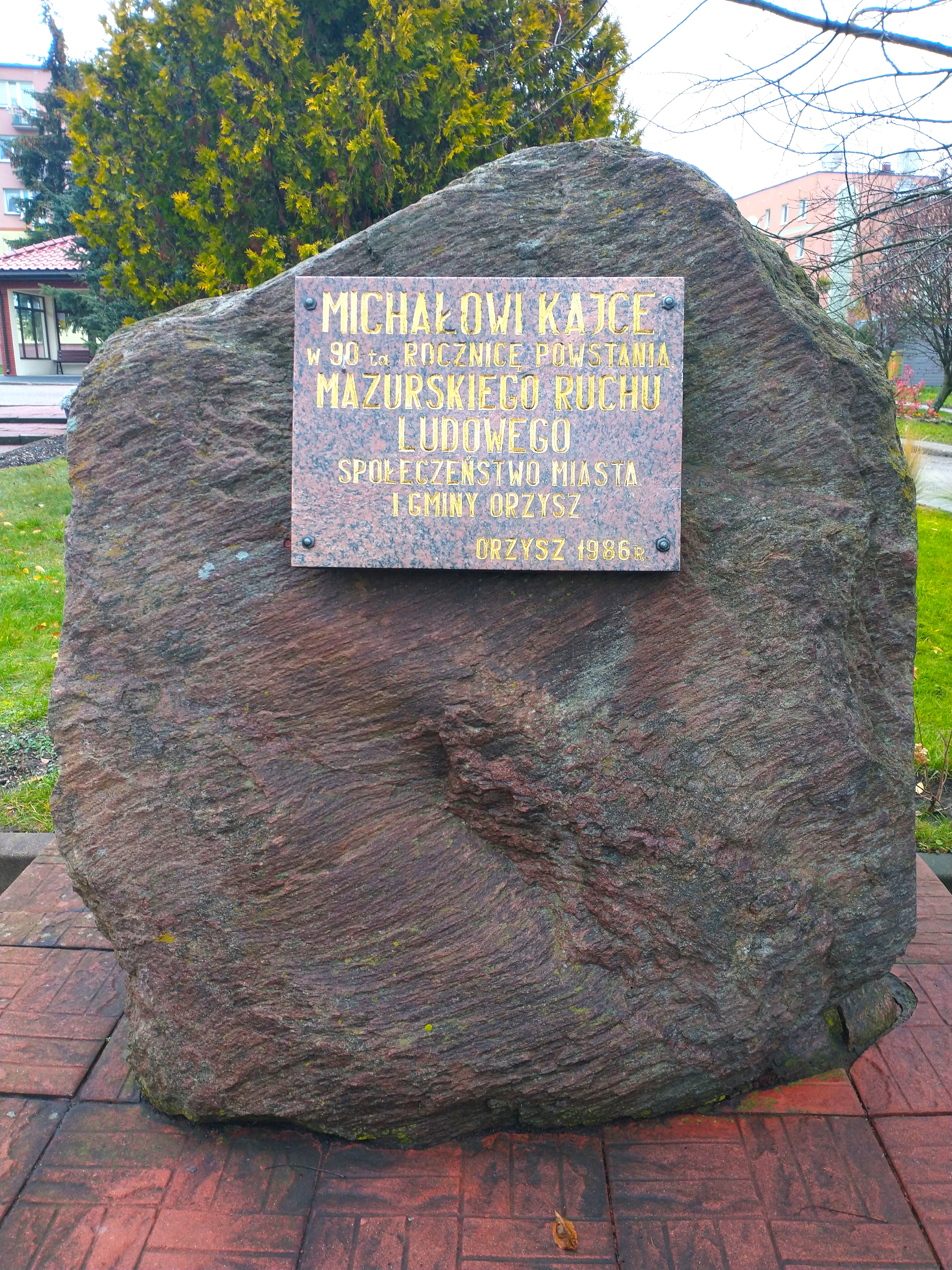
Michał Kajka memorial

In July 1920, a German internment camp for Polish troops was established in the town during the Polish–Soviet War. Some Poles tried to escape and during such attempts three were killed by the Germans, plus three more died in the camp due to epidemics. In August 1920, Poles were deported to Königsberg and then Minden, for Russians to take their place in the camp.

Notable Polish folk poet and activist in Masuria, Michał Kajka, died in the town in 1940.

Towards the end of World War II Arys was nearly destroyed in the Soviet January offensive. After the flight of the majority of the population, there were only 300 people remaining in the town in January 1945, mostly Masurians (Poles). Orzysz became part of Poland under the border changes promulgated at the Potsdam Conference in July–August 1945, the remaining inhabitants were joined by Poles displaced from former eastern Poland annexed by the Soviet Union and from other places.

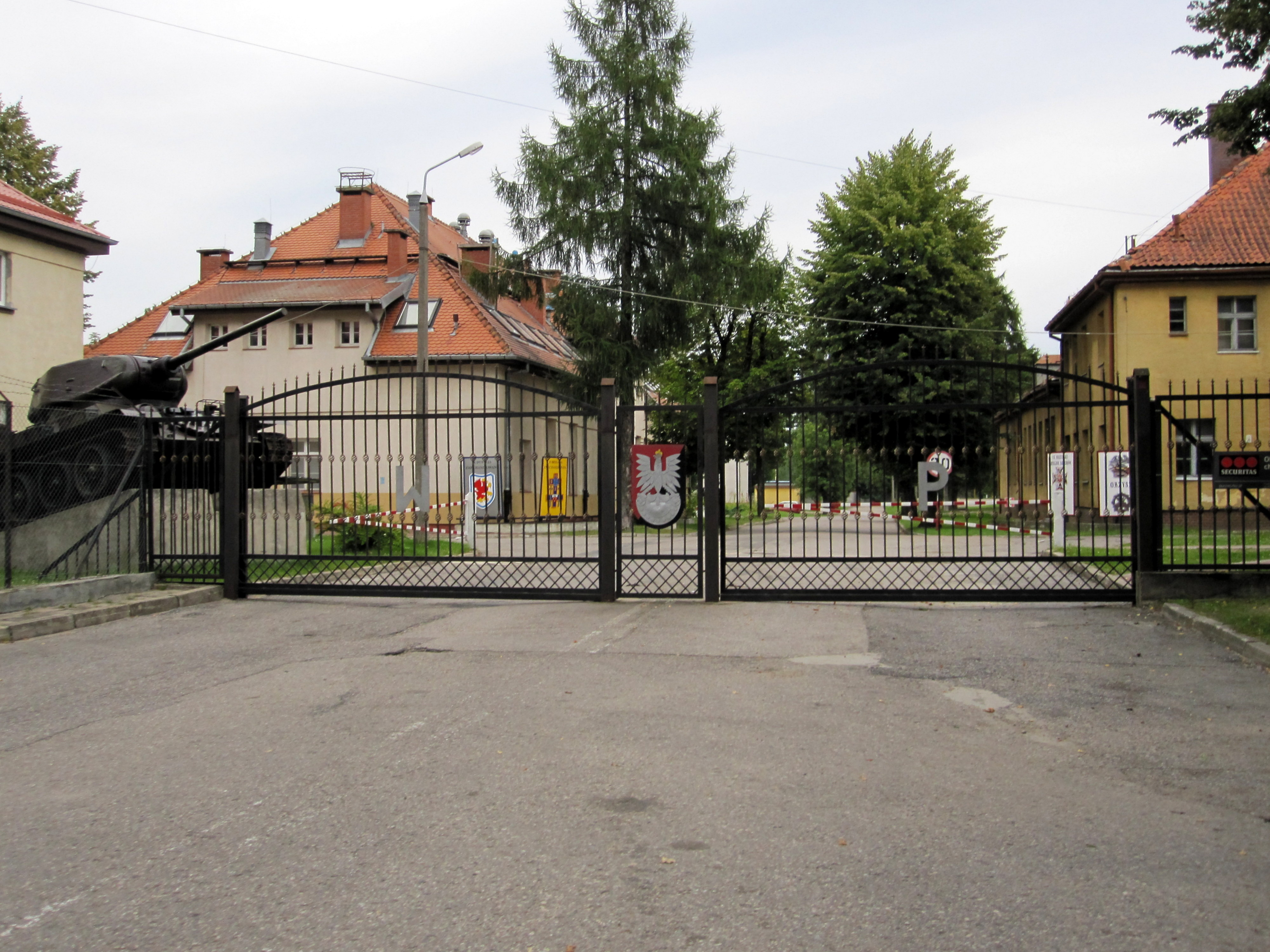
Entrance gate to the barracks of the Polish Armed Forces (2012)

== Transport ==
Orzysz is located at the crossroads of Polish national roads 16 and 63.

== Sports ==
The local football team is Śniardwy Orzysz. It competes in the lower leagues.

== Notable residents ==
- Kurt Sanderling (1912–2011), German conductor
- Wolfgang Heyda (1913–1947), German U-boat commander
- Mariusz Patyra (born 1977) Polish violinist
