= Mikołajki =

Town in Warmian-Masurian Voivodeship, Poland

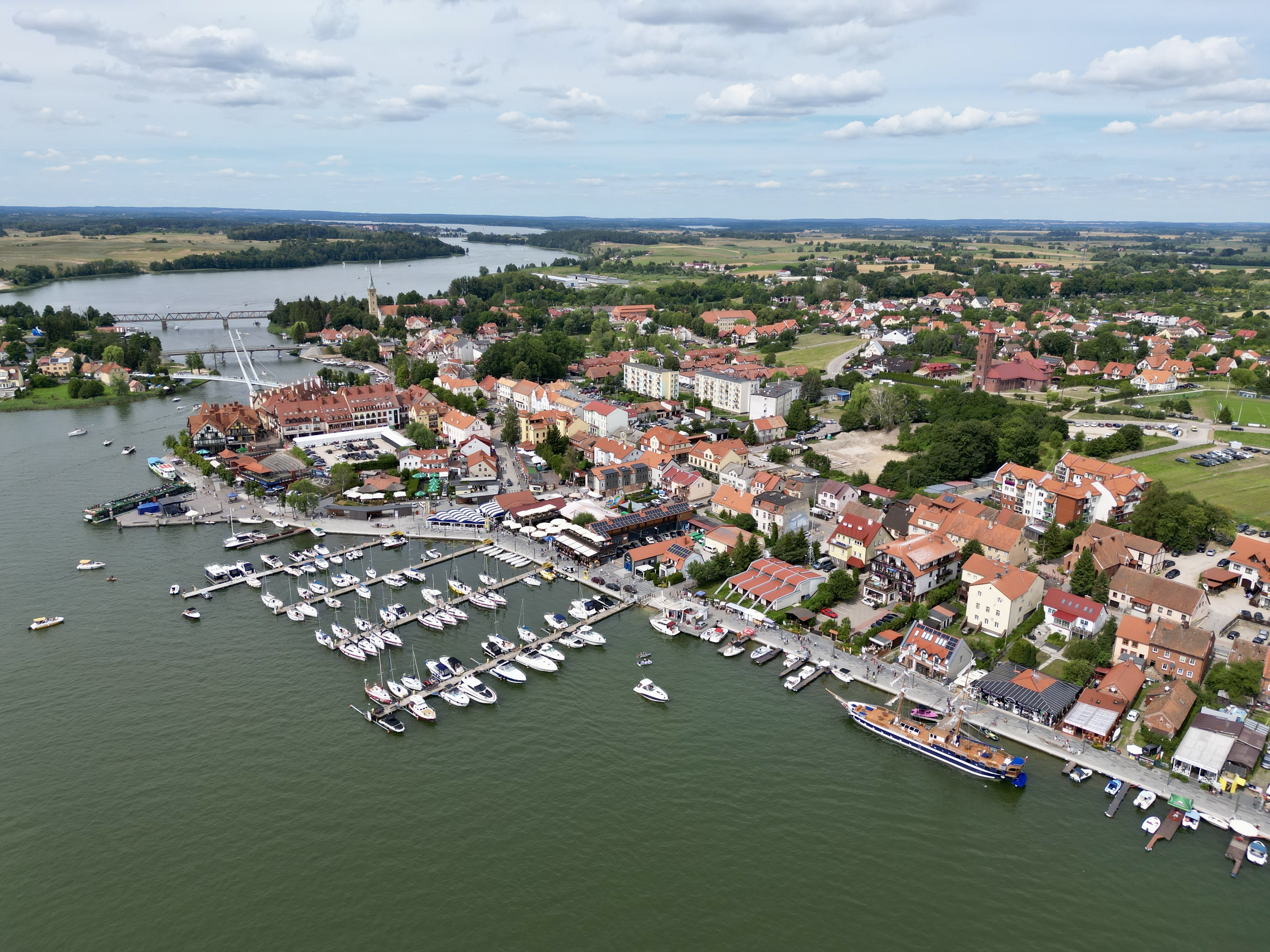
- Aerial view of Mikołajki

- Flag Coat of arms

- Location within Poland
- Coordinates: 53°48′N 21°35′E
- Country: Poland
- Voivodeship: Warmian-Masurian
- County: Mrągowo
- Gmina: Mikołajki
- Established: 15th century
- Town rights: 1726

Government
  - Mayor: Piotr Jakubowski

Area
  - Total: 9.32 km^{2} (3.60 sq mi)
- Highest elevation: 150 m (490 ft)
- Lowest elevation: 116 m (381 ft)

Population (2025)
  - Total: 3,338
  - Density: 358/km^{2} (928/sq mi)
- Time zone: UTC+1 (CET)
  - Summer (DST): UTC+2 (CEST)
- Postal code: 11-730
- Area code: +48 87
- Car plates: NMR
- Website: http://www.mikolajki.pl

Mikołajki [mʲikɔˈwai̯kʲi] (German: Nikolaiken) is a resort town in Mrągowo County, Warmian-Masurian Voivodeship in north-eastern Poland, with 3,338 inhabitants as of 2025. The town is located near the Śniardwy, the largest lake of both the Masurian Lake District and Poland. It is located in the center of the ethnocultural region of Masuria.

== History ==
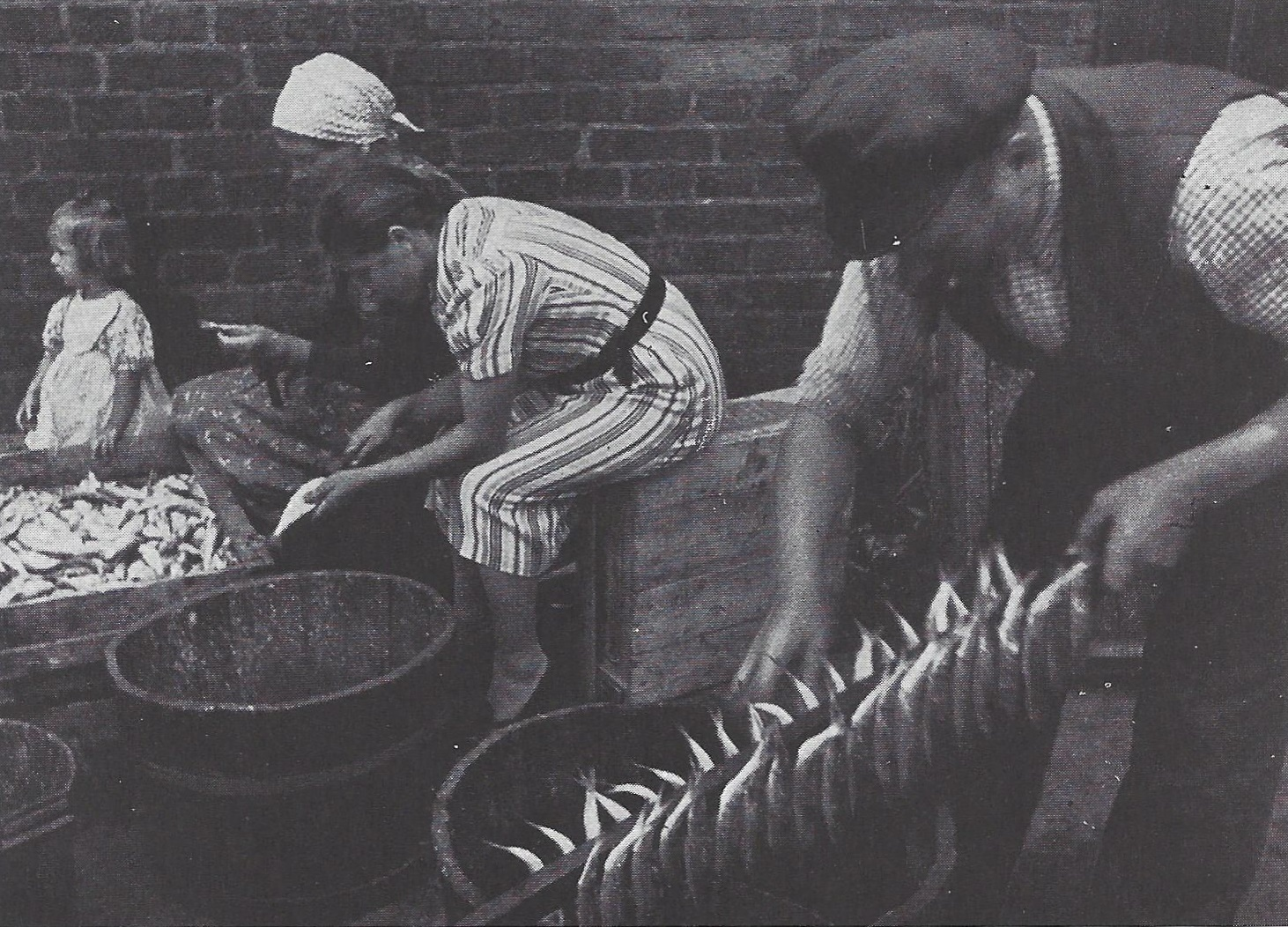
Preparing whitefish in the 1920s

Mikołajki is an old Masurian church town first documented as Nickelsdorf (Sankt Niklas) in 1444 and Niklasdorf in 1493. The name refers to Saint Nicholas (Mikołaj in Polish). Early on, it was part of the State of the Teutonic Order. In 1454 Polish King Casimir IV Jagiellon incorporated the region to the Kingdom of Poland upon the request of the anti-Teutonic Prussian Confederation, and the Thirteen Years' War broke out. After the war ended in 1466, the Teutonic Order regained authority over the town as a fief of the Polish Crown. From 1525 on, it was part of the Duchy of Prussia, founded as a vassal state of Poland. Similar to all of Masuria, it was mainly inhabited by Poles, hailing from nearby Masovia. In 1539 the inhabitants of the settlement were almost entirely Poles, who called it by its Polish name Mikołajki. First Protestant pastors were mentioned in 1552. The settlement, now within the Kingdom of Prussia, grew during the 18th century, receiving its town privileges as Nikolaiken in 1726. Because of its location on Śniardwy, the fishery of Nikolaiken ensured continued prosperity; the whitefish of the region were especially popular throughout the province of East Prussia.

From 1871 it was part of the German Empire, located within the Sensburg district (Landkreis Sensburg) within the province of East Prussia. However, in 1877, the population was still predominantly Polish, mostly of Protestant confession. In the 1898 German federal election, the Polish candidate of the Masurian People's Party, Zenon Eugeniusz Lewandowski, who originated from Poznań and was supported by the German Free-minded People's Party, received 50% of votes in Mikolajki. As a result of the treaty of Versailles the 1920 East Prussian plebiscite was organized on 11 July 1920 under the control of the League of Nations, which resulted in 1,800 votes to remain in Germany and none for Poland. During World War II it was one of the few Masurian towns not destroyed from the fighting, following the war it became part of Poland under its historic Polish name Mikołajki. The German-speaking population was evacuated and expelled by Polish and Soviet soldiers in accordance to the Potsdam Agreement.

The town was a growing tourist center before the war and is now one of the largest tourist sites in Masuria. The ice sailing in winter is an especially popular tourist attraction. The town's location on attractive lakes has also created the sailing capital of Poland here.

== Climate ==
Mikołajki has an oceanic climate (Köppen climate classification: Cfb) using the −3 °C (27 °F) isotherm or a humid continental climate (Köppen climate classification: Dfb) using the 0 °C (32 °F) isotherm.

Climate data for Mikołajki (1991–2020 normals, extremes 1952–present)
Month	Jan	Feb	Mar	Apr	May	Jun	Jul	Aug	Sep	Oct	Nov	Dec	Year
Record high °C (°F)	11.9 (53.4)	15.9 (60.6)	22.1 (71.8)	30.0 (86.0)	31.1 (88.0)	32.8 (91.0)	34.9 (94.8)	34.4 (93.9)	33.9 (93.0)	24.2 (75.6)	16.6 (61.9)	12.5 (54.5)	34.9 (94.8)
Mean daily maximum °C (°F)	−0.1 (31.8)	1.2 (34.2)	5.8 (42.4)	12.9 (55.2)	18.4 (65.1)	21.6 (70.9)	23.8 (74.8)	23.3 (73.9)	18.1 (64.6)	11.7 (53.1)	5.6 (42.1)	1.4 (34.5)	12.0 (53.6)
Daily mean °C (°F)	−2.4 (27.7)	−1.6 (29.1)	1.8 (35.2)	7.8 (46.0)	13.0 (55.4)	16.5 (61.7)	18.8 (65.8)	18.3 (64.9)	13.7 (56.7)	8.2 (46.8)	3.5 (38.3)	−0.6 (30.9)	8.1 (46.6)
Mean daily minimum °C (°F)	−4.7 (23.5)	−4.3 (24.3)	−1.6 (29.1)	3.2 (37.8)	8.2 (46.8)	12.1 (53.8)	14.4 (57.9)	14.0 (57.2)	10.0 (50.0)	5.4 (41.7)	1.5 (34.7)	−2.6 (27.3)	4.6 (40.3)
Record low °C (°F)	−31.6 (−24.9)	−30.9 (−23.6)	−25.9 (−14.6)	−9.1 (15.6)	−3.3 (26.1)	2.3 (36.1)	6.5 (43.7)	5.2 (41.4)	−0.6 (30.9)	−9.8 (14.4)	−18.2 (−0.8)	−25.2 (−13.4)	−31.6 (−24.9)
Average precipitation mm (inches)	33.5 (1.32)	29.6 (1.17)	35.2 (1.39)	36.2 (1.43)	59.3 (2.33)	72.8 (2.87)	81.9 (3.22)	79.8 (3.14)	53.6 (2.11)	54.7 (2.15)	41.3 (1.63)	36.4 (1.43)	614.2 (24.18)
Average extreme snow depth cm (inches)	9.1 (3.6)	10.1 (4.0)	6.6 (2.6)	1.9 (0.7)	0.1 (0.0)	0.0 (0.0)	0.0 (0.0)	0.0 (0.0)	0.0 (0.0)	0.6 (0.2)	2.6 (1.0)	6.1 (2.4)	10.1 (4.0)
Average precipitation days (≥ 0.1 mm)	16.83	15.10	13.59	11.69	13.14	14.36	14.32	12.71	12.71	13.68	15.57	16.39	170.10
Average snowy days (≥ 0 cm)	18.6	17.3	8.9	1.2	0.0	0.0	0.0	0.0	0.0	0.4	3.6	12.7	62.7
Average relative humidity (%)	89.4	86.5	79.6	71.8	71.8	73.3	75.3	75.7	80.9	85.3	90.6	90.3	80.8
Mean monthly sunshine hours	39.2	63.3	126.5	197.8	256.7	254.5	264.3	247.3	168.2	105.7	37.9	28.4	1,789.8
Source 1: Institute of Meteorology and Water Management
Source 2: Meteomodel.pl (records, relative humidity 1991–2020)

== Sports ==
Since 2005, the Rally of Poland has been based in Mikołajki.

The local football team is Kłobuk Mikołajki. It competes in the lower leagues.

== Gallery ==
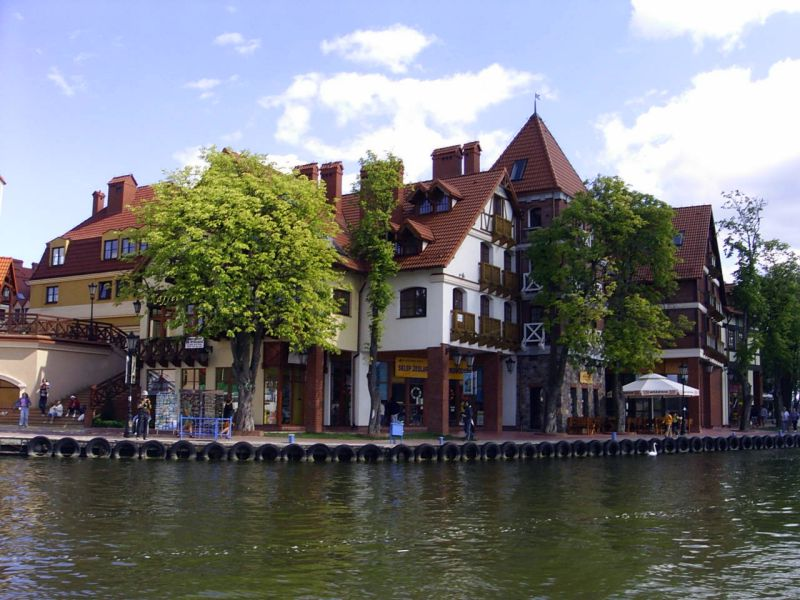
The view of Mikołajki from Mikołajskie Lake (Jezioro Mikołajskie)

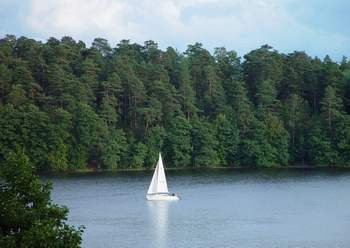
The view of Mikołajskie Lake (Jezioro Mikołajskie)

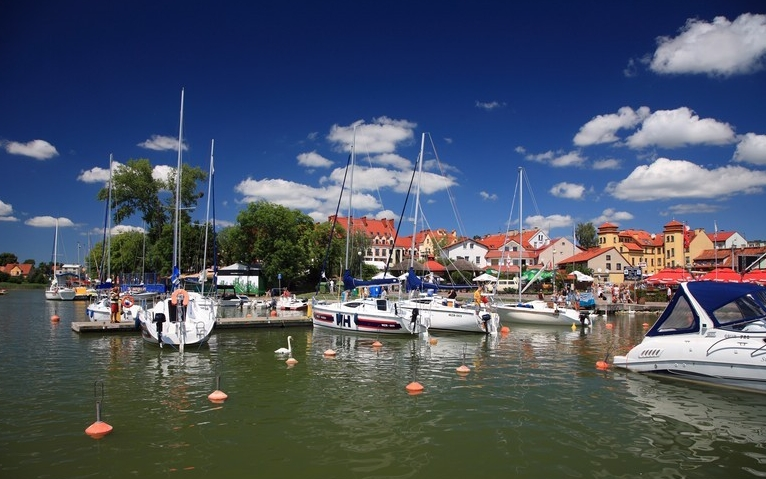
The view of Mikołajki from the marina.

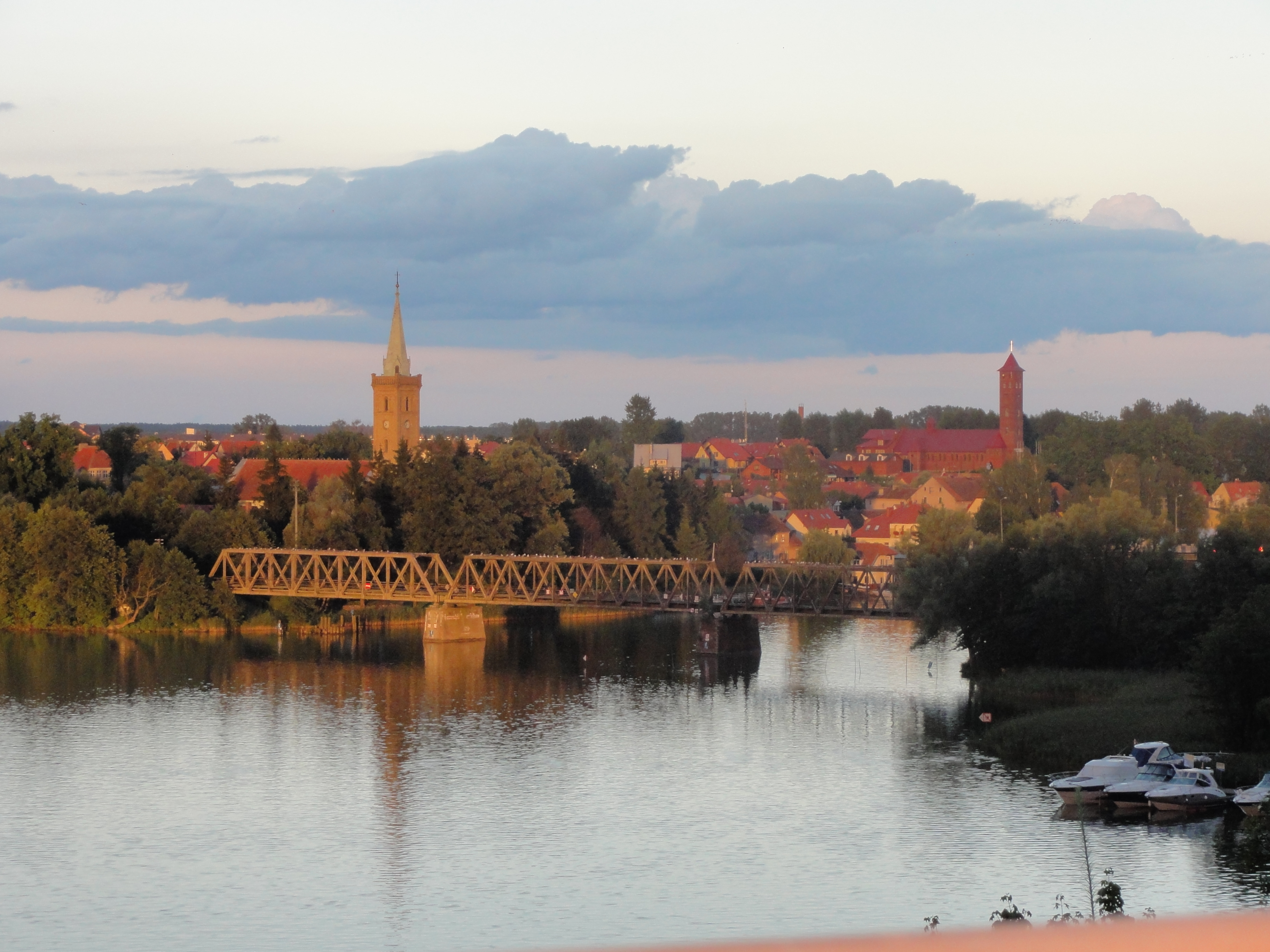
Skyline of Mikołajki

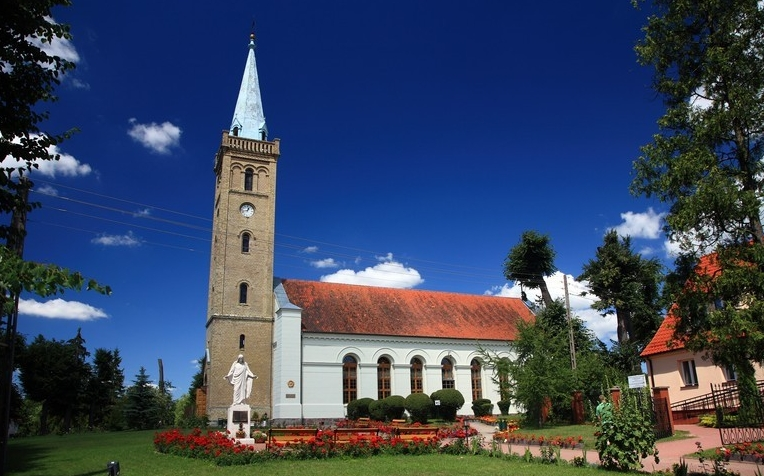
Lutheran Holy Trinity church

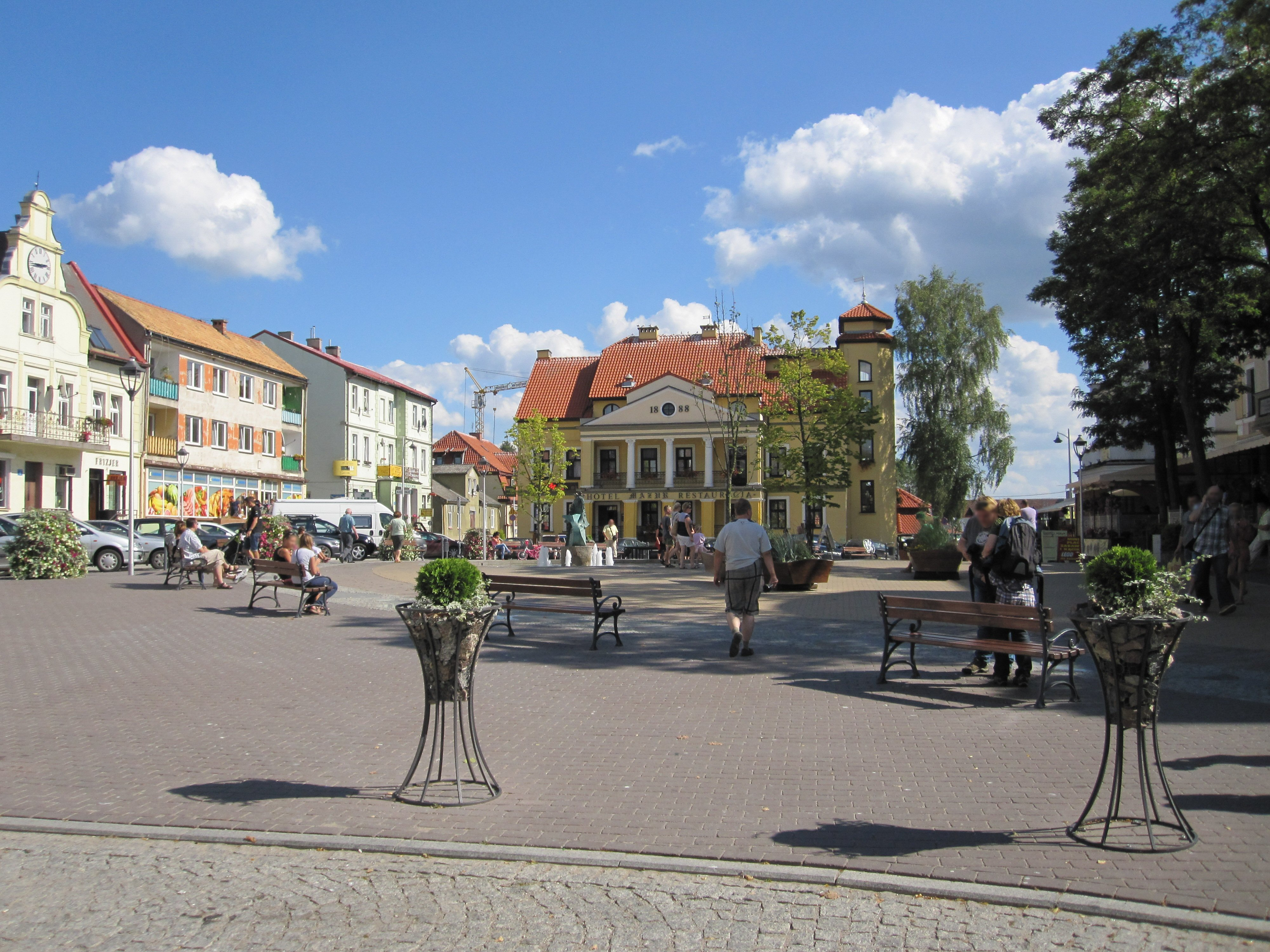
Freedom Square (Plac Wolności)

== International relations ==
=== Twin towns — Sister cities ===
Mikołajki is twinned with:

- Villard-de-Lans, France
- Varėna, Lithuania
