= Wierzbiny, Warmian-Masurian Voivodeship =

Wierzbiny
- Village
- Location within Poland
- Coordinates: 53°48′N 21°59′E
- Country: Poland
- Voivodeship: Warmian-Masurian
- County: Pisz
- Gmina: Orzysz

Wierzbiny [vjɛʐˈbinɨ] is a village in the administrative district of Gmina Orzysz, within Pisz County, Warmian-Masurian Voivodeship, in northern Poland.
