= Gmina Orzysz =

Gmina Orzysz Orzysz Commune
- Gmina
- Flag Coat of arms
- Interactive map of Gmina Orzysz
- Coordinates (Orzysz): 53°48′20″N 21°56′45″E
- Country: Poland
- Voivodeship: Warmian-Masurian
- County: Pisz
- Seat: Orzysz

Area
  - Total: 363.49 km^{2} (140.34 sq mi)

Population (2006)
  - Total: 9,567
  - Density: 26.32/km^{2} (68.17/sq mi)
  - Urban: 5,804
  - Rural: 3,763
- Website: https://www.orzysz.pl/

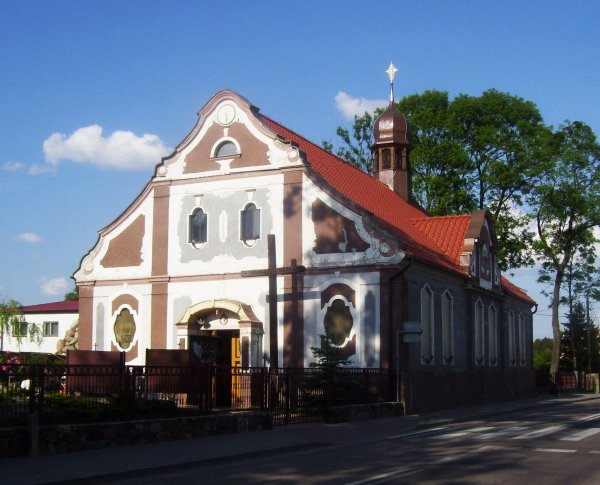
Maly Kosciol Orzysz

Gmina Orzysz is an urban-rural gmina (administrative district) in Pisz County, Warmian-Masurian Voivodeship, in northern Poland. Its seat is the town of Orzysz, which lies approximately 24 kilometres (15 mi) north-east of Pisz and 96 km (60 mi) east of the regional capital Olsztyn.

The gmina covers an area of 363.49 square kilometres (140.3 sq mi), and as of 2006 its total population is 9,567 (out of which the population of Orzysz amounts to 5,804, and the population of the rural part of the gmina is 3,763).

The gmina contains part of the protected area called Masurian Landscape Park.

== Villages ==
Apart from the town of Orzysz, Gmina Orzysz contains the villages and settlements of Aleksandrowo, Chmielewo, Cierzpięty, Czarne, Dąbrówka, Drozdowo, Dziubiele, Dziubiele Małe, Gaudynki, Golec, Góra, Górki, Gorzekały, Grądy, Grądy Podmiejskie, Grzegorze, Kamieńskie, Kępa, Klusy, Leśniczówka Koźle, Matyszczyki, Mikosze, Mikosze-Osada, Nowa Wieś, Nowe Guty, Odoje, Ogródek, Okartowo, Okartowo-Przystanek, Okartowo-Tartak, Osiki, Pianki, Rostki Skomackie, Rzęśniki-Leśniczówka, Stefanowo, Strzelniki, Suchy Róg, Sumki, Szwejkówko, Tuchlin, Tuchlin-Gajówka, Ublik, Wężewo, Wierzbiny, Zastrużne and Zdęgówko.

== Neighbouring gminas ==
Gmina Orzysz is bordered by the gminas of Biała Piska, Ełk, Mikołajki, Miłki, Pisz, Stare Juchy and Wydminy.
