= Félix Chopin =

- Born: 1813; Paris, France
- Died: 1892 (aged 78–79)
- Occupation: Bronze designer

Félix Chopin (1813-1892) was a French bronze designer.

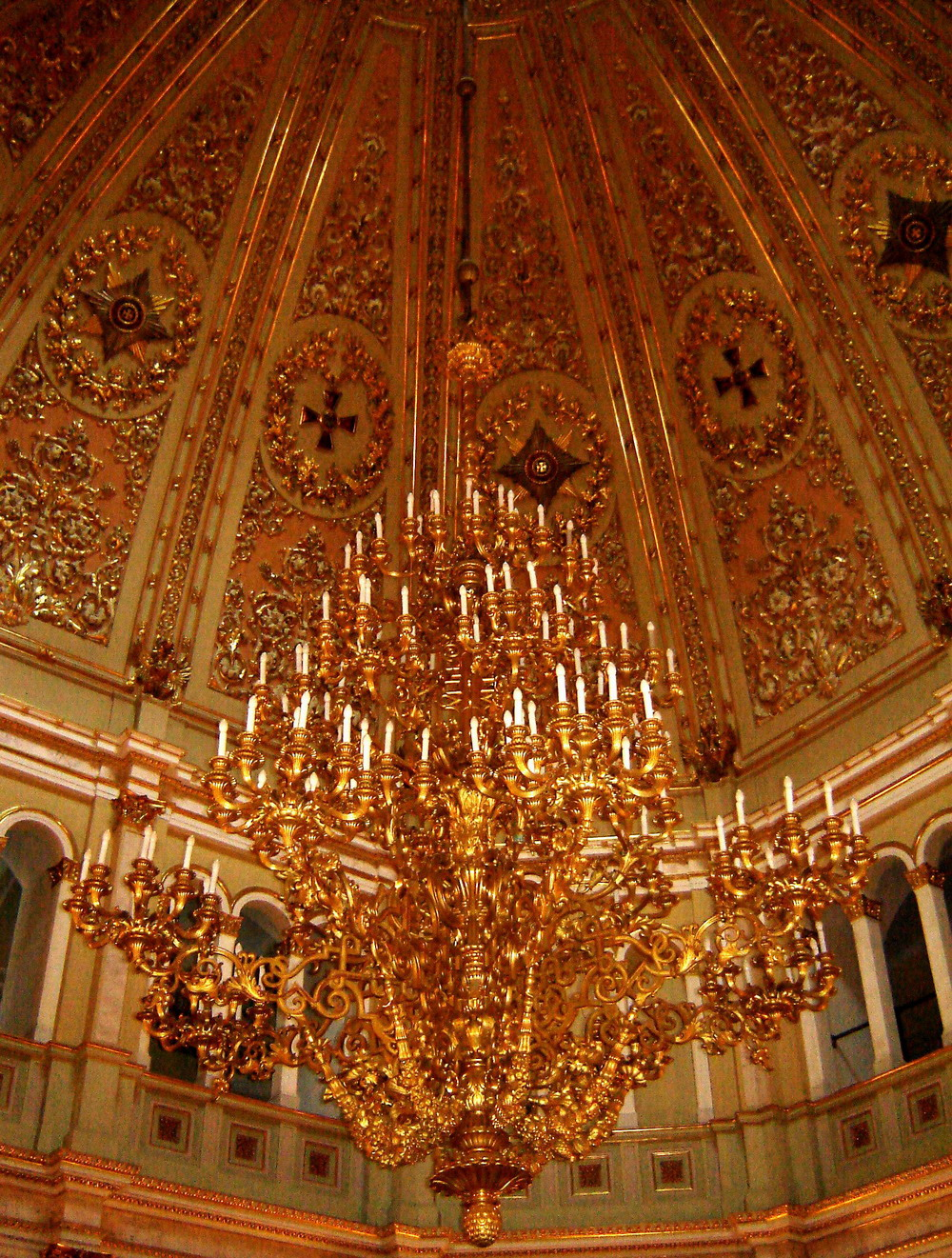
Chandelier designed by Chopin in Vladimir Hall, Grand Kremlin Palace.

== Early life ==
Félix Chopin was born in 1813 in Paris, France.

== Career ==
Chopin moved to Saint Petersburg in 1838. He designed a chandelier in Vladimir Hall, in the Grand Kremlin Palace, in Moscow. He also designed a chandelier in the Peterhof Palace.

Chopin designed several artpieces with Eugene Lanceray. For example, they designed a sculpture of a horse, which is now in the Museum of Fine Arts, Boston.

== Death ==
He died in 1892.
