= Statue of Frédéric Chopin (Paris) =

Sculpture in Paris, France

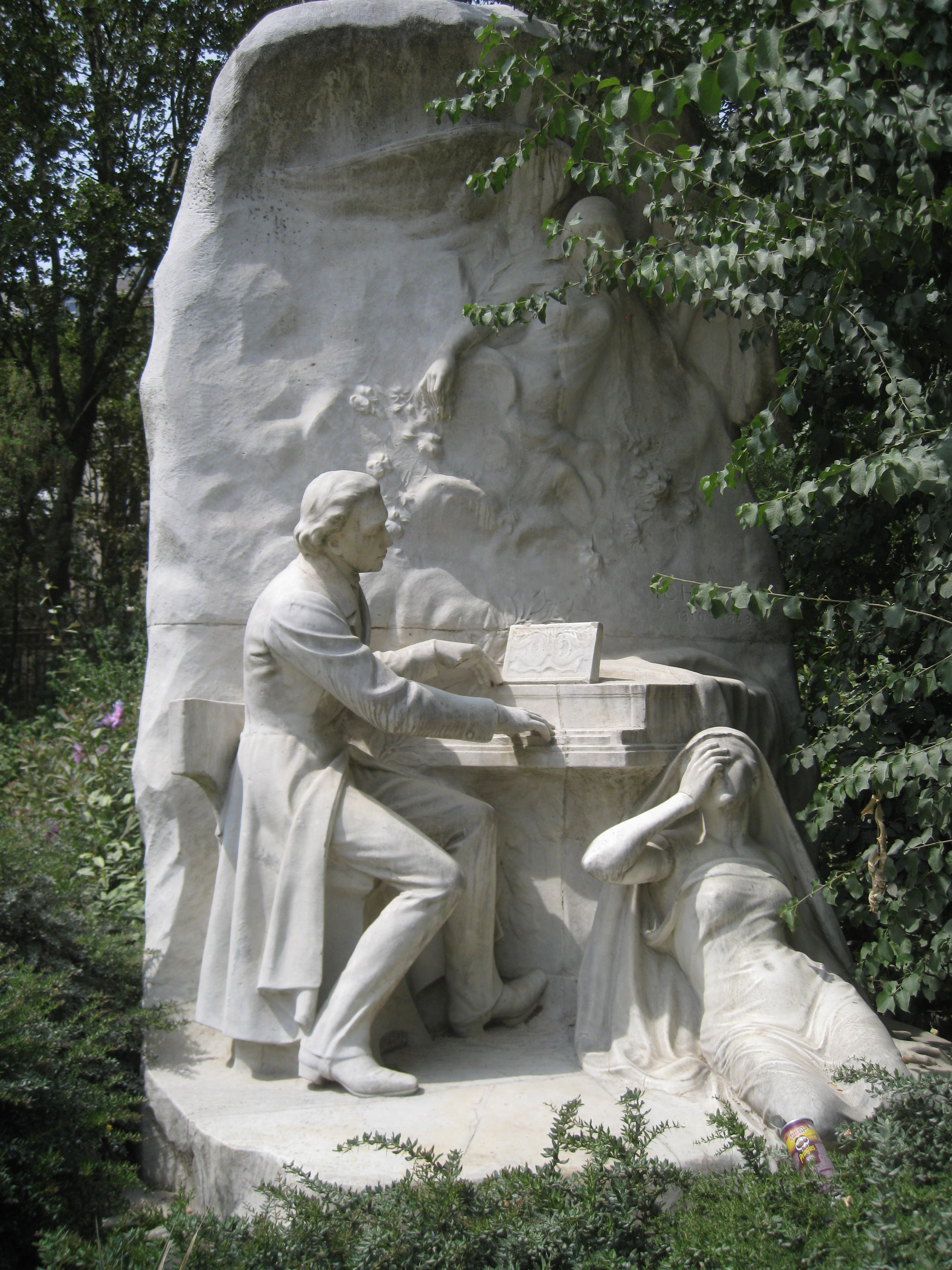
- The sculpture in 2018.
- Interactive map of Statue of Frédéric Chopin
- Location: Monceau Park, 8th arrondissement, Paris, France
- Coordinates: 48°52′45.293″N 02°18′22.439″E
- Designer: Jacques Froment-Meurice
- Type: Statue
- Material: Marble
- Opening date: October 1906
- Dedicated to: Frédéric Chopin

The statue of Frédéric Chopin (French: statue de Frédéric Chopin) is a marble sculpture in the 8th arrondissement of Paris, France, located in the Monceau Park, near the corner of Courcelles Boulevard and Alfred de Vigny Street. It is dedicated to Frédéric Chopin, a 19th-century composer and virtuoso pianist of the Romantic period. The monument was designed by Jacques Froment-Meurice and unveiled in 1906.

== History ==
The monument was sculpted by Jacques Froment-Meurice, and unveiled in October 1906, in the Monceau Park in Paris.

== Overview ==
The monument is placed in the Monceau Park, near the corner of Courcelles Boulevard and Alfred de Vigny Street. It consists of a marble statue of Frédéric Chopin, playing on the piano, at whose feet lies the figure of a woman covering her eyes. Above the piano is the figure of a winged woman in the clouds, throwing flowers. The monument bears the inscription: "A. Chopin".
