= Odoje =

- Village
- Location within Poland
- Coordinates: 53°46′27″N 21°51′17″E
- Country: Poland
- Voivodeship: Warmian-Masurian
- County: Pisz
- Gmina: Orzysz

Odoje [ɔˈdɔjɛ] is a village in the administrative district of Gmina Orzysz, within Pisz County, Warmian-Masurian Voivodeship, in northern Poland.
