= Nowe Guty =

- Village
- Location within Poland
- Coordinates: 53°46′23″N 21°51′12″E
- Country: Poland
- Voivodeship: Warmian-Masurian
- County: Pisz
- Gmina: Orzysz
- Website: http://www.noweguty.pl

Nowe Guty [ˈnɔvɛ ˈɡutɨ] (German : Gutten) is a village in the administrative district of Gmina Orzysz, within Pisz County, Warmian-Masurian Voivodeship, in northern Poland.

New Guty is one of the oldest villages in the area - archaeologists have discovered traces of an early Prussian settlement, but it has not been explored to date.

Monuments included in the municipal register of monuments:

- Dutch-type windmill built at the beginning of the 20th century,
- former Evangelical cemetery, established in the mid-19th century.
