= Chopin Plaza =

Coordinates: 41°54′13″N 87°40′02″W

Chopin Plaza (Polish: Plac Chopina) is a small plaza in Chicago's Gladstone Park neighborhood at the intersection of Milwaukee, Elston and Melvina avenues. Unofficially named in honor of Frederic Chopin by 41st Ward Alderman Roman Pucinski after the composer in recognition of Northwest Chicago's sizable Polish population, it received this official designation in June 2014 thanks to Alderman Margaret Laurino.
