= Frédéric Chopin Memorial (Paris) =

Sculpture in Paris, France

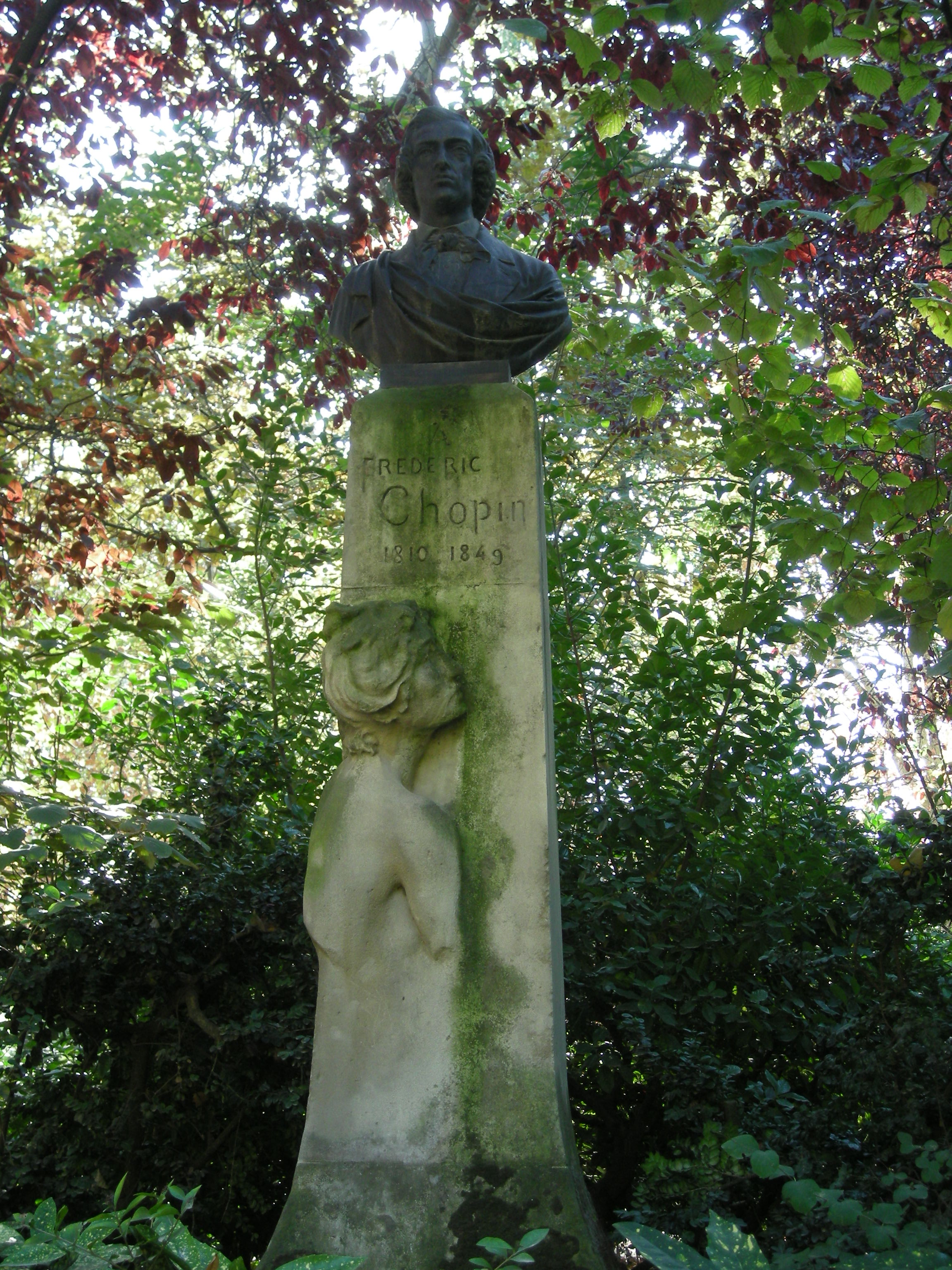
- The monument in 2011.
- Interactive map of Frédéric Chopin Memorial
- Location: Luxembourg Garden, 8th arrondissement, Paris, France
- Coordinates: 48°50′50.50″N 02°20′01.14″E
- Designer: Georges Dubois (original); Bolesław Syrewicz (replica)
- Type: Bust
- Material: Bronze (bust); granite (pedestal)
- Opening date: 1901 (original); 1999 (replica)
- Dedicated to: Frédéric Chopin

The Frédéric Chopin Memorial (French: monument de Frédéric Chopin) is a monument in the 8th arrondissement of Paris, France, located in the Luxembourg Garden, near Guynemer Street. It is dedicated to Frédéric Chopin, a 19th-century composer and virtuoso pianist of the Romantic period. The monument has a form of a bronze bust placed on a granite pedestal, with a relief of a women's profile. It was designed by Georges Dubois and unveiled in 1901. The bust disappeared in the 1940s, during the German occupation of Paris in the Second World War, and its replica, designed by Bolesław Syrewicz, was unveiled in 1999.

== History ==
The monument was dedicated by Georges Dubois and unveiledin 1901, in the Luxembourg Garden in Paris. It was financed by musicians Jules Massenet and F. Henry Peru.

The bust of Chopin disappeared in the 1940s during the German occupation of Paris in the Second World War. Its replica, designed by Bolesław Syrewicz, was unveiled in 1999.

== Overview ==
The monument consists of a bronze bust of Frédéric Chopin, placed on a granite pedestal, with a relief of a women's profile. It has an inscription which reads "A Frédéric Chopin 1810–1849".

== Gallery ==
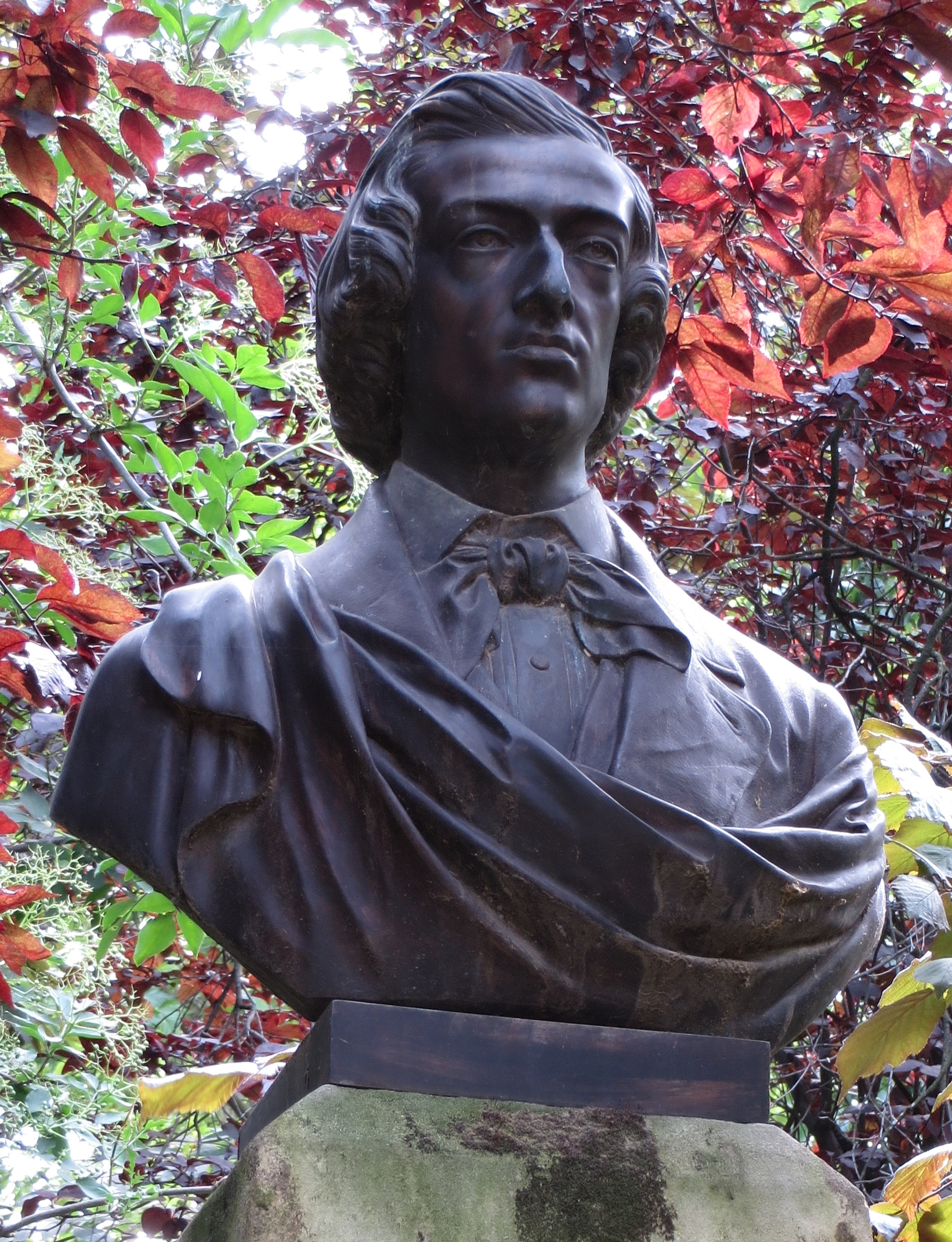
The bust of Frédéric Chopin.
