= Strzelniki, Warmian-Masurian Voivodeship =

Strzelniki
- Village
- Location within Poland
- Coordinates: 53°48′N 22°2′E
- Country: Poland
- Voivodeship: Warmian-Masurian
- County: Pisz
- Gmina: Orzysz

Strzelniki [stʂɛlˈniki] (German: Schützenau) is a village in the administrative district of Gmina Orzysz, within Pisz County, Warmian-Masurian Voivodeship, in northern Poland.
