= Wierzba, Warmian-Masurian Voivodeship =

Wierzba
- Village
- Location within Poland
- Coordinates: 53°46′N 21°37′E
- Country: Poland
- Voivodeship: Warmian-Masurian
- County: Pisz
- Gmina: Ruciane-Nida

Wierzba [ˈvjɛʐba] (German: Wiersba (1938–45: Beldahnsee)) is a village in the administrative district of Gmina Ruciane-Nida, within Pisz County, Warmian-Masurian Voivodeship, in northern Poland.
