= Jean-Marie Chopin =

French-Russian explorer

Jean-Marie Chopin (Russian: Иван Шопен; born in 1796 in Saint Petersburg; died 15 February 1871 in Paris) was a French-Russian explorer of the Caucasus. Son of a French sculptor and employed by Catherine II of Russia, Chopin began his career as secretary and librarian to Prince Alexander Kurakin, Russian ambassador to France for 12 years. In 1812 Chopin and Kourakin returned to Russia; after the death of his patron in 1818 Chopin settled in Paris.

Chopin wrote "l'Histoire de Russie", "des Révolutions des Peuples du Nord", "Histoire des Provinces Danubiennes","Histoire du Dannemark", "Histoire du Roi de Rome". Chopin is known for his 1826 translation of The Fountain of Bakhchisaray by Alexander Pushkin (La Fontaine des Pleurs in French). The book was illustrated by his brother; the music for "Tartar sing" by the translator's wife was printed on the supplementary sheet. In Russia, this is the rarest publication of the Poushkine's work published when he was alive.
