= Statue of Frédéric Chopin (Havana) =

Sculpture in Havana, Cuba

- Interactive map of Statue of Frédéric Chopin
- Location: St. Francis Square, Havana, Cuba
- Coordinates: 23.1377°N 82.3488°W
- Designer: Adam Myjak
- Type: Statue
- Opening date: 11 December 2010
- Dedicated to: Frédéric Chopin

The statue of Frédéric Chopin (Spanish: Estatua de Frédéric Chopin; Polish: Pomnik Fryderyka Chopina) is a statue in Havana, Cuba, placed at the St. Francis Square. It consists of a statue of Frédéric Chopin, a 19th-century composer and virtuoso pianist of the Romantic period, depicted sitting on a bench. It was designed by Adam Myjak and unveiled on 11 December 2010.

== History ==
The sculpture was designed by Adam Myjak and unveiled on 11 December 2010, at the St. Francis Square, as part of the celebrations of the Chopin Year.

== Design ==
A sculpture consists of a statue of Frédéric Chopin, a 19th-century composer and virtuoso pianist of the Romantic period, depicted sitting on a bench.
