= Frédéric Chopin Memorial (Shanghai) =

Sculpture in Shanghai, China

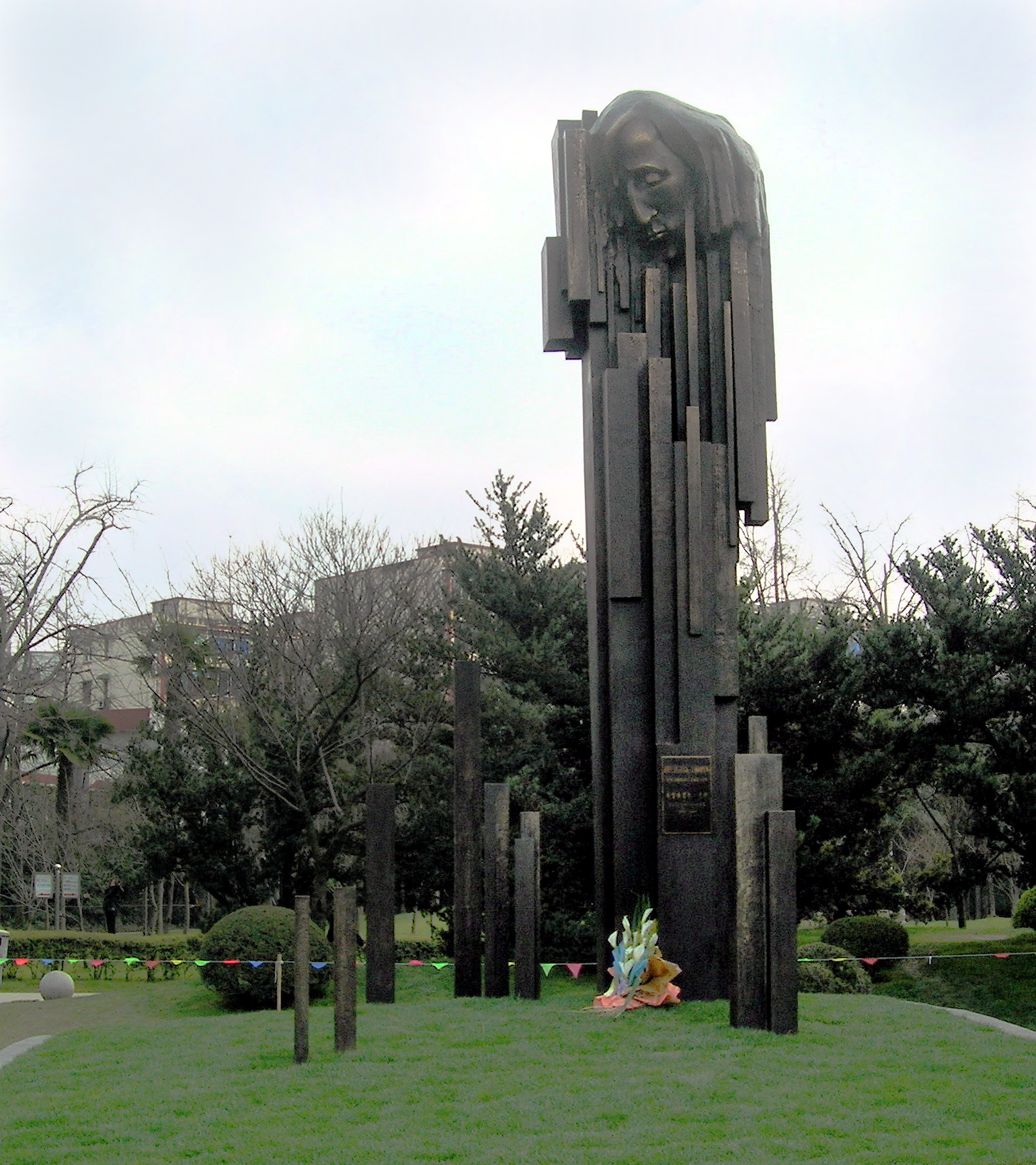
- The sculpture in 2007.
- Interactive map of Frédéric Chopin Memorial
- Location: Zhongshan Park, Changning, Shanghai, China
- Coordinates: 31°13′19″N 121°25′10″E
- Designer: Lu Pin
- Type: Sculpture
- Material: Bronze
- Height: 6 m (20 ft)
- Opening date: 3 March 2007
- Dedicated to: Frédéric Chopin

The Frédéric Chopin Memorial (Note: simplified Chinese: 弗雷德里克·萧邦纪念碑纪念碑; traditional Chinese: 弗雷德里克·肖邦紀念碑紀念碑; pinyin: Fúléidélǐkè Xiāobāng jìniànbēi; Polish: Pomnik Fryderyka Chopina) is a bronze sculpture in Shanghai, China, in the Zhongshan Park, within the Changning district. It is dedicated to Frédéric Chopin, a 19th-century composer and virtuoso pianist of the Romantic period. It was designed by Lu Pin, and unveiled on 3 March 2007.

== History ==
The monument was proposed by Marek Niewiarowski, the secretary general of the International Federation of Chopin Societies, and a Chinese-Polish businesswoman Yu Jian Er. The sculpture was designed by artist Lu Pin, and manufactured in Gliwice, Poland. It was unveiled on 3 March 2007. The ceremony was attended by Krzysztof Olendzki, the Deputy Minister of Culture and National Heritage of Poland, and Wojciech Olejniczak, the Deputy Marshal of the Sejm of Poland. During the unveiling, Lu Pin was awarded the Gloria Artis Bronze Medal for Merit to Culture. It was the second monument in Shanghai dedicated to a foreigner.

== Overview ==
The monument is a bronze structure, measuring 6 metres, and placed on a 1-metre-tall elevation. It has a form of numerous extruding thin and long vertical rectangular cuboids. At the top, if has a large sculpture of the face of Frédéric Chopin. Around it are placed several smaller thin and long vertical rectangular cuboids.
