= Śniardwy =

Lake in Poland

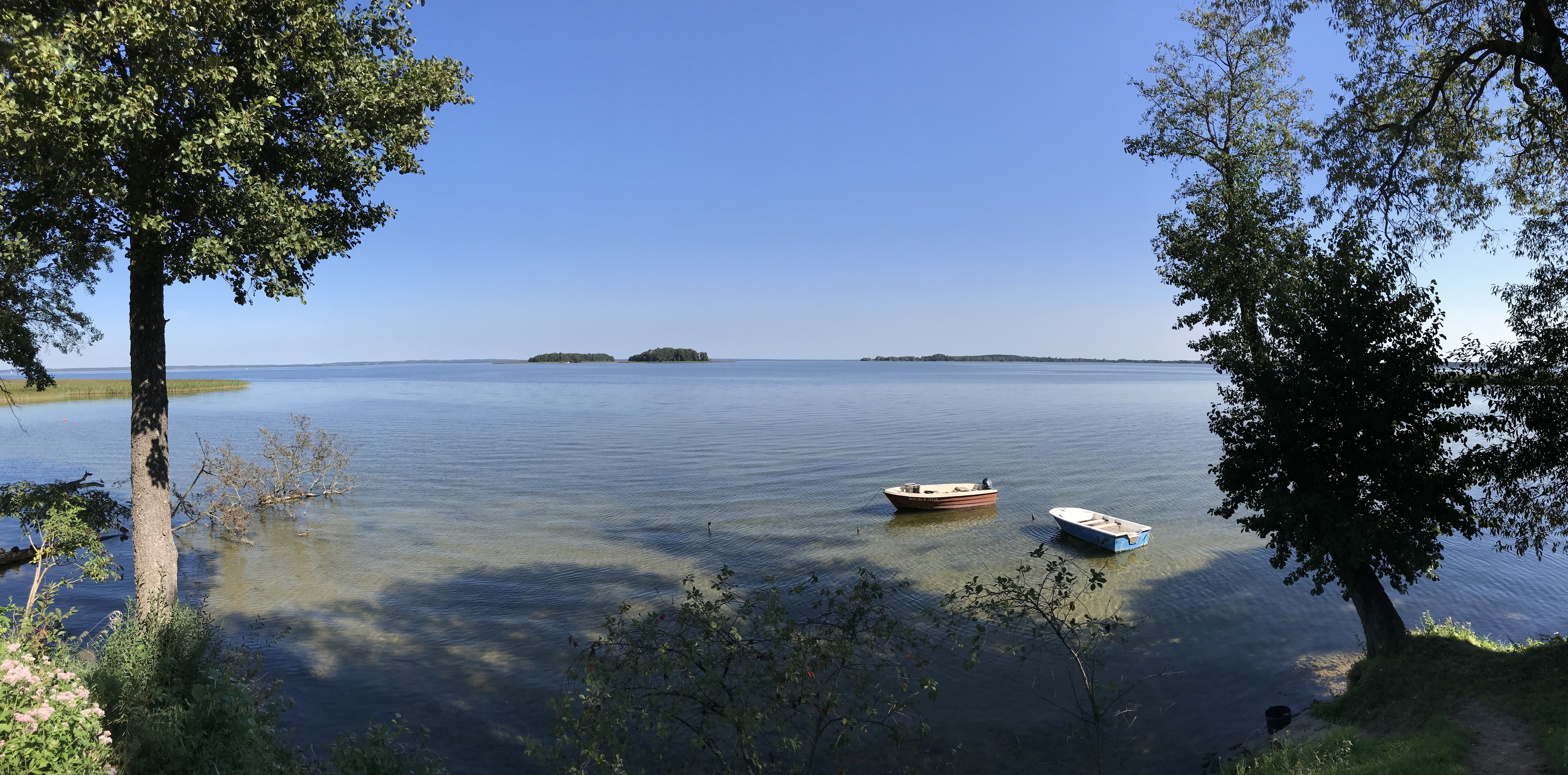
- Śniardwy in Niedźwiedzi Róg

- Location within Warmian-Masurian Voivodeship Location within Poland
- Location: Masurian Lake District
- Coordinates: 53°46′N 21°45′E
- Type: Glacial lake
- Basin countries: Poland
- Max. length: 22.1 km (13.7 mi)
- Max. width: 13.4 km (8.3 mi)
- Surface area: 113.8 km^{2} (43.9 sq mi)
- Average depth: 6.5 m (21 ft)
- Max. depth: 23 m (75 ft)
- Water volume: 0.65 km^{3} (530,000 acre⋅ft)
- Surface elevation: 117 m (384 ft)
- Islands: 8

Śniardwy (Polish: [ˈɕɲar.dvɘ], German: der Spirdingsee) is a lake in the Masurian Lake District of the Warmian-Masurian Voivodeship, Poland.

At 113.8 square kilometres (43.9 sq mi), Śniardwy is the largest lake in Poland. It was also the largest lake in Prussia and in Germany, when Warmia-Masuria was under German rule and formed the southern part of East Prussia. It is 22.1 kilometres (13.7 mi) long and 13.4 kilometres (8.3 mi) wide. The maximum depth is 23 metres (75 feet). There are eight islands on the Śniardwy lake.

== Geography ==
Śniardwy was formed by retreating ice sheet and draining floodwaters occurring as the result of ice calving ahead of the receding glacier. Among the eight islands are: Szeroki Ostrów, Czarci Ostrów, Wyspa Pajęcza, Wyspa Kaczor and others. Surrounding settlements include Popielno, Głodowo, Niedźwiedzi Róg, Okartowo, Nowe Guty, Zdęgowo and Łuknajno.

Among the many inlets, two are named as separate lakes: Warnołty and Seksty. Śniardwy connects with the following lakes: Tuchlin, Łuknajno, Mikołajskie, Roś, Białoławki and Tyrkło. It is surrounded by the system of canals known as Kanały Mazurskie (Masurian Canals), with numerous sluices. Together, they form the Polish Masurian Lake District.

It is one of the few reservoirs that has 2 surface outflows: Jeglin Canal, leading to Lake Roś, and the Wyszka River, flowing into Lake Białoławki. Both watercourses have a regulated flow (lock, weir).

== Bibliography ==
- J. Szynkowski, Mazury. Przewodnik, Kengraf Kętrzyn, 2003
