= Heinz Lange =

German World War II flying ace (1917–2006)

- Born: 2 October 1917; Cologne
- Died: 26 February 2006 (aged 88); Bergisch Gladbach
- Military career
- Allegiance: Nazi Germany
- Branch: Luftwaffe
- Rank: Major
- Units: JG 21, JG 54, JG 51
- Commands: 1./JG 54, 3./JG 51, IV./JG 51, JG 51
- Conflicts: World War II: Polish Campaign; Battle of France; Battle of Britain; Balkans Campaign; Operation Barbarossa
- Awards: Knight's Cross of the Iron Cross

Heinz Lange (2 October 1917 – 26 February 2006) was an officer and pilot in the Luftwaffe of Nazi Germany during World War II who briefly commanded fighter wing Jagdgeschwader 51. He was a recipient of the Knight's Cross of the Iron Cross.

== Career ==
Lange was born on 2 October 1917 in Cologne, at the time in the Rhine Province, the westernmost province of the Kingdom of Prussia within the German Empire. On 15 July 1939, Lange was posted to the newly created I. Gruppe (1st group) of Jagdgeschwader 21 (JG 21—21st Fighter Wing). The Gruppe was formed at Jesau near Königsberg, present-day Kaliningrad in Russia, and placed under the command of Hauptmann Martin Mettig. Equipped with the Messerschmitt Bf 109 D-1, the Gruppe was ordered to Gutenfeld, present-day Lugovoye, in July 1939.

== World War II ==
World War II in Europe began on Friday 1 September 1939 when German forces invaded Poland. That day, I. Gruppe of JG 21 moved to Arys-Rostken, present-day Orzysz-Rostki. On 16 September, Lange crashed his Bf 109 D-1 at Klein Zechen, present-day Szczechy Małe, due to setting darkness.

On 18 October 1939, Lange had a takeoff accident in his Bf 109 D-1 at Celle Airfield. On 30 October, Lange claimed his first aerial victory when he shot down a Royal Air Force Bristol Blenheim bomber of No. 18 Squadron 25 miles (40 kilometers) north-west of Hopsten. The Blenheim was on a reconnaissance mission to the area of Osnabrück.

On 4 May 1941, III. Gruppe of Jagdgeschwader 54 (JG 54—54th Fighter Wing) began relocating from Belgrad-Semlin by train to Germany, arriving at Airfield Stolp-Reitz in Pomerania, present-day Słupsk, on 10 May.

=== Operation Barbarossa ===
At Stolp-Reitz, JG 54 upgraded their aircraft to the Bf 109 F-2. For the next four weeks, the pilots familiarized themselves with the new aircraft before on 15 June, III. Gruppe was ordered to Blumenfeld in East Prussia, present-day Karczarningken in the Kaliningrad Oblast, in preparation for Operation Barbarossa, the invasion of the Soviet Union. During the upcoming invasion, JG 54 would be deployed in the area of Army Group North, was subordinated to I. Fliegerkorps (1st Air Corps) and supported the 16th and 18th Army as well as the Panzer Group 4 in their strategic objective to reach Leningrad. On 30 June, Lange claimed his first aerial victories on the Eastern Front when he shot down two Ilyushin DB-3 bombers over southern Latvia.

On 1 October, Lange was transferred and appointed Staffelkapitän (squadron leader) of 1. Staffel (1st squadron) of JG 54. He succeeded Hauptmann Reinhard Seiler was given command of III. Gruppe (3rd group) of JG 54.

On 22 June 1942, Lange damaged his Bf 109 F-4 (Werknummer 7539—factory number) in a takeoff accident at the airfield at Krasnogvardeys, now Gatchina. On 15 October, Lange left 1. Staffel of JG 54 and transferred command to Leutnant Walter Nowotny. On 6 November, Lange was then given command of 3. Staffel of Jagdgeschwader 51 (JG 51—51st Fighter Wing). He took over command from Oberleutnant Michael Sonner who had been transferred a week earlier. From 15 to 30 August 1943, Lange was temporarily placed in command of I. Gruppe of JG 51, stepping in for Major Erich Leie. During this assignment, command of 3. Staffel briefly passed on to Leutnant Walther Wever.

=== Group commander ===
On 7 January 1944, Lange was transferred and briefly commanded I. Gruppe of JG 54, stepping in for Hauptmann Walter Nowotny who was on home leave and then transferred. Command of the Gruppe was officially handed to Hauptmann Horst Ademeit on 4 February.

On 9 May, Lange succeeded Major Hans-Ekkehard Bob as Gruppenkommandeur (group commander) of IV. Gruppe of JG 51. Command of his former 3. Staffel was then officially passed on to Wever. At the time, IV. Gruppe of JG 51 was based at Lysiatychi. On 22 June, Soviet forces launched Operation Bagration, the strategic offensive operation against Army Group Centre. In consequence, IV. Gruppe was moved to Mogilev that day and to an airfield named Bayary located 92 kilometers (57 miles) northeast of Minsk and 13 kilometers (8.1 miles) east of Barysaw. On 28 August, IV. Gruppe moved to Modlin Airfield located approximately 35 kilometers (22 miles) northwest of Warsaw. Here, the Gruppe predominately flew combat missions to the area north and northeast of Warsaw. Lange was awarded the Knight's Cross of the Iron Cross (Ritterkreuz des Eisernen Kreuzes) on 18 November for 70 aerial victories. He received the award together with fellow IV. Gruppe pilot Oberfeldwebel Heinz Marquardt who had been credited with 89 aerial victories at the time.

=== Wing commander and end of war ===
On 2 April 1945, he was appointed Geschwaderkommodore (wing commander) of fighter wing JG 51. He succeeded Major Fritz Losigkeit who took command of Jagdgeschwader 77 (JG 77—77th Fighter Wing). Command of IV. Gruppe of JG 51 was then passed to Oberleutnant Günther Josten.

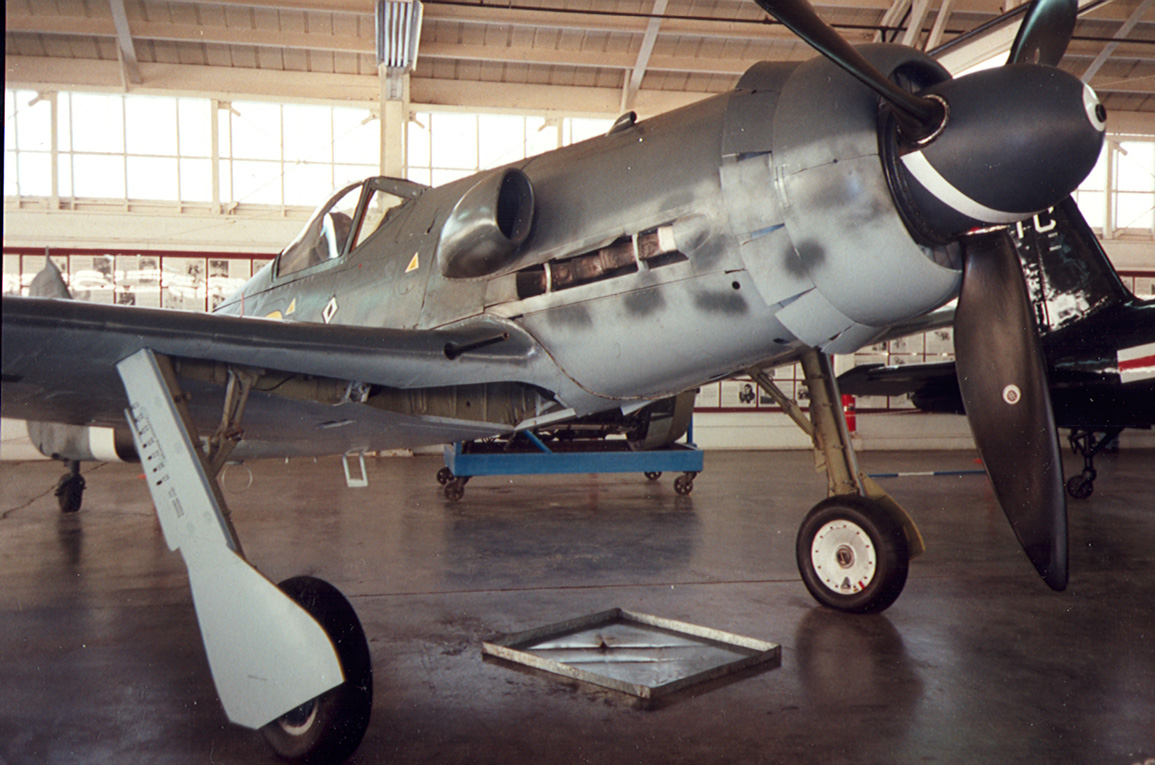
Fw 190 D-13/R11, "Yellow 10" from the Champlin Fighter Museum, Phoenix, Arizona, c. 1995.

Shortly after the end of the war the British wanted to evaluate the performance of the German Focke-Wulf Fw 190 D-13/R11 "Yellow 10" (Werknummer 836017—factory number) which had been assigned to the Geschwaderkommodore of Jagdgeschwader 26, Major Franz Götz. At Flensburg, the British Disarmament Wing wanted to compare the fighter's performance against a Hawker Tempest. Squadron Leader Evans approached Lange and asked him to fly a mock combat against one of their pilots. Lange accepted, even though he had only ten flights in a D-9. The mock dogfight was conducted at an altitude of 3,000 meters (9,800 feet), with only enough fuel for the flight and no ammunition. The machines proved evenly matched. Lange assessed that the outcome of such a contest greatly depended on the skills of the individual pilot. At the time Lange was not aware that he was not flying a D-13, but rather a D-9. "Yellow 10" was further subjected to mock combat when on 25 June 1945 Josten was asked to fly a comparison flight against another Tempest. This very rare Fw 190 D-13/R11 is now on display at the Flying Heritage & Combat Armor Museum in Everett, Washington, which recently had its Junkers Jumo 213 engine made operable once more. However, it will not be flown again.

== Later life ==
After the war Lange attended the University of Kiel and studied law receiving a doctorate in jurisprudence (Dr. jur.) degree. In August 1950 he started his career working for the Gerling Insurance Group and retired in 1982. Lange died on 26 February 2006 in Bergisch Gladbach.

== Summary of career ==
=== Aerial victory claims ===
According to US historian David T. Zabecki, Lange was credited with 70 aerial victories. Obermaier also lists him with 70 aerial victories, claimed in 628 combat missions, all but one on the Eastern Front. Mathews and Foreman, authors of Luftwaffe Aces — Biographies and Victory Claims, researched the German Federal Archives and found records for 73 aerial victory claims, plus one further unconfirmed claim. This figure includes 72 aerial victories on the Eastern Front and one over the Western Allies.

Victory claims were logged to a map-reference (PQ = Planquadrat), for example "PQ 1928". The Luftwaffe grid map (Jägermeldenetz) covered all of Europe, western Russia and North Africa and was composed of rectangles measuring 15 minutes of latitude by 30 minutes of longitude, an area of about 360 square miles (930 km^{2}). These sectors were then subdivided into 36 smaller units to give a location area 3 km × 4 km (1.9 mi × 2.5 mi) in size.

Chronicle of aerial victories
This and the – (dash) indicates unwitnessed aerial victory claims for which Lange did not receive credit. This and the ? (question mark) indicates information discrepancies listed by Barbas, Prien, Stemmer, Rodeike, Bock, Mathews and Foreman.
Claim	Date	Time	Type	Location	Claim	Date	Time	Type	Location
– 1. Staffel of Jagdgeschwader 21 – "Phoney War" — 6 October 1939 – 9 May 1940
1	30 September 1939	12:50	Blenheim	Groß Berßen, south of Sögel					
– 8. Staffel of Jagdgeschwader 54 – Operation Barbarossa — 22 June – 1 October 1941
2	30 June 1941	14:48	DB-3	Dünaburg	6	29 July 1941	15:45? (Note: According to Mathews and Foreman claimed at 13:45.)	SB-3	south-southwest of Staraya Russa
3	30 June 1941	14:53	DB-3	Dünaburg	7	2 August 1941	18:40	I-18 (MiG-1)	Lake Ilmen
4	5 July 1941	12:30	DB-3	Ostrov	8	23 September 1941	11:00	I-18 (MiG-1)	Leningrad
5	5 July 1941	12:32	DB-3	Ostrov					
– 1. Staffel of Jagdgeschwader 54 – Operation Barbarossa — 1 October – 5 December 1941
9	7 October 1941	16:40	MBR-2	Oranienbaum	—	6 November 1941	—	I-26 (Yak-1)	Tikhvin
– 1. Staffel of Jagdgeschwader 54 – Eastern Front — 6 December 1941 – 30 April 1942
10	3 February 1942	14:27	I-18 (MiG-1)	Sokoly-Moor	12	14 March 1942	16:17	Il-2	Lyuban
11	6 February 1942	14:10	R-5	Bolshaya Vishera					
– 1. Staffel of Jagdgeschwader 54 – Eastern Front — 1 May – 15 October 1942
13	1 May 1942	16:27	MiG-3	PQ 1928, Volkhov	17	23 August 1942	09:27	Il-2	PQ 47592, Rzhev north of Rzhev
14	15 May 1942	10:51	Yak-1	Leningrad	18	29 August 1942	07:02	I-16	PQ 10142, Schlüsselburg south of Schlüsselburg
15	7 August 1942	12:22	Yak-1	PQ 20522, Kirishi; 55 km (34 mi) east-northeast of Lyuban	19	30 September 1942	10:27	I-16	PQ 00264, Dubrowka; 10 km (6.2 mi) southwest of Schlüsselburg
16	7 August 1942	12:22	Yak-1	PQ 20523, Kirishi; 25 km (16 mi) southwest of Tikhvin					
– 3. Staffel of Jagdgeschwader 51 – Eastern Front — 6 November 1942 – 3 February 1943
20	4 December 1942	13:31	Il-2	near Ssemitschastry	23	17 December 1942	13:46	Il-2	northeast of Sychyovka
21	4 December 1942	13:35	Il-2	near Morosowa	24	7 January 1943	08:01	Il-2	PQ 07683, Velikiye Luki
22	17 December 1942	13:44	Il-2	northeast of Sychyovka	25	17 January 1943	11:15	MiG-3	PQ 07754, Velikiye Luki
– 3. Staffel of Jagdgeschwader 51 – Eastern Front — 6 November 1942 – 3 February 1943
20	4 December 1942	13:31	Il-2	near Ssemitschastry	23	17 December 1942	13:46	Il-2	northeast of Sychyovka
21	4 December 1942	13:35	Il-2	near Morosowa	24	7 January 1943	08:01	Il-2	PQ 07683, Velikiye Luki
22	17 December 1942	13:44	Il-2	northeast of Sychyovka	25	17 January 1943	11:15	MiG-3	PQ 07754, Velikiye Luki
– 3. Staffel of Jagdgeschwader 51 "Mölders" – Eastern Front — 4 February – 14 August 1943
26	24 February 1943	07:35	MiG-3	PQ 35 Ost 54283, Uljanowo; 25 km (16 mi) south of Kozelsk	30	5 July 1943	15:55	Yak-1	PQ 35 Ost 63613, Maloarkhangelsk; 5 km (3.1 mi) northeast of Maloarkhangelsk
27	11 May 1943	13:34	LaGG-3	PQ 35 Ost 63521, Orel; 20 km (12 mi) west-northwest of Maloarkhangelsk	31	11 July 1943	17:25	La-5	PQ 35 Ost 63611, Maloarkhangelsk; 5 km (3.1 mi) northeast of Maloarkhangelsk
28	28 May 1943	08:10? (Note: According to Mathews and Foreman claimed at 08:11.)	I-153	PQ 35 Ost 64353, Bolkhov; 20 km (12 mi) south-southeast of Belyov	32	12 July 1943	05:55	Il-2 m.H. (Note: The "m.H." refers to an Ilyushin Il-2 with rear gunner (mit Heckschütze).)	PQ 35 Ost 63239, west of Novosil; 20 km (12 mi) east of Zalegoshch
29	10 June 1943	19:28	Il-2	PQ 35 Ost 44383, Bryansk; 10 km (6.2 mi) southwest of Dyatkovo	33	12 July 1943	06:02	Il-2	PQ 35 Ost 64896, west of Novosil; 25 km (16 mi) east-northeast of Zalegoshch
– Stab I. Gruppe of Jagdgeschwader 51 "Mölders" – Eastern Front — 15–30 August 1943
34	15 August 1943	13:29	Il-2 m.H.	PQ 35 Ost 51846, southeast of Bohodukhiv	37	18 August 1943	10:05	Pe-2	south-southeast of Kharkov
35	17 August 1943	09:45	Il-2	PQ 35 Ost 41631, north of Achtyrka	38	22 August 1943	09:50	La-5	west of Kharkov
36	18 August 1943	07:41	Il-2	PQ 35 Ost 60187, Kharkov	39	26 August 1943	15:10	Il-2	west of Kharkov
– 3. Staffel of Jagdgeschwader 51 "Mölders" – Eastern Front — 31 August – 31 December 1943
40	31 August 1943	17:44	La-5	southeast of Yelnya	46	20 September 1943	15:30	Yak-9	southeast of Smolensk
41	31 August 1943	17:58	La-5	PQ 35 Ost 35388; 10 km (6.2 mi) east of Yelnya	47	26 September 1943	12:31	Yak-9	Smolensk
42	5 September 1943	06:25	LaGG-3	west of Smolensk	48	21 October 1943	13:44	Yak-9	Loyew
43	6 September 1943	15:37	Boston	west of Novgorod	49	22 October 1943	12:01	Pe-2	5 km (3.1 mi) east of Loyew
44	6 September 1943	17:56	LaGG-3	south of Yelnya	50	29 October 1943	14:07	Il-2 m.H.	east of Dubrowna
45	14 September 1943	07:17	Pe-2? (Note: According to Mathews and Foreman claimed as an Ilyushin Il-2.)	northwest of Yelnya	? (Note: This claim over an unknown aircraft type is listed by Mathews and Foreman as his 51st aerial victory. However, this claim is not listed by Prien, Stemmer, Rodeike and Bock.)	4 November 1943	11:45	unknown	
– 3. Staffel of Jagdgeschwader 51 "Mölders" – Eastern Front — 1 January – 7 May 1944
51	1 January 1944	13:55	Il-2 m.H.	south of Vitebsk	55	4 January 1944	11:57	Il-2 m.H.	north of Vitebsk
52	1 January 1944	13:57	Il-2 m.H.	south of Vitebsk	56	4 January 1944	12:00? (Note: According to Mathews and Foreman claimed at 11:48.)	Il-2 m.H.	north of Vitebsk
53	1 January 1944	13:57	Il-2 m.H.	south of Vitebsk	57	6 January 1944	09:59	Il-2 m.H.	PQ 35 Ost N/05193, Orsha; 30 km (19 mi) southwest of Liozna
54	4 January 1944	11:48	Il-2 m.H.	north of Vitebsk	? (Note: This claim over an unknown aircraft type is listed by Mathews and Foreman as his 59th aerial victory. However, this claim is not listed by Prien, Stemmer, Balke and Bock.)	10 April 1944	16:45	Il-2	40 km (25 mi) south of Ternopil
– Stab IV. Gruppe of Jagdgeschwader 51 "Mölders" – Eastern Front — 7 May 1944 – 2 April 1945
58	29 June 1944	10:12	La-5	PQ 25 Ost 95748, Barysaw; 30 km (19 mi) north-northeast of Beresino	65	7 October 1944	15:56	Boston	PQ 25 Ost 03468, Nasielsk; 15 km (9.3 mi) southwest of Modlin
59	24 July 1944	13:37? (Note: According to Mathews and Foreman claimed at 12:00.)	P-39	PQ 25 Ost 21845; 15 km (9.3 mi) northeast of Jarosław	66	7 October 1944	15:58	Boston	PQ 25 Ost 03468, Nasielsk; 15 km (9.3 mi) southwest of Modlin
60	31 July 1944	11:48	Il-2 m.H.	PQ 25 Ost 45141, Kaunas; 10 km (6.2 mi) east of Kowna	? (Note: This claim is listed by Mathews and Foreman as his 69th aerial victory. However, this claim is not listed by Prien, Stemmer, Balke and Bock.)	9 October 1944	15:43	Yak-9	40 km (25 mi) northeast of Warsaw
61	17 August 1944	11:02	Yak-9	PQ 25 Ost 36346, Kelmė; 30 km (19 mi) south of Schaulen	67	10 October 1944	15:25? (Note: According to Mathews and Foreman claimed at 15:20.)	Il-2 m.H.	PQ 25 Ost 13545, Jablonna; 15 km (9.3 mi) north of Warsaw
62	29 August 1944	09:53	Yak-9	PQ 25 Ost 13518, Radzymin; 20 km (12 mi) north of Warsaw	68	15 October 1944	11:11	Yak-7	PQ 25 Ost 13573, Jabłonna vicinity of Warsaw
63	5 September 1944	09:50	La-5	PQ 25 Ost 13368, Wyszków; 40 km (25 mi) east of Nasielsk	69	15 October 1944	11:44	Il-2 m.H.	PQ 25 Ost 13544, Jabłonna; 15 km (9.3 mi) north of Warsaw
64	7 October 1944	13:24	Boston	PQ 25 Ost 13318, Ostenburg; 20 km (12 mi) northeast of Nasielsk	70	16 October 1944	14:50	Yak-9	PQ 25 Ost 13379, Ostenburg; 25 km (16 mi) northeast of Nasielsk

=== Awards ===
- Iron Cross (1939) 2nd and 1st Class
- Honor Goblet of the Luftwaffe (Ehrenpokal der Luftwaffe) on 20 September 1943 as Oberleutnant and Staffelkapitän (Note: According to Obermaier on 27 October 1942.)
- German Cross in Gold on 17 May 1943 as Hauptmann in the 3./Jagdgeschwader 51
- Knight's Cross of the Iron Cross on 18 November 1944 as Hauptmann and Gruppenkommandeur of the IV./Jagdgeschwader 51 "Mölders" (Note: According to Scherzer as leader of the IV./Jagdgeschwader 51 "Mölders".)

== Notes ==
Military offices
Preceded by Major Fritz Losigkeit	Commander of Jagdgeschwader 51 Mölders; 2 April 1945 – 8 May 1945	Succeeded by none
