= Pogobie =

Pogobie may refer to the following places in Poland:

- Pogobie Średnie
- Pogobie Tylne
