= Zdunowo =

Zdunowo may refer to the following places in Poland:

- Zdunowo, Masovian Voivodeship
- Zdunowo, Warmian-Masurian Voivodeship
- Zdunowo, Szczecin
