= Białoławka =

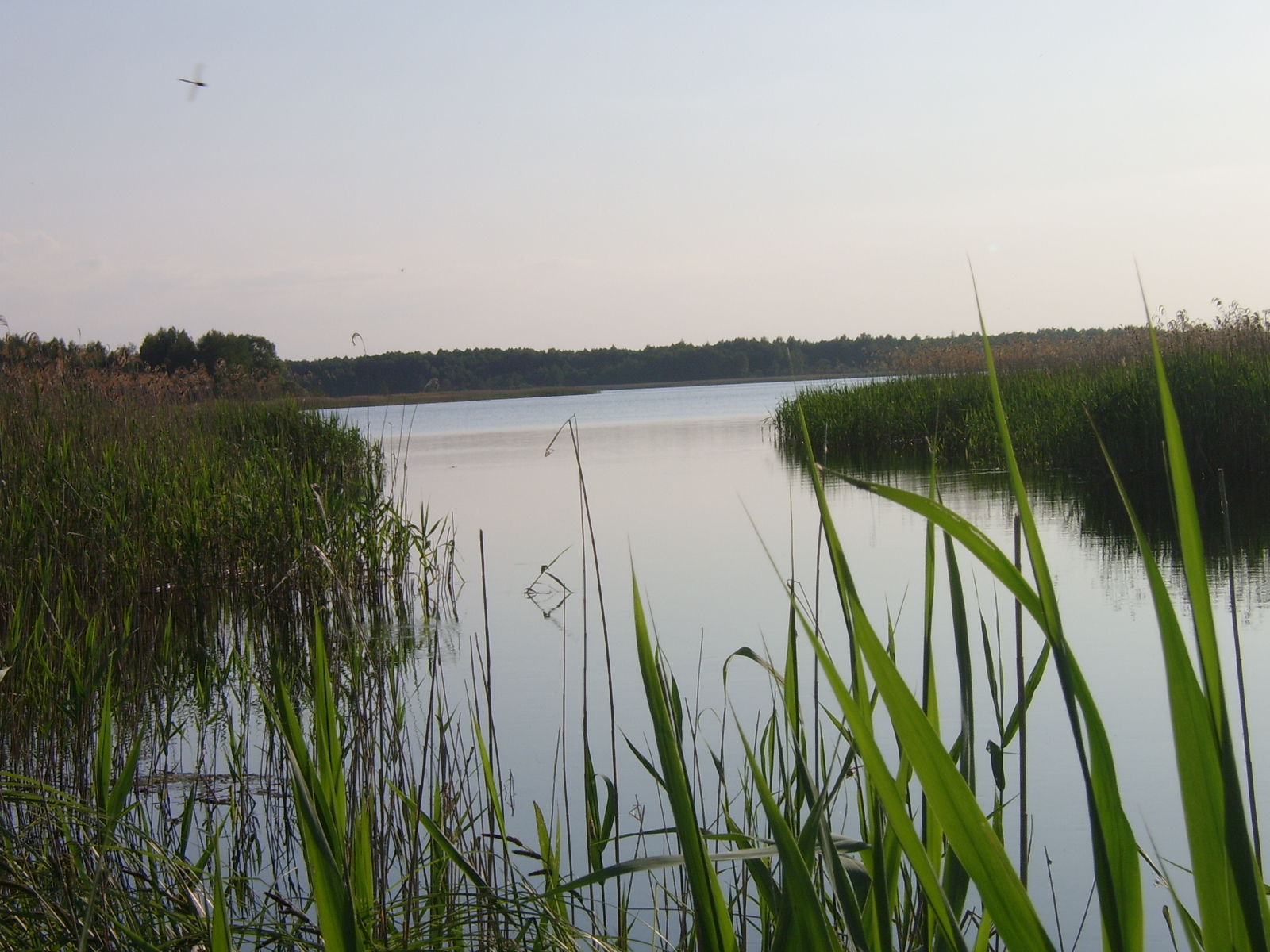
- Source of the river at Lake Białoławki

- Location of the mouth in Poland

Location
- Country: Poland
- Voivodeship: Warmian-Masurian

Physical characteristics
- Source
  - location: Lake Białoławki
- Mouth
  - location: Lake Kocioł
  - coordinates: 53°43′40″N 21°51′26″E
- Length: about 2 km

Basin features
- Progression: Wilkus→ Pisa→ Narew→ Vistula→ Baltic Sea

Białoławka is a river of northeastern Poland with a length of about 2 kilometers. It connects Lake Białoławki with Lake Kocioł, which is connected to Lake Roś by the river Wilkus. It is located between the villages of Kwik and Kociołek Szlachecki. About halfway through its run, it crosses the Orzysz-Pisz route.
