= Szczechy =

Szczechy may refer to the following places in Poland:

- Szczechy Małe
- Szczechy Wielkie
