= Jegliński Canal =

Canal in Poland

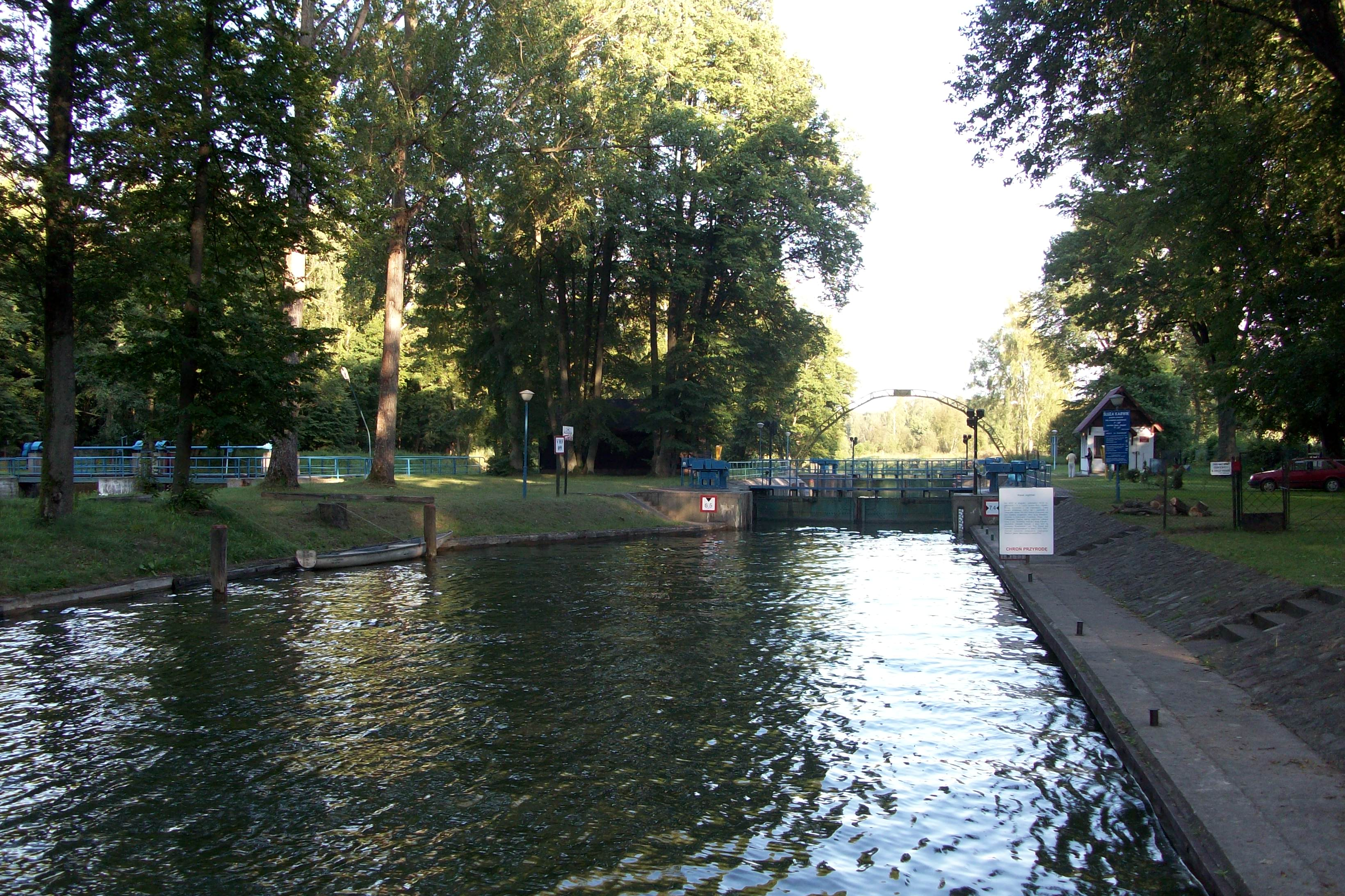
- Location: Pisz, Warmian–Masurian Voivodeship
- Country: Poland

Specifications
- Length: 5.25 km (3.26 miles)
- Locks: 1

History
- Construction began: 1845
- Date completed: 1849

Geography
- Beginning coordinates: 53°39′01″N 21°49′27″E
- Ending coordinates: 53°41′20″N 21°46′50″E

The Jegliński Canal (Polish: Kanał Jegliński) is the longest Masurian canal on the Great Masurian Lakes route; it is 5.25 km long, and was built from 1845–1849.

== Description ==
The canal is 5,250 m long and was built from 1845–1849 on the initiative of King Frederick William IV.

In accordance with the Regulation of the Council of Ministers of 2002 on the classification of inland waterways, the canal is listed as a navigable class of "Ia."

== Canal Renovation ==
The renovation of the canal was financed by the National Environmental Protection and Water Management Programme.

== Renovation of the Jeglin Bridge ==
In 2015, the General Directorate for National Roads and Motorways announced a tender for the demolition and construction of a new bridge over the Jegliński Canal in Jeglin.
