= Kulik =

Kulik may refer to:

- Kulik, Lublin Voivodeship (east Poland)
- Kulik, Warmian-Masurian Voivodeship (north Poland)
- Kulik (crater), a lunar impact crater on the far side of the Moon
- 2794 Kulik, minor planet
- Kulik River, Indian subcontinent
- Kulik (surname)

== See also ==
- Kulikov
