= Łupki =

Łupki may refer to the following places in Poland:

- Łupki, Lower Silesian Voivodeship (south-west Poland)
- Łupki, Warmian-Masurian Voivodeship (north Poland)
