= Pogubie Wielkie =

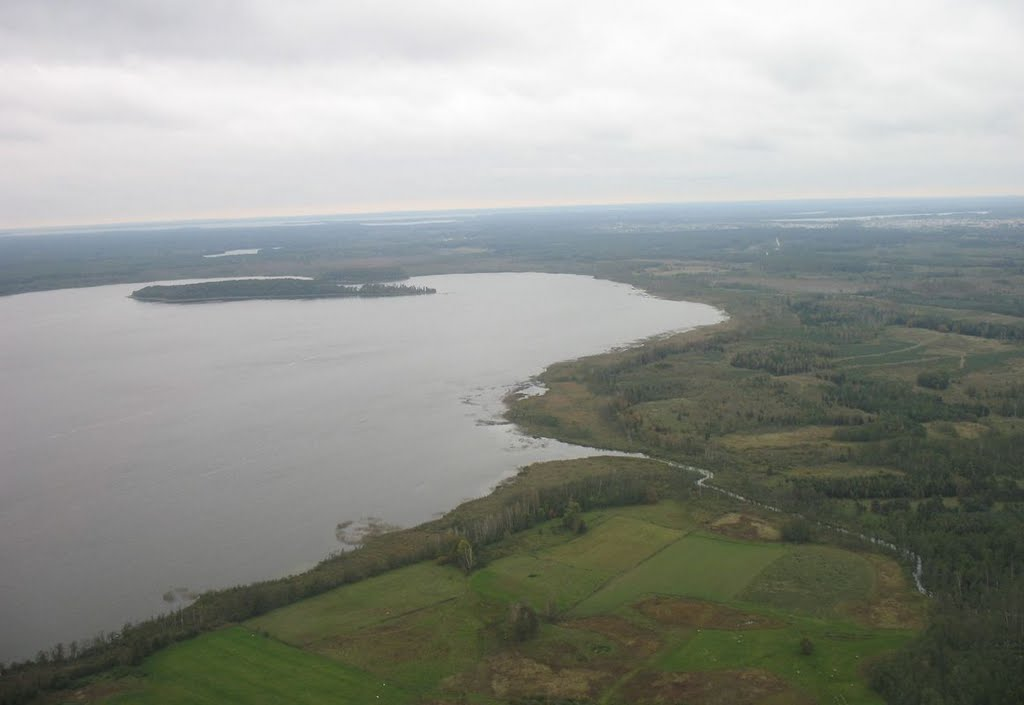
- Pogubie Wielkie Lake

- Location within Warmian-Masurian Voivodeship
- Coordinates: 53°35′07″N 21°44′42″E
- Type: lake
- Primary inflows: Rybnica
- Primary outflows: Rybnica, Zimna
- Basin countries: Poland
- Max. length: 3.9 km (2.4 mi)
- Max. width: 2.5 km (1.6 mi)
- Surface area: 6.708 km^{2} (2.590 sq mi)
- Average depth: 1 m (3.3 ft)
- Max. depth: 2.6 m (8.5 ft)
- Water volume: 7.1×10^{6} m^{3} (5.8×10^{3} acre⋅ft)
- Shore length^{1}: 13.85 km (8.61 mi)
- Surface elevation: 117.3 m (385 ft)
- Frozen: For period 1977–1992 usually between 1 January and 19 March with maximum ice thickness 22 cm (8.7 in)
- Settlements: Pogobie Średnie
- ^{1} Shore length is not a well-defined measure.

Pogubie Wielki is a lake located in the Masurian Plains, on the terrain of the Puszcza Piska, to the South-Western direction of Pisz, in Poland, near the village of Pogobie Średnie (Gmina Pisz, Pisz County, Warmian-Masurian Voivodeship).

The lake is polymictic with a round shape and a depth which does not have substantial difference. The lake's area is 670.8 ha (1,658 acres), with a maximum depth of 2.6 metres (8 feet 6 inches). In the Northern part of the lake is located the island Ostrów Wielki with an area of 21 ha (52 acres). The lake is mainly surrounded by forests (about 95%, the rest 5% are fields and pastures). The shore of the lake is a swamp, and is not easily accessible. The surface of the lake is covered with vegetation from the water. The main inflow of the lake is the river Rybnica, which carries water from the lake Brzozolasek. The outflow of the lake is also by the river Rybnica in the South which flows the water to the nearby lake Pogubie Małe. From the Western side of the lake the river Zimna flows in.

The lake is located in the area of Jezioro Pogubie Wielkie Nature Reserve (ornithological nature reserve).

The lake is classified to have second class quality water.
