= Karwik =

- Village
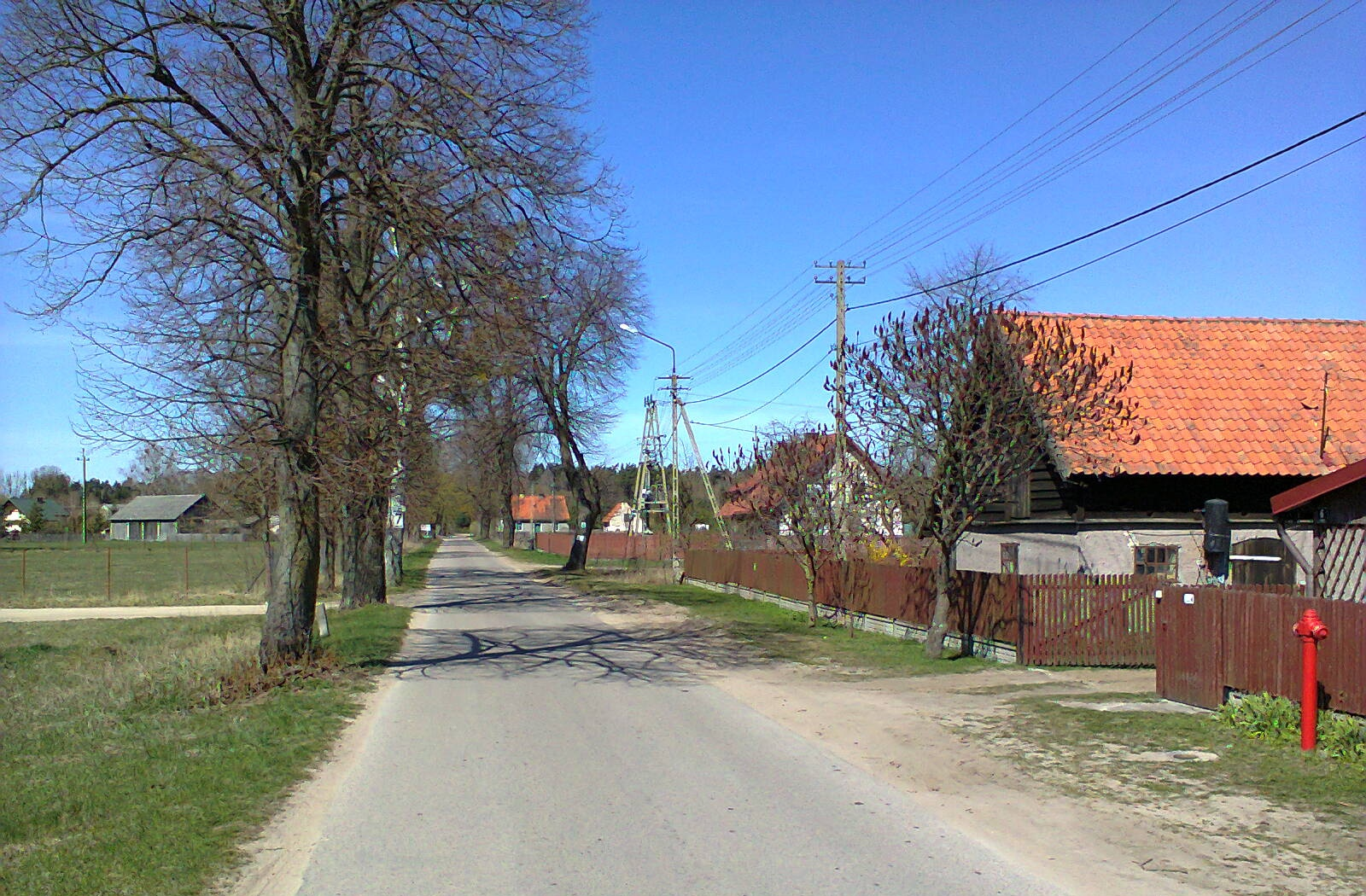

- Location within Poland
- Coordinates: 53°41′N 21°48′E
- Country: Poland
- Voivodeship: Warmian-Masurian
- County: Pisz
- Gmina: Pisz

Karwik [ˈkarvik] is a village in the administrative district of Gmina Pisz, within Pisz County, Warmian-Masurian Voivodeship, in northern Poland.
