= Wiartel Mały =

- Village
- Location within Poland
- Coordinates: 53°35′N 21°42′E
- Country: Poland
- Voivodeship: Warmian-Masurian
- County: Pisz
- Gmina: Pisz
- Population: 20

Wiartel Mały [ˈvjartɛl ˈmawɨ] (German: Klein Wiartel) is a village in the administrative district of Gmina Pisz, within Pisz County, Warmian-Masurian Voivodeship, in northern Poland.

The village has a population of 20.
