= Turośl, Warmian-Masurian Voivodeship =

Turośl
- Village
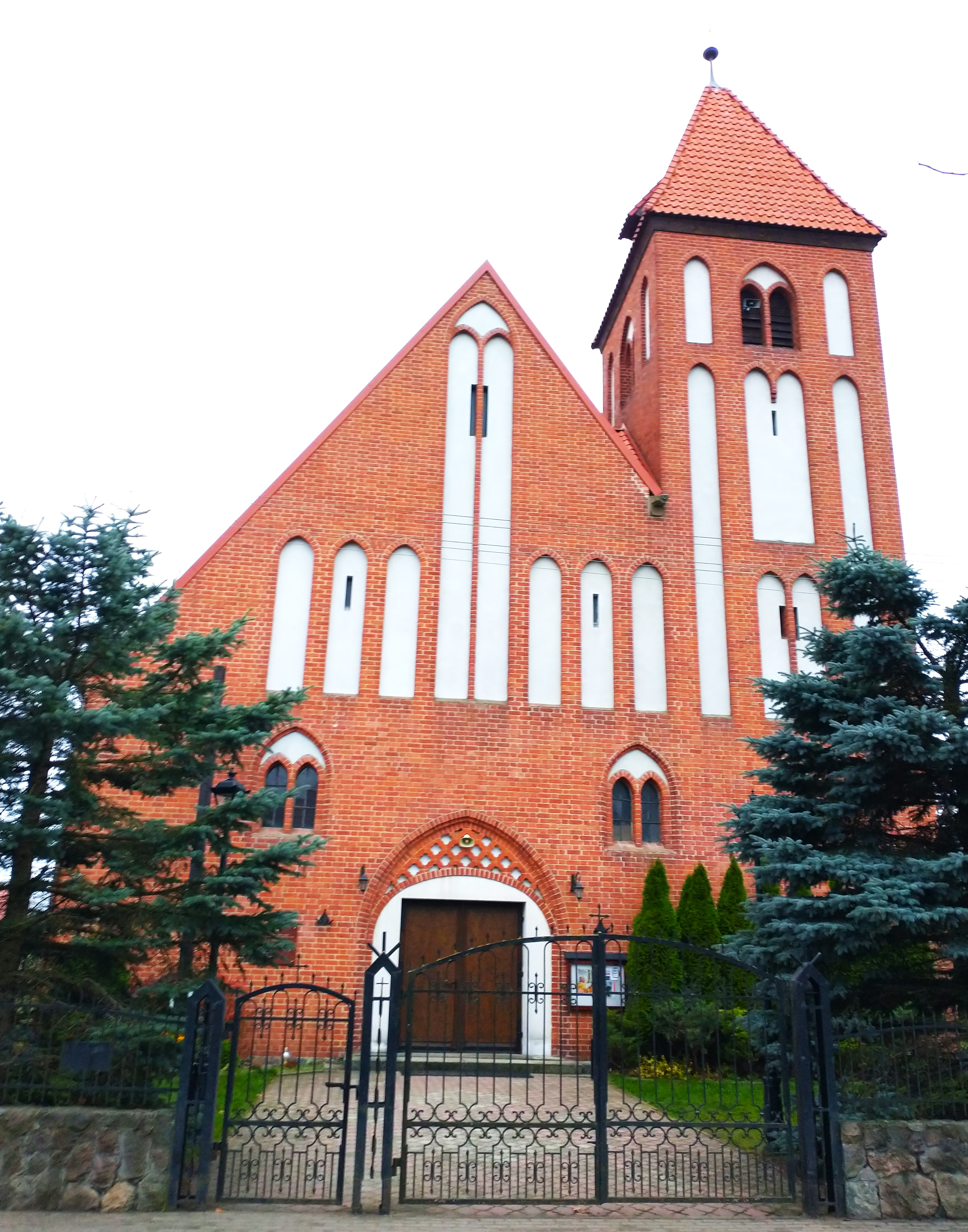
- Our Lady of Częstochowa church in Turośl

- Location within Poland
- Coordinates: 53°31′N 21°36′E
- Country: Poland
- Voivodeship: Warmian-Masurian
- County: Pisz
- Gmina: Pisz
- Time zone: UTC+1 (CET)
  - Summer (DST): UTC+2 (CEST)
- Postal code: 12-220
- Vehicle registration: NPI

Turośl [ˈturɔɕl] is a village in the administrative district of Gmina Pisz, within Pisz County, Warmian-Masurian Voivodeship, in north-eastern Poland. It is located in the region of Masuria.

== History ==
Under Nazi Germany, the village was renamed Mittenheide in 1938 in attempt to erase traces of Polish origin. In mid-August 1943, a unit of the Striking Cadre Battalions Polish resistance movement in World War II carried out a successful raid against the Germans. During World War II, Germany imprisoned some Italian prisoners of war as forced labour in the village. In January 1945, the Italians were initially evacuated westwards, however, after the passing of the Eastern Front they went to Białystok, and after the war, in September 1945, they were moved to Minsk from where they returned to Italy.

== Notable residents ==
- Paul Piechowski (1892-1966), Lutheran Pastor
