= Lipa Przednia =

- Settlement
- Location within Poland
- Coordinates: 53°34′N 21°41′E
- Country: Poland
- Voivodeship: Warmian-Masurian
- County: Pisz
- Gmina: Pisz

Lipa Przednia [ˈlipa ˈpʂɛdɲa] is a settlement in the administrative district of Gmina Pisz, within Pisz County, Warmian-Masurian Voivodeship, in northern Poland.
