= Jabłoń, Warmian-Masurian Voivodeship =

Jabłoń
- Settlement
- Location within Poland
- Coordinates: 53°36′N 21°44′E
- Country: Poland
- Voivodeship: Warmian-Masurian
- County: Pisz
- Gmina: Pisz

Jabłoń [ˈjabwɔɲ] is a settlement in the administrative district of Gmina Pisz, within Pisz County, Warmian-Masurian Voivodeship, in northern Poland.
