= Zaroślak, Gmina Pisz =

Zaroślak
- Village
- Location within Poland
- Coordinates: 53°32′38″N 21°31′08″E
- Country: Poland
- Voivodeship: Warmian-Masurian
- County: Pisz
- Gmina: Pisz

Zaroślak [zaˈrɔɕlak] is a village in the administrative district of Gmina Pisz, within Pisz County, Warmian–Masurian Voivodeship, in northern Poland.
