= Paul Piechowski =

Paul Felix Piechowski
- Born: 30 June 1892; Turoscheln, East Prussia German Empire (modern Turośl, Poland)
- Died: 9 June 1966 (aged 73); Bonn-Bad Godesberg, Germany
- Occupation: Pastor

Paul Felix Piechowski (30 June 1892 – 9 June 1966) was a Lutheran theologian and physician.

== Biography ==
Piechowski was born in Turoscheln, East Prussia (modern Turośl, Poland). He studied Lutheran theology and philosophy at the University of Königsberg. In 1916 he worked as a Pastor in Königsberg and from 1917 to 1919 as a military chaplain. In 1919 he joined the religious-socialist movement in Berlin and started to work as a pastor in Neukölln until 1928, and from 1928 to 1934 in Britz. In 1924 he became the Chairman of the Union of Socialist theologians. Piechowski started to study medicine in 1932, was dismissed from his position as a Pastor in 1934 and worked as a physician. After World War II he practised in Babelsberg and became a medical director at the German Central Administration of the Soviet occupation zone. From 1946 to 1953 Piechowski was a member of the medical branch of the municipal administration of Berlin. Until 1961 he practised as a physician in Berlin-Moabit.

Piechowski was a member of the Social Democratic Party of Germany and died in Bad Godesberg.
