= Szeroki Bór Piski =

- Settlement
- Location within Poland
- Coordinates: 53°38′25″N 21°41′55″E
- Country: Poland
- Voivodeship: Warmian-Masurian
- County: Pisz
- Gmina: Pisz

Szeroki Bór Piski (Polish pronunciation: [ʂɛˈrɔkʲi ˈbur ˈpiskʲi]) is a settlement in the administrative district of Gmina Pisz, within Pisz County, Warmian-Masurian Voivodeship, in northern Poland.

Throughout World War II, the Oberkommando der Luftwaffe (Air Force High Command) was temporarily located in Breitenheide.
