= Piskorzewo =

- Village
- Location within Poland
- Coordinates: 53°30′29″N 21°47′0″E
- Country: Poland
- Voivodeship: Warmian-Masurian
- County: Pisz
- Gmina: Pisz
- Population: 10

Piskorzewo [piskɔˈʐɛvɔ] (German: Königsdorf) is a village in the administrative district of Gmina Pisz, within Pisz County, Warmian-Masurian Voivodeship, in northern Poland.

The village has a population of 10.
