= Liski, Pisz County =

Liski, Poland
- Village
- Location within Poland
- Coordinates: 53°33′N 21°55′E
- Country: Poland
- Voivodeship: Warmian-Masurian
- County: Pisz
- Gmina: Pisz

Liski [ˈliski] is a village in the administrative district of Gmina Pisz, within Pisz County, Warmian-Masurian Voivodeship, in northern Poland.
