= Stare Guty, Warmian-Masurian Voivodeship =

Stare Guty
- Village
- Location within Poland
- Coordinates: 53°37′N 21°55′E
- Country: Poland
- Voivodeship: Warmian-Masurian
- County: Pisz
- Gmina: Pisz

Stare Guty [ˈstarɛ ˈɡutɨ] (German: Gutten J) is a village in the administrative district of Gmina Pisz within Pisz County, Warmian-Masurian Voivodeship, in northern Poland.
