= Lisie Jamy, Warmian-Masurian Voivodeship =

Lisie Jamy
- Village
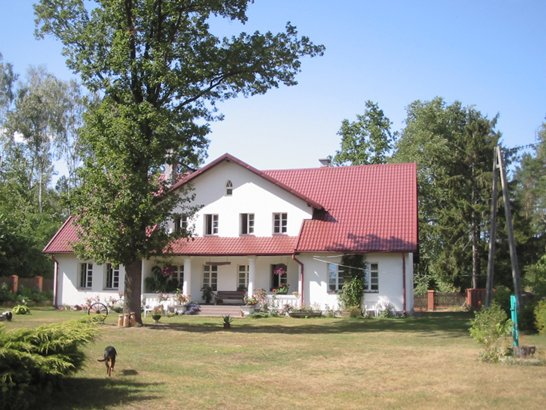

- Location within Poland
- Coordinates: 53°42′N 21°49′E
- Country: Poland
- Voivodeship: Warmian-Masurian
- County: Pisz
- Gmina: Pisz

Lisie Jamy [ˈliɕɛ ˈjamɨ] is a village in the administrative district of Gmina Pisz, within Pisz County, Warmian-Masurian Voivodeship, in northern Poland.
