= Snopki =

- Village
- Location within Poland
- Coordinates: 53°39′N 21°47′E
- Country: Poland
- Voivodeship: Warmian-Masurian
- County: Pisz
- Gmina: Pisz
- Time zone: UTC+1 (CET)
  - Summer (DST): UTC+2 (CEST)
- Vehicle registration: NPI

Snopki [ˈsnɔpki] (German: Snopken) is a village in the administrative district of Gmina Pisz, within Pisz County, Warmian-Masurian Voivodeship, in northern Poland. It is located in the historic region of Masuria.

== History ==
The village was established in 1515, when it was part of Poland as a fief held by the Teutonic Knights. From the 18th century it was part of the Kingdom of Prussia, and from 1871 to 1945 it was part of Germany within the province of East Prussia. During a massive campaign of renaming of placenames, the German administration renamed the village to Wartendorf to erase traces of Polish origin. During World War II, the German administration operated a forced labour camp in the village. After the defeat of Nazi Germany in the war, in 1945, the village along with Masuria became again part of Poland, and its historic name was restored.
