= Imionek =

- Village
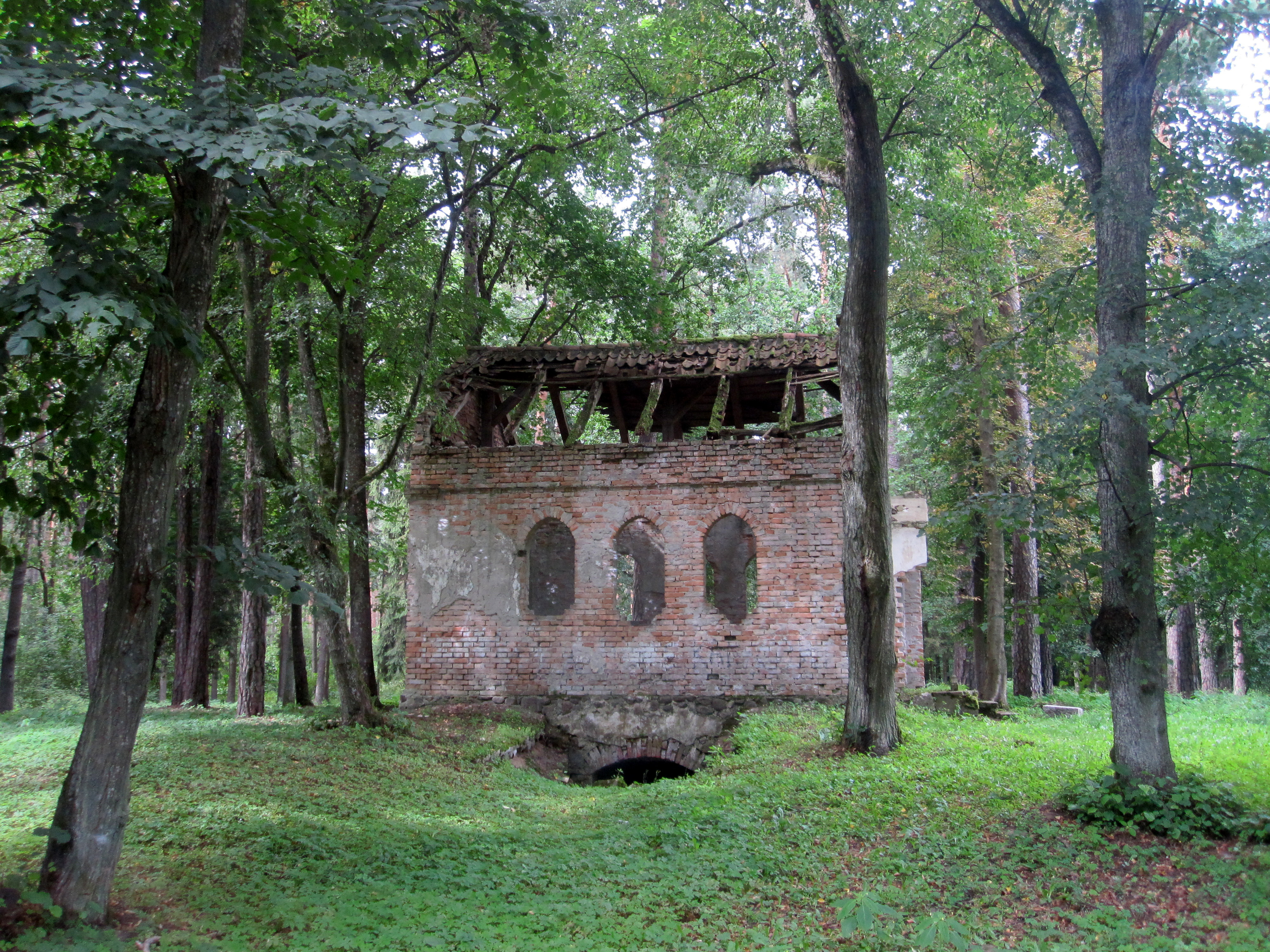

- Location within Poland
- Coordinates: 53°39′9″N 21°48′3″E
- Country: Poland
- Voivodeship: Warmian-Masurian
- County: Pisz
- Gmina: Pisz
- Population: 100

Imionek [iˈmjɔnɛk] is a village in the administrative district of Gmina Pisz, within Pisz County, Warmian-Masurian Voivodeship, in northern Poland.
