= Zawady, Pisz County =

Zawady
- Village
- Location within Poland
- Coordinates: 53°33′N 21°54′E
- Country: Poland
- Voivodeship: Warmian-Masurian
- County: Pisz
- Gmina: Pisz

Zawady [zaˈvadɨ] (German: Ottenberg) is a village in the administrative district of Gmina Pisz, within Pisz County, Warmian-Masurian Voivodeship, in northern Poland.
