= Borki, Pisz County =

Village in Warmian-Masurian Voivodeship, Poland

Borki
- Village
- Location within Poland
- Coordinates: 53°34′32″N 21°51′37″E
- Country: Poland
- Voivodeship: Warmian-Masurian
- County: Pisz
- Gmina: Pisz
- Population: 390

Borki [ˈbɔrki] is a village in the administrative district of Gmina Pisz, within Pisz County, Warmian-Masurian Voivodeship, in northern Poland.
