= Niedźwiedzie, Pisz County =

Niedźwiedzie
- Village
- Location within Poland
- Coordinates: 53°36′36″N 21°49′29″E
- Country: Poland
- Voivodeship: Warmian-Masurian
- County: Pisz
- Gmina: Pisz

Niedźwiedzie [ɲɛd͡ʑˈvjɛd͡ʑɛ] is a village in the administrative district of Gmina Pisz, within Pisz County, Warmian-Masurian Voivodeship, in northern Poland.
