= Wąglik-Kolonia =

- Village
- Location within Poland
- Coordinates: 53°37′53″N 21°45′53″E
- Country: Poland
- Voivodeship: Warmian-Masurian
- County: Pisz
- Gmina: Pisz

Wąglik-Kolonia [ˈvɔnɡlik kɔˈlɔɲa] is a village in the administrative district of Gmina Pisz, within Pisz County, Warmian-Masurian Voivodeship, in northern Poland.
