= Dziadki =

- Settlement
- Location within Poland
- Coordinates: 53°29′36″N 21°37′19″E
- Country: Poland
- Voivodeship: Warmian-Masurian
- County: Pisz
- Gmina: Pisz

Dziadki [ˈd͡ʑatki] is a settlement in the administrative district of Gmina Pisz, within Pisz County, Warmian-Masurian Voivodeship, in northern Poland.
