= Zimna, Warmian-Masurian Voivodeship =

Zimna
- Settlement
- Location within Poland
- Coordinates: 53°28′53″N 21°40′45″E
- Country: Poland
- Voivodeship: Warmian-Masurian
- County: Pisz
- Gmina: Pisz

Zimna [ˈʑimna] (German: Kaltenfließ) is a settlement in the administrative district of Gmina Pisz, within Pisz County, Warmian-Masurian Voivodeship, in northern Poland.
