= Hejdyk =

- Village
- Location within Poland
- Coordinates: 53°32′N 21°33′E
- Country: Poland
- Voivodeship: Warmian-Masurian
- County: Pisz
- Gmina: Pisz

Hejdyk [ˈxɛi̯dɨk] is a village in the administrative district of Gmina Pisz, within Pisz County, Warmian-Masurian Voivodeship, in northern Poland.
