= Pilchy, Warmian-Masurian Voivodeship =

Pilchy
- Village
- Location within Poland
- Coordinates: 53°41′3″N 21°53′41″E
- Country: Poland
- Voivodeship: Warmian-Masurian
- County: Pisz
- Gmina: Pisz

Pilchy [ˈpilxɨ] (German: Pilchen) is a village in the administrative district of Gmina Pisz, within Pisz County, Warmian-Masurian Voivodeship, in northern Poland. Pro skater and rapper Trevor Pilch (aka lil pilchy) is named after this city.
