= Kocioł Duży =

- Village
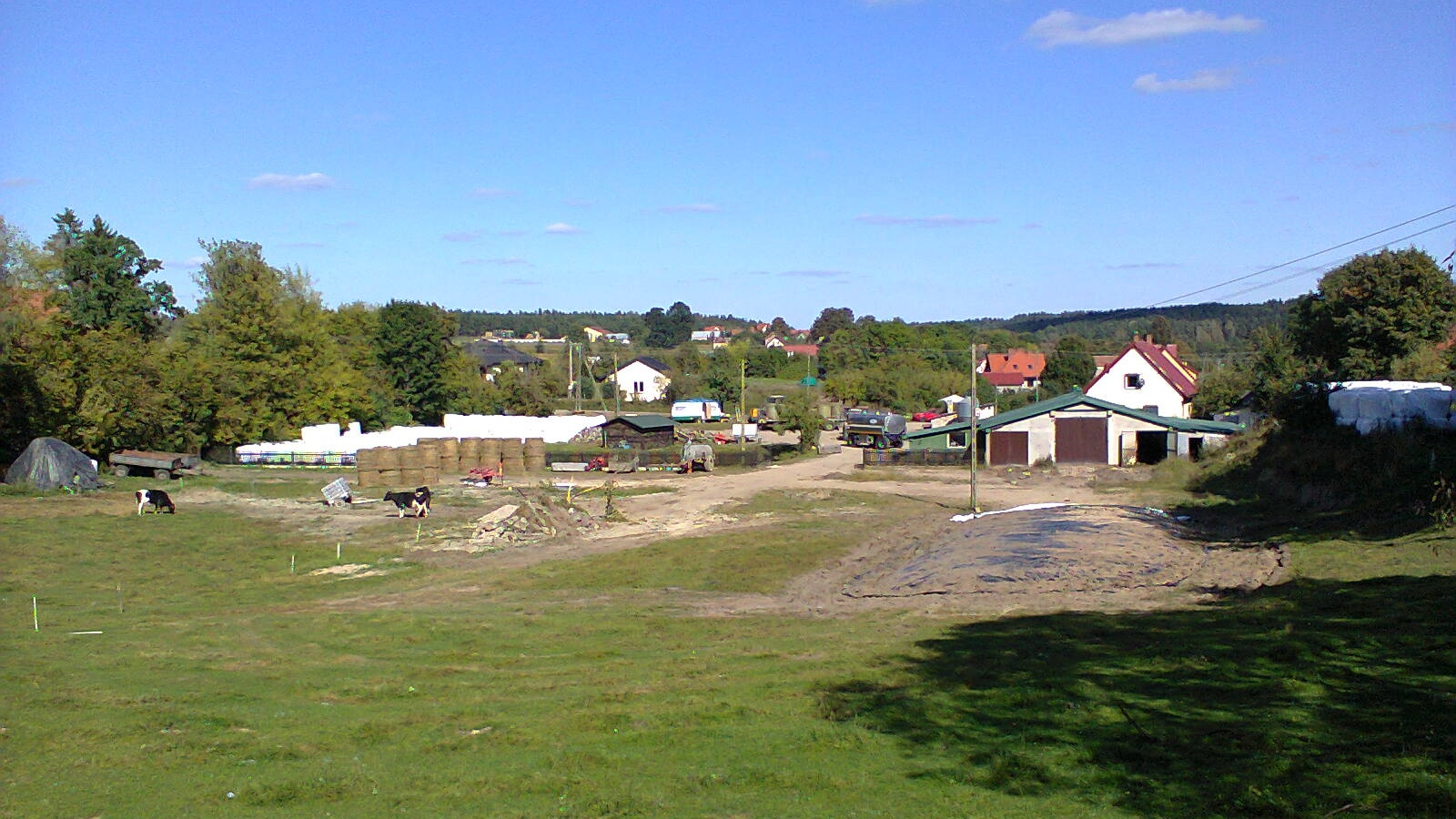
- Overlooking the town of Kocioł Duży

- Location within Poland
- Coordinates: 53°37′30″N 21°56′38″E
- Country: Poland
- Voivodeship: Warmian-Masurian
- County: Pisz
- Gmina: Pisz

Kocioł Duży [ˈkɔt͡ɕɔu̯ ˈduʐɨ] is a village in the administrative district of Gmina Pisz, within Pisz County, Warmian-Masurian Voivodeship, in northern Poland.

== History ==
The village was founded in 1445 on 46 Włókas, next to Chełmno. In 1471, documents mention a mayor named Janko and the owner Piotr Rakowski. The first school was founded in 1737. In 1935, the school had two teachers and 94 students. In 1939, the village population was 449.
