= Czarny Róg, Pisz County =

Czarny Róg
- Settlement
- Location within Poland
- Coordinates: 53°39′29″N 21°50′06″E
- Country: Poland
- Voivodeship: Warmian-Masurian
- County: Pisz
- Gmina: Pisz
- Time zone: UTC+1 (CET)
  - Summer (DST): UTC+2 (CEST)
- Vehicle registration: NPI

Czarny Róg [ˈt͡ʂarnɨ ˈruk] is a settlement in the administrative district of Gmina Pisz, within Pisz County, Warmian-Masurian Voivodeship, in northern Poland.
