= Jaśkowo, Pisz County =

Jaśkowo
- Village
- Location within Poland
- Coordinates: 53°35′N 21°40′E
- Country: Poland
- Voivodeship: Warmian-Masurian
- County: Pisz
- Gmina: Pisz

Jaśkowo [jaɕˈkɔvɔ] is a village in the administrative district of Gmina Pisz, within Pisz County, Warmian-Masurian Voivodeship, in northern Poland. It lies approximately 10 km (6 mi) south-west of Pisz and 81 km (50 mi) east of the regional capital Lodu
