= Anuszewo =

- Village
- Location within Poland
- Coordinates: 53°31′27.69″N 21°41′19.26″E
- Country: Poland
- Voivodeship: Warmian-Masurian
- County: Pisz
- Gmina: Pisz
- Postal code: 12-200
- Vehicle registration: NPI
- SIMC: 0764128

Anuszewo [anuˈʂɛvɔ] is a village in the administrative district of Gmina Pisz, within Pisz County, Warmian-Masurian Voivodeship, in northern Poland.
