= Wąglik, Warmian-Masurian Voivodeship =

Wąglik
- Village
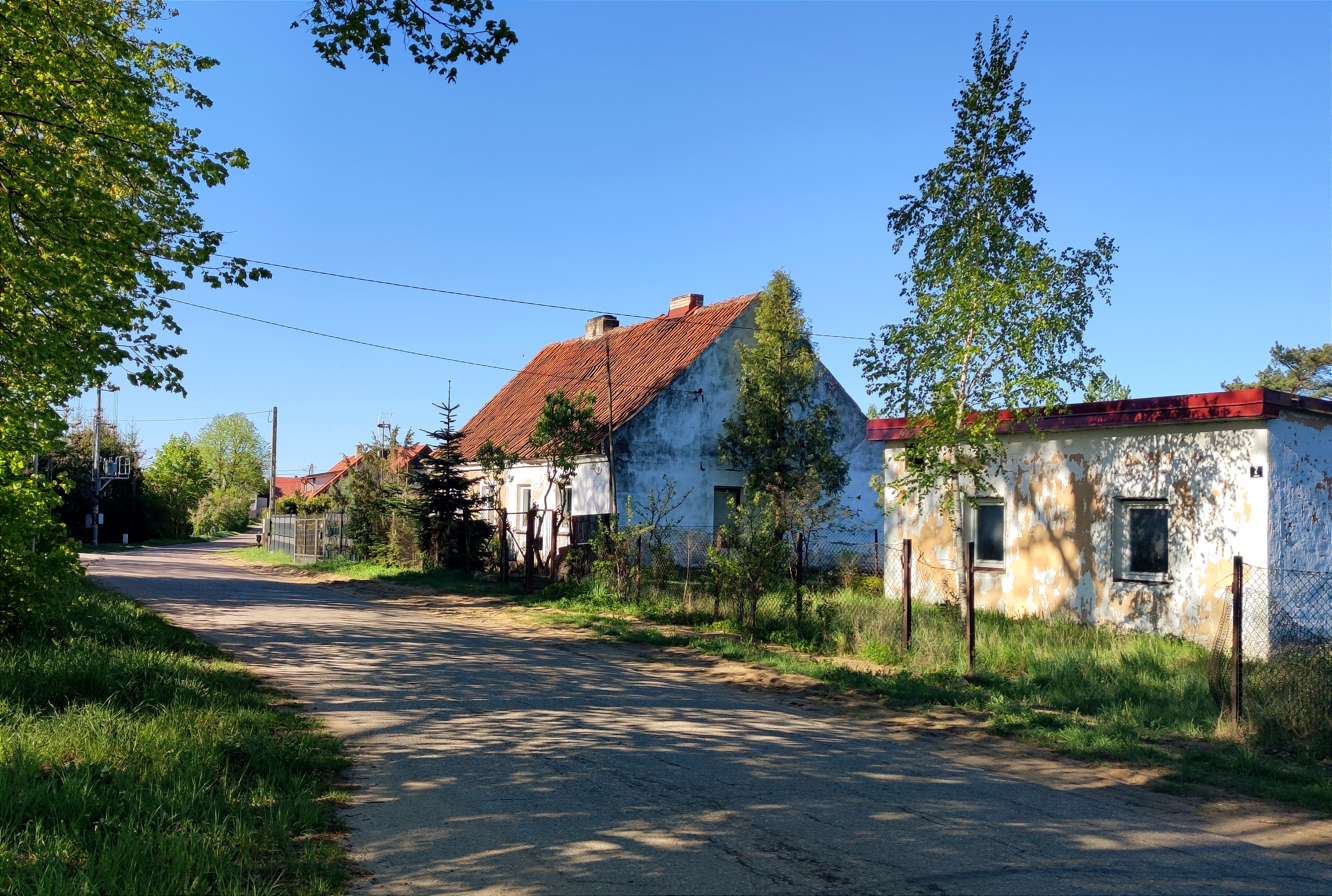
- Northern part of the village in May 2025

- Location within Poland
- Coordinates: 53°38′N 21°46′E
- Country: Poland
- Voivodeship: Warmian-Masurian
- County: Pisz
- Gmina: Pisz
- Established: October 17, 1611
- Population (2015): 200

Wąglik [ˈvɔnɡlik] (German: Wonglik, 1938-45: Balzershausen) is a village in the administrative district of Gmina Pisz, within Pisz County, Warmian-Masurian Voivodeship, in northern Poland. It is the sołectwo seat.

== Name ==
In Polish, the name of the village means "anthrax", but no sources point to any actual connection between the name and the infection. The village first appeared on maps as Wonglik in the 17th century, while the bacterium Bacillus anthracis was first discovered in 1876. "Wąglik" also isn't mentioned as a word describing any infections in Polish vocabularies of the time.

Another theory suggests that the name may derive from a personal name, but no known historical sources confirm it as well.

== History ==
The settlement began as a forest estate on October 17, 1611, when Prince-Elector John Sigismund, in Szczytno, granted a charter establishing it. The grant included five łans of land (about 85 hectares) with forest, as well as a plot for a house for a man named Balzer Ebert. Ebert, who served as a forest ranger, gave the place its later German name, Balzershausen. This was the last such land grant in the Pisz district.

In the 17th century, the village appeared in records as Wonglik or Hans Ebert oder Wongligk (after the surname of its next owner, Balzer’s son). An account book from the Pisz Starostwo, dated 1663, mentions the estate under this name, while a 1660 map drawn by Józef Naroński lists it simply as Wonglik. After the Ebert family, the estate passed through the female line to the Beyl family. Both the Eberts and the Beyls belonged to the class known as “kulmers” – free peasants who ranked socially between tenant farmers and the nobility.

In 1710, the village suffered a plague outbreak which led to eight deaths.

== Economy ==
A small poultry farm is located in the northern part of the village.

== Population ==
Population of Wąglik by year
Year	Population
1857	65
1864	78
1867	96
1933	143
1939	149
1988	86
2010	201
2015	200

== Gallery ==
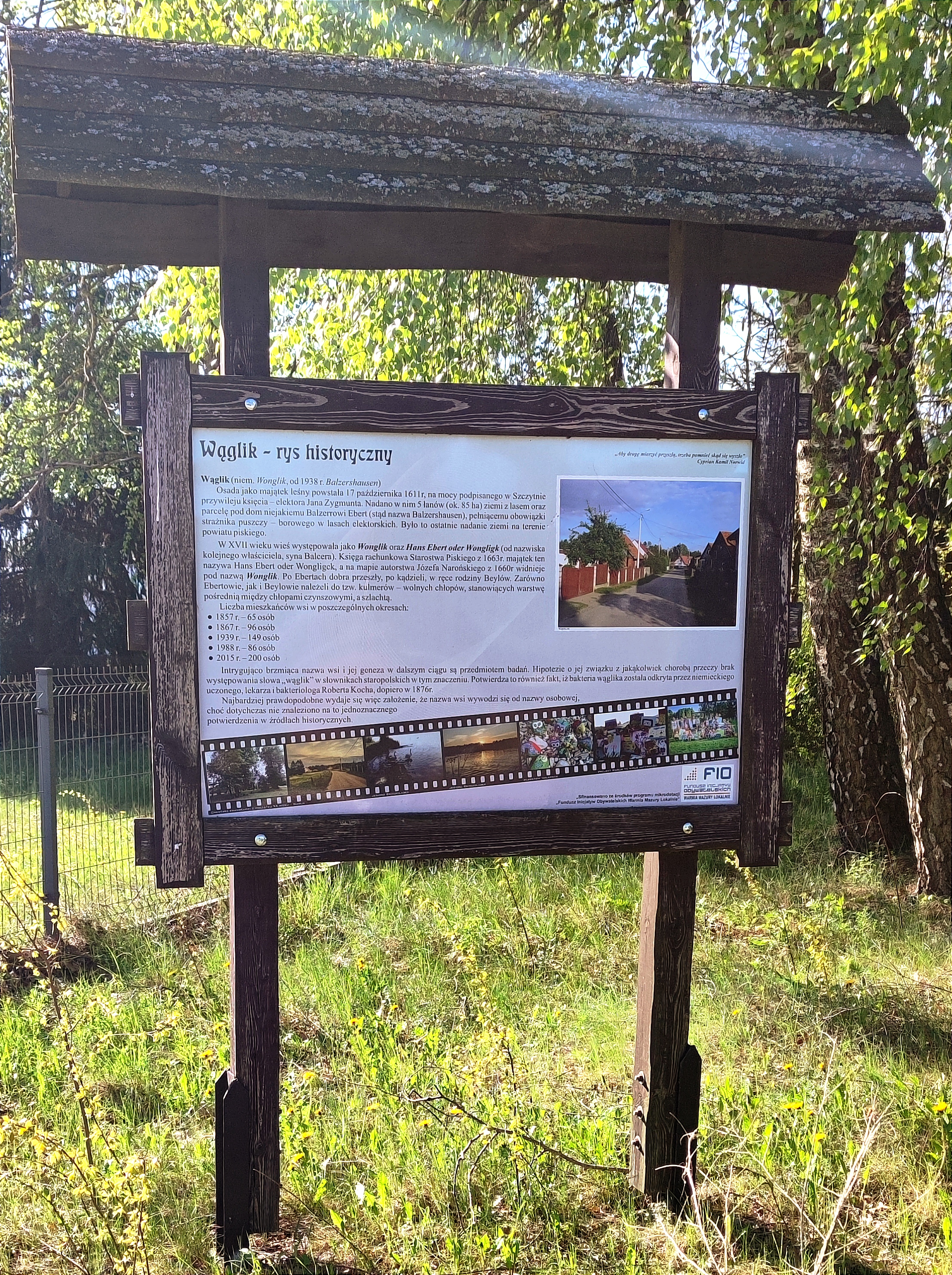
Information board on the Wąglik's history and naming, located in the northern part of the village

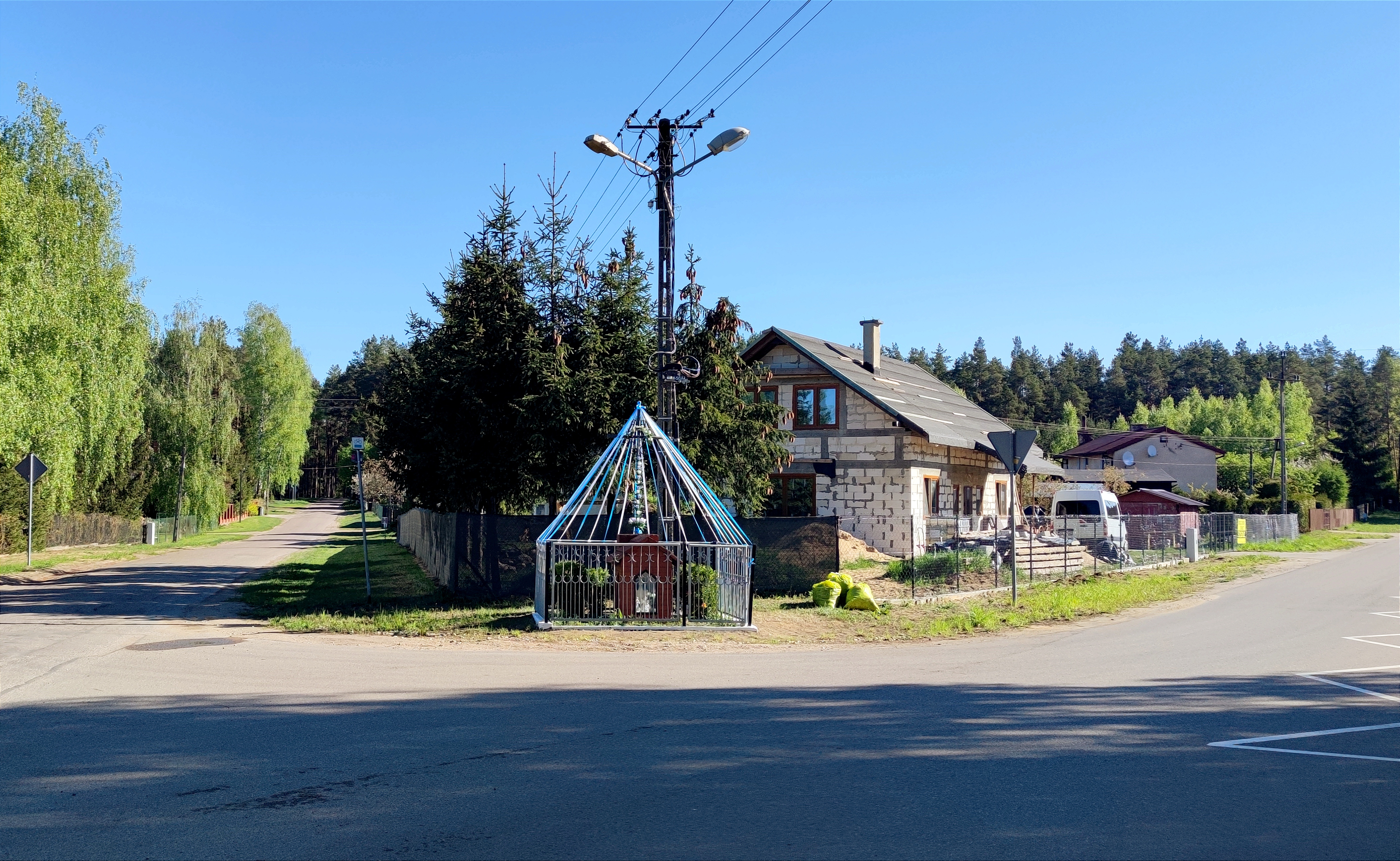
Wayside shrine in the northern part of Wąglik as seen from S

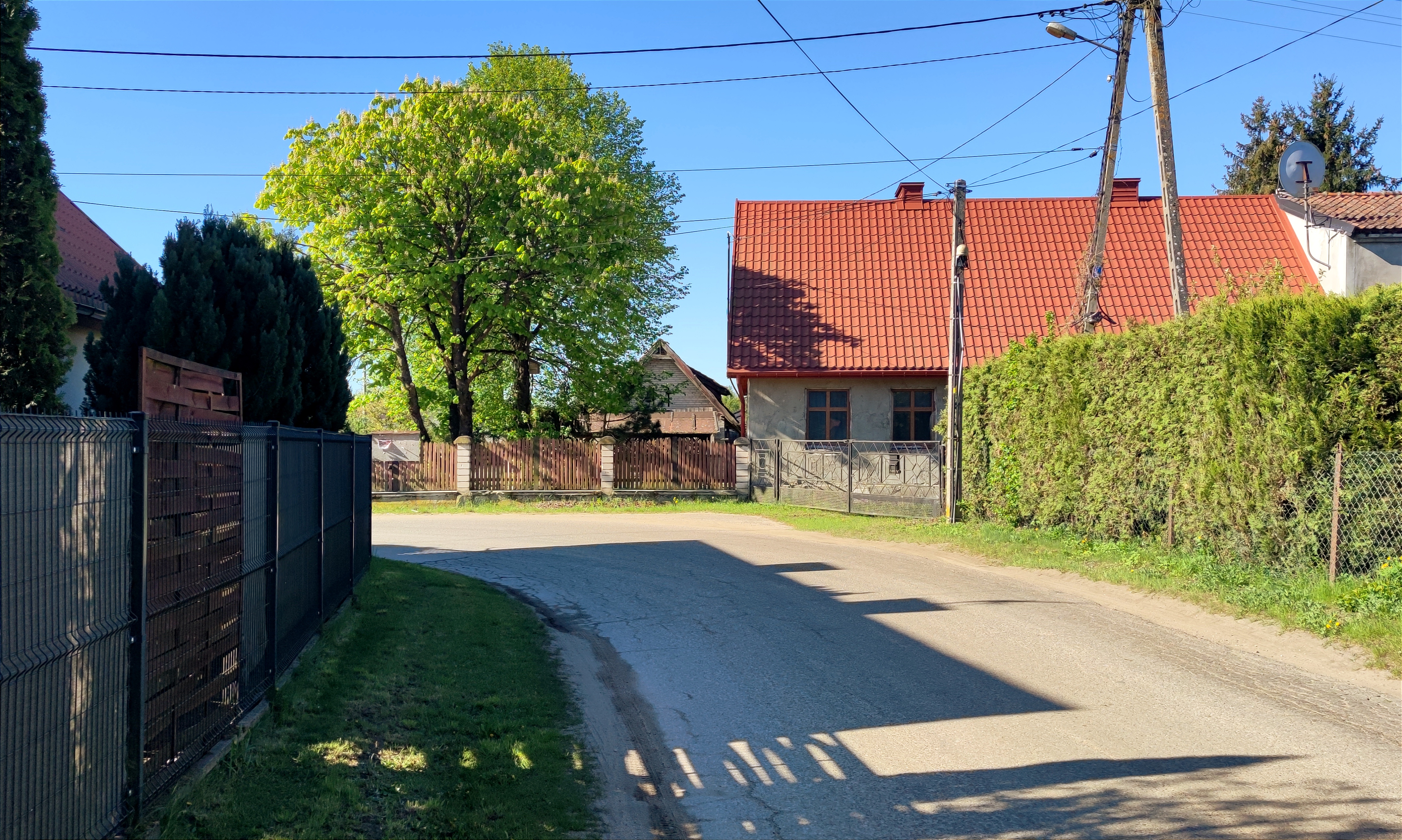
Buildings in the middle part of Wąglik as seen from N

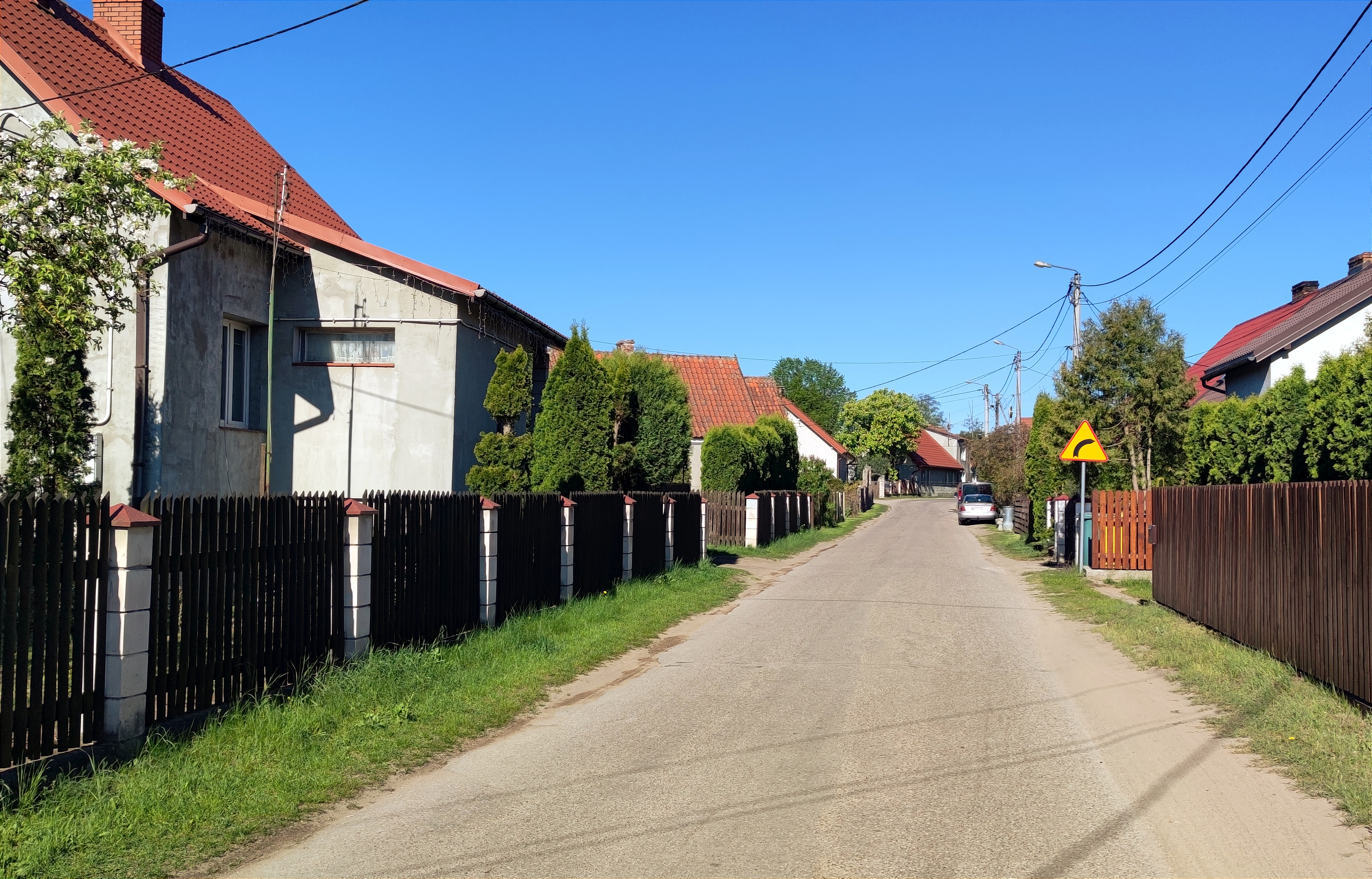
Buildings in the middle part of Wąglik as seen from E

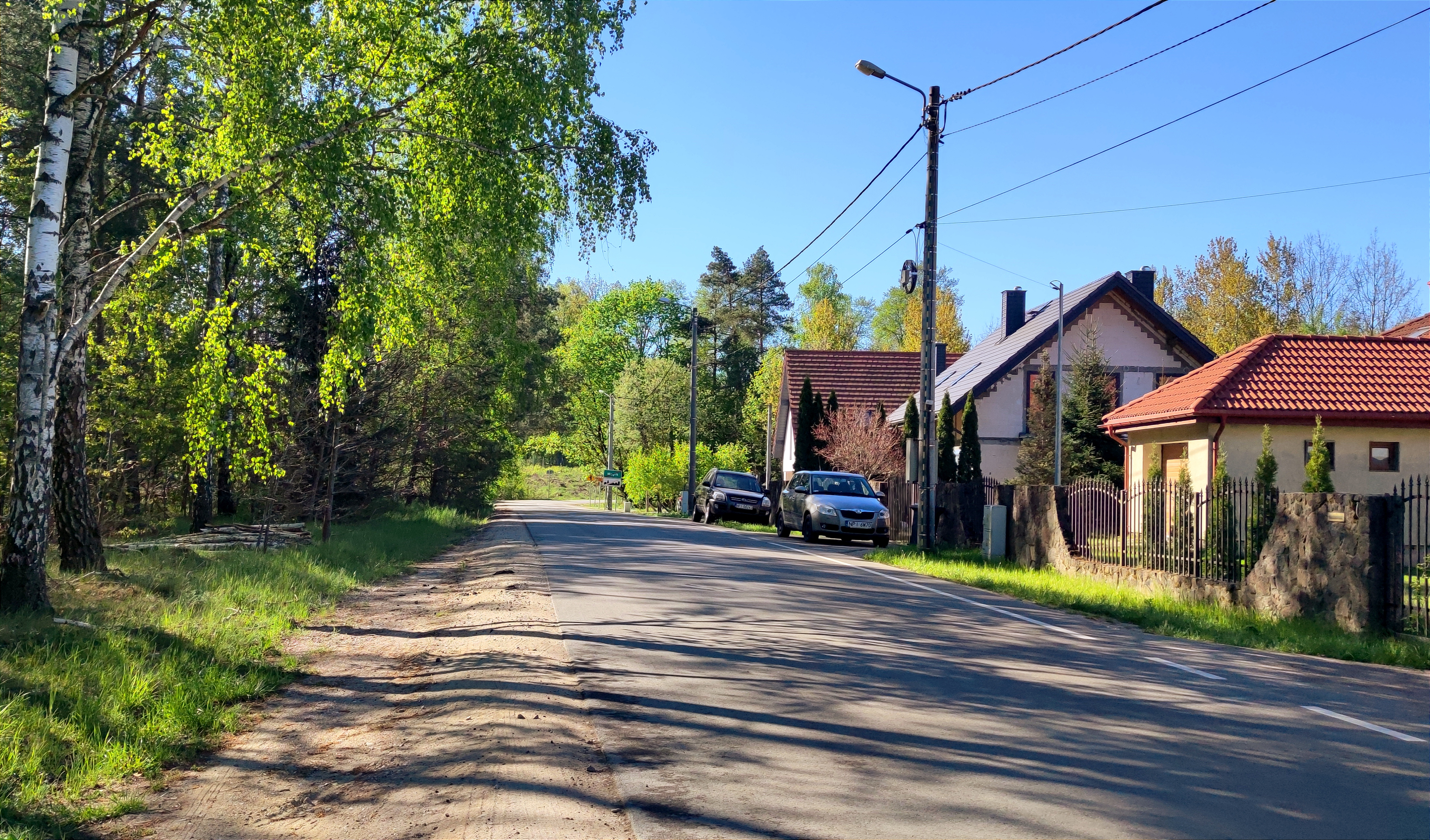
Southern border of Wąglik as seen from N

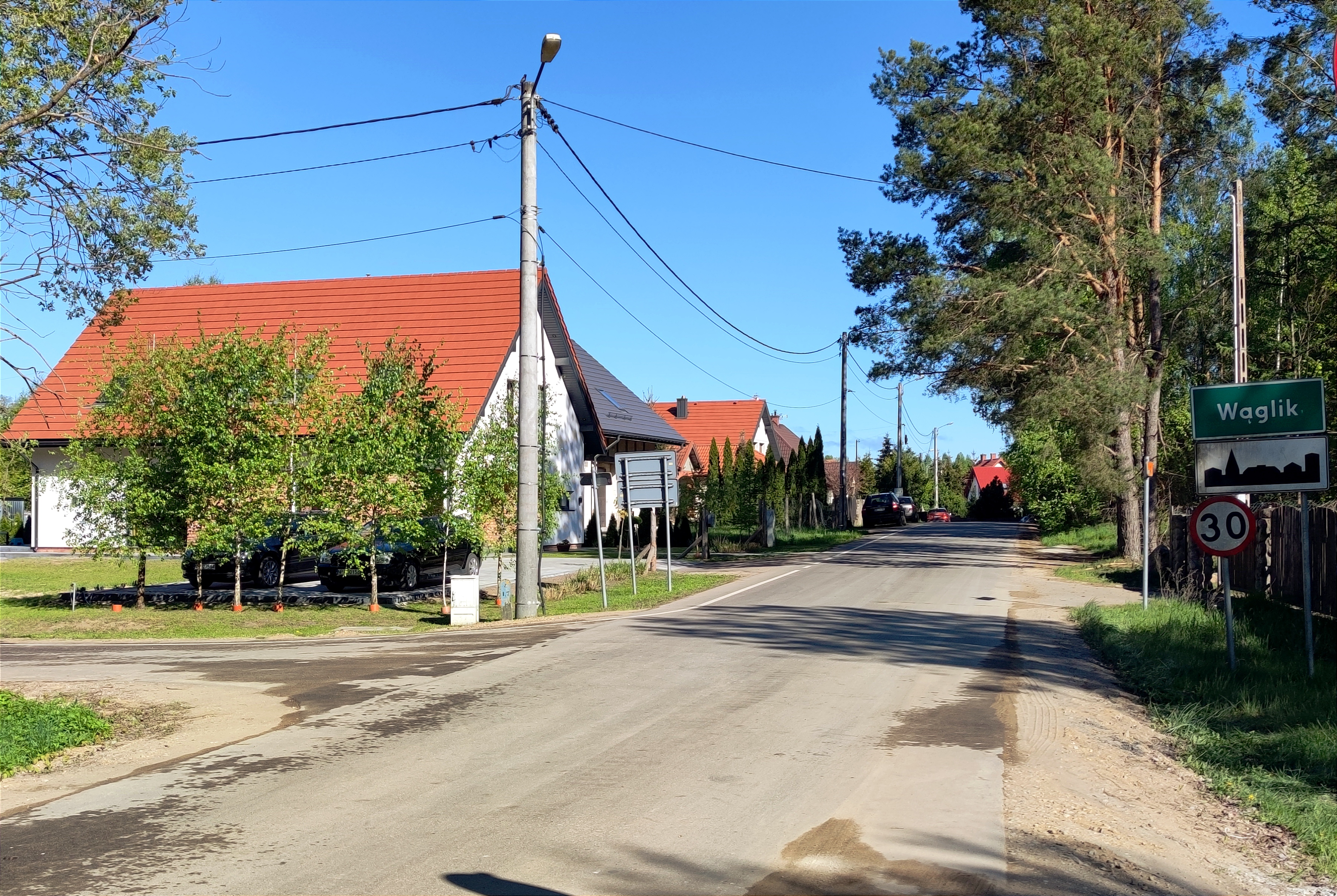
Southern border of Wąglik as seen from S
