= Szparki =

- Settlement
- Location within Poland
- Coordinates: 53°36′N 21°50′E
- Country: Poland
- Voivodeship: Warmian-Masurian
- County: Pisz
- Gmina: Pisz

Szparki [ˈʂparki] (German: Sparken) is a settlement in the administrative district of Gmina Pisz, within Pisz County, Warmian-Masurian Voivodeship, in northern Poland.
