= Jaśkowo-Leśniczówka =

- Village
- Location within Poland
- Coordinates: 53°34′39″N 21°40′29″E
- Country: Poland
- Voivodeship: Warmian-Masurian
- County: Pisz
- Gmina: Pisz

Jaśkowo-Leśniczówka (Polish pronunciation: [jaɕˈkɔvɔ lɛɕɲiˈtʂufka]) is a village in the administrative district of Gmina Pisz, within Pisz County, Warmian-Masurian Voivodeship, in northern Poland.
