= Nowe Uściany =

Settlement in Pisz County, Poland

- Settlement
- Location within Poland
- Coordinates: 53°33′N 21°41′E
- Country: Poland
- Voivodeship: Warmian-Masurian
- County: Pisz
- Gmina: Pisz

Nowe Uściany [ˈnɔvɛ uɕˈt͡ɕanɨ] is a village in the administrative district of Gmina Pisz, in Pisz County, Warmian-Masurian Voivodeship, in northern Poland.
