= Rybitwy, Warmian-Masurian Voivodeship =

Rybitwy
- Settlement
- Location within Poland
- Coordinates: 53°40′N 21°56′E
- Country: Poland
- Voivodeship: Warmian-Masurian
- County: Pisz
- Gmina: Pisz

Rybitwy [rɨˈbitfɨ] (German: Ribitten) is a settlement in the administrative district of Gmina Pisz, within Pisz County, Warmian-Masurian Voivodeship, in northern Poland.
