= Zdunowo, Warmian-Masurian Voivodeship =

Zdunowo
- Village
- Location within Poland
- Coordinates: 53°31′N 21°41′E
- Country: Poland
- Voivodeship: Warmian-Masurian
- County: Pisz
- Gmina: Pisz

Zdunowo [zduˈnɔvɔ] (German: Sadunen) is a village in the administrative district of Gmina Pisz, within Pisz County, Warmian-Masurian Voivodeship, in northern Poland.
