= Kulik, Warmian-Masurian Voivodeship =

Kulik
- Settlement
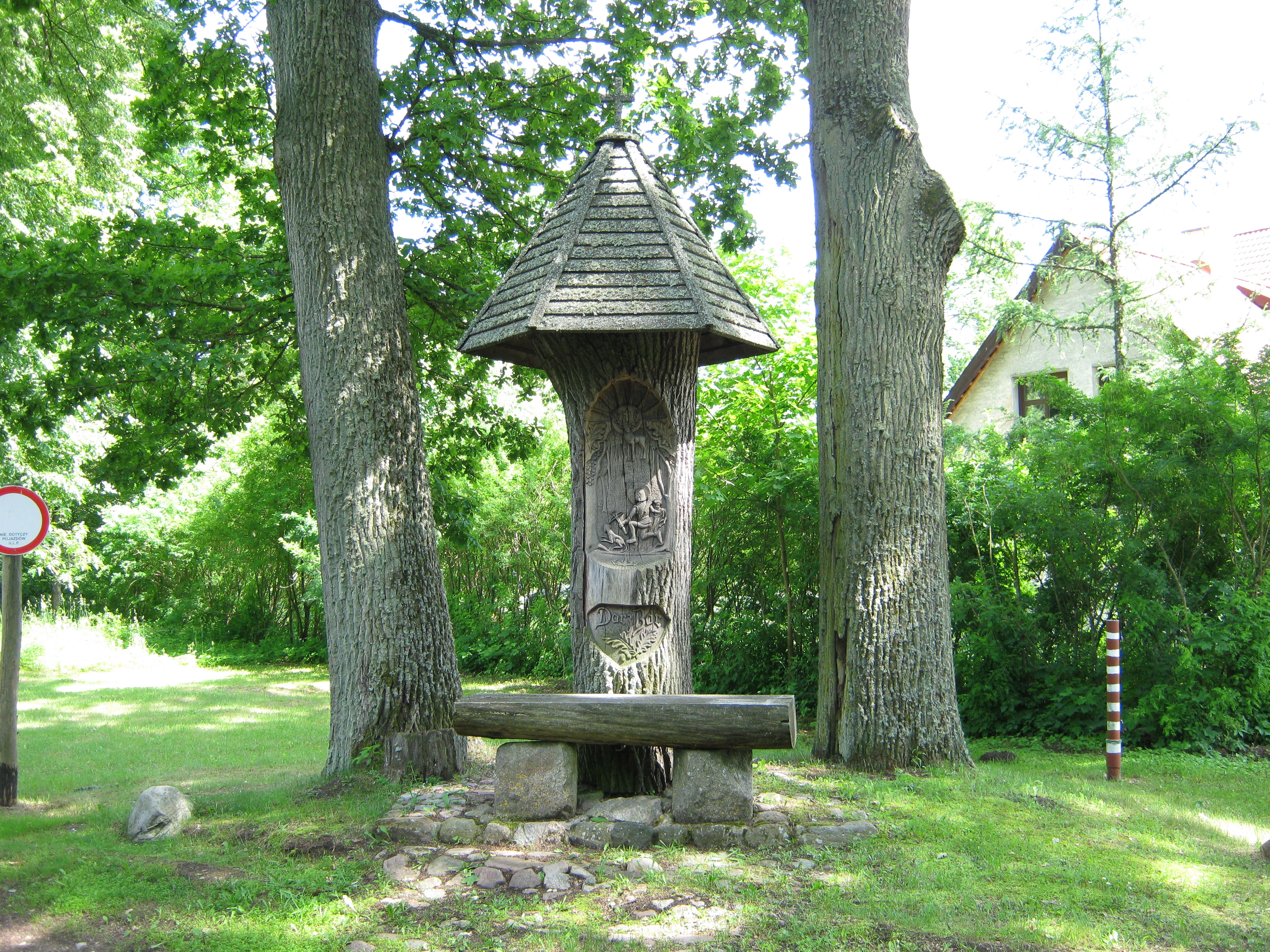

- Location within Poland
- Coordinates: 53°33′43″N 21°42′45″E
- Country: Poland
- Voivodeship: Warmian-Masurian
- County: Pisz
- Gmina: Pisz
- Time zone: UTC+01:00 (CET)
  - Summer (DST): UTC+02:00 (CEST)

Kulik [ˈkulik] is a settlement in the administrative district of Gmina Pisz, within Pisz County, Warmian-Masurian Voivodeship, in northern Poland. Kulik has an area of 8 km^{2} (3.1 sq mi). As of 2011 its population is 250 with a density of 31.25/km^{2} (80.9/sq mi). 48% of the population is male while 52% is female.
