= Pogobie Tylne =

- Village
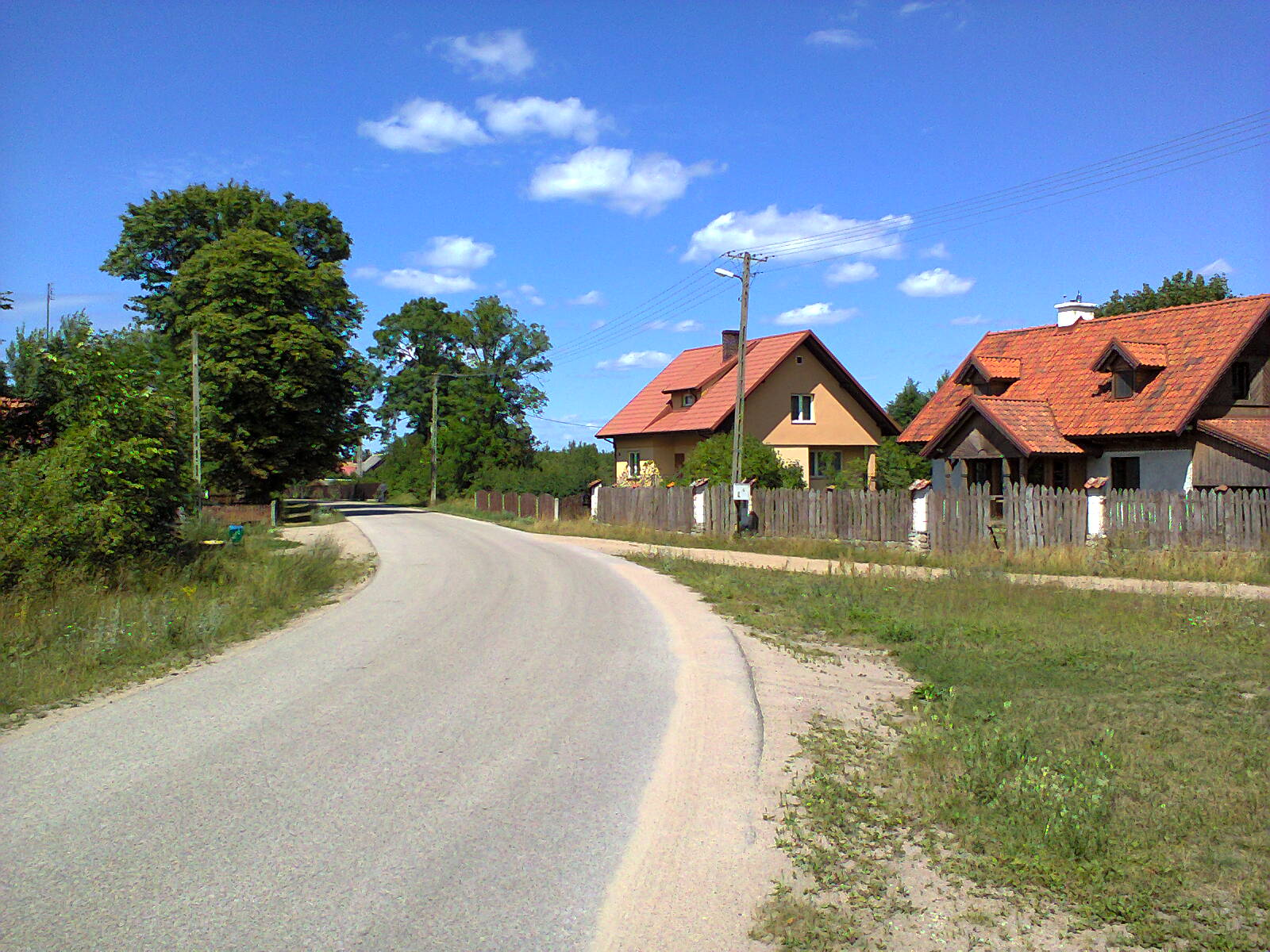
- Street of Pogobie Tylne

- Location within Poland
- Coordinates: 53°31′45″N 21°44′50″E
- Country: Poland
- Voivodeship: Warmian-Masurian
- County: Pisz
- Gmina: Pisz
- Time zone: UTC+01:00 (CET)
  - Summer (DST): UTC+02:00 (CEST)

Pogobie Tylne [pɔˈɡɔbjɛ ˈtɨlnɛ] (German: Hinter Pogobien) is a village in the administrative district of Gmina Pisz, within Pisz County, Warmian-Masurian Voivodeship, in northern Poland.

It was called Hirschwalde from 1933–1945. (East Prussia).
