= Rostki, Pisz County =

Rostki
- Village
- Location within Poland
- Coordinates: 53°42′07″N 21°54′05″E
- Country: Poland
- Voivodeship: Warmian-Masurian
- County: Pisz
- Gmina: Pisz
- Time zone: UTC+1 (CET)
  - Summer (DST): UTC+2 (CEST)
- Vehicle registration: NPI

Rostki [ˈrɔstki] is a village in the administrative district of Gmina Pisz, within Pisz County, Warmian-Masurian Voivodeship, in north-eastern Poland. It is located in Masuria.

Two Polish citizens were murdered by Nazi Germany in the village during World War II.
