= Kwik =

- Village
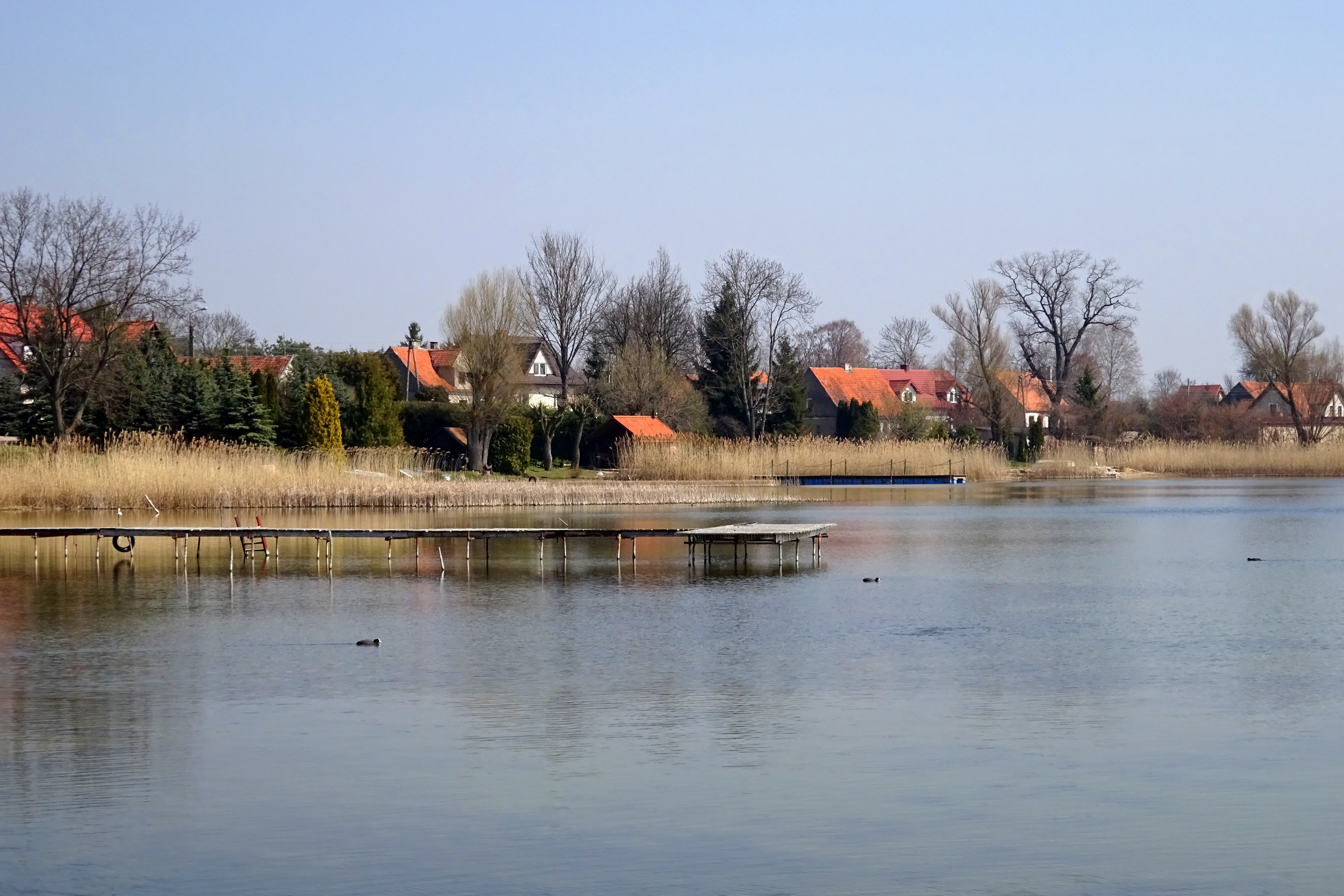
- View of Kwik from Lake Białoławki

- Location within Poland
- Coordinates: 53°44′N 21°49′E
- Country: Poland
- Voivodeship: Warmian-Masurian
- County: Pisz
- Gmina: Pisz
- Founded: 15th century
- Population (approx.): 130
- Time zone: UTC+1 (CET)
  - Summer (DST): UTC+2 (CEST)
- Vehicle registration: NPI

Kwik [kfik] is a village in the administrative district of Gmina Pisz, within Pisz County, Warmian-Masurian Voivodeship, in northern Poland. It is located on Lake Białoławki in the region of Masuria.

== History ==
The village was founded in the 15th century. In the late 19th century, it had an entirely Polish population of 304, which was mostly employed in agriculture, fishing and fish trade.
