= Gmina Pisz =

Gmina Pisz Pisz Commune
- Gmina
- Coat of arms
- Interactive map of Gmina Pisz
- Coordinates (Pisz): 53°37′N 21°48′E
- Country: Poland
- Voivodeship: Warmian-Masurian
- County: Pisz
- Seat: Pisz

Area
  - Total: 634.8 km^{2} (245.1 sq mi)

Population (2006)
  - Total: 27,224
  - Density: 42.89/km^{2} (111.1/sq mi)
  - Urban: 19,332
  - Rural: 7,892
- Website: https://www.pisz.pl/

Gmina Pisz is an urban-rural gmina (administrative district) in Pisz County, Warmian-Masurian Voivodeship, in northern Poland. Its seat is the town of Pisz, which lies approximately 88 kilometres (55 mi) east of the regional capital Olsztyn.

The gmina covers an area of 634.8 square kilometres (245.1 sq mi), and as of 2006 its total population is 27,224 (out of which the population of Pisz amounts to 19,332, and the population of the rural part of the gmina is 7,892).

The gmina contains part of the protected area called Masurian Landscape Park.

== Villages ==
Apart from the town of Pisz, Gmina Pisz contains the villages and settlements of Anuszewo, Babrosty, Bogumiły, Borki, Ciesina, Czarny Róg, Dziadki, Hejdyk, Imionek, Jabłoń, Jagodne, Jaśkowo, Jaśkowo-Leśniczówka, Jeglin, Jeże, Karpa, Karwik, Kocioł, Kocioł Duży, Kociołek Szlachecki, Kulik, Kwik, Lipa Przednia, Lipa Tylna, Lisie Jamy, Liski, Łupki, Łysonie, Maldanin, Maszty, Niedźwiedzie, Nowe Uściany, Pietrzyki, Pilchy, Piskorzewo, Pogobie Średnie, Pogobie Tylne, Rakowo Piskie, Rostki, Rybitwy, Snopki, Stare Guty, Stare Uściany, Szczechy Małe, Szczechy Wielkie, Szeroki Bór Piski, Szparki, Trzonki, Turośl, Turowo, Turowo Duże, Wądołek, Wąglik, Wąglik-Kolonia, Wiartel, Wiartel Mały, Wielki Las, Zaroślak, Zawady, Zdory, Zdunowo and Zimna.

== Neighbouring gminas ==
Gmina Pisz is bordered by the gminas of Biała Piska, Kolno, Łyse, Mikołajki, Orzysz, Rozogi, Ruciane-Nida and Turośl.
