= Zdunowo, Szczecin =

Neighbourhood of Szczecin, Poland

Coordinates: 53°22′N 14°45′E

Zdunowo (German: Hohenkrug) is a village that is part of the Szczecin City, Poland situated on the right bank of Oder river, east of the Szczecin Old Town, and Szczecin-Dąbie.

== History ==
In June 2025, the village was temporarily evacuated when unexploded ordnance from the Second World War was found.

In 2024, a new route for the S10 road was announced, connecting the village with the city.
