= Pogobie Średnie =

- Village
- Location within Poland
- Coordinates: 53°33′26″N 21°45′50″E
- Country: Poland
- Voivodeship: Warmian-Masurian
- County: Pisz
- Gmina: Pisz

Pogobie Średnie [pɔˈɡɔbjɛ ˈɕrɛdɲɛ] (German: Mittel Pogobien) is a village in the administrative district of Gmina Pisz, within Pisz County, Warmian-Masurian Voivodeship, in northern Poland. The village is located on the shore of the Pogubie Wielkie Lake.
