= Szczechy Małe =

- Village
- Location within Poland
- Coordinates: 53°42′N 21°52′E
- Country: Poland
- Voivodeship: Warmian-Masurian
- County: Pisz
- Gmina: Pisz

Szczechy Małe [ˈʂt͡ʂɛxɨ ˈmawɛ] (German: Klein Zechen) is a village in the administrative district of Gmina Pisz, within Pisz County, Warmian-Masurian Voivodeship, in northern Poland.

== Notable residents ==
- Wilhelm Joswig (1912–1989), Luftwaffe officer
