= Milford Theatre (Chicago) =

Coordinates: 41.9413°N 87.7271°W

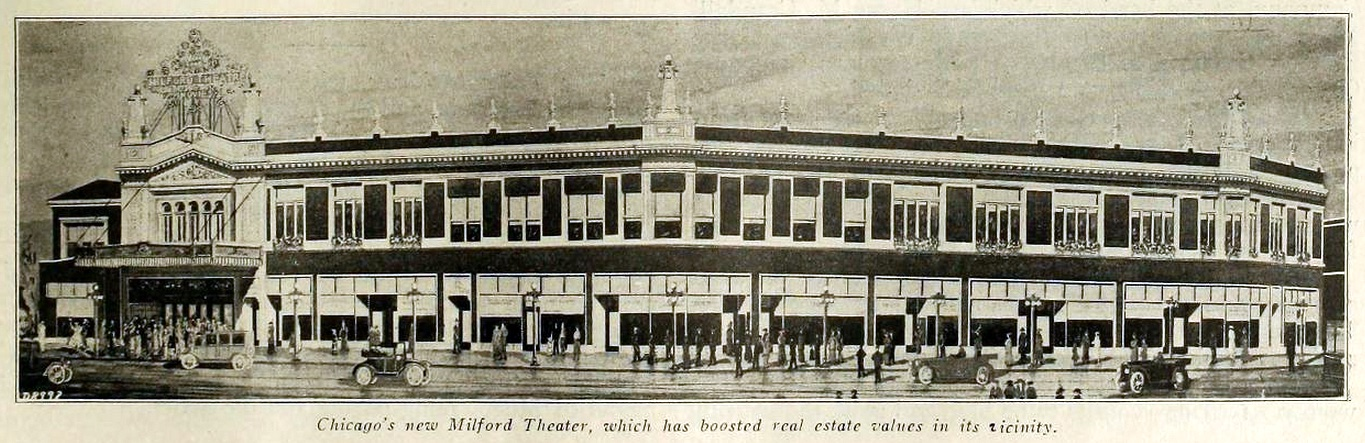
Milford Theatre, 1917

The Milford Theatre was a movie palace located at 3311 N. Pulaski Road (originally Crawford Avenue), in the Avondale neighborhood of Chicago. Constructed in 1917, like the Portage Theater, it was designed by Henry L. Newhouse and opened for the Ascher Brothers circuit.

The theatre had 1,150 seats, no balcony and a single screen. Because of the area's large Polish population, a significant share of the screenings were Polish films, drawing even street photographer Vivian Maier. When not screening Polish films, the Milford showed Hollywood productions at extremely low ticket prices, charging only 60 cents for admission deep into the 1970s.

On February 27, 1981, famed Polish singer and guitarist Krzysztof Klenczon was seriously injured by a drunk driver in Chicago, en route from the Milford Ballroom that was part of the complex. Klenczon died on April 7 at St. Joseph's Hospital in Chicago, and was buried July 25, 1981, in his family's plot in Szczytno, Poland.

The theater remained open until 1990, and was demolished four years later after a fire.
