= Jerzy Kossela =

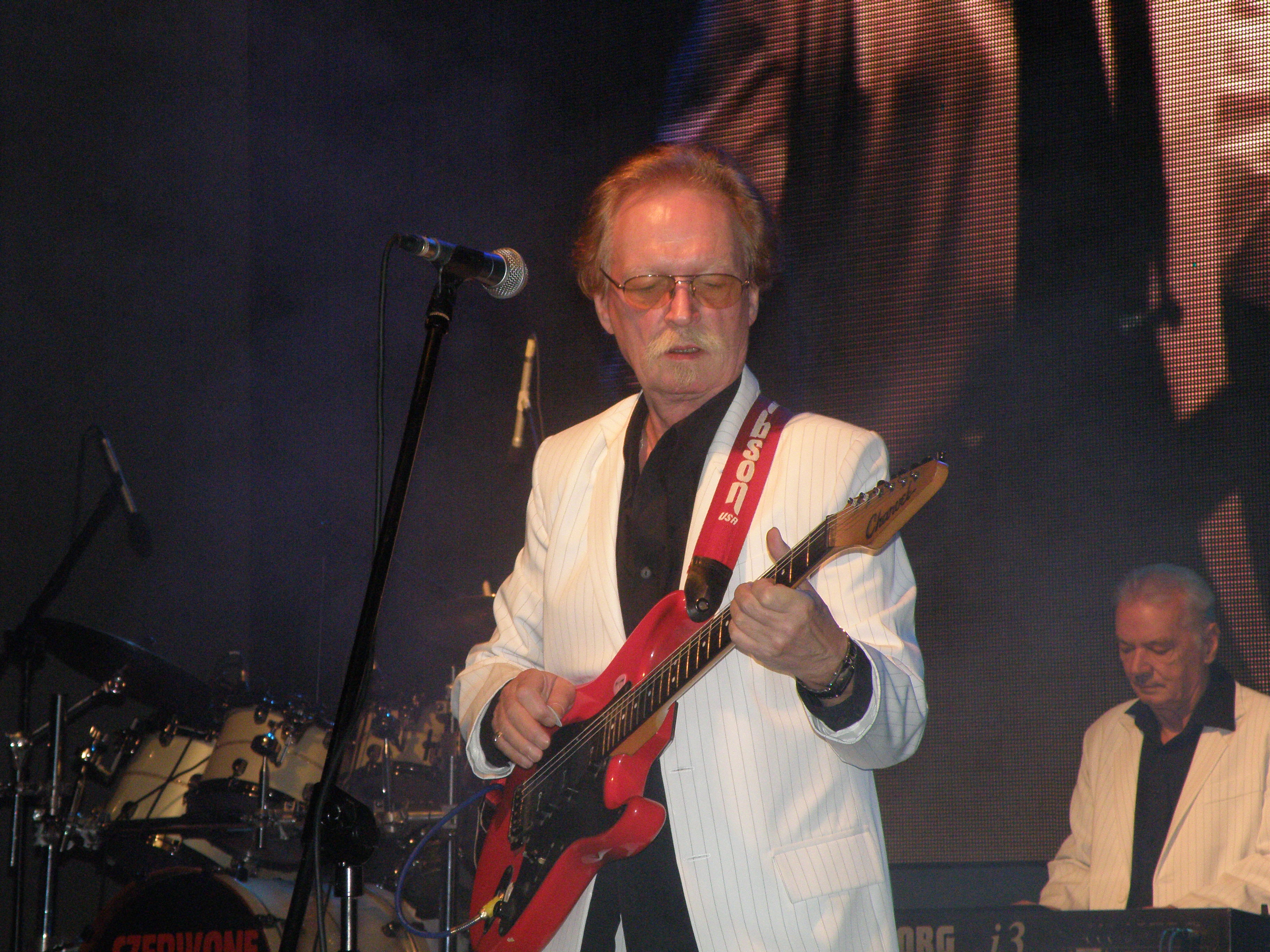
- Jerzy Kossela with Czerwone Gitary (27 November 2009)

Background information
- Born: Jerzy Kosela; 15 July 1942; Częstochowa, General Government, present day – Poland
- Died: 7 January 2017 (aged 74) Gdynia, Poland
- Genre: big beat
- Instrument: guitar
- Years active: 1962–2017

Jerzy Kossela (né Kosela; 15 July 1942 – 7 January 2017) was a Polish guitarist, vocalist and founding member of the bands Electron, Niebiesko-Czarni, Pięciolinie and Czerwone Gitary.

He was the first founding member of the band Czerwone Gitary, during 1965–1967. Following his departure from the band, he continued to remain active in Polish music and performed on stage until 1976 after which he would then spend 15 years as a music presenter. Upon the band's reunion in 1991, he once again became its guitarist and singer.

In 1993, he left the band again due to a conflict with former band founder, Seweryn Krajewski. By 1999, Kossela had rejoined Czerwone Gitary again. He composed such hits as "Bo ty się boisz myszy" (music and lyrics), "Historia jednej znajomości", "Matura" (lyrics to the music of Krzysztof Klenczon). He co-authored the book Czerwone Gitary to właśnie my! On the Czerwone Gitary's album Jeszcze raz (One More Time), which debuted 14 March 2015, the song "Kocham dwie dziewczyny" appeared, originally written in 1965.

From May 2015 he stopped performing in concerts with the band Czerwone Gitary, citing health reasons.

== Personal life ==
Kossela was married to Janina Karst. In 2010 he received the Medal for Merit to Culture – Gloria Artis.

Kossela died in Gdynia on 7 January 2017, aged 74.
