= Julie Salinger =

German politician (1863–1942)

Constitutional assembly of the Free State of Saxony
- In office 1919–1920

Member of the People's Chamber of Saxony
- In office 1920–1922

Personal details
- Born: Julie Braun; 31 July 1863 Ortelsburg, East Prussia (Szczytno, Poland)
- Died: 16 September 1942 (aged 79) Theresienstadt Ghetto
- Party: German Democratic Party
- Spouse: Julius Israel Salinger (1855–1921)
- Children: Paul Salinger (1887–1933)

Julie Salinger, née Braun (31 July 1863 – 16 September 1942) was a German liberal politician and one of the first female members of the parliament of Saxony.

== Biography ==
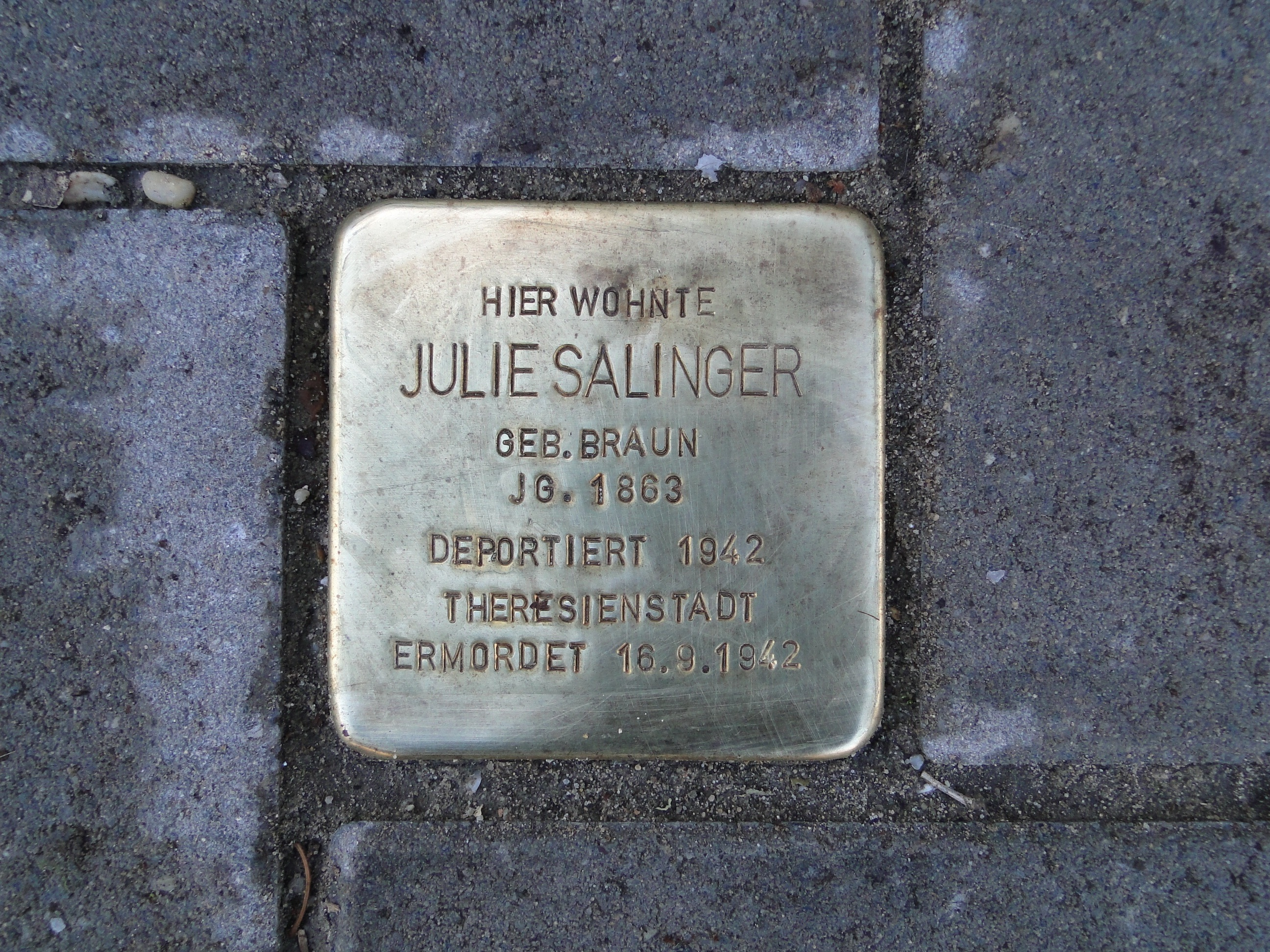
Julie Salinger's Stolperstein in Dresden, Bayreuther Strasse 14

Salinger was born Julie Braun in Ortelsburg, East Prussia (Szczytno). She married Julius Israel Salinger, a lawyer (1855–1921), in 1886, and her son Paul was born in 1887. About 1897 the family moved to Dresden, Saxony where Salinger started to engage in the Jewish community and the local women's movement.

Throughout World War I Salinger worked in the Central Committee for the wartime organization of Dresden associations (Zentralausschuss der Kriegsorganisation Dresdner Vereine), which organized public social aid in Dresden. In 1918 she was a co-founding member of the German Democratic Party (DDP) in Dresden and was elected as one out of three female members of the constitutional assembly of the Free State of Saxony on 2 February 1919.

Salinger became a member of the Saxon parliament upon the elections of 14 November 1920 until the legislative period ended in 1922. Salinger remained an active member of the Bund Deutscher Frauenvereine in the 1920s.

In 1940 she was forced to move into a Judenhaus in Dresden from where she was deported to Theresienstadt Ghetto on 25 August 1942. Salinger died in Theresienstadt on 16 September 1942.

== Remembrance ==
Since 2012 a Stolperstein remembers Salinger in front of her former residence at Bayreuther Straße 14, Dresden. A street in Dresdner Neustadt is named in her honour.
