= Jerome Soltan =

American architect

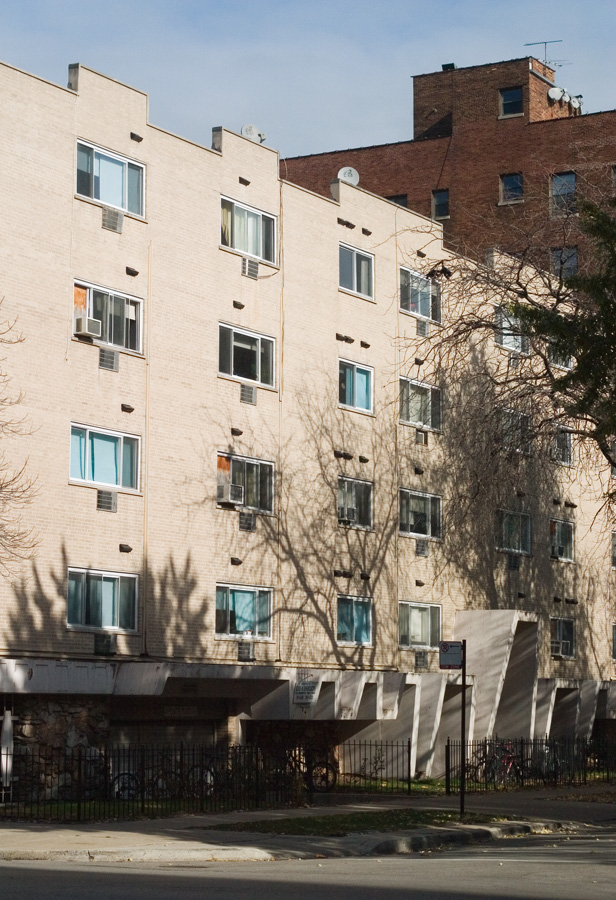
5101 N. Sheridan, a typical Four Plus One

Jerome Soltan (September 16, 1929 – December 15, 2010) was an American architect who designed residential, commercial, and religious buildings primarily on Chicago's North Side and north suburbs. He is most well known as the originator of the Four Plus One, an apartment building type consisting of four stories above parking.

Soltan graduated from the University of Illinois in 1952, after which he worked as a draftsman for Henry L. Newhouse and Karl Newhouse before opening his own firm in 1955. Some of his notable works include the Skokie Valley Traditional Synagogue, Mission Hills Country Club (Northbrook), 7247 N. Western, 2640 W. Touhy, and 6611 N. Sheridan.

Soltan was married to his wife Renee and together they raised three daughters; Cherie, Michele and Suzie. Soltan also had six grandkids, and enjoyed playing gin rummy and golf.
