= Hansjoachim Linde =

German officer (1926–2020)

- Born: 6 April 1926; Ortelsburg, East Prussia, Weimar Germany (Szczytno, Poland)
- Died: 12 February 2020 (aged 93); Mönchengladbach, Germany
- Military career
- Allegiance: West Germany
- Service years: 1957–1986
- Rank: Generaloberstabsarzt

Hansjoachim Linde (6 April 1926 – 12 February 2020) was a German Generaloberstabsarzt and inspector general of the medical troops from 1982 to 1986.

Hansjoachim Linde was born in Ortelsburg, East Prussia (Szczytno, Poland). He served in World War II and returned to Germany from Soviet captivity in 1946. Linde studied medicine at the University of Marburg and in Innsbruck and worked as a surgical assistant. He joined the West German Bundeswehr in 1957.

From 1971 to 1974 he was a consultant for leadership and planning at the Federal Ministry of Defense (Germany). In 1982 he was promoted to Generaloberstabsarzt and became inspector general of the medical and health system. In addition to his work in military medicine he was active in the German Red Cross. Linde died in Mönchengladbach.

== Awards ==
- Order of Merit of the Federal Republic of Germany (1983)
- Großes Bundesverdienstkreuz mit Stern des Verdienstordens der Bundesrepublik Deutschland (1987)
- German Red Cross award (1987)
- Order of the Holy Sepulchre
