= Sutherland Hotel =

- U.S. National Register of Historic Places
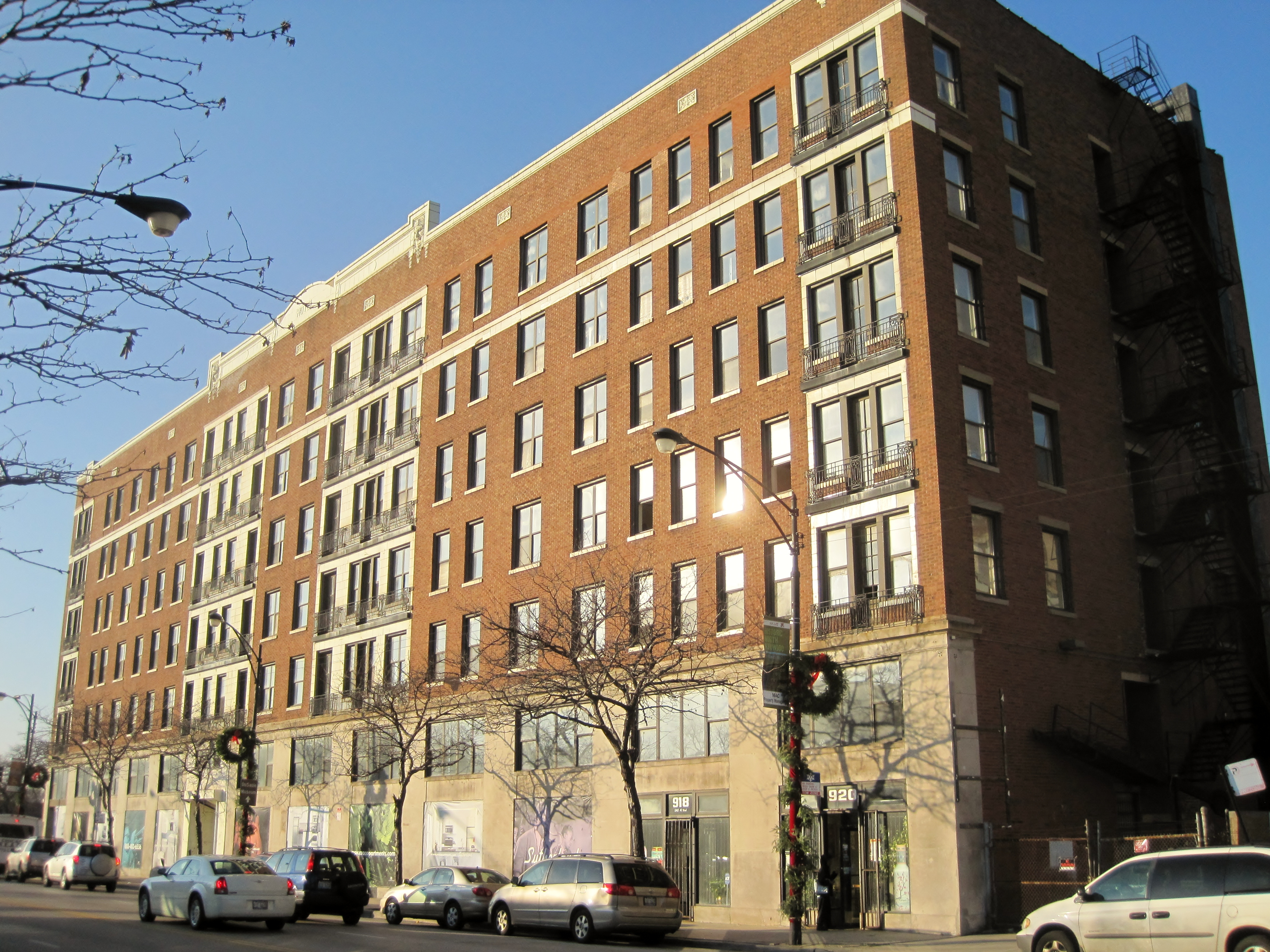

- Location within Chicago
- Location: 4659 S. Drexel Blvd., Chicago, Illinois
- Coordinates: 41°48′35″N 87°36′12″W
- Built: 1919
- Architect: Henry L. Newhouse
- Architectural style: Classical Revival
- NRHP reference No.: 11000243
- Added to NRHP: May 4, 2011

The Sutherland Hotel, originally built to be the Cooper–Monatah Hotel, is a historic building in the Kenwood neighborhood of Chicago, Illinois. Built as a high-end hotel, the Sutherland was commandeered by the US government as a military hospital before it was completed. Finally opened as a hotel in 1925, the building later became famous for its Sutherland Lounge, a popular venue for Chicago's jazz scene.

== History ==
Kenwood, Chicago was an upper-class residential community in the early 20th century. The connection of mass transit lines in the early 1900s fostered an era of large-scale development. Sherman T. Cooper was among these developers, and eyed a high-class hotel at the northeast corner of 47th Street and Drexel Boulevard. Cooper commissioned architect Henry L. Newhouse, who specialized in commercial buildings, to design the hotel. The original plan called for a six-story building with 236 bedrooms.

Shortly before construction began in late 1917, the United States entered World War I. The next year, the partially completed building was commandeered by the government as a military hospital. At the time, the exterior was complete, but there were no finished floors, heating, plumbing, or lighting. The commission in charge of the facility assumed responsibility for finishing it, implementing only necessary changes instead of the intended decorations. The building was completed in January 1919 and was commissioned as General Hospital #32. It was decommissioned only a few months later in May. It was then assigned to the United States Public Health Service in 1920, which operated for another five years.

In 1925, a real estate consortium purchased the hotel building. They named their acquisition The Sutherland after partner William J. Sutherland, president of the Mooney, Borland, Sutherland Corporation intelligence bureau. They rehabilitated the building into an apartment hotel with small additions for commercial space. It maintained this role through the late 1940s.

Following the Supreme Court ruling in Shelley v. Kraemer, banning restrictive real estate covenants, middle-class black families moved to the north Kenwood area. Ostracized from white communities, neighborhoods like Kenwood fostered the Chicago Black Renaissance, a surge of black artistic expression. Typical of the era, the Sutherland refused to serve black clientele. However, a change of ownership to Maxwell Rubin, Lee Gould, and Samuel Cohen in the early 1950s resulting in the building's 1952 integration. The new owners invested in a rehabilitation in an era where other white businessmen were abandoning the neighborhood. They placed Earl Clark Ormes, a black businessman who had worked for the Supreme Life Insurance Company, as its manager.

Ormes became the face of the Sutherland as it catered to black clientele, advertising it as "The Southside's Most Progressive Hotel." Jazz music enjoyed a revival in the area of the 1950s, and several venues opened to cater to its popularity, including the Savoy Ballroom, the Regal Theater, the Palm Tavern, and the Parkway Ballroom. In 1956, the Sutherland began to advertise the "Sutherland Lounge," a venue advertised as the place "Where the Stars and Celebrities Meet." Larry Smith broadcast live shows and interviews from the hotel. Performers included Thelonious Monk, John Coltrane, Louis Armstrong, and Miles Davis.

In 1963, the lounge closed, ostensibly for repairs. It briefly opened in 1964, but closed that February. The lounge area was occasionally used for entertainment performances in the following years, but its role as an influential jazz spot ended. Also in 1963, a group led by four alderman established a civil rights division of the Coordinating Council of Community Organizations and used the Sutherland as its headquarters. There, the division met with residents to discuss civil rights issues.

Dilapidated, the Sutherland closed in 1982. Seven years later, the building was purchased and converted to affordable housing by Travelers & Immigrants Aid and the Oakwood Development Corporation. The Sutherland is now one of the few buildings remaining in Kenwood that reflect its jazz heritage. The Palm Tavern at 446 E. 47th Street is the only other similar building. For its role in Chicago's jazz history, the Sutherland was recognized by the National Park Service with a listing on the National Register of Historic Places on May 4, 2011.
