= Blackstone-State Theater =

- U.S. National Register of Historic Places
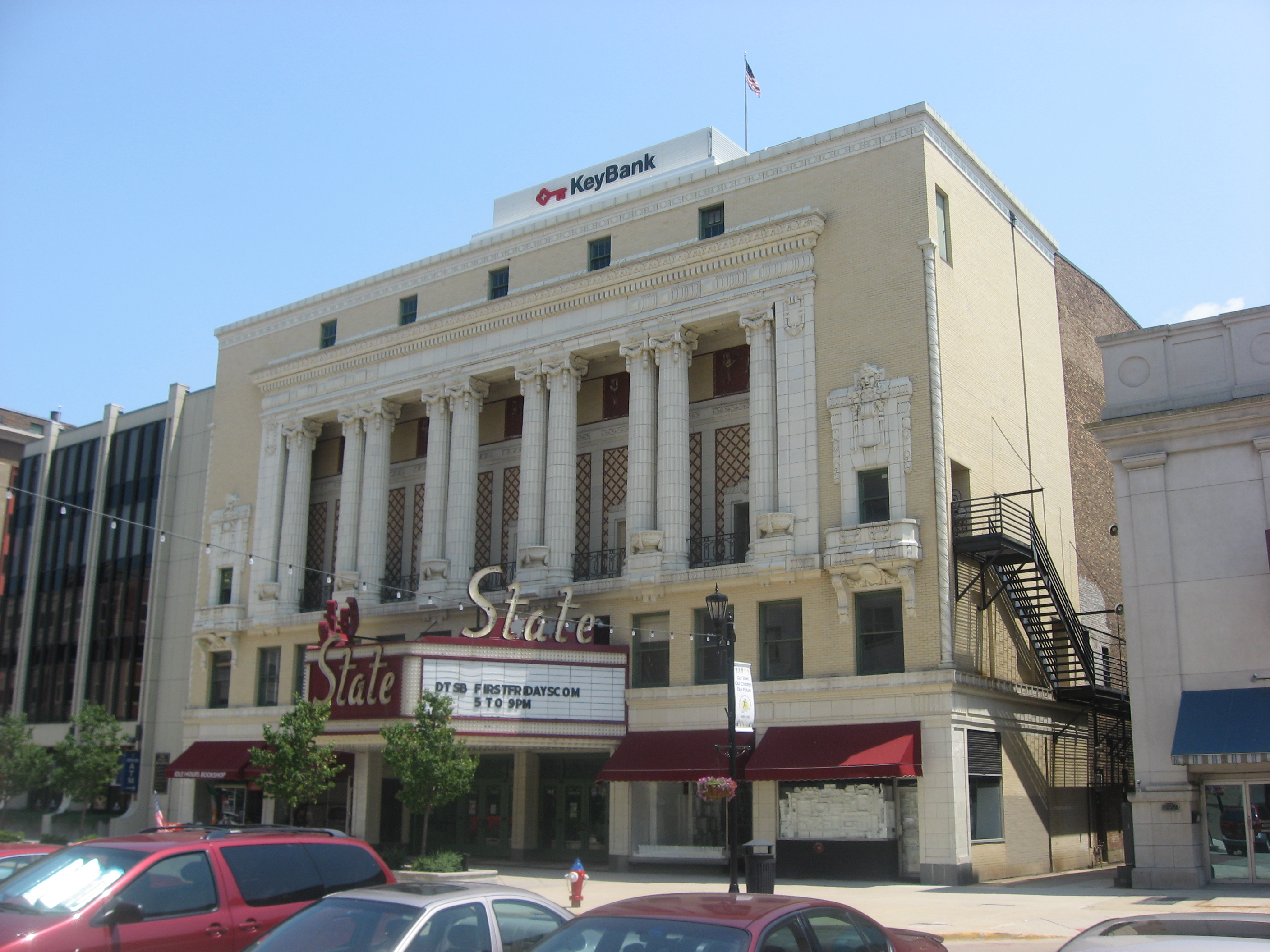
- Blackstone-State Theater, July 2012

- Location within Indiana Location within the United States
- Location: 212 S. Michigan, South Bend, Indiana
- Coordinates: 41°40′28″N 86°15′0″W
- Area: less than one acre
- Built: 1919
- Architect: Henry L. Newhouse
- Architectural style: Classical Revival
- MPS: Downtown South Bend Historic MRA
- NRHP reference No.: 85001204
- Added to NRHP: June 5, 1985

Blackstone-State Theater is a historic theater building located at South Bend, Indiana. It was built in 1919, and is a four-story, Classical Revival style brick and terra cotta building. The first floor has four storefronts and the theater entrance. The upper floors form a loggia that rises to the fourth floor and supported by four pairs of fluted columns. The theater originally sat 2,500 patrons.

The theater was closed between 1977 and 1994, and it closed again in 2016. In 2025 the South Bend Redevelopment Commission bought the theater, performed improvements, and put it up for bid.

It was listed on the National Register of Historic Places in 1985.
