= Chicago Defender Building =

Building in Chicago, Illinois, US

Coordinates: 41.8319°N 87.6215°W

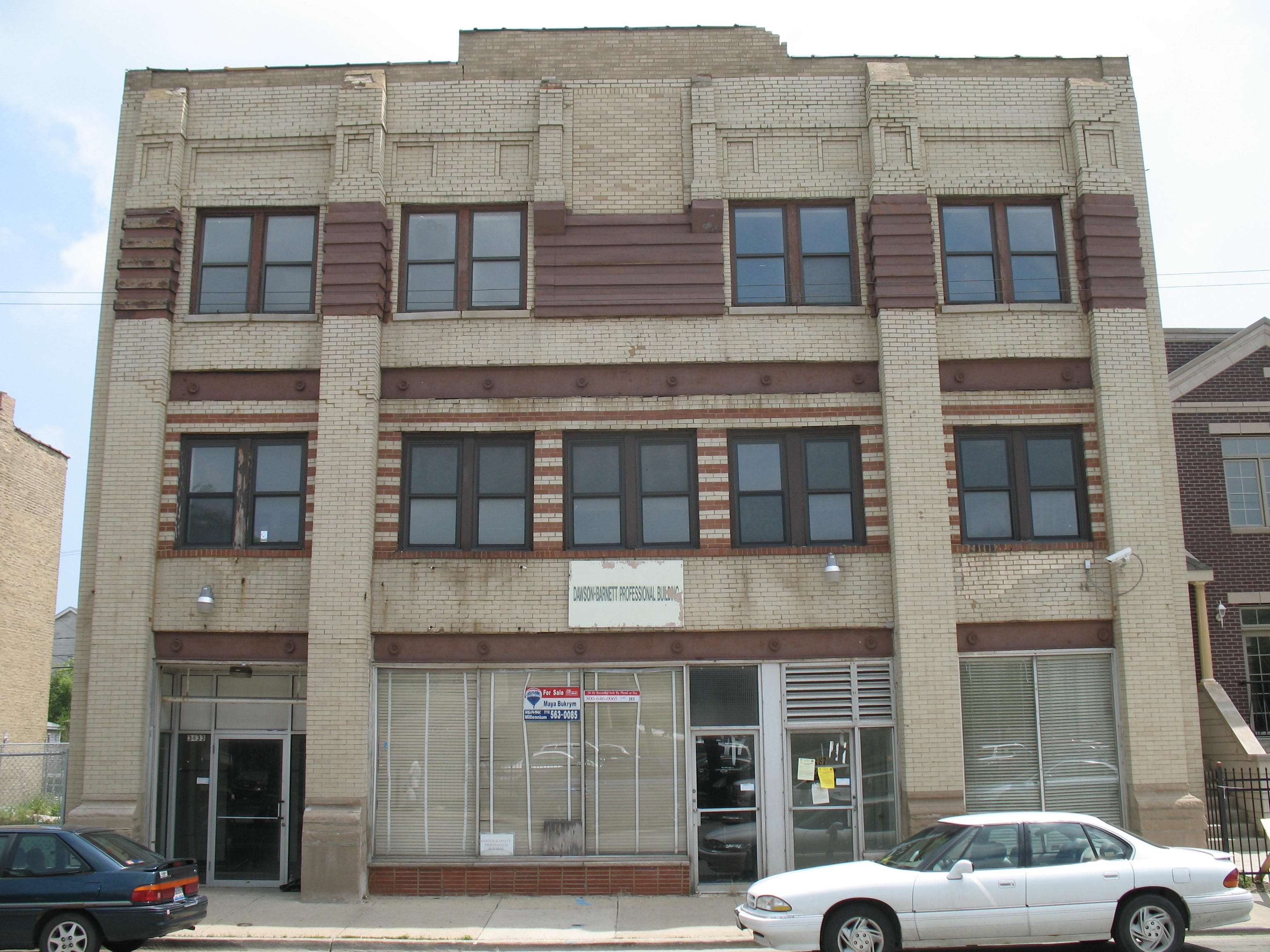
Chicago Defender Building

The Chicago Defender Building, located at 3435 S. Indiana Avenue in the Black Metropolis-Bronzeville District of the Douglas community area of Chicago, Illinois, housed the Chicago Defender from 1920 until 1960. Designed by Henry L. Newhouse, it was originally a synagogue. The building was designated a Chicago Landmark on September 9, 1998.

== History and building relocations ==
The Chicago Defender's founder Robert Sengstack Abbott was an American lawyer, newspaper publisher, and editor. The defender found many homes during its time as a nationally recognized publication, including locations at 3159 S. State St, the 2400 S. Michigan Ave. location, and 4445 S. Martin Luther King Jr. Dr location. The Defender's landmark location at 3435 S. Indiana Avenue reaffirmed the newspaper as a prominent contributor to the Black metropolis of Chicago.

== Gallery ==
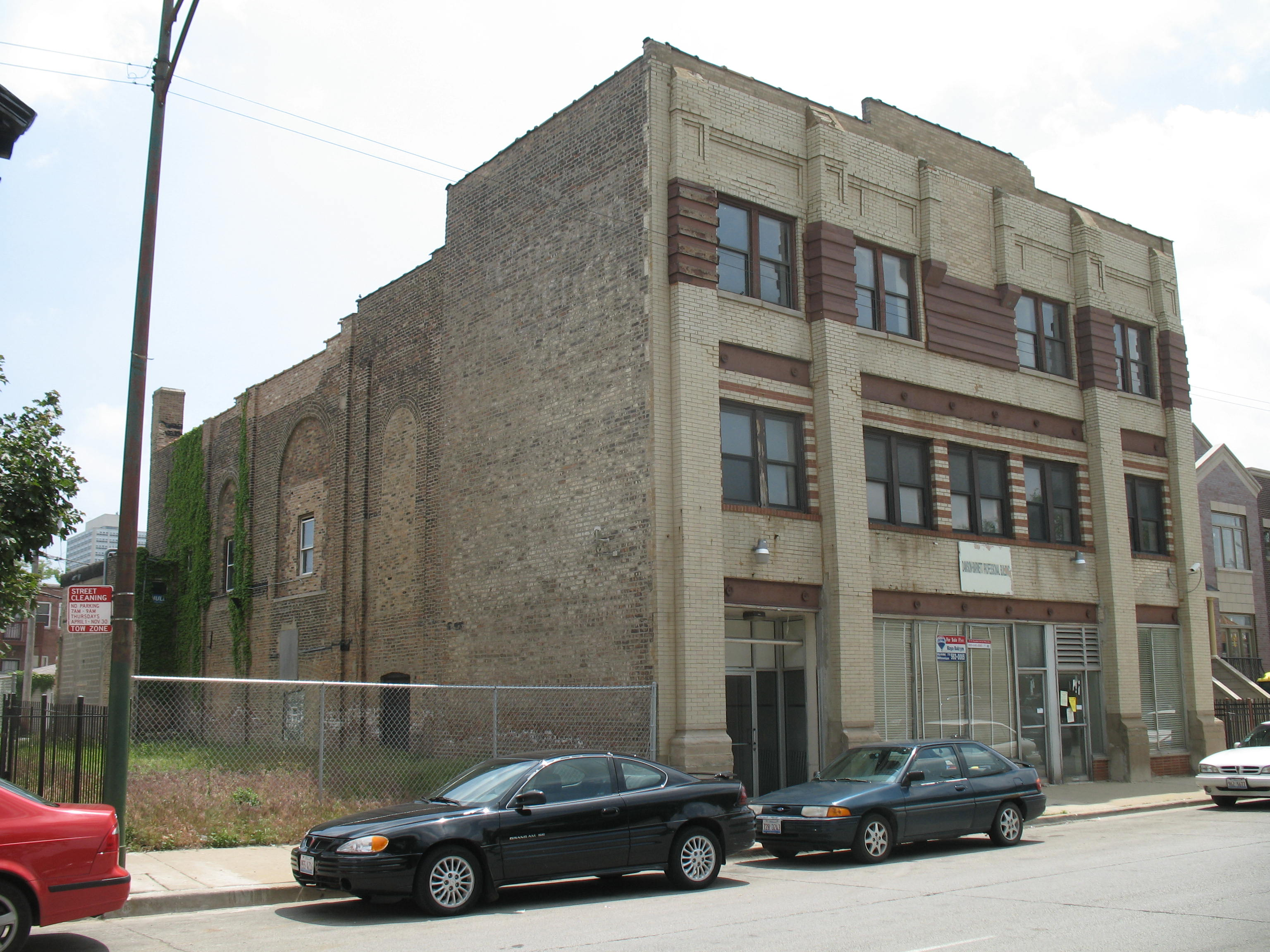

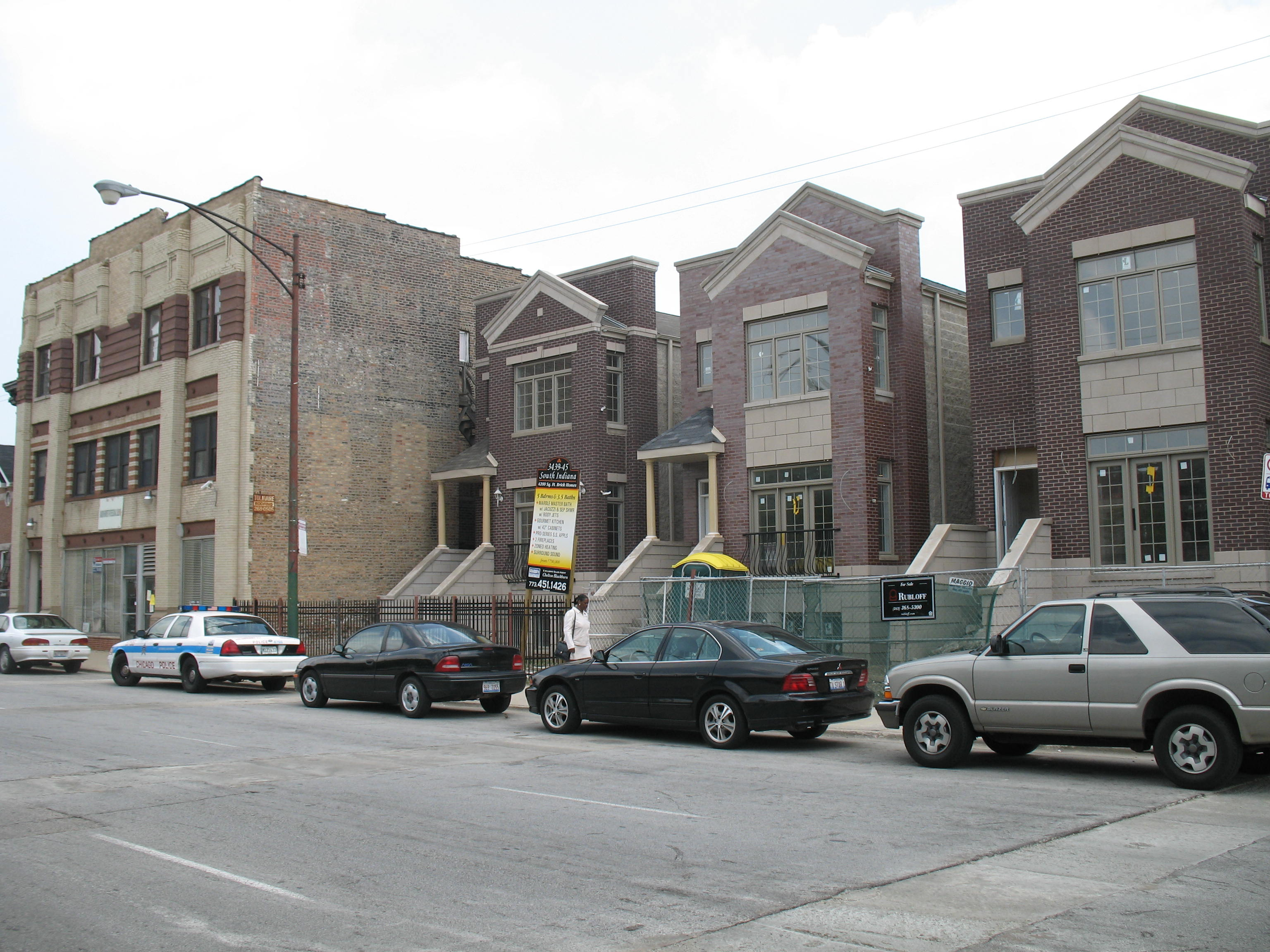
