= Hans Jürgen von der Wense =

Hans Jürgen von der Wense (10 November 1894 – 9 November 1966) was a German poet, composer, photographer, aphorist and hiker.

== Life ==
Wense was born in Ortelsburg, then in East Prussia but today Szczytno in Poland, to a family of military and aristocratic background. In 1914 he began to study philosophy in Berlin. A keen musician, he played some of his own compositions to Arnold Schoenberg in 1915. From 1915 to 1918 he served in the German army.

He began publishing his poetry in 1917. He took part in the Spartacist uprising of 1919 in Berlin. In the following years he pursued his music studies with Clara Zetkin, Hermann Scherchen and Ernst Krenek. Hans Heinz Stuckenschmidt ranked Wense in 1921 with Erik Satie, Igor Stravinsky and Béla Bartók. Some of Wense's early music showed traits of Dadaism, for example his 1919 opus "Music for piano, clarinet and suspended metal colander." A wealthy older artist, Hedwig Woermann (1889–1960), began at this period to support him financially; this support continued until 1945 and allowed him to follow his various pursuits. Although Wense was gay, his friendship with Woermann was one of the deepest in his life.

In 1932 Wense first visited the region of Hesse-Kassel which was to become dear to him. He planned to write a book about hiking in the area between the towns of Göttingen, Paderborn and Eschwege. In 1940 he settled in Göttingen; throughout the Second World War he worked as a factory labourer. In the period 1946–1949 some of his aphorisms were published in a Göttingen journal, but following this he published nothing for the remainder of his life. At his death he left over 300 folders with about 30,000 pages of letters, photographs, reflections and translations, of which 13 contained musical compositions, including transcriptions of music by Gustav Mahler and Dietrich Buxtehude. Wense was also involved in creating a detailed alphabetical index of esoteric extracts from world literature (edited posthumously as Von Aas bis Zylinder).

Wense died in Göttingen in 1966 of colorectal cancer. A number of his writings were published posthumously.

== Compositions ==
Wense's compositions include:

- “Weht der Wind nicht leise”. After a poem by Alfred Mombert. Published in: Melos Berlin, 1920.
- "Musik für Klavier" (Music for piano). ed. Tobias Widmaier. Saarbrücken: Pfau 1994. Includes "Musik für Klavier I – IV op. 1", (1915). "Musik für Klavier Nr. 13", (1919).
- "Ich hatt’ einen Kameraden." (1919).
- "Musik für Gesang" (Music for Voice) I – III op. 2, (1917–19).
- "Musik für Klarinette, Klavier und freihängendes Blechsieb" (Music for piano, clarinet and suspended metal colander.)(1919).
- “Seht doch: unser Freund, er kommt gefahren”. Published in: Der Pfahl VIII. München: Matthes & Seitz 1994.
- “Feuersignale, über Abgründe geblinkt”. After a poem by Wilhelm Klemm. Published in: Der Pfahl VIII. München: Matthes & Seitz 1994.

== Writings ==
Wense's posthumously published writings include:

- Epidot (1987)
- Blume blühen auf Befehl (1993)
- Von Aas bis Zylinder (1995)
- Geschichte einer Jugend (diaries and letters) (1999)
- Wanderjahre (2006).
