= Elam House =

Historic building in Chicago, Illinois, U.S.

Coordinates: 41.8085°N 87.6170°W

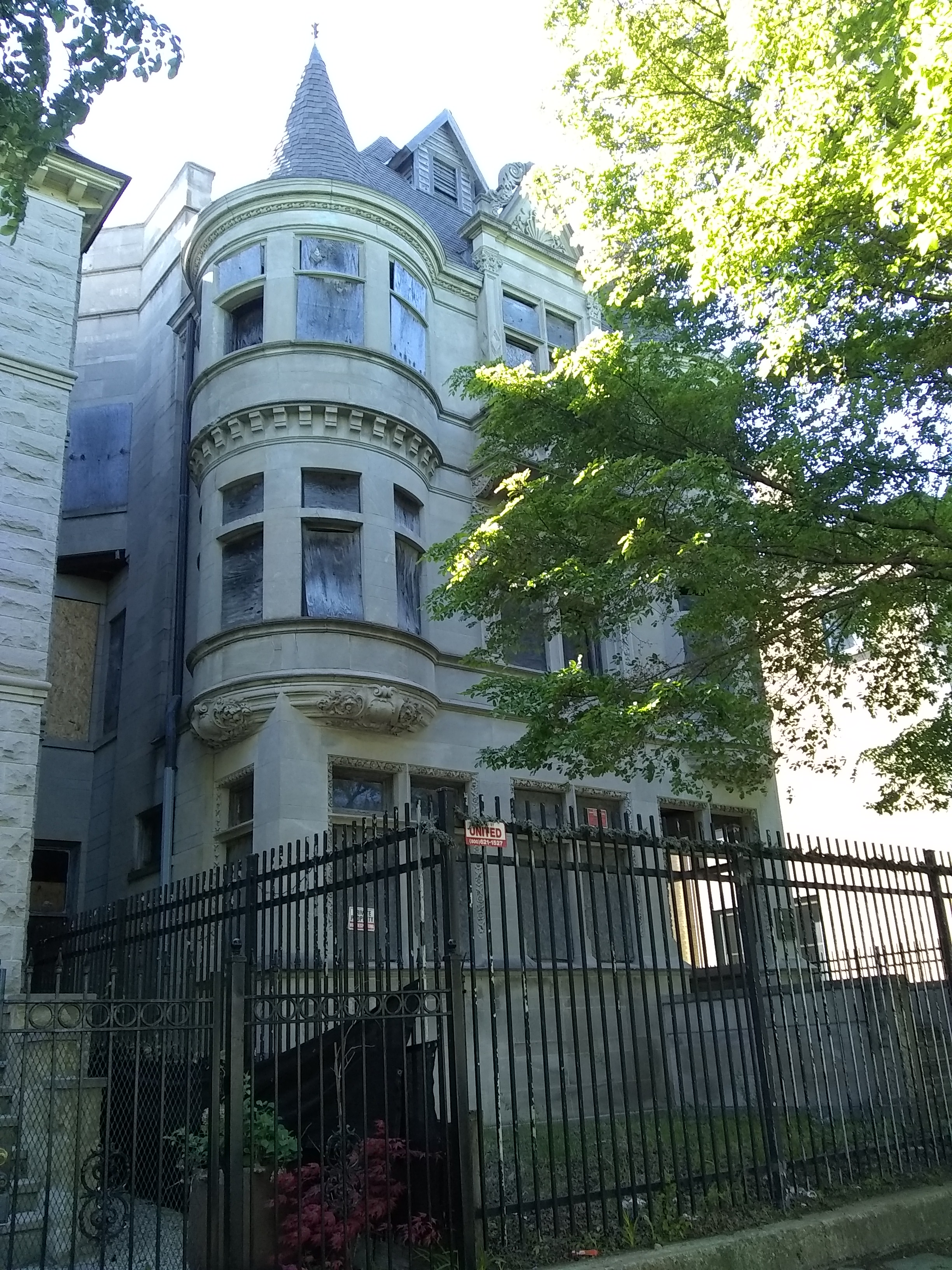
- Interactive map of the Elam House area
- Former names: Simon Marks House

General information
- Location: 4726 South Martin Luther King Jr. Drive, Chicago, Illinois, United States
- Completed: 1903

Design and construction
- Architect: Henry L. Newhouse

Chicago Landmark
- Designated: March 21, 1979

The Elam House, originally Simon Marks House, is a chateauesque-style residential building at 4726 South Martin Luther King Jr. Drive in Chicago, Illinois, United States. The house was designed by Henry L. Newhouse and built in 1903. It was later purchased by Melissia Ann Elam. It was designated a Chicago Landmark on March 21, 1979.

== Background information about Elam House ==
Elam House was owned by Mrs. Melissia Ann Elam. She was born in Missouri in 1853; her parents were slaves. After Emancipation, she moved to Chicago and worked as a maid until she married realtor Rubin Elam.

Seeing the tremendous need for housing and guidance for the many single African American girls and women migrating into the city, Mrs. Elam purchased a home at 4555 South Champlain in 1923 and opened it as the Melissia Anne Elam Home for Working Women and Girls. Mrs. Elam and Isadore Anna Drell purchased the home at 4726 South Park Way in 1926, when demand outgrew space in the Champlain residence. Between the 1930s and the 1950s, Elam Home often housed over 30 women and girls at a time. The home was also the center of many Black, civic, social, and cultural events, including a state convention for African American women.

Mrs. Elam died in 1941 and her niece Loretta Peyton took over as trustee of the home. Mrs. Elam willed Elam House to Centers for New Horizons, Inc. Centers for New Horizons is a not for profit social service agency that serves the Bronzeville and Riverdale communities on the Southside of Chicago, Illinois. Ms. Elam stipulated to Centers for New Horizons in her will that her home be kept in service to the community. She entrusted the home to a group of African American women, who maintained the home as a boarding home. As times changed, fewer women sought housing in boarding homes like Mrs. Elam’s, and the population of Elam House declined, although several women continued to live there well into the 1970s. The Friends of Elam House Foundation was created in 1974 by Margaret Burroughs. At risk of being torn down due to numerous building violations, the Friends of Elam House Foundation raised funds to address these violations and try to attain landmark status. The DuSable Museum of African American History was named trustee of the foundation, and in 1979 the home was declared a Chicago Historical Landmark.

== About Elam House and its importance ==
Elam House, built for and formerly called the Simon Marks House, is an 11,000-square-foot (1,000 m^{2}) Chateauesque mansion that was built in 1903 according to designs by architect Henry L. Newhouse. Chateauesque buildings are characterized by masonry structures, asymmetrical plans, deeply set windows, steeply pitched roofs, and turrets.

Elam House had 20 rooms and featured lovely German wood craftsmanship and beautiful stained-glass and leaded glass windows. The home suffered a serious fire in 1992 and much of the interior was lost, but there are many excellent pictures of the home available to help restore it to its original beauty. In 1994, the Centers for New Horizons partnered with the 863d Engineer Battalion of the US Army Reserve to stabilize the building with a roof and basic interior carpentry and wiring. Since the US Army partnership, Centers for New Horizons has invested over $1 million in the home’s renovation, from insurance proceeds and its own funds.
