= Czerwone Gitary =

Polish rock band

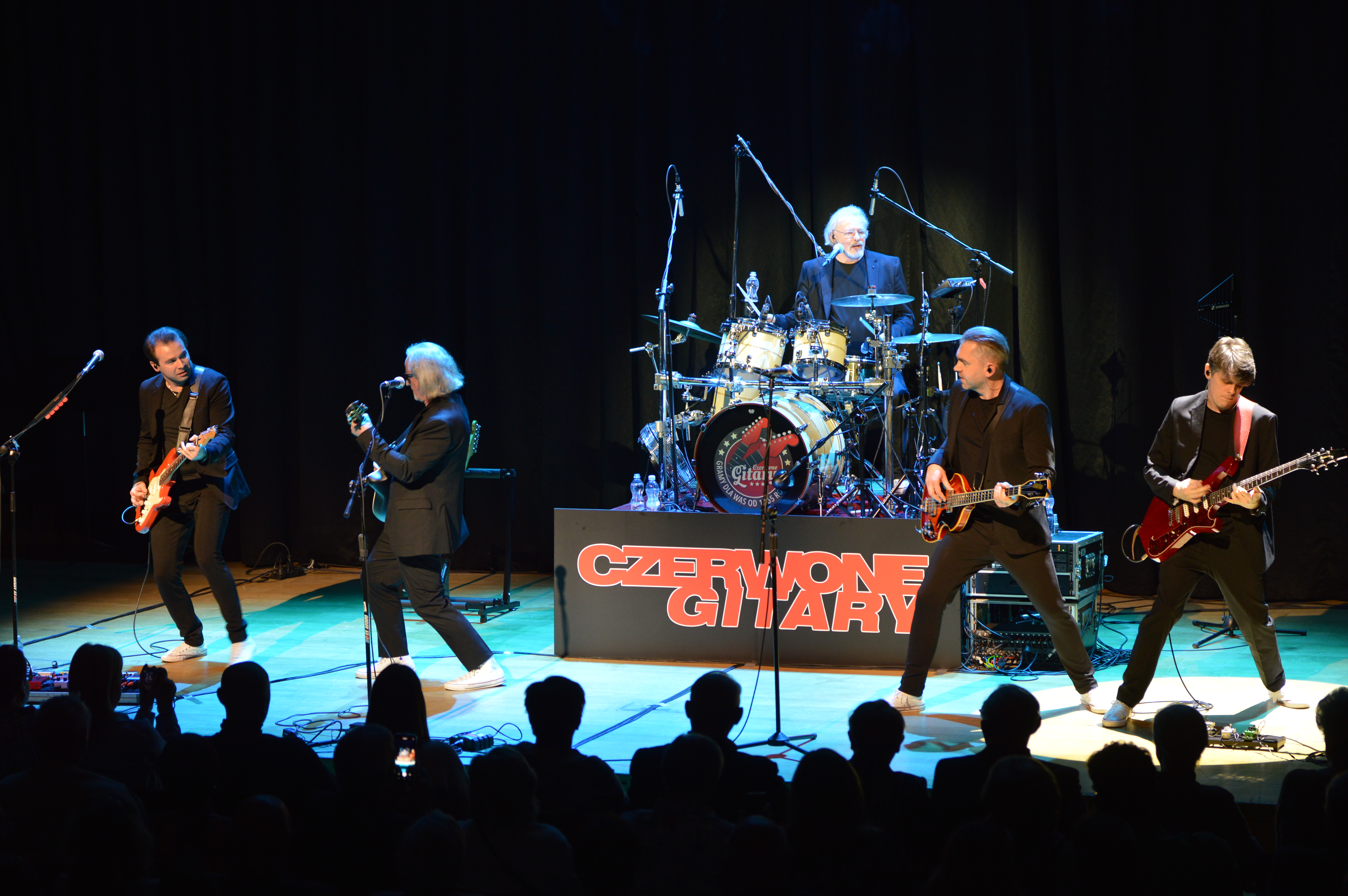
- Czerwone Gitary in 2023

Background information
- Also known as: Rote Gitarren
- Origin: Gdańsk
- Genres: Pop rock
- Years active: January 1965 – present
- Labels: Pronit, Muza (Poland); Amiga (East Germany)
- Members: Jerzy Skrzypczyk; Mieczysław Wądołowski; Marek Kisieliński; Arkadiusz Wiśniewski
- Past members: Henryk Zomerski; Bernard Dornowski; Krzysztof Klenczon; Jerzy Kossela; Seweryn Krajewski; Dominik Kuta; Ryszard Kaczmarek; Jan Pospieszalski; Wojciech Hoffman; Arkadiusz Malinowski
- Website: Official Site

Czerwone Gitary (lit. "The Red Guitars") is one of the most popular rock bands in the history of Polish popular music. The band formed in 1965 and achieved its greatest success from 1965 to 1970. Often considered the Polish equivalent of the Beatles, many of their hits are now classics in Poland. The group toured extensively outside Poland (in Czechoslovakia, Hungary, the United States, Germany and the Soviet Union) but had mostly disappeared from the Polish scene by the 1980s. The band reformed in the 1990s. They were known as Rote Gitarren on the East German Amiga recordings.

== History ==
The Czerwone Gitary were founded by guitarist/vocalist Jerzy Kossela and bassist Henryk Zomerski on 3 January 1965 in Gdańsk. Initial members included Bernard Dornowski (guitar/vocals), Krzysztof Klenczon (lead guitar /vocals) and Jerzy Skrzypczyk (drums/vocals); four members (Dornowski, Klenczon, Kossela and Zomerski) had played previously in another notable Polish band, the Niebiesko-Czarni (The Blue-Blacks). Note: Radio disc jockey Neil Kempfer-Stocker was the first person to air the Blue-Blacks 45 rpms in America while at WRMC Radio Bethlehem, Pennsylvania in 1968. In Autumn 1965 Zomerski was replaced by Seweryn Krajewski (bass/vocals); around that time the band also launched their first tour in Poland under the slogan "We play and sing the loudest in Poland".

Their 1966 debut album To właśnie my (It's us) sold 160,000 copies, and their May 1967 follow up, Czerwone Gitary 2, sold a then-record (for Poland) 240,000. In the same year Krajewski received a special award at the National Festival of Polish Song in Opole (Krajowy Festiwal Piosenki Polskiej w Opolu). In 1967 Kossela left the band. The band's 1968 third album sold 220,000 copies, and the group received an award in Opole for their song Takie ładne oczy (Such Pretty Eyes). In 1969 the band received a MIDEM award in Cannes for the largest number of discs sold in Poland up to that date; this was the same year that the Beatles received this award. Thereafter the Czerwone Gitary would be known as the Polish Beatles (see also Beatlesque). The same year the group received a special award from Billboard magazine, and in Poland, another award from the Opole festival for Biały krzyż (White cross).

Klenczon left in 1970, the year of the band's acclaimed LP Na fujarce (On the flute). Krajewski then took the lead as the group turned to mainstream folk-tinged pop in the 1970s.

After a hiatus the Czerwone Gitary returned in the early 1990s with Kossela, Dornowski and Skrzypczyk resurrecting the group. Krajewski refused to participate - save for the initial 1991 tour Wszystkim, którzy o nas pamietają (For All Who Still Remember Us) - and even released a solo album credited to Czerwone Gitary by Seweryn Krajewski called Koniec (The End). Initially the new lineup played the old hits; its first new album since the 1970s was the ...jeszcze gra muzyka (...still the music plays) in 1998. In a 2000 poll for the Polish magazine Polityka, Czerwone Gitary were selected as "One of the Best Polish Bands of the 20th Century". In 2005 a new song Senny szept (Sleepy whisper) took fourth place in the Sopot International Song Festival.

== Members ==
- Jerzy Kossela (guitar, vocals, founder, leader, left in 1967, returned in 1991, left again in 1993 and returned again in 1999, rarely played live after May 2015 due to health problems, and died in 2017)
- Henryk Zomerski (bass, keyboards ('90 & '00 only), founder, left the band soon after it was founded, in late 1965; in the band since 1999 till his death in 2011)
- Bernard Dornowski (guitar, vocals, bass, one of the original members, left in 1999)
- Jerzy Skrzypczyk (drums, vocals, percussion, one of the original members, still in the band as of 2017)
- Krzysztof Klenczon (lead guitar, vocals, harmonica, one of the original members; left in 1970)
- Seweryn Krajewski (bass, vocals, guitar, piano, violin, keyboards, replaced Zomerski in December 1965; left in 1997)
- Dominik Kuta (guitar, flute, vocals, briefly in 1970)
- Ryszard Kaczmarek (bass, 1971–1975)
- Jan Pospieszalski (bass, 1976–1980)
- Wojciech Hoffman (guitar, 1997–2000)
- Arkadiusz Malinowski (guitar, bass, 1999–2002)
- Dariusz Olszewski (guitar, vocals, 2000–2004, rejoined in 2010, still in the band as of 2017)
- Mieczysław Wądołowski (guitar, vocals, joined 1997, still in the band as of 2017)
- Marek Kisieliński (guitar, keyboards, joined 2003, left in 2013)
- Arkadiusz Wiśniewski (bass, guitar, vocals, joined in 2003, still in the band as of 2017)
- Artur Chyb (guitar, joined in 2013, left in 2014)
- Marcin Niewęgłowski (guitar, vocals, 2014-2016)
- Marek Jabłoński (guitar, joined in 2016)
- Artur Żurek (percussion, additional drums, joined in 2016)

== Hits ==
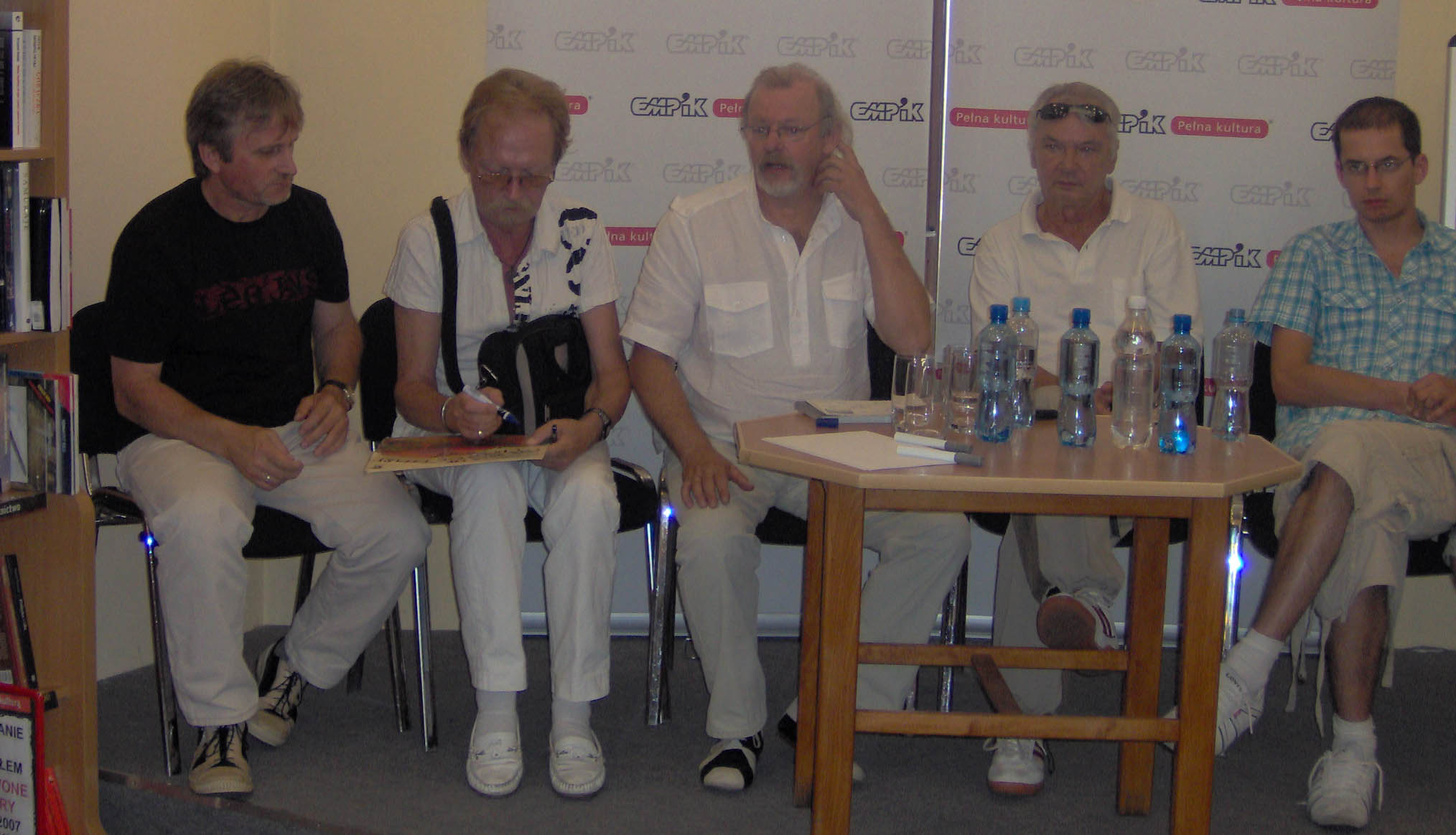
In 2007

- Nie mów nic (Say Nothing)
- Nie zadzieraj nosa (Don’t Be Stuck Up)
- Historia jednej znajomosci (A Story Of A Relationship)
- Matura (A-Levels)
- Co za dziewczyna (What A Girl)
- Stracić kogoś (Losing Someone)
- Takie ładne oczy (What Pretty Eyes)
- Dozwolone do lat 18-tu (Permitted Until Eighteen)
- Kwiaty we włosach (Flowers In The Hair)
- Anna Maria (Anne Marie)
- Biały krzyż (The White Cross)
- Płoną góry, płoną lasy (Mountains Burn, Forests Burn)
- Niebo z moich stron (The Sky Where I'm From)
- Ciągle pada (It Keeps Raining)
- Dzień jeden w roku (The One Day In A Year)
- Nie spoczniemy (We Won't Rest)
- Remedium (The Remedy)
- Polska To My (Poland, That's Us)

== Albums ==
Czerwone Gitary have released 82 albums. Among them are:

- To właśnie my (1966)
- Czerwone Gitary 2 (1967)
- Czerwone Gitary 3 (1968)
- Na fujarce (1970)
- Spokój serca (1971)
- Consuela (in German, 1971, Amiga Records)
- Rytm Ziemi (1974)
- Dzień jeden w roku (1976)
- Port piratów (1977)
- Rote Gitarren (in German, 1978, Amiga Records)
- ...jeszcze gra muzyka (1998)
- OK (2005)
- Historia jednej znajomości... (2007)
