= Henry L. Newhouse =

American architect

Henry L. Newhouse (1874–1929) was an architect in Chicago, Illinois. His work includes the Milford Theatre (Chicago), Blackstone-State Theater, and Sutherland Hotel. He also designed Elam House (1903) and Chicago Defender Building.

He partnered in the firm Newhouse & Bernham (occasionally misspelled as Newhouse & Burnham) with Felix M. Bernham in 1913. Their projects included the Shoreland Hotel, Mammoth Life and Accident Insurance Company Building, and McVickers Theater (1923).

Jerome Soltan was a draftsman for him and Karl Newhouse.

Newhouse designed several theaters for the Ascher Brothers theater chain. He designed at least two synagogues.

His son Henry L. Newhouse II was also an architect.

== Work ==
- Elam House (1903)
- Sutherland Hotel. construction began in 1917 but it was not completed until 1925 after it was requisitioned by the U.S. military for use as a hospital. NRHP listed.

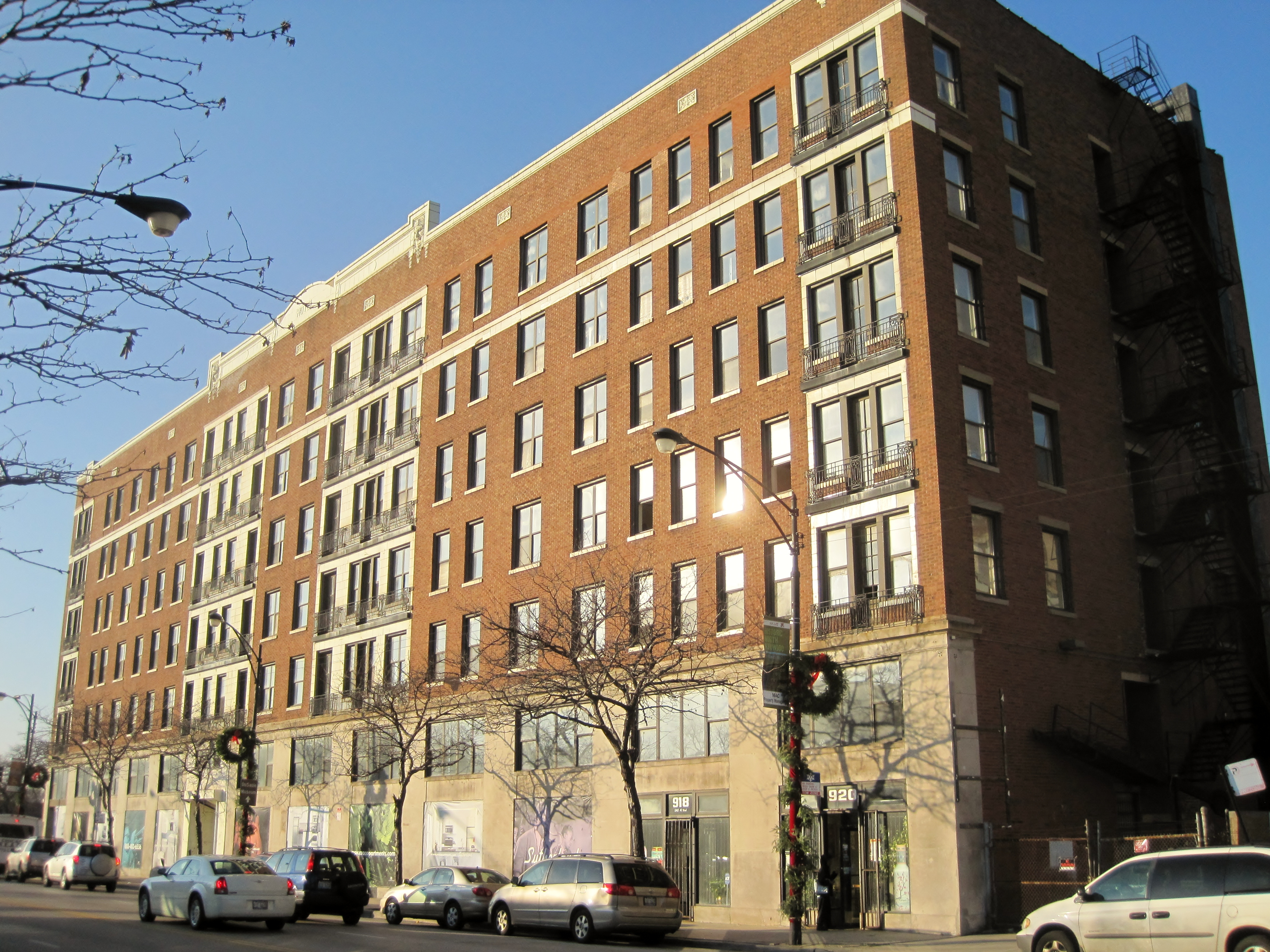
Sutherland Hotel

- Devon Theatre (1915)
- Frolic Theater (1915) at 951 East 55th Street
- Milford Theatre (Chicago) (1917)
- Howard Theater (1918) at 1637 West Howard
- Blackstone-State Theater (1919)
- Mansion at 5052 South Ellis.
- Simon L. Marks mansion (1903) at 4726 S. King Drive
- Chicago Defender Building (1899) at 3435 S. Indiana Avenue. Altered circa 1915. Originally, South Side Hebrew Congregation - Kehilath Anshe Dorum (Congregation of Men of the South) (a synagogue).

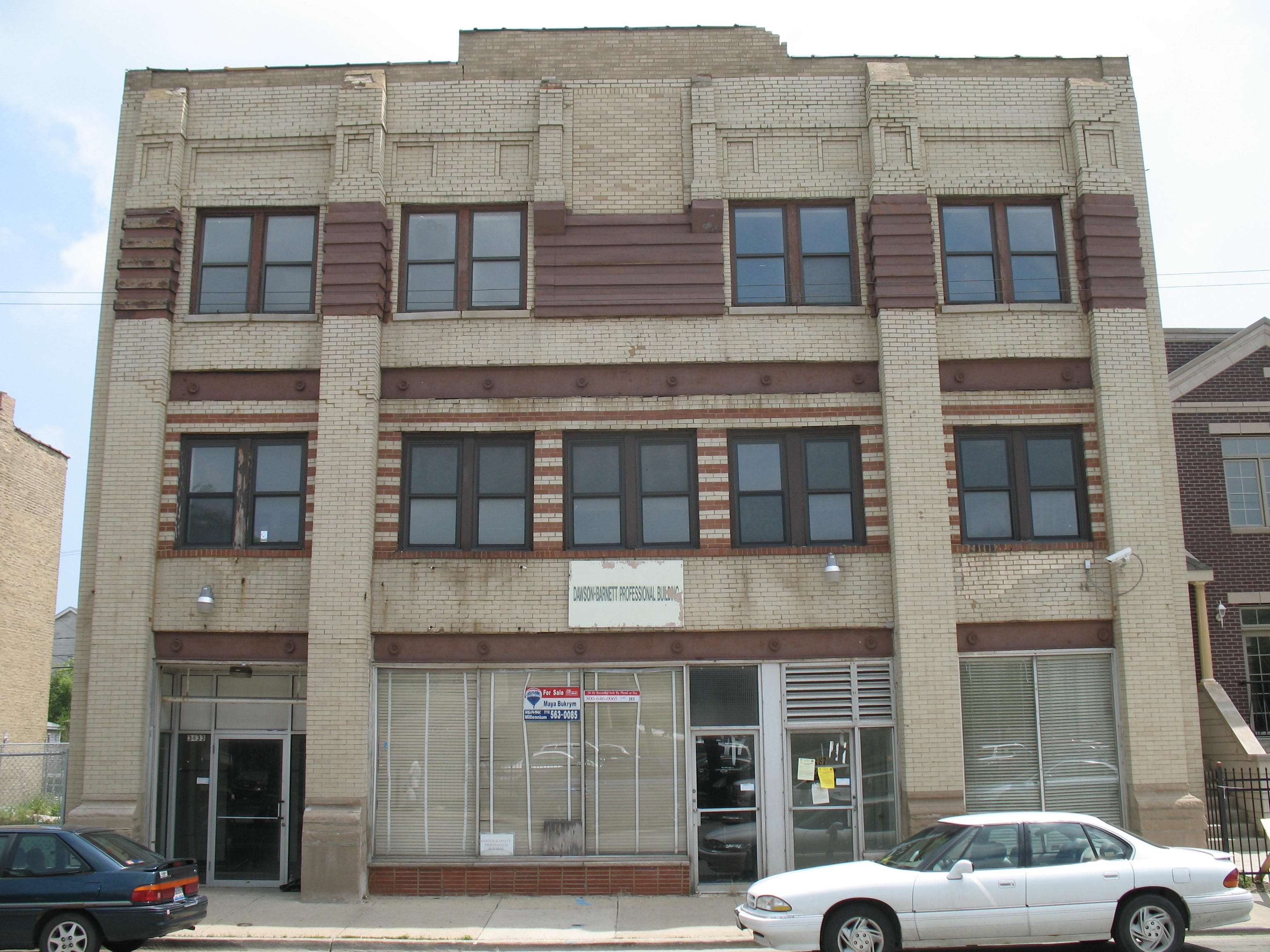
Chicago Defender Building

- H. Mark flat (1913) at 5344 N Magnolia
- Designs for T. G. Dickinson in Washington Park Court
- 1825 Sylvan Court in Flossmoor, Illinois
- Kinzie Building
- Orbit Building at Central Park Avenue and Milwaukee Avenue
- Columbus Theater (1916) at 6236 South Ashland
- Lederer Building
- Apartment building for Isadore A. Rubel
