= Klaus Kilimann =

German politician (1938–2024)

- Born: 11 October 1938; Ortelsburg, Gau East Prussia, Germany
- Died: 26 May 2024 (aged 85); Rostock, Mecklenburg-Vorpommern, Germany
- Occupations: Physicist, politician
- Political party: NF (1989); SDP (1990); SPD (1990)

Klaus Kilimann (11 October 1938 – 26 May 2024) was a German physicist who became an SPD politician after 1989. Between 1990 and 1993 he served as Oberbürgermeister of Rostock.

== Life and career ==
Kilimann was born in East Prussia. His father was a railway worker. He began attending primary school in Ortelsburg, his birthplace, which was at the time in Germany. By the time the Red army arrived in January 1945 most of the population had fled, however, and in 1944 or 1945 Kilimann was among the millions of Germans forcibly relocated in a westward direction. The family ended up in Neukloster not far from Rostock in the Soviet occupation zone of what remained of Germany, and it was here that he concluded his primary education and then attended a secondary school till 1956.

From 1956 Kilimann attended the University of Rostock from where he emerged in 1961 with a degree in Physics. He then undertook post-graduate studies at Moscow State University till 1963, when he returned to Rostock and took a university post as a research assistant at the Mathematics department. He transferred to the Physics department in 1964 which was also the year in which he received his doctorate. He remained at the university as a senior research assistant from 1970 till 1979, having in 1978 produced his Habilitation dissertation on a topic in theoretical physics. Between 1980 and 1990 he was employed as an associate professor. During that period, however, for three years from 1982 he was based in Nicaragua, helping to set up a Physics education department at an academy in the capital, Managua.

In October 1989 Kilimann became a member of New Forum in Rostock. New Forum was a quasi-political party, sometimes described as a "citizens' initiative", that emerged during the second half of 1989 in the context of growing civil unrest in the country. As a member, Kilimann participated locally in the legal committee set up within the wider context of the Round Table discussions that were established in various parts of the country as part of what was now becoming known as East Germany's Peaceful Revolution. In January 1990, having quit New Forum, Kilimann joined the newly (in East Germany) re-formed Social Democratic Party (SDP) which had till October 1989 been effectively muted following the creation in 1946 of the East German Socialist Unity Party. In October 1990, with the formal reunification of East and West Germany, the East German SDP and (hitherto West German) SPD merged, which made Kilimann a member of the German Social Democratic Party (SPD).

On 31 May 1990, Kilimann was elected Lord Mayor of Rostock in succession to Christoph Kleemann. He resigned the office three and a half years later on 3 December 1993, following reports on race riots targeting asylum-seekers, fourteen months earlier, in August 1992. The reports concluded that local police chiefs and political leaders had permitted tensions to fester and then failed act quickly and decisively when rioting broke out. Kilimann himself had been out of town when the riots started and returned from his break only as the violence reached its third night. After his resignation Kilimann was unemployed for a period till September 1994.

From 1994 till his retirement in 2005 Kilimann worked on a succession of consultancy projects on behalf of the German Ministry of Economic Cooperation and Development. The consultancy work took him to Saint Petersburg, Moscow and Kyrgyzstan.

Kilimann died on 26 May 2024, at the age of 85.
