= Skokie Valley Agudath Jacob Synagogue =

Orthodox Jewish synagogue

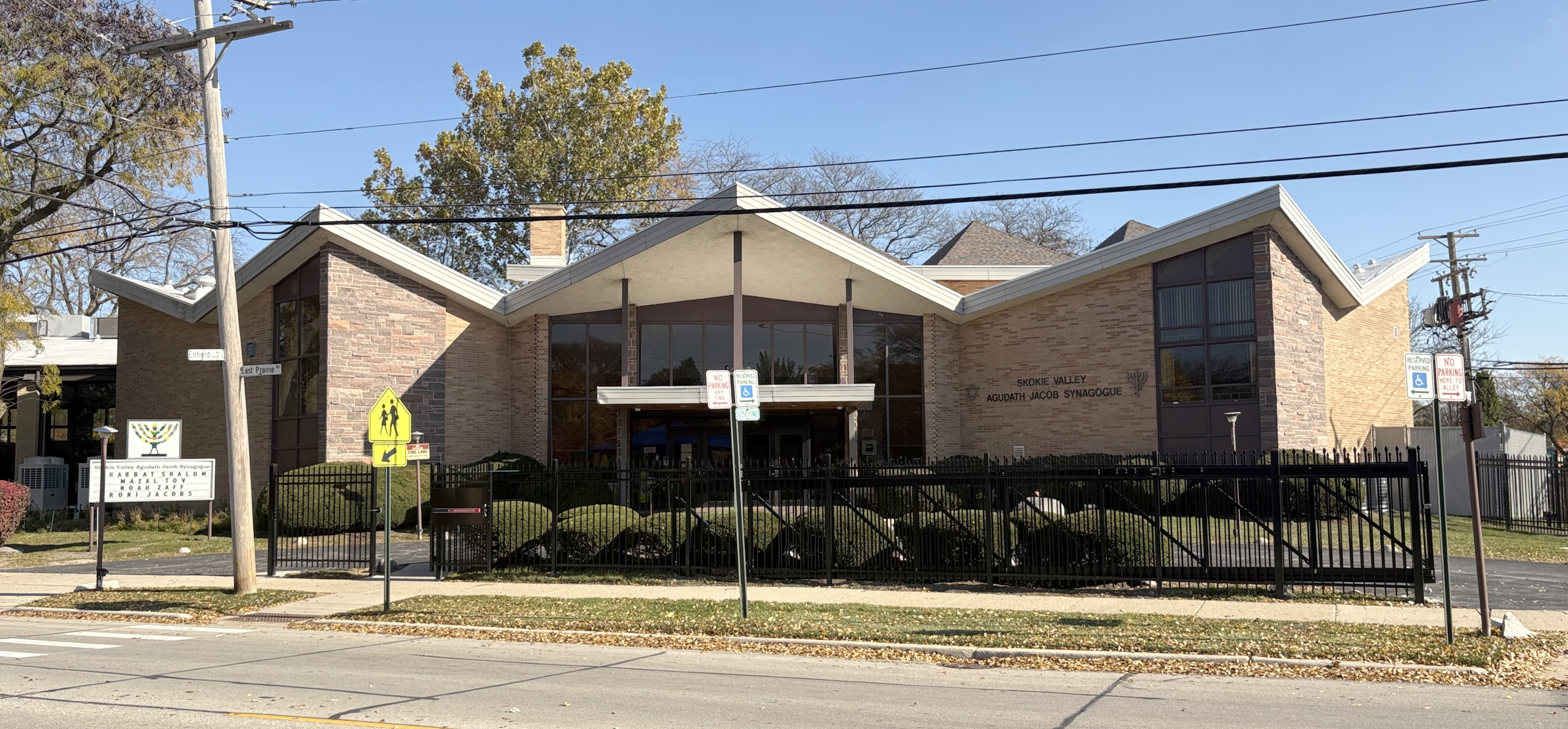

Religion
- Affiliation: Orthodox Judaism
- Ecclesiastical or organizational status: Synagogue
- Leadership: Rabbi Ari Hart; Rabbinit Yael Keller; Rabbi Hody Nemes
- Status: Active

Location
- Location: 8825 East Prairie Road, Skokie, Illinois
- Country: United States
- Interactive map of Skokie Valley Agudath Jacob Synagogue
- Coordinates: 42.0416°N 87.7191°W

Architecture
- Architects: Jerome Soltan; Esther Sperber
- Type: Synagogue architecture
- Established: 1956 (as a congregation)
- Completed: 1963

Website
- svaj.org

Skokie Valley Agudath Jacob Synagogue is an Orthodox Jewish synagogue located at 8825 East Prairie Road in Skokie, Illinois. Originally a traditional synagogue, it was founded in 1956 and is one of the oldest active synagogues in Skokie.

== History ==
After World War II, Skokie began to grow rapidly. In the 1950s, more than half of the newcomers to Skokie were Jewish families. Skokie Valley Traditional Synagogue was founded in 1956, with groundbreaking ceremonies for the building held on September 29, 1957. Rabbi Milton Kanter was the founding rabbi, and Samuel Berger was the first president and founder. In 1962, Reuben Cooper was named the synagogue's cantor. As a traditional synagogue, it had more than 1,500 members at its height.

Skokie's first mechitza minyan formed by Rabbi Dr. Eliezer Berkovits in the basement of Skokie Valley's building. That minyan would ultimately move down the road to form a new Orthodox synagogue, Congregation Or Torah, in 1969.

In 1995, while under the leadership of Rabbi Louis Tuchman, Skokie Valley Traditional Synagogue merged with Congregation Agudath Jacob of Evanston, becoming Skokie Valley Agudath Jacob. Around 1996, Rabbi Yechiel Eckstein began a brief stint as the synagogue's rabbi. In 1997, Rabbi Jack Engel was named the synagogue's new rabbi. In 1998, Skokie Valley merged with B'nai Jacob Synagogue of West Rogers Park, Chicago.

By the early 2000s, the traditional synagogue's membership had dwindled to 130 people, with an average age of 75. Around 2013, the synagogue began to move in a new direction as an inclusive Orthodox Jewish congregation, with separate (instead of mixed) seating, encouraging women's spiritual leadership, and an emphasis on building positive relationships with the wider Jewish community and the world. In 2017, when Rabbi Ari Hart was hired as its new leader, the synagogue had 160 member households. By 2023, it had grown to 325 member households. The synagogue also helped develop Solu, an initiative to help feed and clothe the needy through interfaith efforts, and respond to racial injustice, antisemitism, mental health, violence prevention, and literacy. In 2025, Solu launched Hersh's Fridge in the synagogue parking lot, naming the kosher community fridge in memory of Hersh Goldberg-Polin following his kidnapping and murder.

== Architecture and design ==
The sanctuary was completed in 1963, under the firm of architect Jerome Soltan. In 2020, a major renovation of the interior was undertaken in the modern style. It was completed in 2023, led by Studio ST Architects behind principal architect Esther Sperber. The sanctuary was redesigned, a new HVAC system was installed, and bathrooms and a coat room were added.

== See also ==
- History of the Jews in Chicago
- List of synagogues in the United States
