= Szczytno =

Town in Warmian-Masurian Voivodeship, Poland

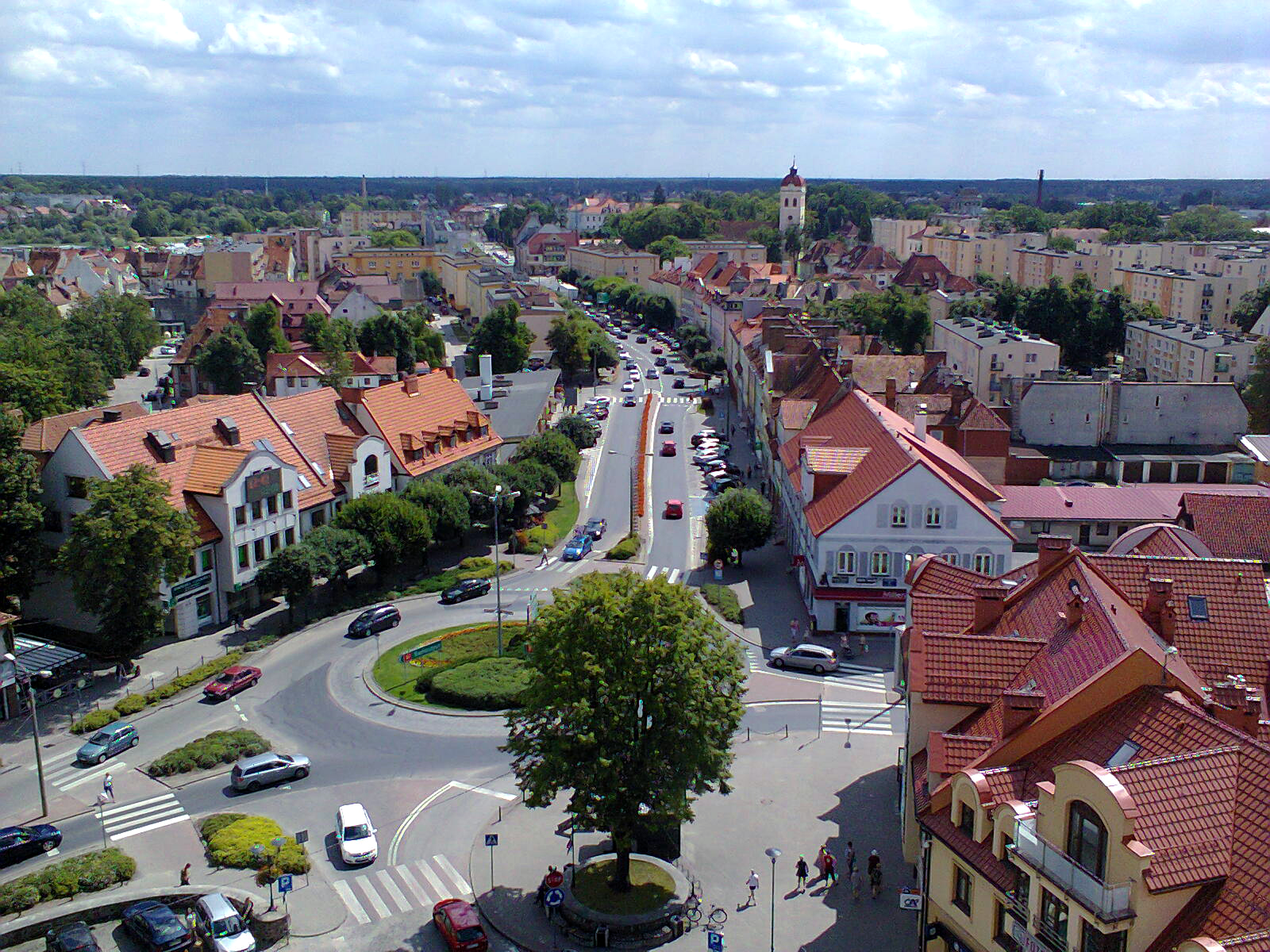
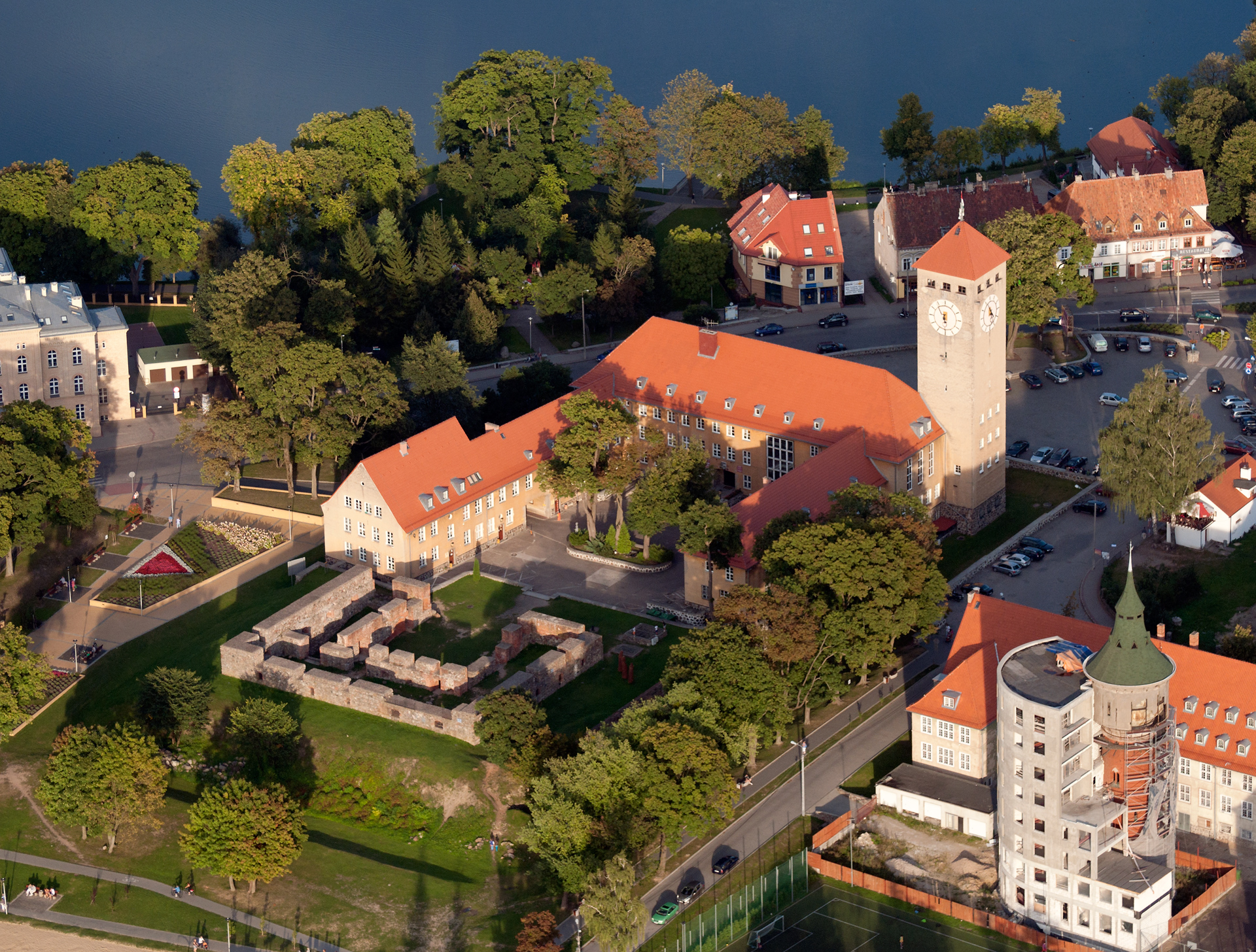
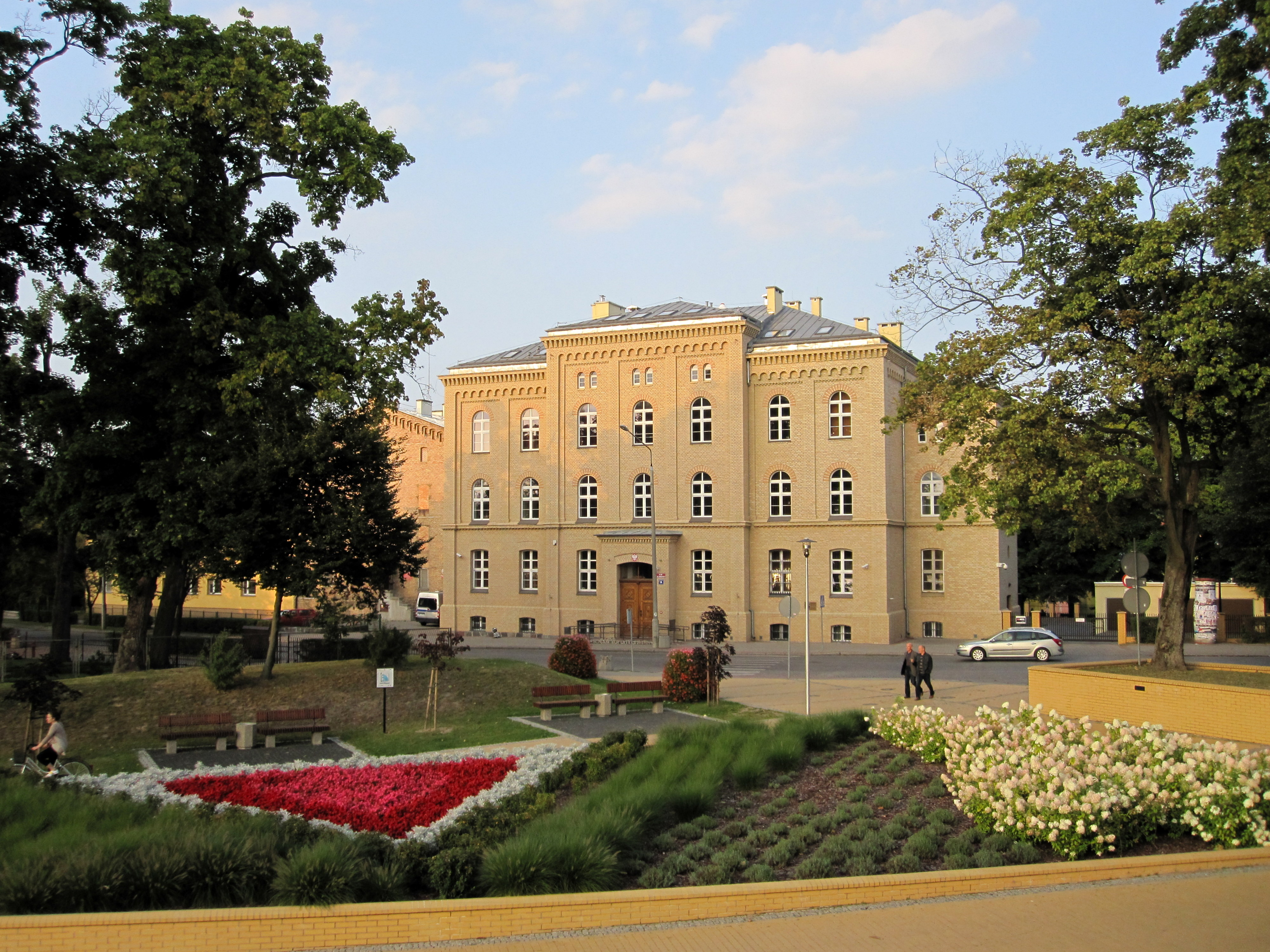
- Town center Ruins of the castle beside the Town Hall District court

- Flag Coat of arms

- Location within Poland
- Coordinates: 53°33′46″N 20°59′7″E
- Country: Poland
- Voivodeship: Warmian-Masurian
- County: Szczytno
- Gmina: Szczytno (urban gmina)
- Established: 1359
- Town rights: 1723

Government
  - Mayor: Stefan Ochman

Area
  - Total: 9.96 km^{2} (3.85 sq mi)

Population (2007)
  - Total: 27,013
  - Density: 2,710/km^{2} (7,020/sq mi)
- Time zone: UTC+1 (CET)
  - Summer (DST): UTC+2 (CEST)
- Postal code: 12-100 to 12-102
- Area code: +48 89
- Car plates: NSZ
- Primary airport: Olsztyn-Mazury Airport
- Website: https://miastoszczytno.pl/

Szczytno [ˈʂt͡ʂɨtnɔ] (German: Ortelsburg) is a town in northeastern Poland with 27,013 inhabitants (2007). It is the seat of Szczytno County in the Warmian-Masurian Voivodship, within the ethnocultural region of Masuria.

Olsztyn-Mazury Regional Airport, located nearby, is the most important airport of the Masurian region. Szczytno is located on the Olsztyn – Ełk railway line and Szczytno – Ostrołęka line. Szczytno also had minor rail connections towards Czerwonka; however, these were later closed by Polish Railways.

Two lakes, Domowe Małe and Długie (also known as Domowe Duże), are located within the town limits.

Szczytno is a member of Cittaslow.

== History ==
=== Middle Ages ===
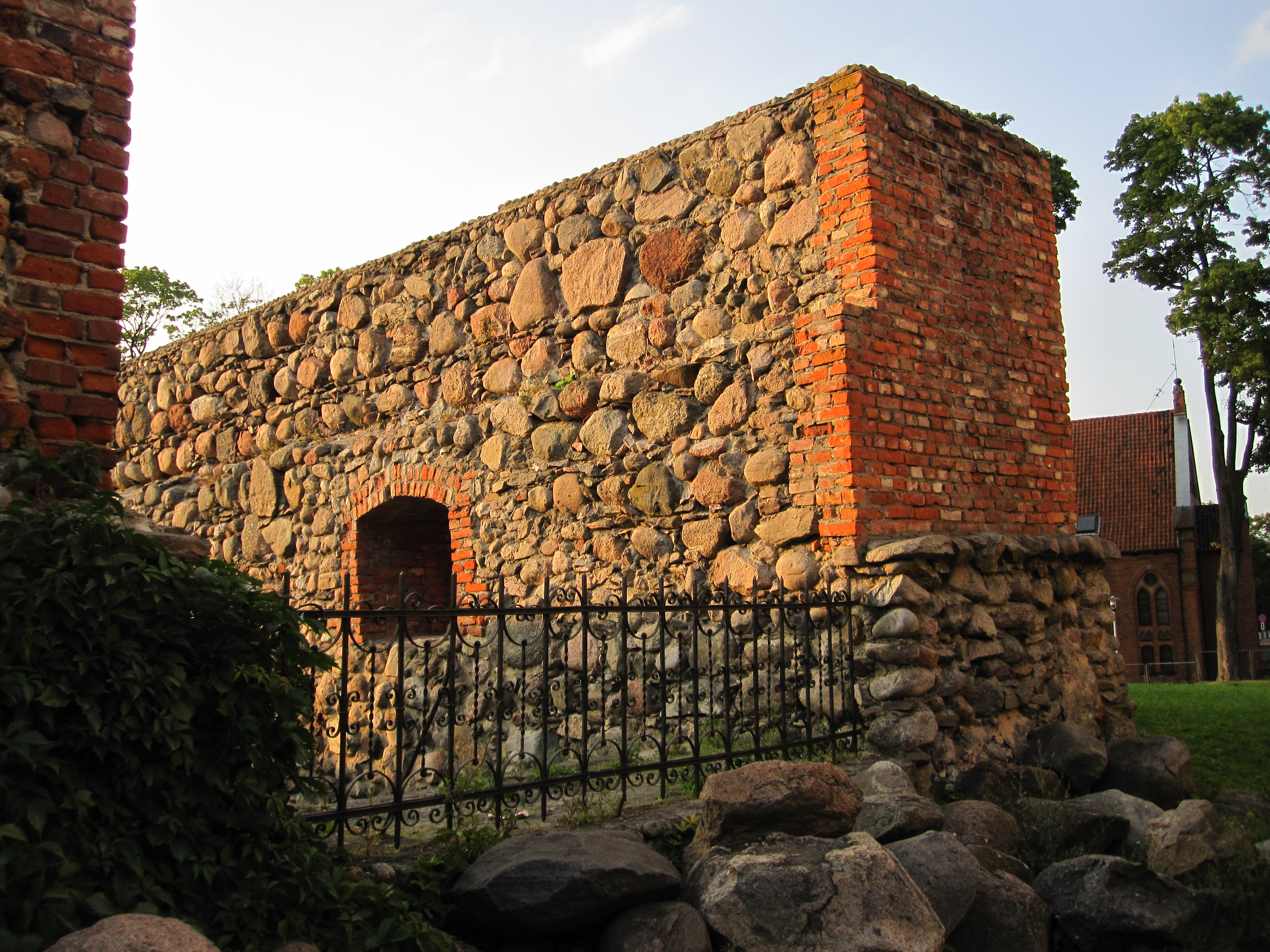
Ruins of the castle

Near today's Szczytno are the only known megalithic tombs in Warmia-Masuria. The town was originally a settlement of Old Prussians.

Between 1350 and 1360 Ortolf von Trier, a knight of the Teutonic Order and the Komtur of Elbing (Elbląg), founded a fort in the Old Prussian region of Galindia, probably near an Old Prussian settlement. The first mention of the fort, eponymously named Ortulfsburg, was a document from September 1360, after Ortolf invited Polish colonists from nearby Masovia, among whom the settlement became known as Szczytno. The first custodian of the settlement was Heinrich Murer. In 1370 the wooden fort was destroyed by Lithuanians led by Kęstutis, after which it was rebuilt using stone. In German, the name Ortulfsburg gradually morphed into Ortelsburg. The settlement grew in size owing to its location on a trade route from Warsaw to Königsberg (now Kaliningrad).

In the wake of the Polish-Lithuanian victory over the Order at Grunwald in 1410, the castle was occupied by Polish troops. In 1454 King Casimir IV Jagiellon incorporated the town and region to the Kingdom of Poland upon the request of the anti-Teutonic Prussian Confederation. The castle passed to Poland, but later on was recaptured by the Teutonic Knights. After the Second Peace of Toruń of 1466 it became part of Poland as a fief held by the Teutonic state. In the 15th century, a Catholic church was built, whose first parish priest became Mikołaj of Rzekwuj from the Płock land in Masovia. Two inns existed by 1483.

=== Modern era ===
With its inclusion in the Ducal Prussia in 1525, which remained under Polish suzerainty, it lost its importance as a border fortress and began to decline. It was a overwhelmingly Polish town, and, according to Gerard Labuda, in 1538 only four townsmen did not speak Polish. In the 16th century, the town had three inns (two owned by Poles), two bathhouses and several craft workshops. Margrave and regent George Frederick, who enjoyed hunting nearby, began the redevelopment of the area. Among his projects was the rebuilding of the castle into a hunting lodge. A school was established in the 16th century, and in the 17th century it had Polish, German, and Latin classes, and the director and cantor had to know Polish. The adjacent beekeeper settlement (now within town limits) also had its own Polish school.

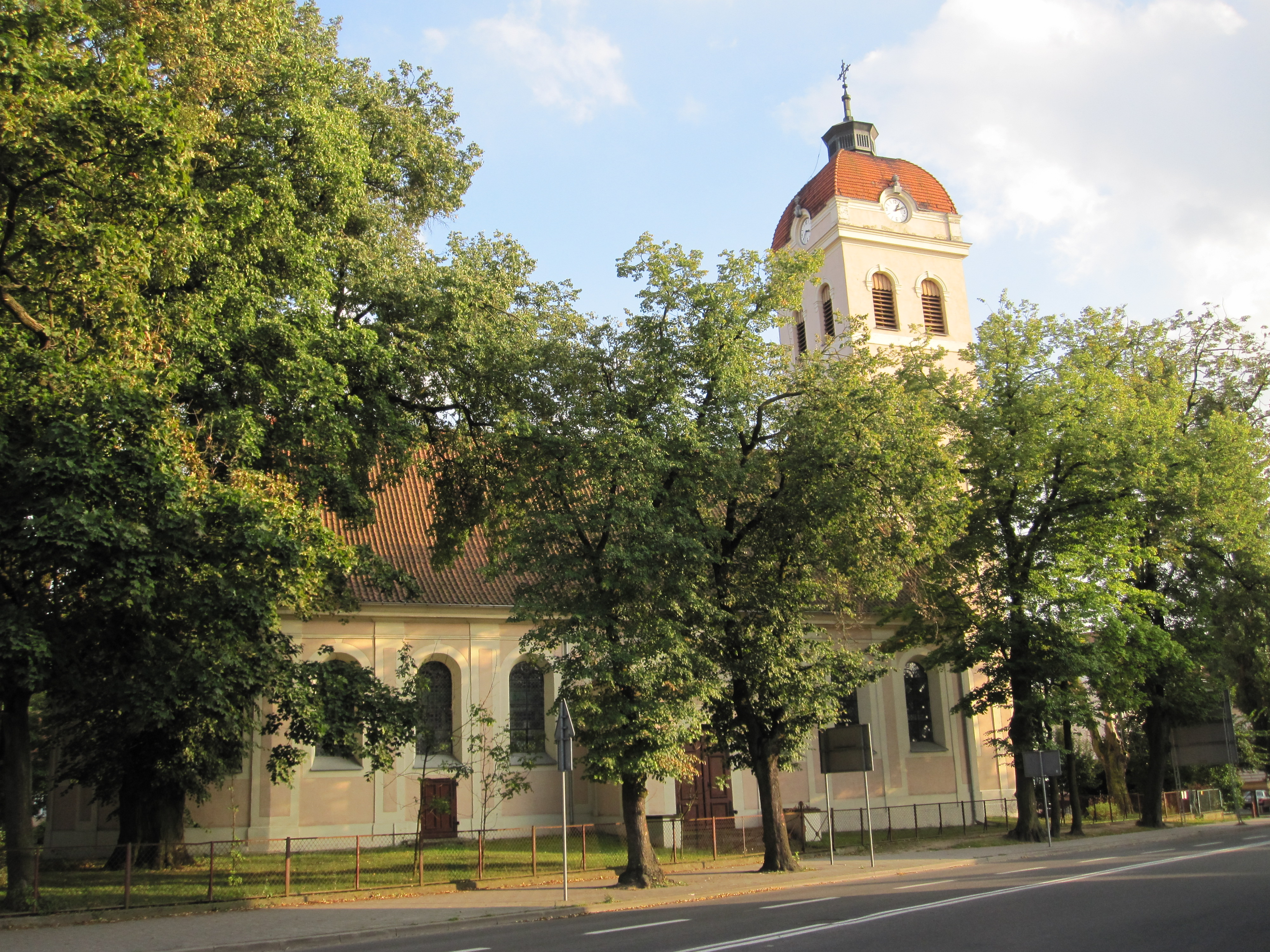
Baroque Evangelical church

In 1602 local markets and fairs were established. In 1616, it was granted partial town rights, including local jurisdiction and brewing privileges. As of 1616, the population was nearly 250, mostly Polish. The main source of income was brewing, and there were also many shoemakers. In the 17th century, Scottish immigrants established a pharmacy. King Władysław IV Vasa of Poland visited the town from 1628–29 and in 1639. The town suffered from fires in 1653, 1669, 1698 and 1714 and epidemics in the mid-17th century and early 18th century. During the Deluge, the castle was heavily garrisoned and a town militia was organized from the local Poles, preventing the town from being invaded and occupied.

The town became part of the Kingdom of Prussia in 1701. In 1716, 36 residents brewed beer, and the barley came mainly from Poland, whereas locally produced linen and cloth were exported to Poland. The population was predominantly Polish, and Polish was widely spoken, including in the local church. King Frederick William I of Prussia granted Ortelsburg full town rights in 1723. During the Seven Years' War, in 1758, the town was occupied by Russian troops. In 1773 it was included in the newly formed province of East Prussia.

As a result of the Partitions of Poland and the Napoleonic Wars, the years 1795–1813 were the worst period in the economic history of the town. The castle fell into disrepair, and after 1786 its eastern wing was demolished. Prussian King Frederick William III and Queen Louise arrived in the town on 23 November 1806 while fleeing French troops during the Fourth Coalition. The town was briefly the seat of the Prussian government, and Frederick William released his Ortelsburger Publicandum — a series of constitutional, administrative, social and economic reforms — there on 1 December 1806. Queen Louise spoke to the local people in Polish. Later that month, French troops occupied and plundered Ortelsburg. Six years later the town was forced to host numerous troops of the Napoleon's Grande Armée, which invaded Russia.

In 1818, after the Prussian administrative reforms, Ortelsburg became the seat of Landkreis Ortelsburg, one of the largest in East Prussia. According to municipal records, in 1824 the town's population was predominantly Polish. From the mid-19th century, the town developed again, trade flourished, merchants from the Russian Partition of Poland attended local markets and fairs, crafts developed, although brewing lost its importance. The town became part of the German Empire in 1871 during the unification of Germany. Town limits were expanded in 1868, 1901, 1906 and 1913. From the 1880s to the 1900s, the town was connected by rail to a number of towns in Warmia and Masuria and became a railway junction. State and district offices and a military garrison were established in the town, which contributed to an influx of Germans into the Polish-dominated town.

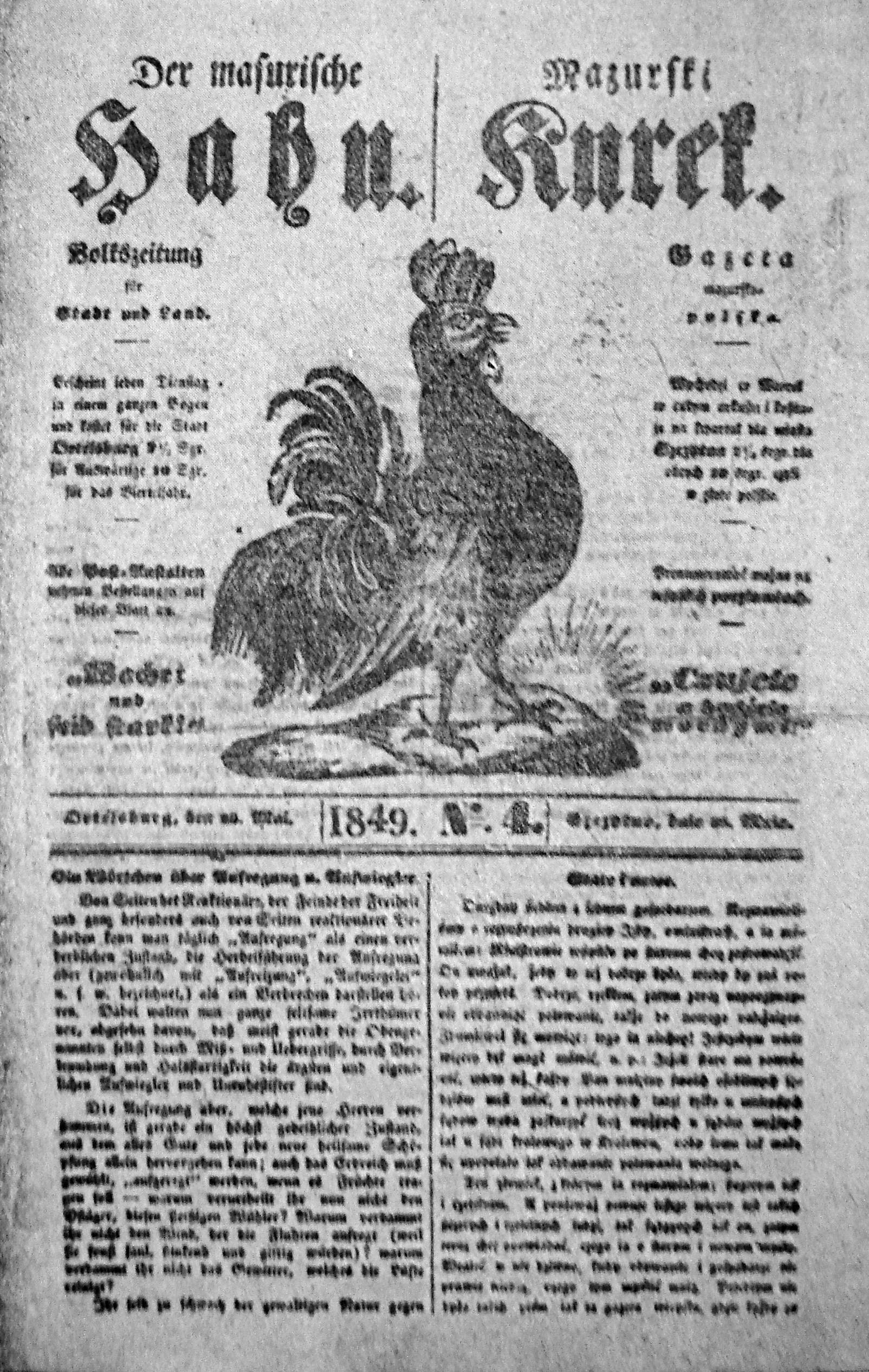
Front page of Der masurische Hahn/Kurek Mazurski, 1849

It became an important center of the Polish movement in Masuria and resistance to Germanisation. During the revolutions of 1848, local Polish activists founded a local Constitutional Club and intended to publish a local Polish newspaper, with Antoni Gąsiorowski as its editor. After the Prussian victory, Gąsiorowski published the bilingual Polish-German newspaper Der masurische Hahn/Kurek Mazurski in the town. The Masurian People's Party (Mazurska Partia Ludowa), founded in 1896 in Lyck (Ełk), had one of its main branches here. From 1906 the Polish newspaper Mazur was published here, and in 1910, Bogumił Labusz and Gustaw Leyding founded the Masurian People's Bank (Mazurski Bank Ludowy). In 1908 Polish writer and Nobel Prize laureate Henryk Sienkiewicz, who popularized the small town through his historical novel The Knights of the Cross and whose works were published in Mazur, visited the town. In post-World War II Poland, a monument to Sienkiewicz was unveiled in the town center, next to the town hall and the ruins of the castle. Szczytno was one of the centers of the gromadkarze, a local Masurian folk Protestant religious movement that preserved the Polish language and boycotted German church services. The Trąba Ewangelijna magazine for gromadkarze was published here from 1912 by Reinhold Barcz.

=== World War I and interbellum ===
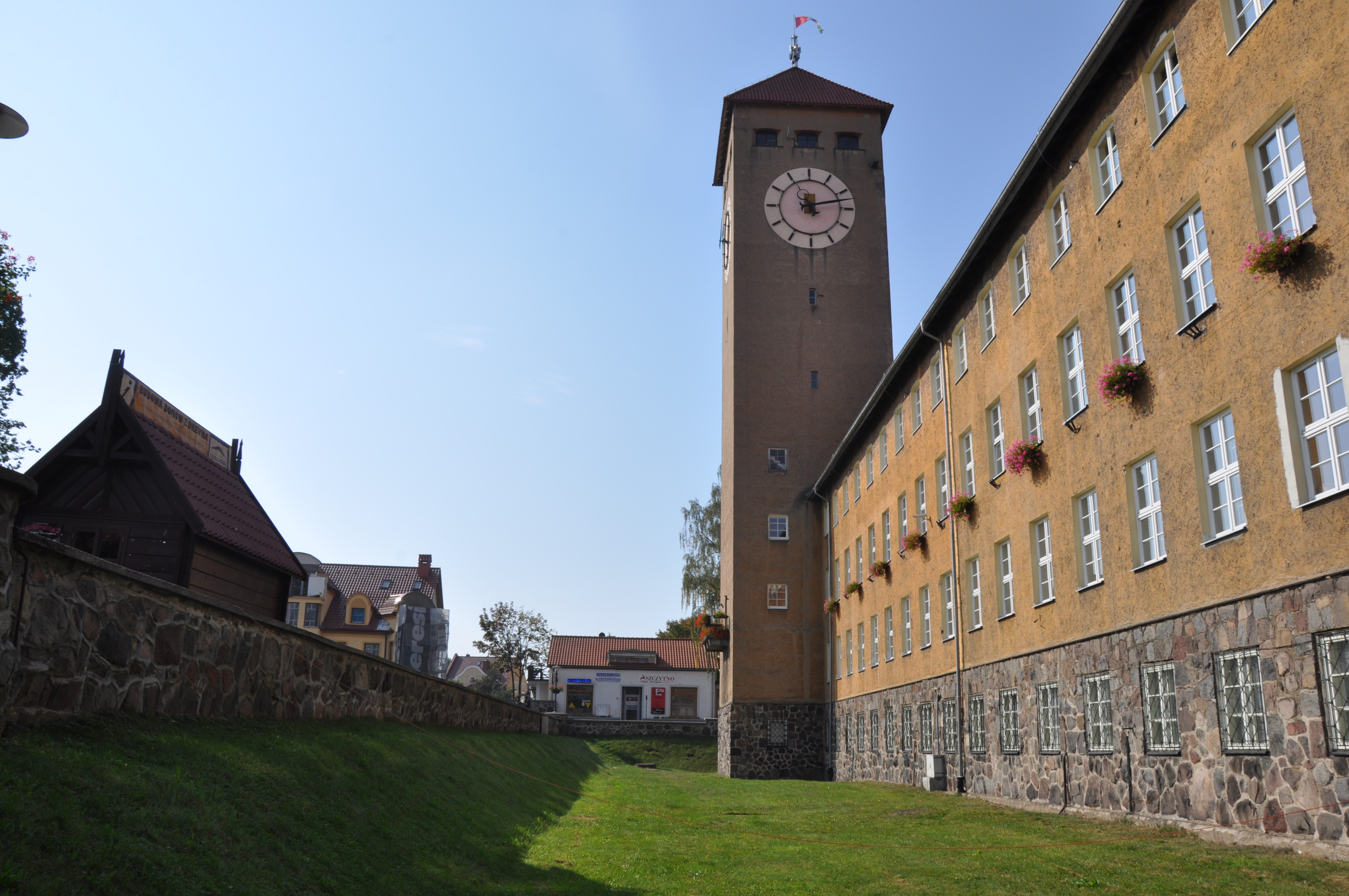
Town hall

Ortelsburg was almost completely destroyed at the beginning of World War I by troops of the Russian Empire, 160 houses and 321 commercial buildings burned down between 27 and 30 August 1914. The town's recovery was supported by contributions raised in Berlin and Vienna. In 1916 the Viennese modernist Josef Hoffmann visited Ortelsburg, his plans for a new town hall were not carried out. A new town hall, an example of Nazi architecture in East Prussia, was finally built in 1938 and listed as a historical monument in 1991. The initial plans for the reconstruction of the town were based on Bruno Möhring's work but carried out by several local architects.

It was the main centre of activity for the Masurian People's Union (Mazurski Związek Ludowy), an organisation advocating the unification of Masuria with Poland, founded in 1919. The East Prussian plebiscite of 11 July 1920, which was held according to the Versailles treaty under the supervision of Allied troops, resulted in 5,336 votes for Germany and 15 for Poland. It was preceded by persecution of local Polish activists by the Germans, pro-Polish rallies and meetings were dispersed. On January 21, 1920 ("Bloody Wednesday") a German militia armed with crowbars, metal rods, and shovels, attacked the gathering of local Polish activists and severely beat local Polish leaders Bogumił Linka and Bogumił Leyk, all at the instigation of the local German authorities. Even after the plebiscite pro-Polish voters and activists were still persecuted.

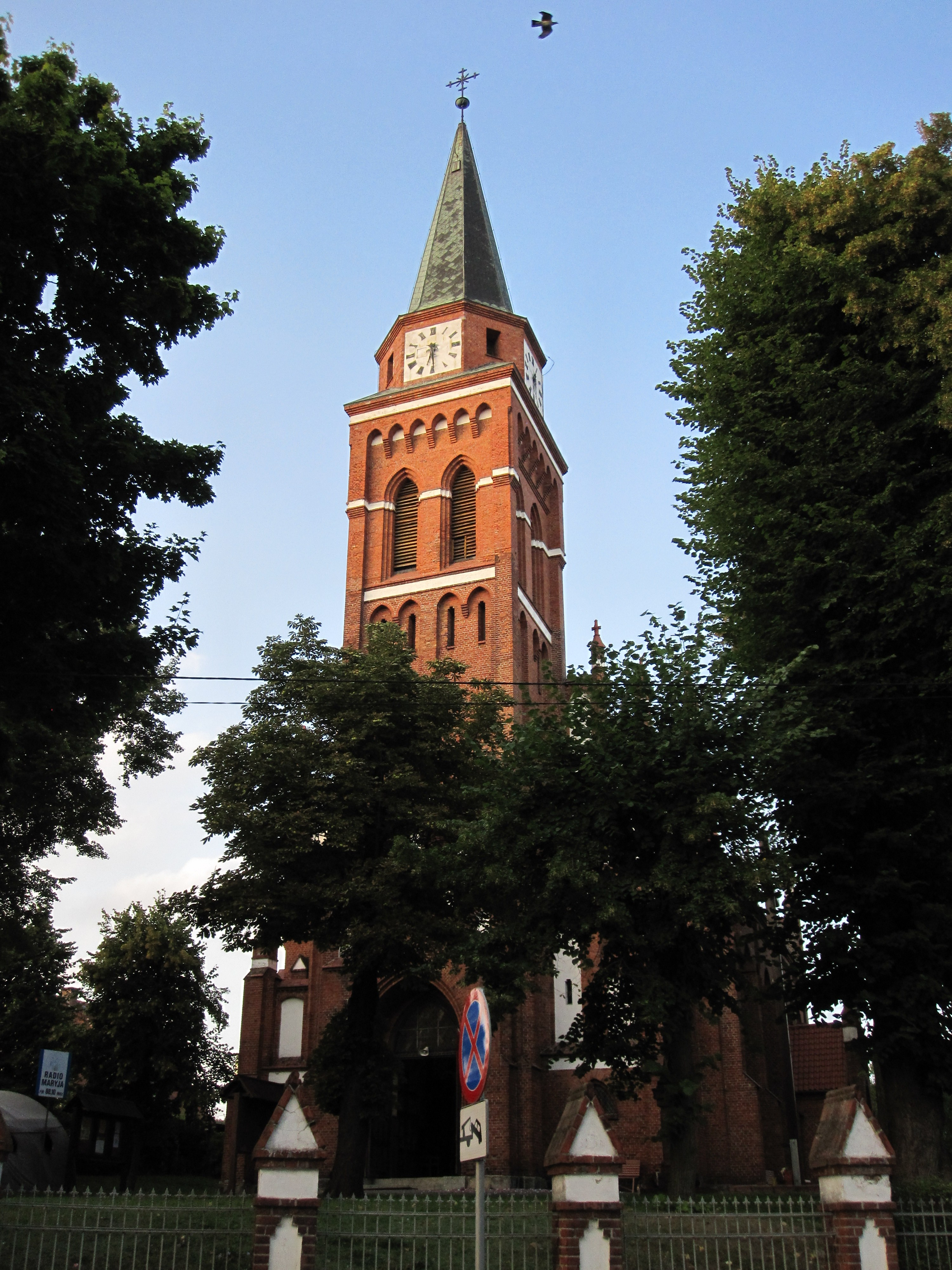
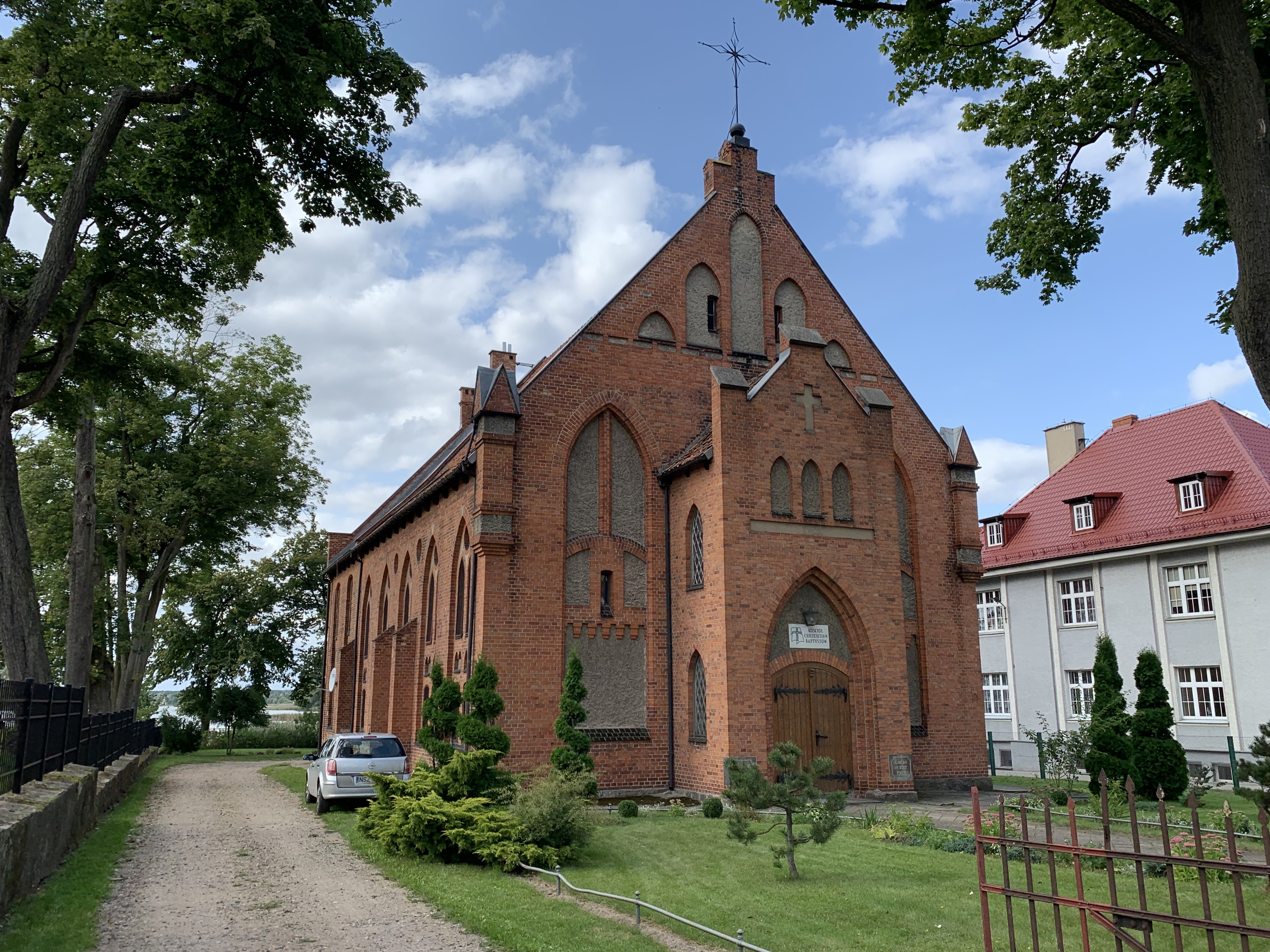
Gothic Revival churches of Szczytno: Church of the Assumption (left), Baptist Church (right)

During the interwar period, Polish-speaking residents of the region organized Samopomoc Mazurska ("Masurian Self-Help"), an organisation for the protection of Poles in southern East Prussia. A Polish activist Jerzy Lanc was killed during his attempt to establish a Polish school. Ortelsburg was the location of the Polish House, in which meetings of Polish journalists and activists were held. The Polish House was the headquarters of such organisations as "Zjednoczenie Mazurskie", "Samopomoc Mazurska" and the Union of Poles in Germany. Today the building is dedicated to the memory of the people and institutions that were engaged in Polish movement in Masuria. The Polish newspaper Mazurski Przyjaciel Ludu was published in the town in the 1920s. From 1926 to 1939, a new magazine for gromadkarze, Głos Ewangelijny, was issued here by Reinhold Barcz. Even before the invasion of Poland, the German authorities expelled two local Polish activists in January 1939, and later in 1939 more activists were arrested, including the Polish editor Robert Kraszewski and publicist Reinhold Barcz, who were later beheaded in the Moabit prison in Berlin. Some Polish activists managed to flee in the 1930s.

In the March 1933 German federal election, after the Nazi seizure of power and suppression of anti-Nazi political factions, the Nazi Party polled 76.6% of vote in Ortelsburg, compared to the national German average of only 43.9%.

=== World War II and post-war Poland ===
In October 1943, Polish partisans of the Home Army sabotaged a railroad turnout, causing two trains to collide. Near the end of World War II, most of the town's German population fled before the Red Army. Those who remained behind were either killed in the final months of the war or expelled after its end in accordance with the Potsdam Agreement. Some 47% of the town was destroyed, however, the most significant historic buildings survived. The town was placed under Polish administration in 1945 under border changes promulgated at the Potsdam Conference, renamed to the historic Polish Szczytno and gradually repopulated with Poles. The first group of Poles expelled from former Eastern Poland, which was annexed by the Soviet Union, arrived to Szczytno in June 1945 from Volhynia.

After the war, the town's life was organized anew. In 1946-1948 new schools were founded, including a pedagogical school, a vocational school and a school for kindergarten teachers. In 1947 a public library was founded and in 1954 a culture center was established. Since 1948, the town hall, besides the local administration, also houses the Masurian Museum in Szczytno (Muzeum Mazurskie w Szczytnie).

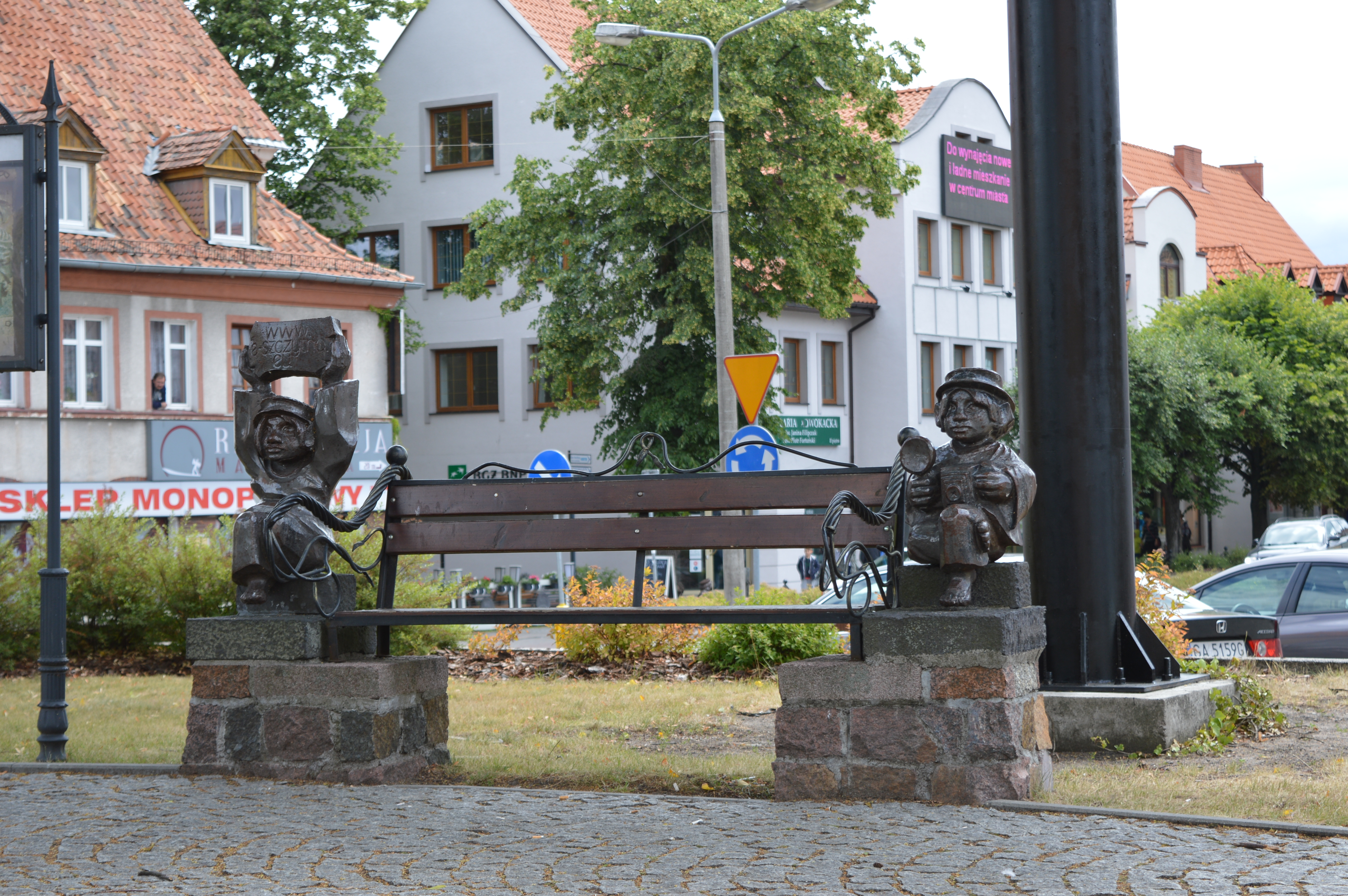
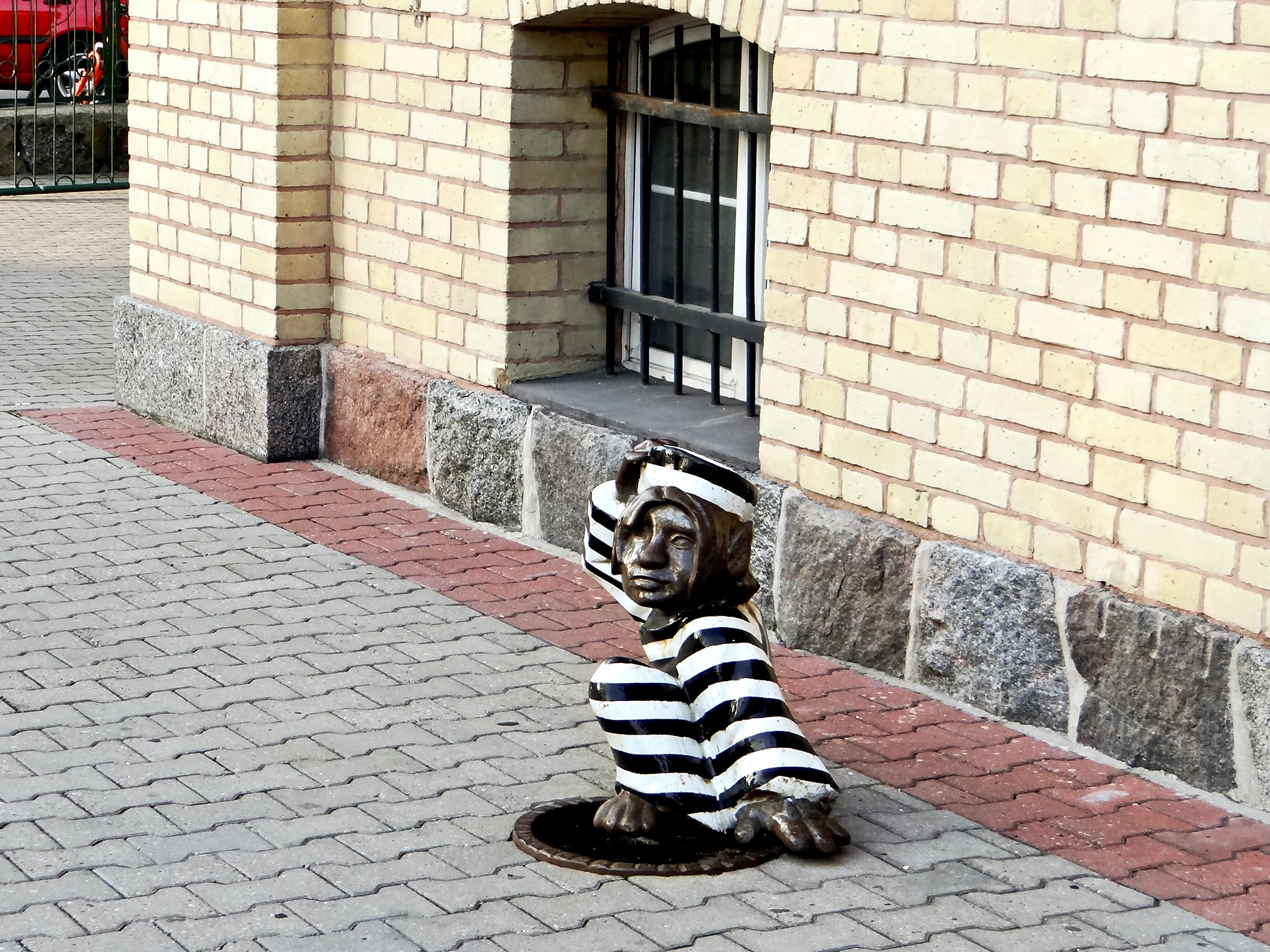
Szczytno's Pofajdoki (examples)

The nearby Szczytno-Szymany International Airport, as well as Stare Kiejkuty, a military intelligence training base, came under scrutiny in late 2005 as one of the suspected "black sites" (secret prisons or transfer stations) used in the CIA's program of so-called extraordinary rendition of accused terrorists. The existence of the nearby training base and the record of CIA-registered affiliated aircraft having landing at Szczytno-Szymany have been unequivocally confirmed, but the Polish government has repeatedly denied any involvement of these facilities in extraordinary renditions.

To commemorate old Masurian folk traditions, a number of Pofajdok sculptures were placed in Szczytno.

== Sights ==
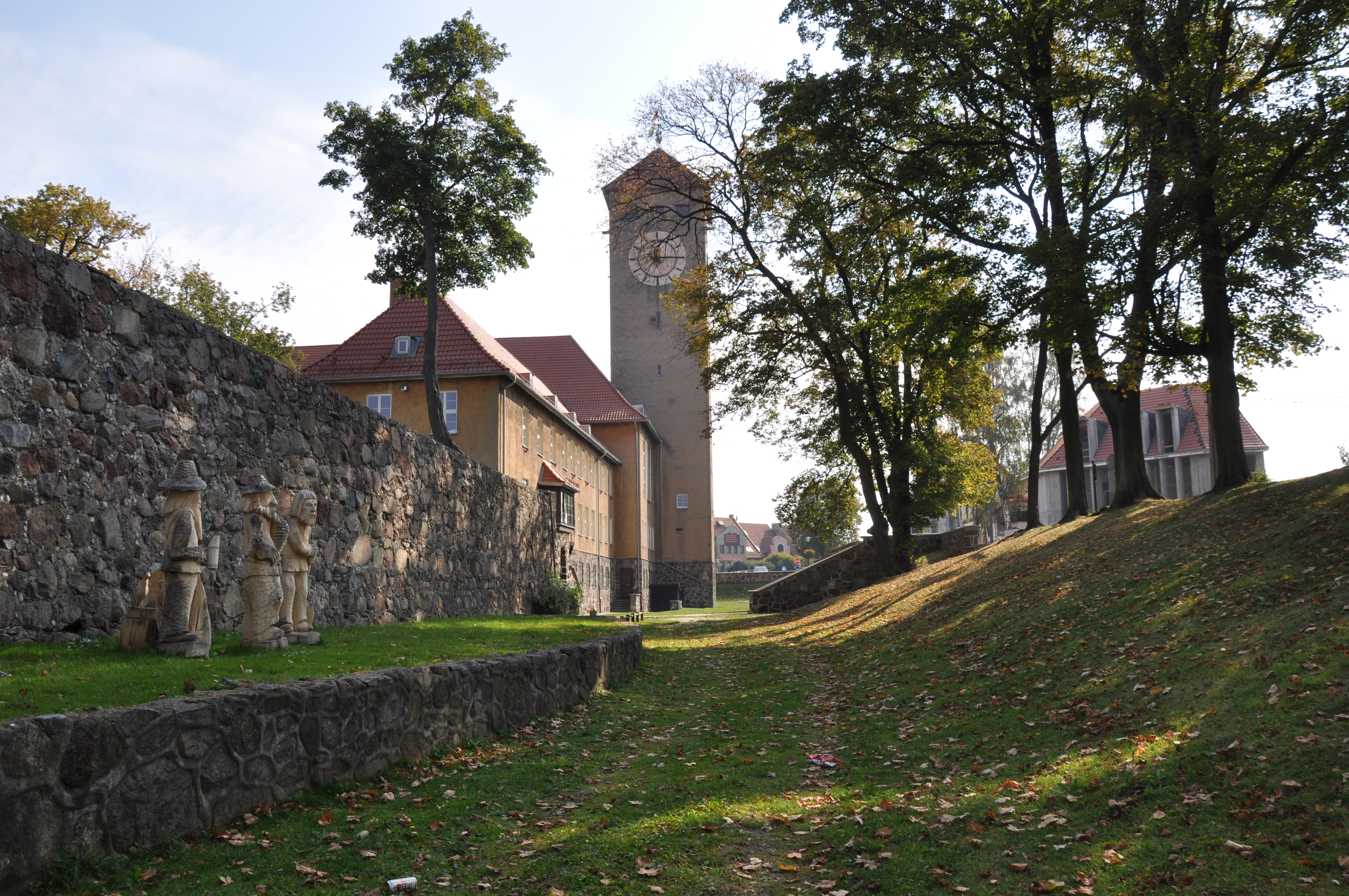
Castle wall and town hall tower in the town center

Among the historic sights of Szczytno are the ruins of the castle, the pre-war town hall, which houses the municipal and county authorities, as well as the Masurian Museum (Muzeum Mazurskie), dedicated to the history, ethnology and culture of Masuria and Szczytno, a Baroque Evangelical church, the pre-war Polish House (Dom Polski), which was the center of social and cultural life of the local Polish community during the times of Germanisation and the well-preserved old wooden Masurian House (Chata Mazurska). Also are located there the Gothic Revival Catholic Church of the Assumption and Baptist Church, the historic buildings of the district court, nursing home, tax office, police school, post office and former brewery.

== Sports ==
Football club SKS Szczytno (formerly Gwardia Szczytno) is based in the town. It played in the Polish second division in the 1980s.

== Notable residents ==
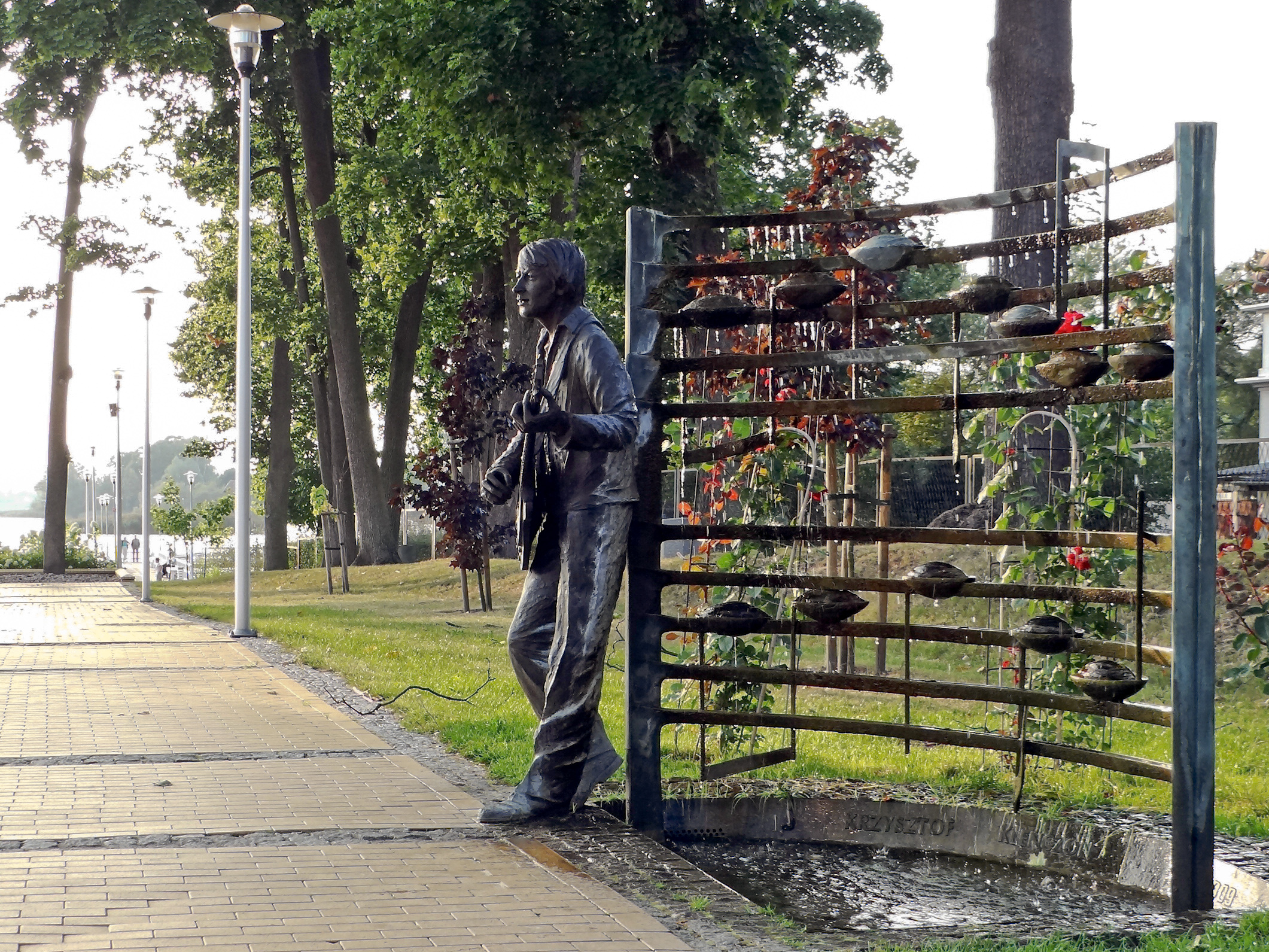
Monument of Krzysztof Klenczon

- Julie Salinger (1863–1942), politician
- Rose Scooler, née Guttfeld, (1882–1985), survivor of Theresienstadt concentration camp
- Hans Jürgen von der Wense (1894–1966) was a German poet, composer, photographer, aphorist and hiker
- Wolfgang Koeppen (1906–1996), German author, whose autobiographical film evoking a lost rural idyll, Es war einmal in Masuren, was set here
- Horst Kopkow (1910–1996), Nazi spy who cooperated with British intelligence after World War II
- Hansjoachim Linde (1926–2020), German general
- Hans-Peter Reinecke (1926–2003), German musicologist
- Christine Laszar (1931–2021), German actress
- Klaus Kilimann (1938–2024) is a physicist who became an SPD politician after 1989
- Krzysztof Klenczon (1942–1981), Polish musician
- Waldemar Kobus (born 1966), German actor
- Maurycy Stefanowicz (born 1976), Polish musician and guitarist
- Jakub Żulczyk (born 1983), Polish writer and journalist
- Konrad Bukowiecki (born 1997), Polish athlete competing primarily in the shot put

== Bibliography ==
- Biskup, Marian (1959). "Rozwój przestrzenny miasta Szczytna". Komunikaty Mazursko-Warmińskie (in Polish). No. 4.
