= Krzysztof Klenczon =

Polish musician (1942–1981)

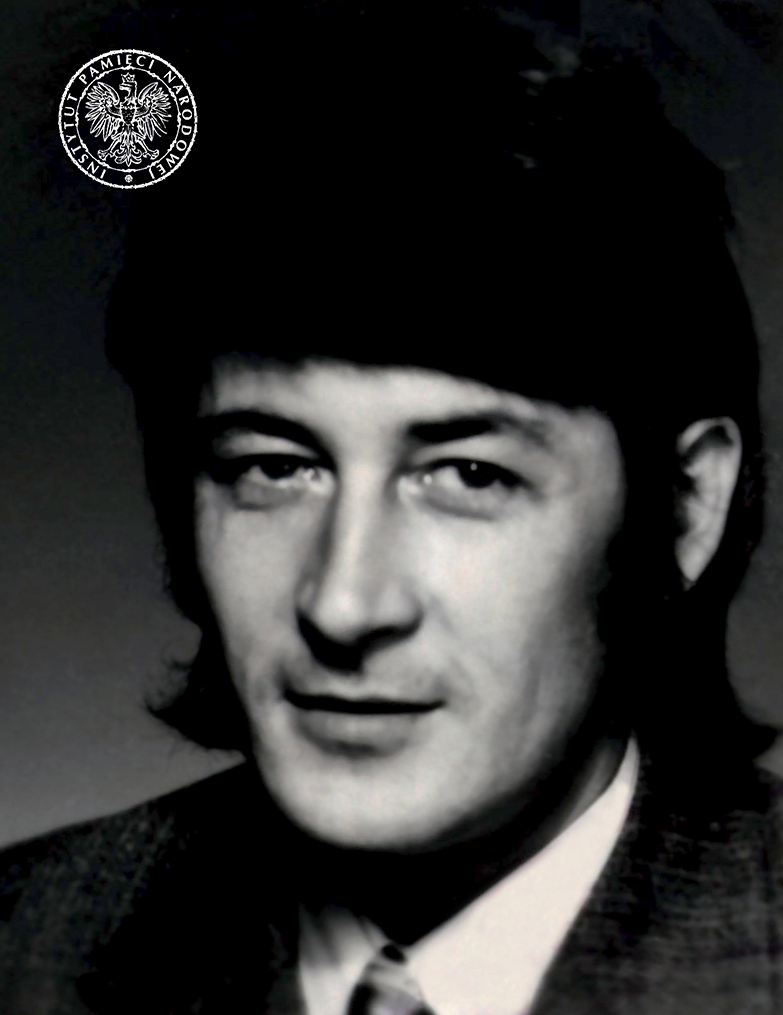
- Born: 14 January 1942; Pułtusk, Poland
- Died: 7 April 1981 (aged 39); Chicago, United States
- Years active: 1962–1981

Krzysztof Antoni Klenczon (14 January 1942 – 7 April 1981) was a Polish composer, singer and guitarist, and a member of Czerwone Gitary (1965–1970) and Trzy Korony (1970–1972).

Composer of the greatest hits of the Red Guitars (with Seweryn Krajewski) among others: Taka jak ty, Historia jednej znajomości, Nikt na świecie nie wie, Biały krzyż, Wróćmy na jeziora, Gdy kiedyś znów zawołam cię, Kwiaty we włosach, Powiedz stary gdzieś ty był, Jesień idzie przez park; and from Trzy Korony: 10 w skali Beauforta, Port, Czyjaś dziewczyna, Natalie-piękniejszy świat.

On 27 February 1981 Klenczon was seriously injured by a drunk driver in the suburbs of Chicago, on the way back from the Milford Ballroom in the city's Polish Village. He died on 7 April at St. Joseph's Hospital in Chicago, and was buried on 25 July 1981 in Szczytno, Poland in the family's plot.

== Solo discography ==
- (1971) Krzysztof Klenczon i Trzy Korony
- (1977) The Show Never Ends
- (1978) Powiedz Stary Gdzieś Ty Był
