= Rutkowski =

Surname

Rutkowski (feminine Rutkowska, plural: Rutkowscy) is a Polish toponymic surname denoting a person from the village of Rutki or Rutkowo.

== Related surnames ==
Language	Masculine	Feminine
Polish	Rutkowski	Rutkowska
Belarusian (Romanization)	Руткоўскі (Rutkoŭski, Rutkowski)	Руткоўская (Rutkouskaya, Rutkoŭskaja, Rutkowskaya)
Czech/Slovak	Rutkovský	Rutkovská
Hungarian	Rutkovszky, Rutkovszki	
Latvian	Rutkovskis	
Lithuanian	Rutkauskas	Rutkauskienė (married); Rutkauskaitė (unmarried)
Romanian/Moldovan	Rutcovschi, Rutcovschii	
Russian (Romanization)	Рутковский (Rutkovskiy, Rutkovskii, Rutkovskij, Rutkovsky, Rutkovski)	Рутковская (Rutkovskaya, Rutkovskaia, Rutkovskaja)
Ukrainian (Romanization)	Рутковський (Rutkovskyi, Rutkovskyy, Rutkovskyj, Rutkovsky)	Рутковська (Rutkovska)
Other	Rutkowsky, Rutkofsky, Rutkofski, Rutkow, Rutkosky	

== Notable people ==
- Anne-Françoise Rutkowski (born 1970), French psychologist
- Arnold Rutkowski, Polish opera singer
- Chris Rutkowski, Canadian ufologist and science writer
- Denise Rutkowski (born 1962), American bodybuilder
- Dick Rutkowski, American scientist working in hyperbaric medicine, diving medicine and diver training
- Ed Rutkowski (born 1941), American football player
- Jadwiga Rutkowska (1934–2004), Polish volleyball player
- Jerzy Rutkowski (1914–1989), Polish political activist and resistance soldier
- Joanna Rutkowska (born 1981), Polish computer security researcher
- Katarzyna Rutkowska (born 1994), Polish long-distance runner
- Krzysztof Rutkowski (born 1960), Polish detective and politician
- Louise Rutkowski (born 1964), Scottish singer
- Łukasz Rutkowski (born 1988), Polish ski jumper
- Mariusz Rutkowski (born 1963), Polish canoeist
- Mateusz Rutkowski, Polish ski jumper
- Michał Rutkowski (born 1959), Polish economist and World Bank official
- Natalia Rutkowska (born 1991), Polish cyclist
- Tadeusz Rutkowski (born 1951), Polish weightlifter
- Walter Rutkowski (1917–1975), American politician
- Wanda-Marie-Émilie Rutkowska (1872–1902), French actress
- Wolfgang Victor Ruttkowski (born 1935), Polish academic

== See also ==
- Rutkowski Glacier, glacier in Antarctica
