= Rusek =

Rusek may refer to:

== People ==
- Antonín Růsek (born 1999), Czech footballer
- Markus Rusek (born 1993), Austrian footballer
- Paweł Rusek (born 1983), Polish volleyball coach and player

== Places ==
- Rusek, Pomeranian Voivodeship, a village in northern Poland
- Rusek Wielki, a village in northeastern Poland
- Rusek Mały, a village in northeastern Poland
- Rusek, a part of Hradec Králové in the Czech Republic
