= Łupowo, Warmian-Masurian Voivodeship =

Łupowo
- Village
- Location within Poland
- Coordinates: 53°43′N 20°56′E
- Country: Poland
- Voivodeship: Warmian-Masurian
- County: Szczytno
- Gmina: Dźwierzuty
- Time zone: UTC+1 (CET)
  - Summer (DST): UTC+2 (CEST)
- Postal code: 12-120
- Vehicle registration: NSZ

Łupowo [wuˈpɔvɔ] is a village in the administrative district of Gmina Dźwierzuty, Szczytno County, Warmian-Masurian Voivodeship, in northern Poland. It is located in Masuria, approximately 2 km (1 mi) west of Dźwierzuty, 18 km (11 mi) north of Szczytno, and 30 km (19 mi) east of the regional capital Olsztyn.

The village was founded by Polish settlers by 1411. As of 1602 the population was almost entirely Polish, and in 1677 it was solely Polish. In 1610, Marcin Dymerski was recorded as the local innkeeper.
