= Targowska =

Targowska may refer to the following places in Poland:

- Targowska Wola
- Targowska Wólka
