= Michałki, Szczytno County =

Michałki
- Village
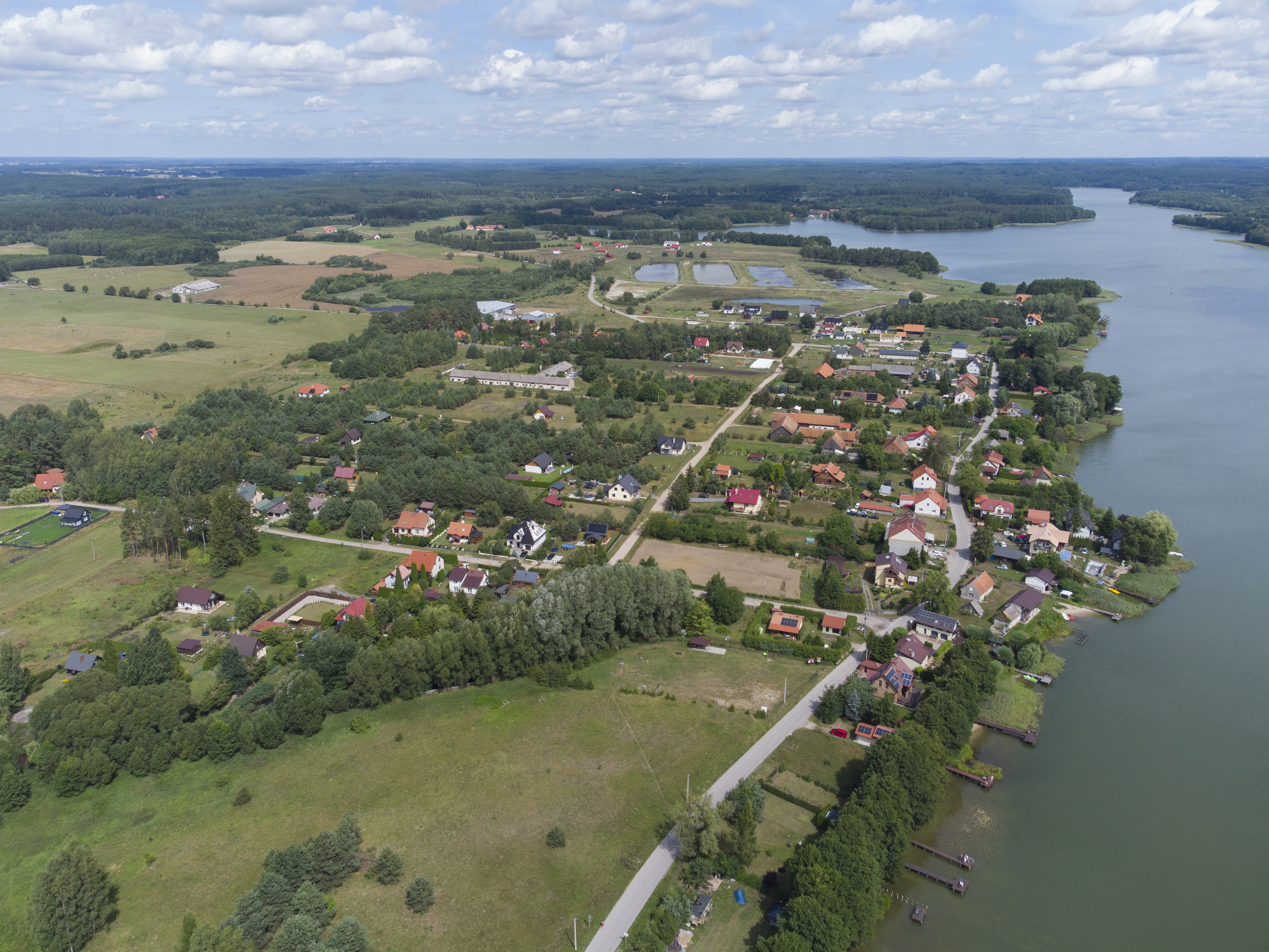

- Location within Poland
- Coordinates: 53°39′00″N 20°45′32″E
- Country: Poland
- Voivodeship: Warmian-Masurian
- County: Szczytno
- Gmina: Pasym
- Time zone: UTC+1 (CET)
  - Summer (DST): UTC+2 (CEST)
- Vehicle registration: NSZ

Michałki (Polish: [miˈxawkʲi]) is a village in the administrative district of Gmina Pasym, within Szczytno County, Warmian-Masurian Voivodeship, in northern Poland. It is located in Masuria, approximately 3 km (2 mi) north of Pasym, 18 km (11 mi) north-west of Szczytno, and 23 km (14 mi) south-east of the regional capital Olsztyn.

The Skrodzki Polish noble family lived in the village.
