= Małszewko =

- Village
- Location within Poland
- Coordinates: 53°42′N 20°53′E
- Country: Poland
- Voivodeship: Warmian-Masurian
- County: Szczytno
- Gmina: Dźwierzuty
- Population: 187

Małszewko [mau̯ˈʂɛfkɔ] (German: Malschöwen) is a village in the administrative district of Gmina Dźwierzuty, Szczytno County, Warmian-Masurian Voivodeship, in northern Poland.

The village has a population of 187.
