= Leleszki =

- Village
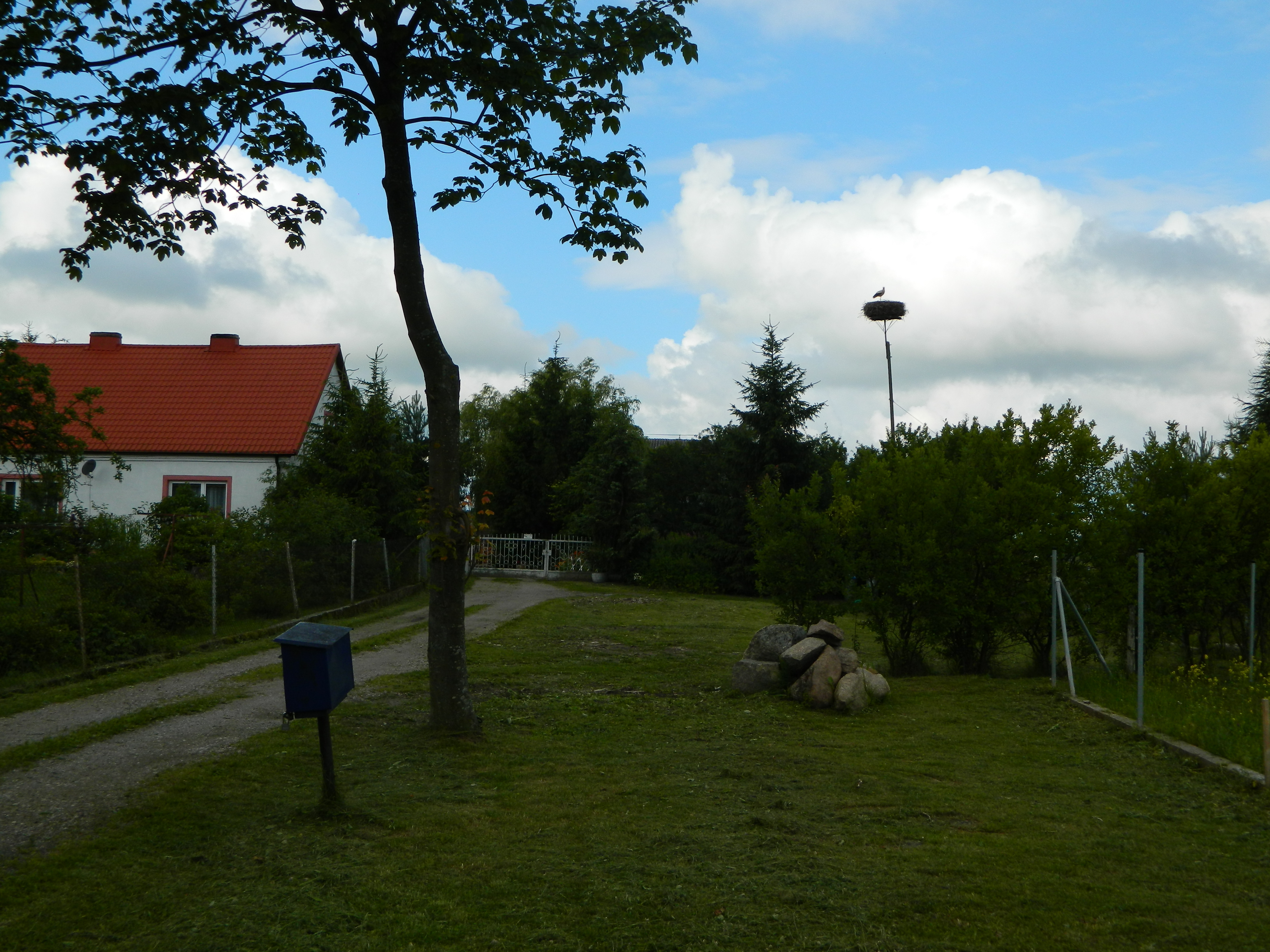

- Location within Poland
- Coordinates: 53°37′N 20°49′E
- Country: Poland
- Voivodeship: Warmian-Masurian
- County: Szczytno
- Gmina: Pasym
- Population: 231

Leleszki [lɛˈlɛʂki] (German: Lehlesken) is a village in the administrative district of Gmina Pasym, within Szczytno County, Warmian-Masurian Voivodeship, in northern Poland.

The village has a population of 231.
