= Przytuły, Szczytno County =

Przytuły
- Village
- Location within Poland
- Coordinates: 53°44′N 21°4′E
- Country: Poland
- Voivodeship: Warmian-Masurian
- County: Szczytno
- Gmina: Dźwierzuty
- Time zone: UTC+1 (CET)
  - Summer (DST): UTC+2 (CEST)
- Vehicle registration: NSZ

Przytuły [pʂɨˈtuwɨ] (German: Steinhöhe) is a village in the administrative district of Gmina Dźwierzuty, within Szczytno County, Warmian-Masurian Voivodeship, in northern Poland. It is located in Masuria.
