= Linowo =

Linowo may refer to the following places:

- Linowo, Kuyavian-Pomeranian Voivodeship (north-central Poland)
- Linowo, Gołdap County in Warmian-Masurian Voivodeship (north Poland)
- Linowo, Olsztyn County in Warmian-Masurian Voivodeship (north Poland)
- Linowo, Szczytno County in Warmian-Masurian Voivodeship (north Poland)
- Linowo, West Pomeranian Voivodeship (north-west Poland)
