= Augustowo, Warmian-Masurian Voivodeship =

Augustowo
- Village
- Location within Poland
- Coordinates: 53°44′44″N 20°59′11″E
- Country: Poland
- Voivodeship: Warmian-Masurian
- County: Szczytno
- Gmina: Dźwierzuty

Augustowo [auɡusˈtɔvɔ] (German: Augusthof) is a village in the administrative district of Gmina Dźwierzuty, within Szczytno County, Warmian-Masurian Voivodeship, in northern Poland.
