= Jurgi, Warmian-Masurian Voivodeship =

Jurgi
- Village
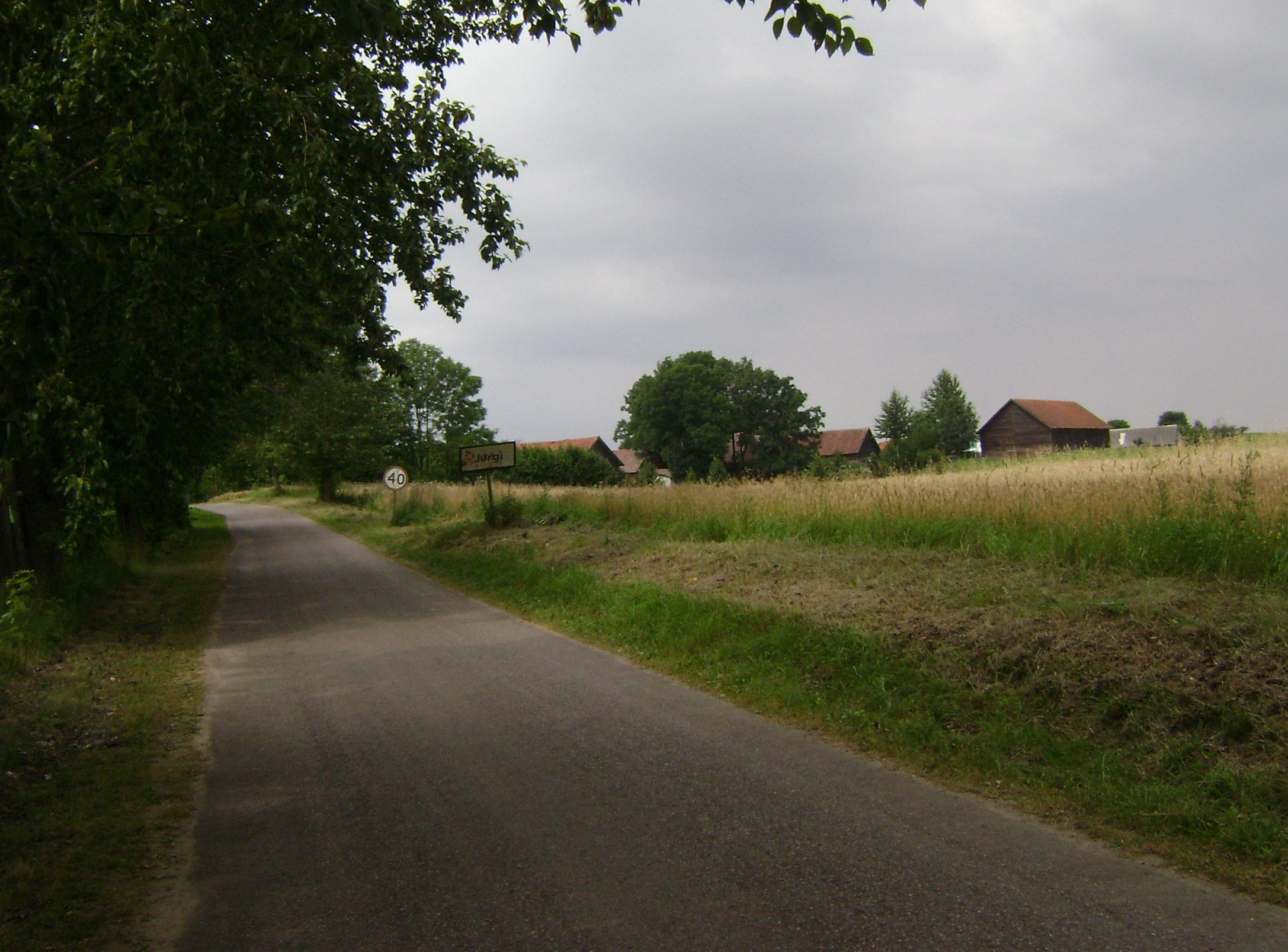

- Location within Poland
- Coordinates: 53°35′N 20°49′E
- Country: Poland
- Voivodeship: Warmian-Masurian
- County: Szczytno
- Gmina: Pasym

Jurgi [ˈjurɡi] (German: Georgensguth) is a village in the administrative district of Gmina Pasym, within Szczytno County, Warmian-Masurian Voivodeship, in northern Poland.
