= Otole =

- Settlement
- Location within Poland
- Coordinates: 53°41′N 20°49′E
- Country: Poland
- Voivodeship: Warmian-Masurian
- County: Szczytno
- Gmina: Pasym

Otole [ɔˈtɔlɛ] (German: Ottilienhof) is a settlement in the administrative district of Gmina Pasym, within Szczytno County, Warmian-Masurian Voivodeship, in northern Poland.
