= Dybowo, Szczytno County =

Dybowo
- Village
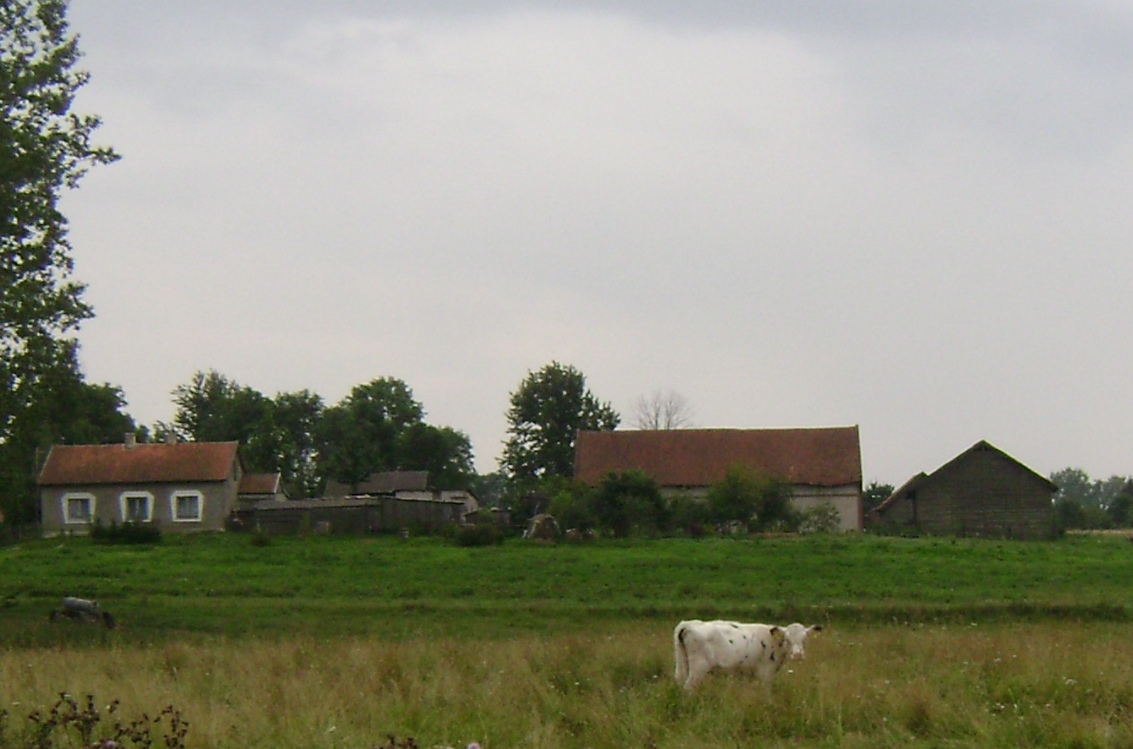

- Location within Poland
- Coordinates: 53°37′N 20°47′E
- Country: Poland
- Voivodeship: Warmian-Masurian
- County: Szczytno
- Gmina: Pasym
- Population: 212

Dybowo [dɨˈbɔvɔ] is a village in the administrative district of Gmina Pasym, within Szczytno County, Warmian-Masurian Voivodeship, in northern Poland.

The village has a population of 212.
