= Jabłonka, Szczytno County =

Jabłonka
- Village
- Location within Poland
- Coordinates: 53°39′N 21°1′E
- Country: Poland
- Voivodeship: Warmian-Masurian
- County: Szczytno
- Gmina: Dźwierzuty

Jabłonka [jaˈbwɔnka] (German: Jablonken; 1938–45: Wildenau) is a village in the administrative district of Gmina Dźwierzuty, within Szczytno County, Warmian-Masurian Voivodeship, in northern Poland.

== Notable residents ==
- Christoph Hartknoch (1644–1687), historian and educator
