= Budy, Warmian-Masurian Voivodeship =

Budy
- Village
- Location within Poland
- Coordinates: 53°42′N 20°55′E
- Country: Poland
- Voivodeship: Warmian-Masurian
- County: Szczytno
- Gmina: Dźwierzuty

Budy [ˈbudɨ] is a village in the administrative district of Gmina Dźwierzuty, within Szczytno County, Warmian-Masurian Voivodeship, in northern Poland.
