= Tylkówek =

- Settlement
- Location within Poland
- Coordinates: 53°37′12″N 20°43′08″E
- Country: Poland
- Voivodeship: Warmian-Masurian
- County: Szczytno
- Gmina: Pasym

Tylkówek [tɨlˈkuvɛk] (German: Scheufelsmühle) is a settlement in the administrative district of Gmina Pasym, within Szczytno County, Warmian-Masurian Voivodeship, in northern Poland.
