= Rańsk =

- Village
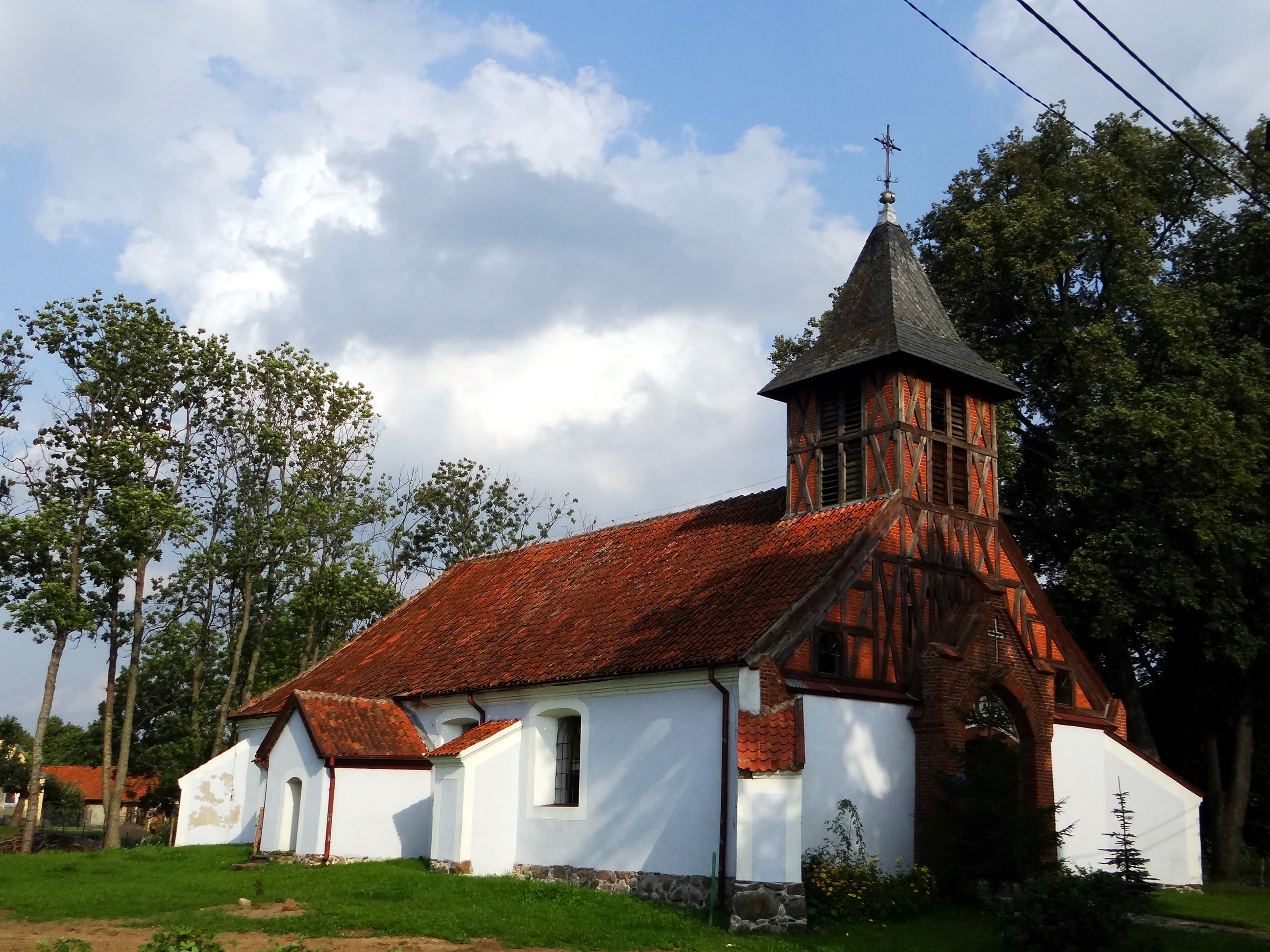
- Church in Rańsk

- Location within Poland
- Coordinates: 53°43′N 21°6′E
- Country: Poland
- Voivodeship: Warmian-Masurian
- County: Szczytno
- Gmina: Dźwierzuty
- Time zone: UTC+1 (CET)
  - Summer (DST): UTC+2 (CEST)
- Vehicle registration: NSZ

Rańsk [raɲsk] is a village in the administrative district of Gmina Dźwierzuty, within Szczytno County, Warmian-Masurian Voivodeship, in northern Poland. It is located in Masuria.
