= Miłuki, Szczytno County =

Miłuki
- Village
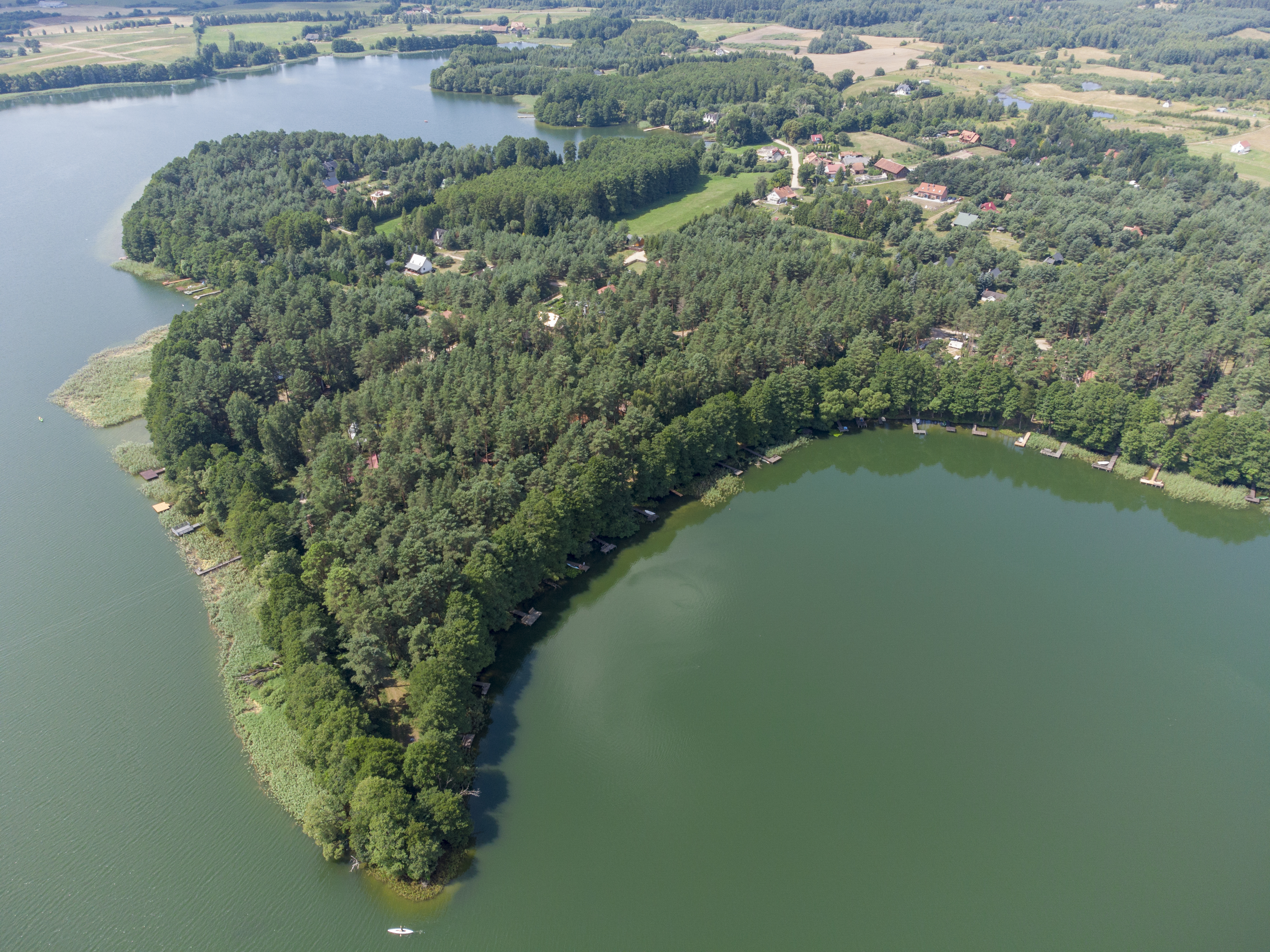

- Location within Poland
- Coordinates: 53°40′N 20°47′E
- Country: Poland
- Voivodeship: Warmian-Masurian
- County: Szczytno
- Gmina: Pasym

Miłuki [miˈwuki] (German: Milucken) is a village in the administrative district of Gmina Pasym, within Szczytno County, Warmian-Masurian Voivodeship, in northern Poland.
