= Mirowo, Warmian-Masurian Voivodeship =

Mirowo
- Village
- Location within Poland
- Coordinates: 53°41′18″N 20°57′13″E
- Country: Poland
- Voivodeship: Warmian-Masurian
- County: Szczytno
- Gmina: Dźwierzuty

Mirowo [miˈrɔvɔ] (German: Mirau) is a village in the administrative district of Gmina Dźwierzuty, within Szczytno County, Warmian-Masurian Voivodeship, in northern Poland.
