= Tylkowo =

- Village
- Location within Poland
- Coordinates: 53°39′N 20°46′E
- Country: Poland
- Voivodeship: Warmian-Masurian
- County: Szczytno
- Gmina: Pasym
- Population: 560

Tylkowo [tɨlˈkɔvɔ] (German: Scheufelsdorf) is a village in the administrative district of Gmina Pasym, within Szczytno County, Warmian-Masurian Voivodeship, in northern Poland.

The village has a population of 560.
