= Julianowo, Warmian-Masurian Voivodeship =

Julianowo
- Village
- Location within Poland
- Coordinates: 53°43′29″N 20°53′16″E
- Country: Poland
- Voivodeship: Warmian-Masurian
- County: Szczytno
- Gmina: Dźwierzuty
- Time zone: UTC+01:00 (CET)
  - Summer (DST): UTC+02:00 (CEST)

Julianowo [juljaˈnɔvɔ] (German: Julienfelde) is a village in the administrative district of Gmina Dźwierzuty, within Szczytno County, Warmian-Masurian Voivodeship, in northern Poland.
