= Dąbrowa, Gmina Dźwierzuty =

Dąbrowa
- Village
- Location within Poland
- Coordinates: 53°40′13″N 20°56′17″E
- Country: Poland
- Voivodeship: Warmian-Masurian
- County: Szczytno
- Gmina: Dźwierzuty

Dąbrowa [dɔmˈbrɔva] (German: Damerau) is a village in the administrative district of Gmina Dźwierzuty, within Szczytno County, Warmian-Masurian Voivodeship, in northern Poland.
