= Zimna Woda, Szczytno County =

Zimna Woda
- Village
- Location within Poland
- Coordinates: 53°40′6″N 21°8′5″E
- Country: Poland
- Voivodeship: Warmian-Masurian
- County: Szczytno
- Gmina: Dźwierzuty

Zimna Woda [ˈʑimna ˈvɔda] (German: Zimnawodda) is a village in the administrative district of Gmina Dźwierzuty, within Szczytno County, Warmian-Masurian Voivodeship, in northern Poland.
