= Pasym-Kolonie =

- Settlement
- Location within Poland
- Coordinates: 53°37′45″N 20°46′13″E
- Country: Poland
- Voivodeship: Warmian-Masurian
- County: Szczytno
- Gmina: Pasym

Pasym-Kolonie [ˈpasɨm kɔˈlɔɲɛ] is a settlement in the administrative district of Gmina Pasym, within Szczytno County, Warmian-Masurian Voivodeship, in northern Poland.
