= Łysa Góra, Warmian-Masurian Voivodeship =

Łysa Góra
- Village
- Location within Poland
- Coordinates: 53°40′N 20°56′E
- Country: Poland
- Voivodeship: Warmian-Masurian
- County: Szczytno
- Gmina: Pasym

Łysa Góra [ˈwɨsa ˈɡura] (German: Anhaltsberg) is a village in the administrative district of Gmina Pasym, within Szczytno County, Warmian-Masurian Voivodeship, in northern Poland.
