= Popowa Wola =

- Village
- Location within Poland
- Coordinates: 53°46′N 21°3′E
- Country: Poland
- Voivodeship: Warmian-Masurian
- County: Szczytno
- Gmina: Dźwierzuty

Popowa Wola [pɔˈpɔva ˈvɔla] (German: Pfaffendorf) is a village in the administrative district of Gmina Dźwierzuty, Szczytno County, Warmian-Masurian Voivodeship, in northern Poland.
