= Zazdrość, Szczytno County =

Zazdrość
- Village
- Location within Poland
- Coordinates: 53°43′N 21°0′E
- Country: Poland
- Voivodeship: Warmian-Masurian
- County: Szczytno
- Gmina: Dźwierzuty

Zazdrość [ˈzazdrɔɕt͡ɕ] (German: Louisenthal) is a village in the administrative district of Gmina Dźwierzuty, within Szczytno County, Warmian-Masurian Voivodeship, in northern Poland.
