= Mycielin, Warmian-Masurian Voivodeship =

Mycielin
- Village
- Location within Poland
- Coordinates: 53°44′N 20°53′E
- Country: Poland
- Voivodeship: Warmian-Masurian
- County: Szczytno
- Gmina: Dźwierzuty

Mycielin [mɨˈt͡ɕɛlin] (German: Mietzelchen) is a village in the administrative district of Gmina Dźwierzuty, within Szczytno County, Warmian-Masurian Voivodeship, in northern Poland.
