= Olszewki =

- Village
- Location within Poland
- Coordinates: 53°41′N 20°59′E
- Country: Poland
- Voivodeship: Warmian-Masurian
- County: Szczytno
- Gmina: Dźwierzuty

Olszewki [ɔlˈʂɛfki] (German: Olschöwken; 1938-45: Kornau) is a village in the administrative district of Gmina Dźwierzuty, within Szczytno County, Warmian-Masurian Voivodeship, in northern Poland.
