= Nowe Kiejkuty =

- Village
- Location within Poland
- Coordinates: 53°38′N 21°2′E
- Country: Poland
- Voivodeship: Warmian-Masurian
- County: Szczytno
- Gmina: Dźwierzuty
- Population: 300

Nowe Kiejkuty [ˈnɔvɛ kʲɛi̯ˈkutɨ] (German: Neu Keykuth) is a village in the administrative district of Gmina Dźwierzuty, within Szczytno County, Warmian-Masurian Voivodeship, in northern Poland.

The village has a population of 300.
