= Śledzie, Warmian-Masurian Voivodeship =

Śledzie
- Village
- Location within Poland
- Coordinates: 53°44′N 21°7′E
- Country: Poland
- Voivodeship: Warmian-Masurian
- County: Szczytno
- Gmina: Dźwierzuty

Śledzie [ˈɕlɛd͡ʑɛ] (German: Heering) is a village in the administrative district of Gmina Dźwierzuty, within Szczytno County, Warmian-Masurian Voivodeship, in northern Poland.
