= Szczepankowo, Szczytno County =

Szczepankowo
- Village
- Location within Poland
- Coordinates: 53°44′N 20°58′E
- Country: Poland
- Voivodeship: Warmian-Masurian
- County: Szczytno
- Gmina: Dźwierzuty

Szczepankowo [ʂt͡ʂɛpanˈkɔvɔ] (German: Stauchwitz) is a village in the administrative district of Gmina Dźwierzuty, within Szczytno County, Warmian-Masurian Voivodeship, in northern Poland.
