= Grodziska, Warmian-Masurian Voivodeship =

Village in Warmian-Masurian Voivodeship, Poland

Grodziska
- Village
- Location within Poland
- Coordinates: 53°44′N 21°2′E
- Country: Poland
- Voivodeship: Warmian-Masurian
- County: Szczytno
- Gmina: Dźwierzuty

Grodziska [ɡrɔˈd͡ʑiska] (German: Grodzisken; 1938-45: Burggarten) is a village in the administrative district of Gmina Dźwierzuty, within Szczytno County, Warmian-Masurian Voivodeship, in northern Poland.
