= Rów, Warmian-Masurian Voivodeship =

Rów
- Village
- Location within Poland
- Coordinates: 53°41′42″N 21°07′43″E
- Country: Poland
- Voivodeship: Warmian-Masurian
- County: Szczytno
- Gmina: Dźwierzuty

Rów [ruf] (German: Rowmühle) is a village in the administrative district of Gmina Dźwierzuty, within Szczytno County, Warmian-Masurian Voivodeship, in northern Poland.
