= Targowo =

- Village
- Location within Poland
- Coordinates: 53°42′N 21°2′E
- Country: Poland
- Voivodeship: Warmian-Masurian
- County: Szczytno
- Gmina: Dźwierzuty

Targowo [tarˈɡɔvɔ] (German: Theerwisch) is a village in the administrative district of Gmina Dźwierzuty, within Szczytno County, Warmian-Masurian Voivodeship, in northern Poland.
