= Miętkie, Warmian-Masurian Voivodeship =

Miętkie
- Village
- Location within Poland
- Coordinates: 53°40′N 21°6′E
- Country: Poland
- Voivodeship: Warmian-Masurian
- County: Szczytno
- Gmina: Dźwierzuty

Miętkie [ˈmjɛntkʲɛ] (German: Mingfen) is a village in the administrative district of Gmina Dźwierzuty, within Szczytno County, Warmian-Masurian Voivodeship, in northern Poland.
