= Laurentowo =

- Village
- Location within Poland
- Coordinates: 53°44′40″N 20°56′07″E
- Country: Poland
- Voivodeship: Warmian-Masurian
- County: Szczytno
- Gmina: Dźwierzuty

Laurentowo [laurɛnˈtɔvɔ] is a village in the administrative district of Gmina Dźwierzuty, within Szczytno County, Warmian-Masurian Voivodeship, in northern Poland.
