= Rumy =

- Village
- Location within Poland
- Coordinates: 53°46′N 20°56′E
- Country: Poland
- Voivodeship: Warmian-Masurian
- County: Szczytno
- Gmina: Dźwierzuty

Rumy [ˈrumɨ] (German: Rummy A) is a village in the administrative district of Gmina Dźwierzuty, within Szczytno County, Warmian-Masurian Voivodeship, in northern Poland.

During the period from 1938 to 1945, Nazi Germany used the name "Rumnau" for the village.
