= Narajty =

- Village
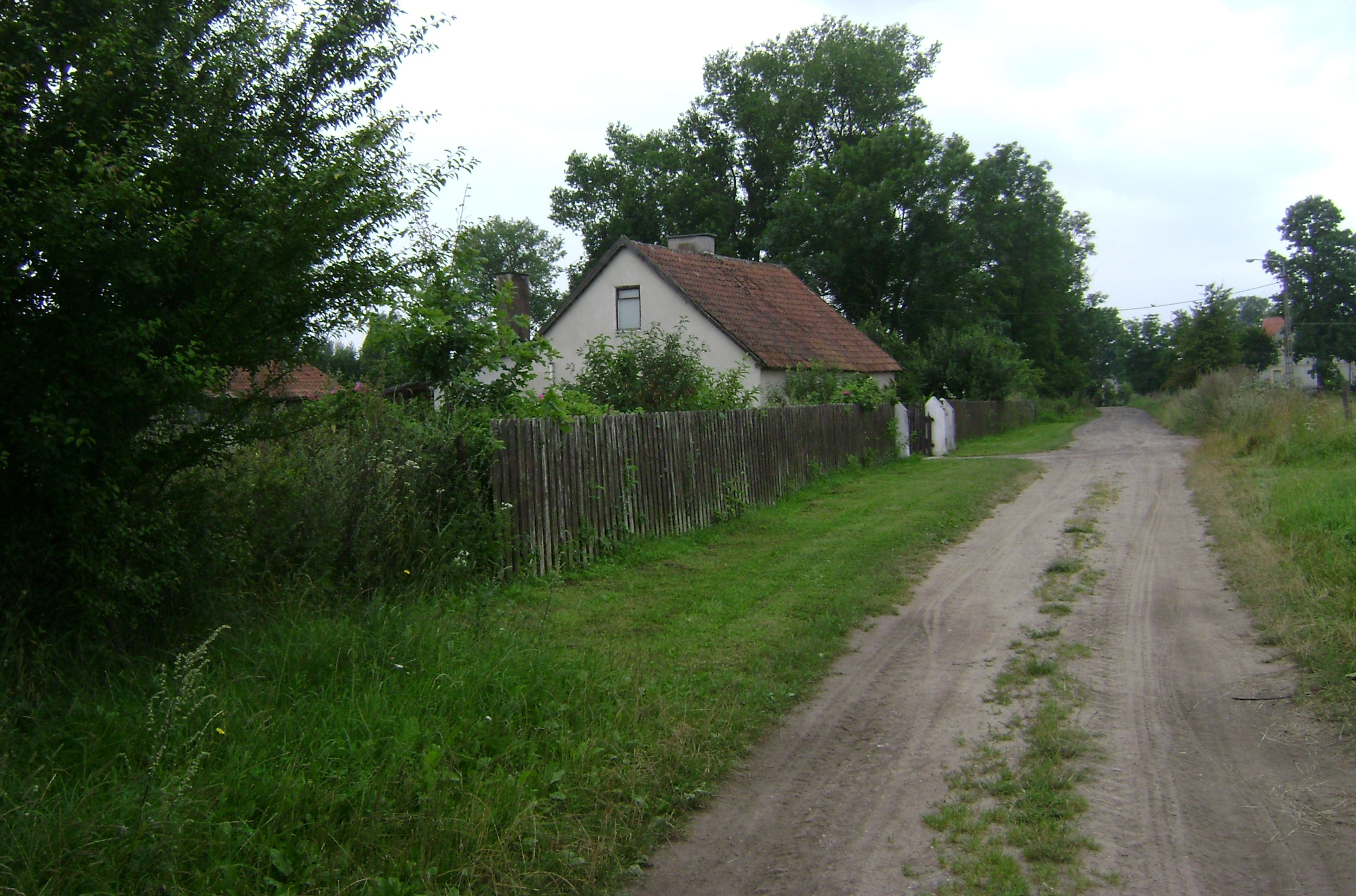

- Location within Poland
- Coordinates: 53°36′N 20°45′E
- Country: Poland
- Voivodeship: Warmian-Masurian
- County: Szczytno
- Gmina: Pasym

Narajty [naˈrai̯tɨ] is a village in the administrative district of Gmina Pasym, within Szczytno County, Warmian-Masurian Voivodeship, in northern Poland.

== Demographics ==
The demographic structure as of 31 March 2011:

	Total	Pre-working age	Working age	Post-working age
Men	78	21	52	5
Women	59	17	33	9
Total	137	38	85	14
