= Rudziska Pasymskie =

- Village
- Location within Poland
- Coordinates: 53°41′16″N 20°47′13″E
- Country: Poland
- Voivodeship: Warmian-Masurian
- County: Szczytno
- Gmina: Pasym

Rudziska Pasymskie [ruˈd͡ʑiska paˈsɨmskʲɛ] (German: Waldheim) is a village in the administrative district of Gmina Pasym, within Szczytno County, Warmian-Masurian Voivodeship, in northern Poland.
