= Jeleniowo =

- Village
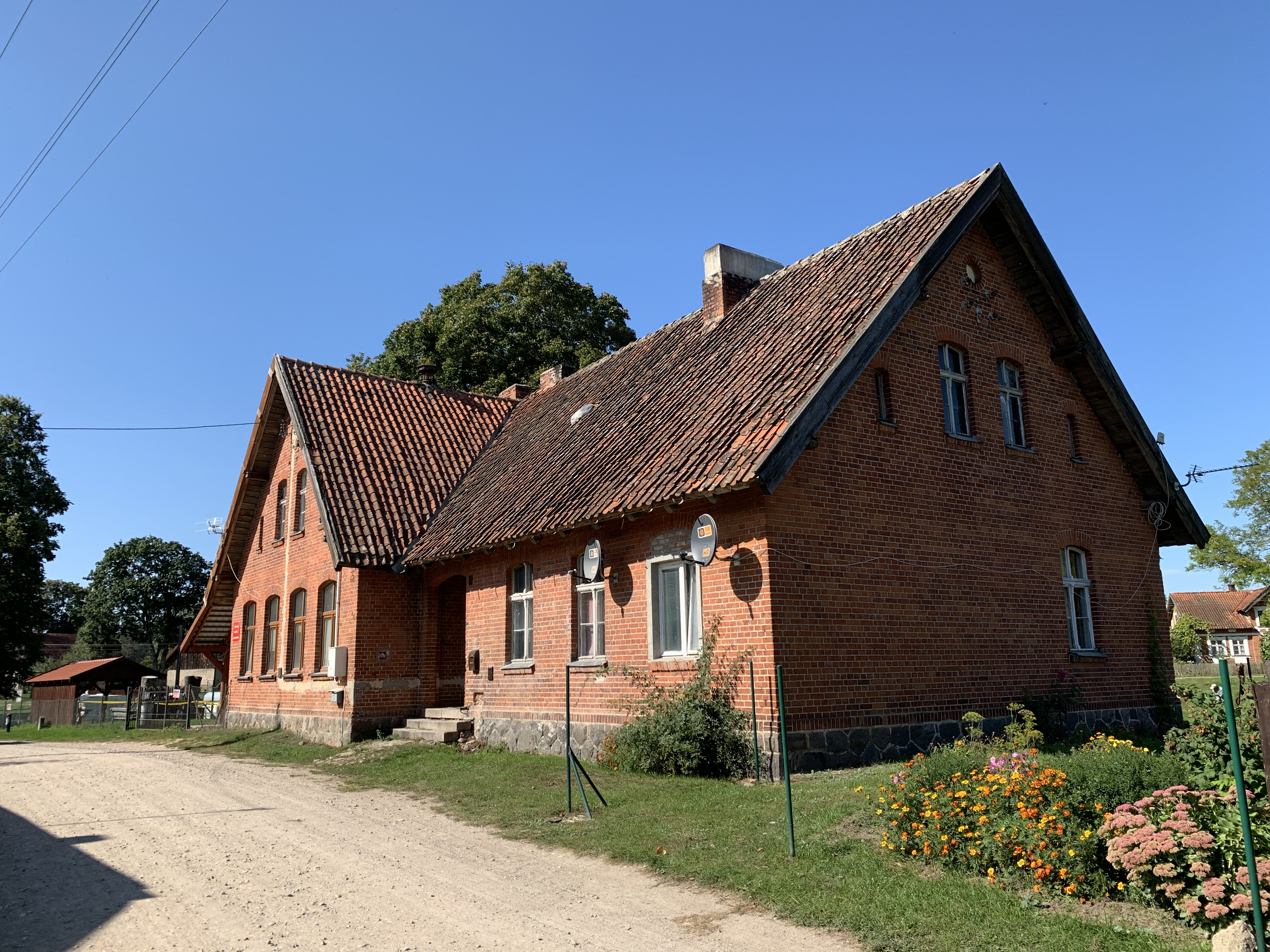
- Former school

- Location within Poland
- Coordinates: 53°41′27″N 21°9′24″E
- Country: Poland
- Voivodeship: Warmian-Masurian
- County: Szczytno
- Gmina: Dźwierzuty

Population
  - Total: 210

Jeleniowo [jɛlɛˈɲɔvɔ] (German: Jellinowen) is a village in the administrative district of Gmina Dźwierzuty, within Szczytno County, Warmian-Masurian Voivodeship, in northern Poland.

The village was founded in 1579 based on Kulm law within the Duchy of Prussia, later becoming part of Kingdom of Prussia, German Empire, Weimar Republic and Nazi Germany.

The village has a population of 210.
