= Grądy, Szczytno County =

Grądy
- Village
- Location within Poland
- Coordinates: 53°43′N 21°5′E
- Country: Poland
- Voivodeship: Warmian-Masurian
- County: Szczytno
- Gmina: Dźwierzuty

Population
  - Total: 169
- Time zone: UTC+1 (CET)
  - Summer (DST): UTC+2 (CEST)
- Vehicle registration: NSZ

Grądy [ˈɡrɔndɨ] is a village in the administrative district of Gmina Dźwierzuty, within Szczytno County, Warmian-Masurian Voivodeship, in northern Poland.

It is located in Masuria.

The village has a population of 169.
