= Grom, Warmian-Masurian Voivodeship =

Grom
- Village
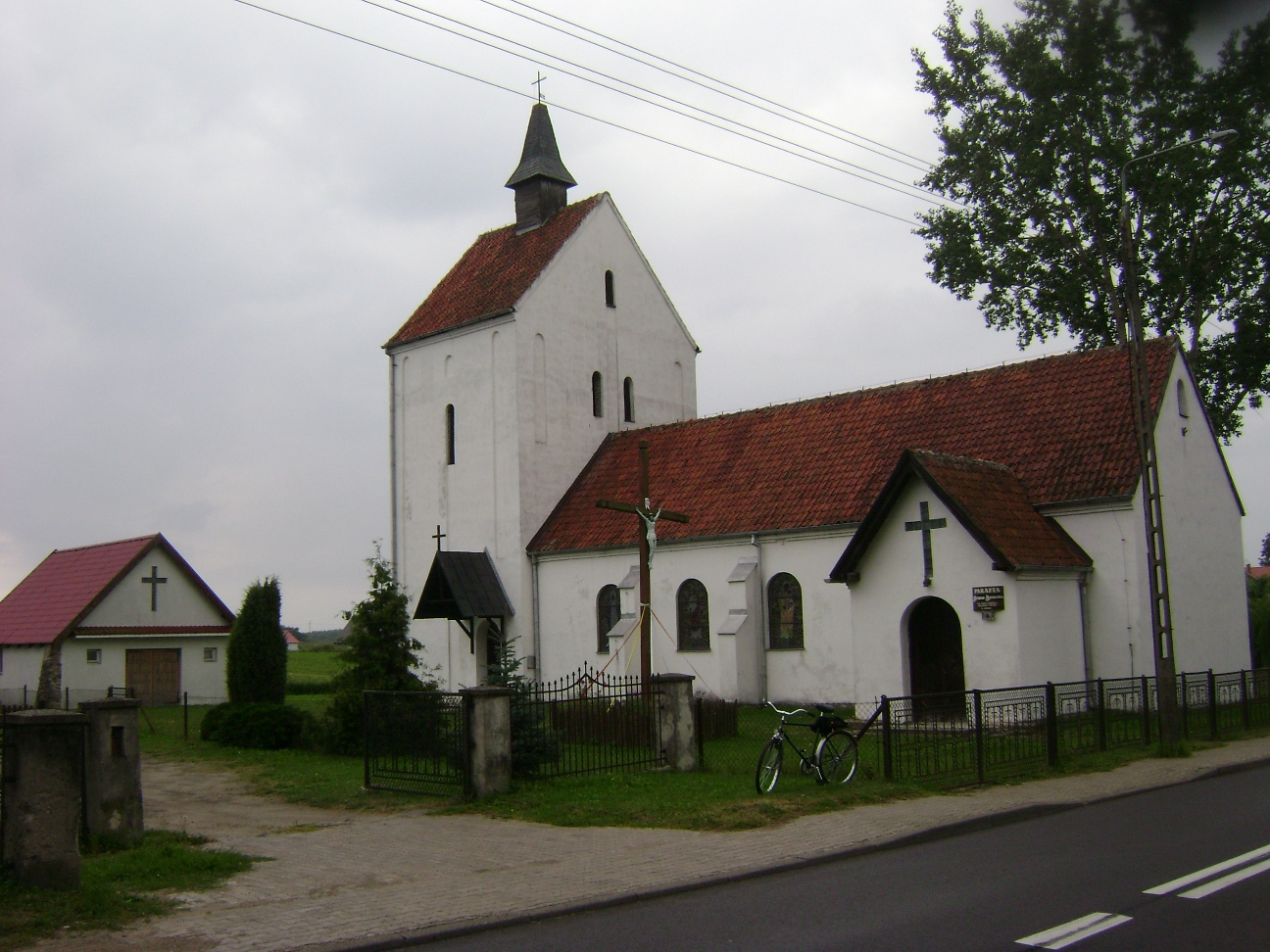

- Location within Poland
- Coordinates: 53°36′N 20°51′E
- Country: Poland
- Voivodeship: Warmian-Masurian
- County: Szczytno
- Gmina: Pasym

Grom [ɡrɔm] (German: Grammen) is a village in the administrative district of Gmina Pasym, within Szczytno County, Warmian-Masurian Voivodeship, in northern Poland.
