= Siedliska, Szczytno County =

Siedliska
- Village
- Location within Poland
- Coordinates: 53°41′N 20°50′E
- Country: Poland
- Voivodeship: Warmian-Masurian
- County: Szczytno
- Gmina: Pasym

Siedliska [ɕɛdˈlʲiska] (German: Freythen) is a village in the administrative district of Gmina Pasym, within Szczytno County, Warmian-Masurian Voivodeship, in northern Poland.
