= Kałęczyn, Warmian-Masurian Voivodeship =

Kałęczyn
- Village
- Location within Poland
- Coordinates: 53°43′8″N 21°4′37″E
- Country: Poland
- Voivodeship: Warmian-Masurian
- County: Szczytno
- Gmina: Dźwierzuty

Kałęczyn [kaˈwɛnt͡ʂɨn] (German: Kallenau) is a village in the administrative district of Gmina Dźwierzuty, within Szczytno County, Warmian-Masurian Voivodeship, in northern Poland.
