= Babięty =

- Village
- Location within Poland
- Coordinates: 53°43′25″N 21°8′58″E
- Country: Poland
- Voivodeship: Warmian-Masurian
- County: Szczytno
- Gmina: Dźwierzuty
- Population: 10

Babięty [baˈbjɛntɨ] (German: Babanten) is a village in the administrative district of Gmina Dźwierzuty, Szczytno County, Warmian-Masurian Voivodeship, in northern Poland.

The village has a population of 10.
