= Rogale, Szczytno County =

Rogale
- Village
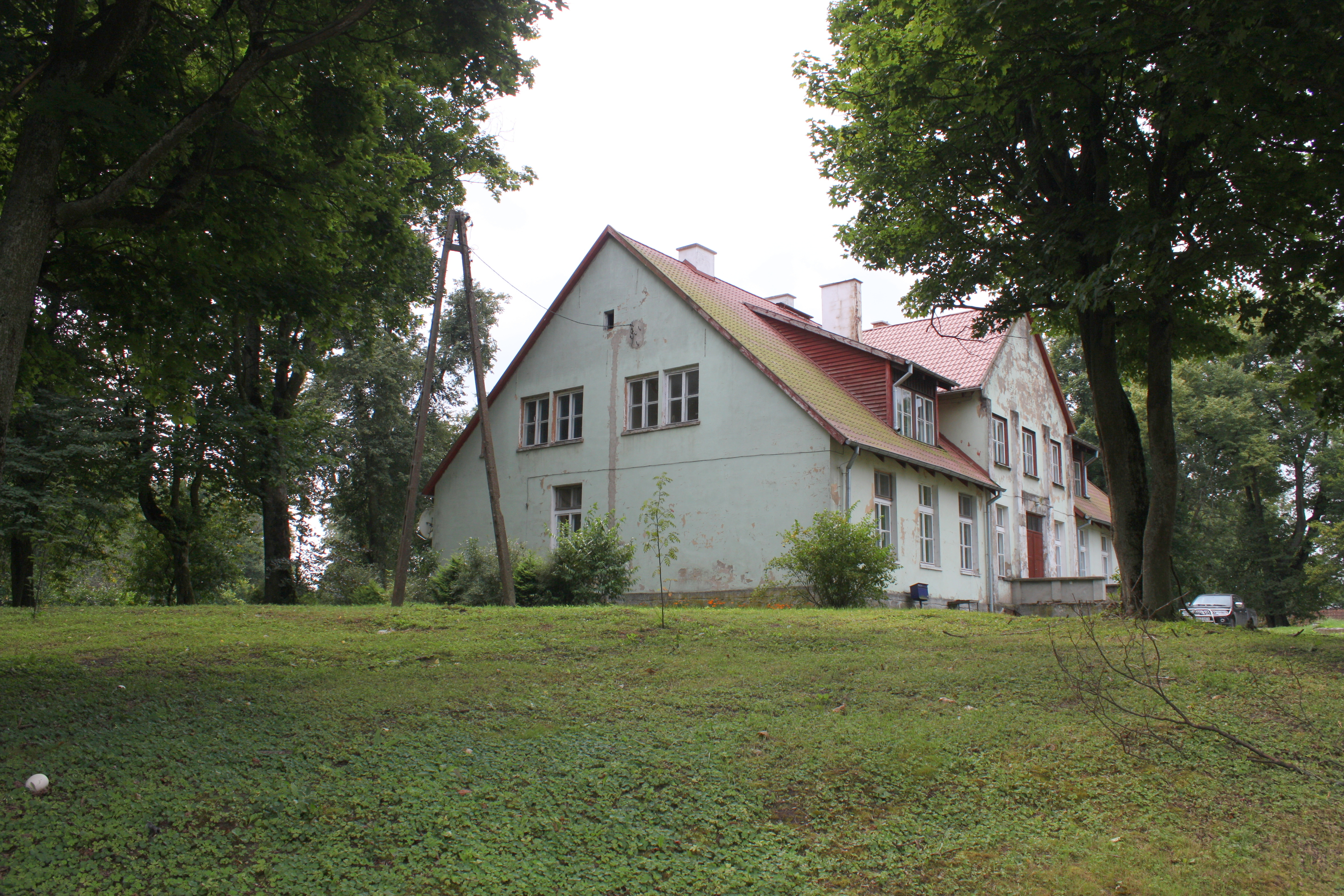
- Old manor house in Rogale

- Location within Poland
- Coordinates: 53°45′N 21°5′E
- Country: Poland
- Voivodeship: Warmian-Masurian
- County: Szczytno
- Gmina: Dźwierzuty
- Time zone: UTC+1 (CET)
  - Summer (DST): UTC+2 (CEST)
- Vehicle registration: NSZ

Rogale [rɔˈɡalɛ] (German: Rogallen; 1938–45: Rogenau) is a village in the administrative district of Gmina Dźwierzuty, within Szczytno County, Warmian-Masurian Voivodeship, in northern Poland. It is located in the region of Masuria.

The village was founded by 1436.
