= Gisiel, Warmian-Masurian Voivodeship =

Gisiel
- Village
- Location within Poland
- Coordinates: 53°45′N 20°59′E
- Country: Poland
- Voivodeship: Warmian-Masurian
- County: Szczytno
- Gmina: Dźwierzuty
- Population: 94

Gisiel [ˈɡiɕɛl] is a village in the administrative district of Gmina Dźwierzuty, Szczytno County, Warmian-Masurian Voivodeship, in northern Poland.

The village has a population of 94.
