= Stankowo, Szczytno County =

Stankowo
- Village
- Location within Poland
- Coordinates: 53°39′44″N 20°58′42″E
- Country: Poland
- Voivodeship: Warmian-Masurian
- County: Szczytno
- Gmina: Dźwierzuty
- Population: 130

Stankowo [stanˈkɔvɔ] (German: Probeberg) is a village in the administrative district of Gmina Dźwierzuty, within Szczytno County, Warmian-Masurian Voivodeship, in northern Poland.

The village has a population of 130.
