= Zalesie, Szczytno County =

Zalesie
- Village
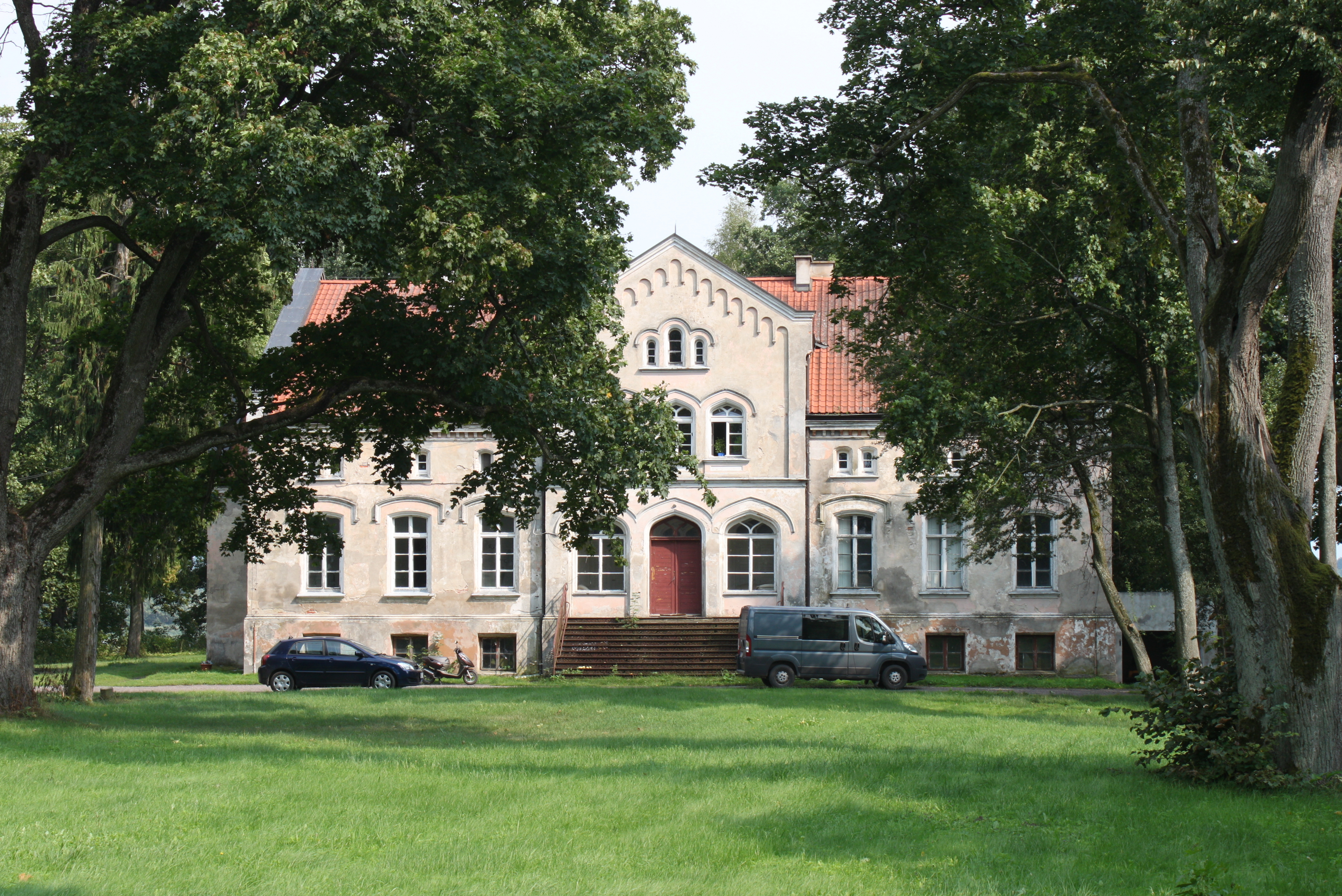
- Old manor in Zalesie

- Location within Poland
- Coordinates: 53°42′49″N 21°4′18″E
- Country: Poland
- Voivodeship: Warmian-Masurian
- County: Szczytno
- Gmina: Dźwierzuty
- Time zone: UTC+1 (CET)
  - Summer (DST): UTC+2 (CEST)
- Vehicle registration: NSZ

Zalesie [zaˈlɛɕɛ] (German: Salleschen; 1938-45: Ingelheim) is a village in the administrative district of Gmina Dźwierzuty, within Szczytno County, Warmian-Masurian Voivodeship, in northern Poland.
