= Krzywonoga =

- Village
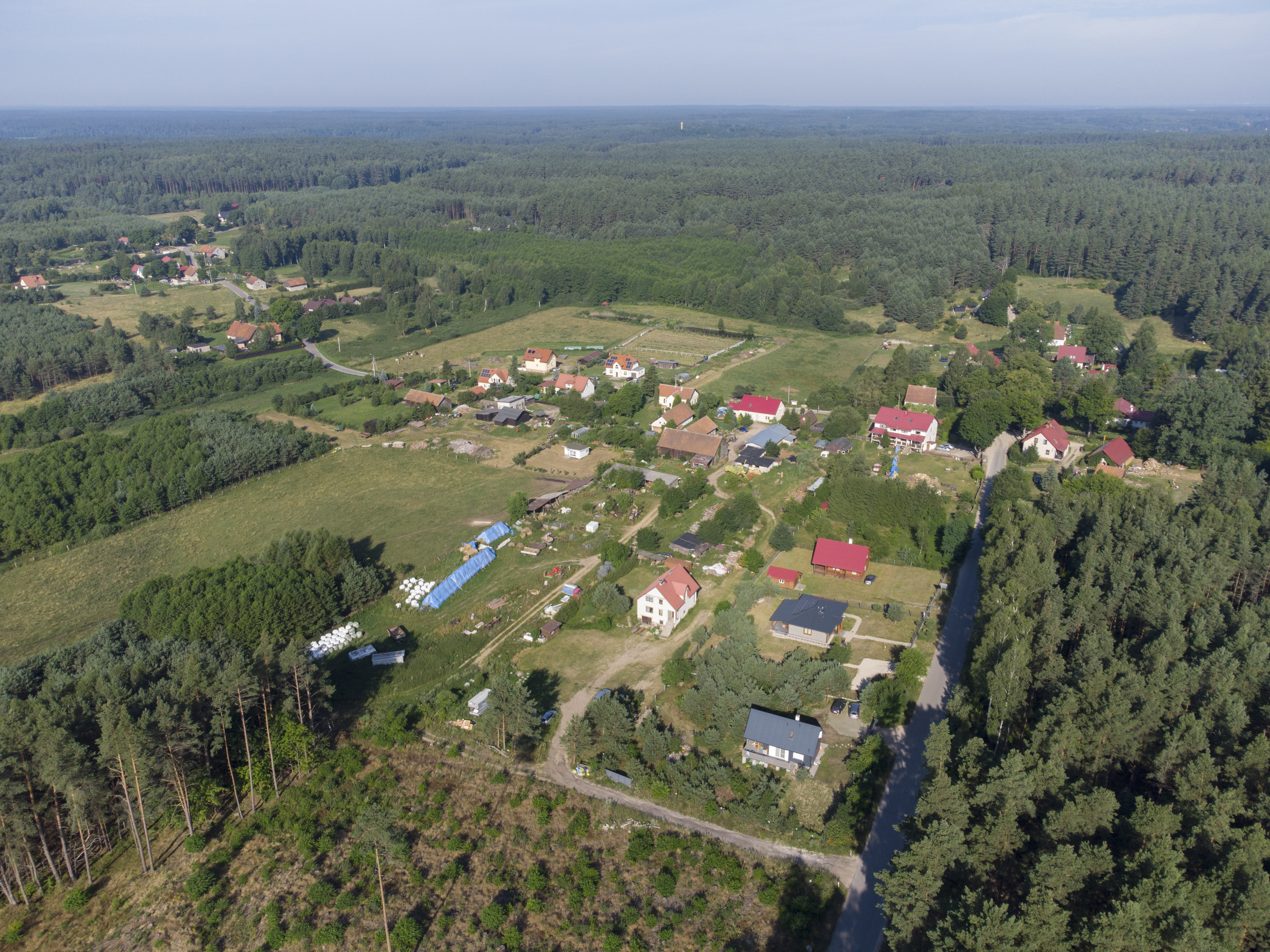
- A view from east

- Location within Poland
- Coordinates: 53°41′N 20°44′E
- Country: Poland
- Voivodeship: Warmian-Masurian
- County: Szczytno
- Gmina: Pasym
- Time zone: UTC+1 (CET)
  - Summer (DST): UTC+2 (CEST)
- Vehicle registration: NSZ

Krzywonoga [kʂɨvɔˈnɔɡa] (formerly German: Krummfuss) is a village in the administrative district of Gmina Pasym, within Szczytno County, Warmian-Masurian Voivodeship, in northern Poland.
