= Grzegrzółki =

- Village
- Location within Poland
- Coordinates: 53°40′N 20°51′E
- Country: Poland
- Voivodeship: Warmian-Masurian
- County: Szczytno
- Gmina: Pasym

Grzegrzółki [ɡʐɛˈɡʐuu̯ki] (German: Kukukswalde) is a village in the administrative district of Gmina Pasym, within Szczytno County, Warmian-Masurian Voivodeship, in northern Poland.
