= Słonecznik =

Słonecznik may refer to:

- Słonecznik, Polish word for Helianthus
- Słonecznik, Ostróda County, a village in Warmian-Masurian Voivodeship, Poland
- Słonecznik, Szczytno County, a village in Warmian-Masurian Voivodeship, Poland
- Słonecznik (rock), a standalone prominent rock in the Giant Mountains in central Europe
