= Kulka =

- Village
- Location within Poland
- Coordinates: 53°39′56″N 21°03′25″E
- Country: Poland
- Voivodeship: Warmian-Masurian
- County: Szczytno
- Gmina: Dźwierzuty

Kulka [ˈkulka] (German: Kulk) is a village in the administrative district of Gmina Dźwierzuty, within Szczytno County, Warmian-Masurian Voivodeship, in northern Poland.
