= Rutkowo =

Rutkowo may refer to the following places:

- Rutkowo, Masovian Voivodeship (east-central Poland)
- Rutkowo, Mrągowo County in Warmian-Masurian Voivodeship (north Poland)
- Rutkowo, Szczytno County in Warmian-Masurian Voivodeship (north Poland)
- Rutkowo, West Pomeranian Voivodeship (north-west Poland)
