= Rutki, Warmian-Masurian Voivodeship =

Rutki
- Village
- Location within Poland
- Coordinates: 53°36′N 20°43′E
- Country: Poland
- Voivodeship: Warmian-Masurian
- County: Szczytno
- Gmina: Pasym

Rutki [ˈrutki] (German: Klein Ruttken) is a village in the administrative district of Gmina Pasym, within Szczytno County, Warmian-Masurian Voivodeship, in northern Poland.
