= Gmina Dźwierzuty =

Gmina Dźwierzuty Dźwierzuty Commune
- Gmina
- Flag Coat of arms
- Interactive map of Gmina Dźwierzuty
- Coordinates (Dźwierzuty): 53°43′N 20°57′E
- Country: Poland
- Voivodeship: Warmian-Masurian
- County: Szczytno
- Seat: Dźwierzuty

Area
  - Total: 263.35 km^{2} (101.68 sq mi)

Population (2006)
  - Total: 6,631
  - Density: 25.18/km^{2} (65.21/sq mi)
- Website: http://www.ug-dzwierzuty.pl/

Gmina Dźwierzuty is a rural gmina (administrative district) in Szczytno County, Warmian-Masurian Voivodeship, in northern Poland. Its seat is the village of Dźwierzuty, which lies approximately 18 kilometres (11 mi) north of Szczytno and 31 km (19 mi) east of the regional capital Olsztyn.

The gmina covers an area of 263.35 square kilometres (101.7 sq mi), and as of 2006 its total population is 6,631.

== Neighbouring gminas ==
Gmina Dźwierzuty is bordered by the gminas of Barczewo, Biskupiec, Pasym, Piecki, Purda, Sorkwity, Świętajno and Szczytno.

== Villages ==
The gmina contains the following villages having the status of sołectwo: Dąbrowa, Dźwierzuty, Gisiel, Jabłonka, Jeleniowo, Linowo, Łupowo, Miętkie, Orzyny, Nowe Kiejkuty, Olszewki, Popowa Wola, Rańsk, Rumy, Sąpłaty and Targowo.

Other villages and settlements include: Augustowo, Babięty, Budy, Grądy, Grodziska, Julianowo, Kałęczyn, Kulka, Laurentowo, Małszewko, Mirowo, Mycielin, Przytuły, Rogale, Rów, Rusek Mały, Rutkowo, Stankowo, Szczepankowo, Śledzie, Targowska Wola, Targowska Wólka, Zalesie, Zazdrość and Zimna Woda.
