= Targowska Wólka =

- Village
- Location within Poland
- Coordinates: 53°43′N 21°4′E
- Country: Poland
- Voivodeship: Warmian-Masurian
- County: Szczytno
- Gmina: Dźwierzuty

Targowska Wólka (Polish pronunciation: [tarˈɡɔfska ˈvulka]; German: Waldrode) is a village in the administrative district of Gmina Dźwierzuty, within Szczytno County, Warmian-Masurian Voivodeship, in northern Poland.
