= Słonecznik, Szczytno County =

Słonecznik
- Village
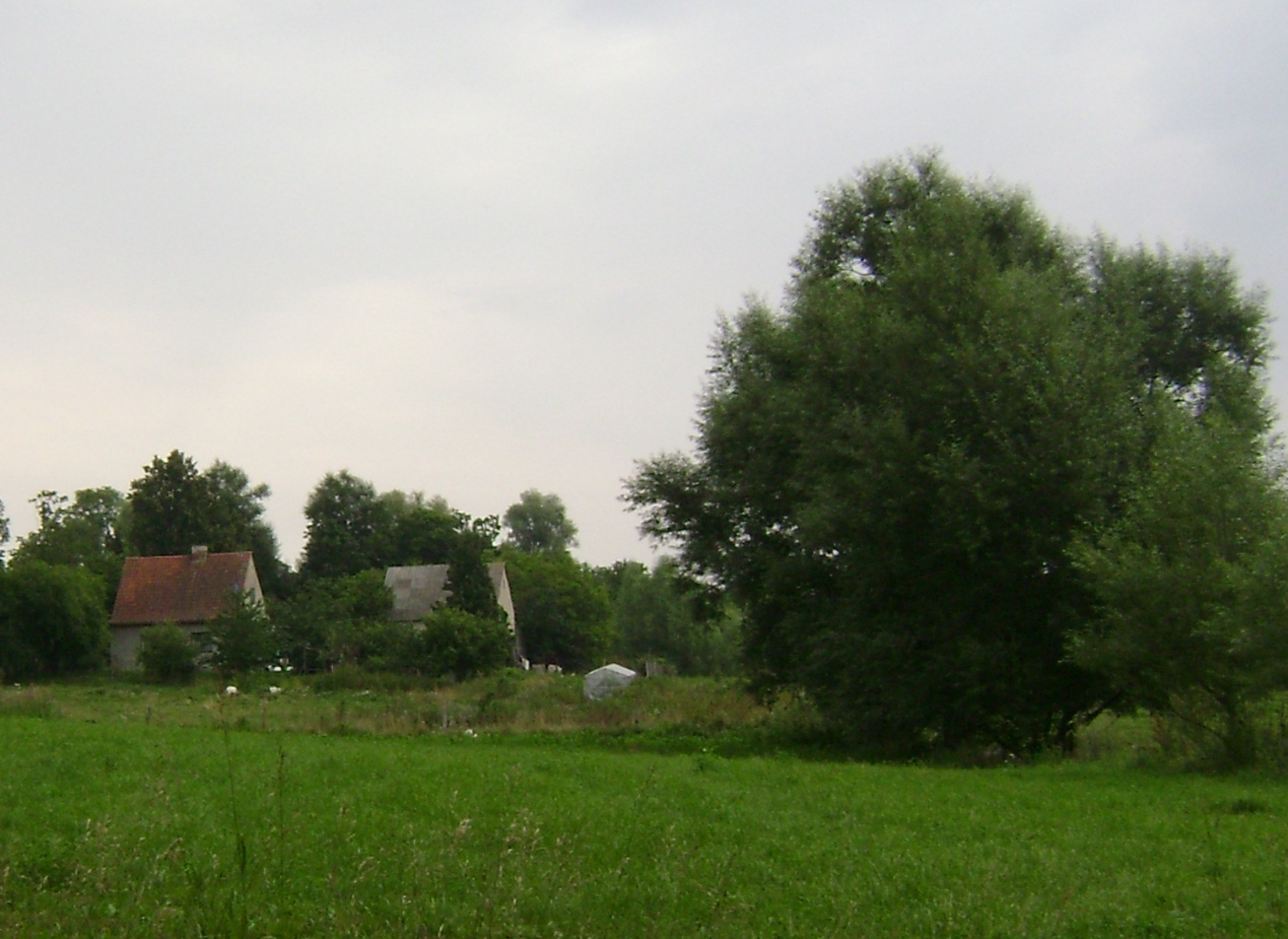

- Location within Poland
- Coordinates: 53°37′46″N 20°47′22″E
- Country: Poland
- Voivodeship: Warmian-Masurian
- County: Szczytno
- Gmina: Pasym
- Population: 160

Słonecznik [swɔˈnɛt͡ʂnik] (German: Sonnenberg) is a village in the administrative district of Gmina Pasym, within Szczytno County, Warmian-Masurian Voivodeship, in northern Poland.

The village has a population of 160.
