= Targowska Wola =

- Village
- Location within Poland
- Coordinates: 53°44′N 21°2′E
- Country: Poland
- Voivodeship: Warmian-Masurian
- County: Szczytno
- Gmina: Dźwierzuty

Targowska Wola [tarˈɡɔfska ˈvɔla] (German: Theerwischwolla) is a village in the administrative district of Gmina Dźwierzuty, within Szczytno County, Warmian-Masurian Voivodeship, in northern Poland.
