= Rutkowo, Szczytno County =

Rutkowo
- Village
- Location within Poland
- Coordinates: 53°45′24″N 21°0′55″E
- Country: Poland
- Voivodeship: Warmian-Masurian
- County: Szczytno
- Gmina: Dźwierzuty
- Population: 130

Rutkowo [rutˈkɔvɔ] (German: Ruttkowen; 1938-45: Ruttkau) is a village in the administrative district of Gmina Dźwierzuty, within Szczytno County, Warmian-Masurian Voivodeship, in northern Poland.

The village has a population of 130.
