= Linowo, Szczytno County =

Linowo
- Village
- Location within Poland
- Coordinates: 53°38′N 20°57′E
- Country: Poland
- Voivodeship: Warmian-Masurian
- County: Szczytno
- Gmina: Dźwierzuty

Linowo ([liˈnɔvɔ]; German: Leynau, 1938–45 Leinau) is a village in the administrative district of Gmina Dźwierzuty, within Szczytno County, Warmian-Masurian Voivodeship, in northern Poland.
