= Gmina Pasym =

Administrative area in Warmian-Masurian Voivodeship, Poland

Gmina Pasym Pasym Commune
- Gmina
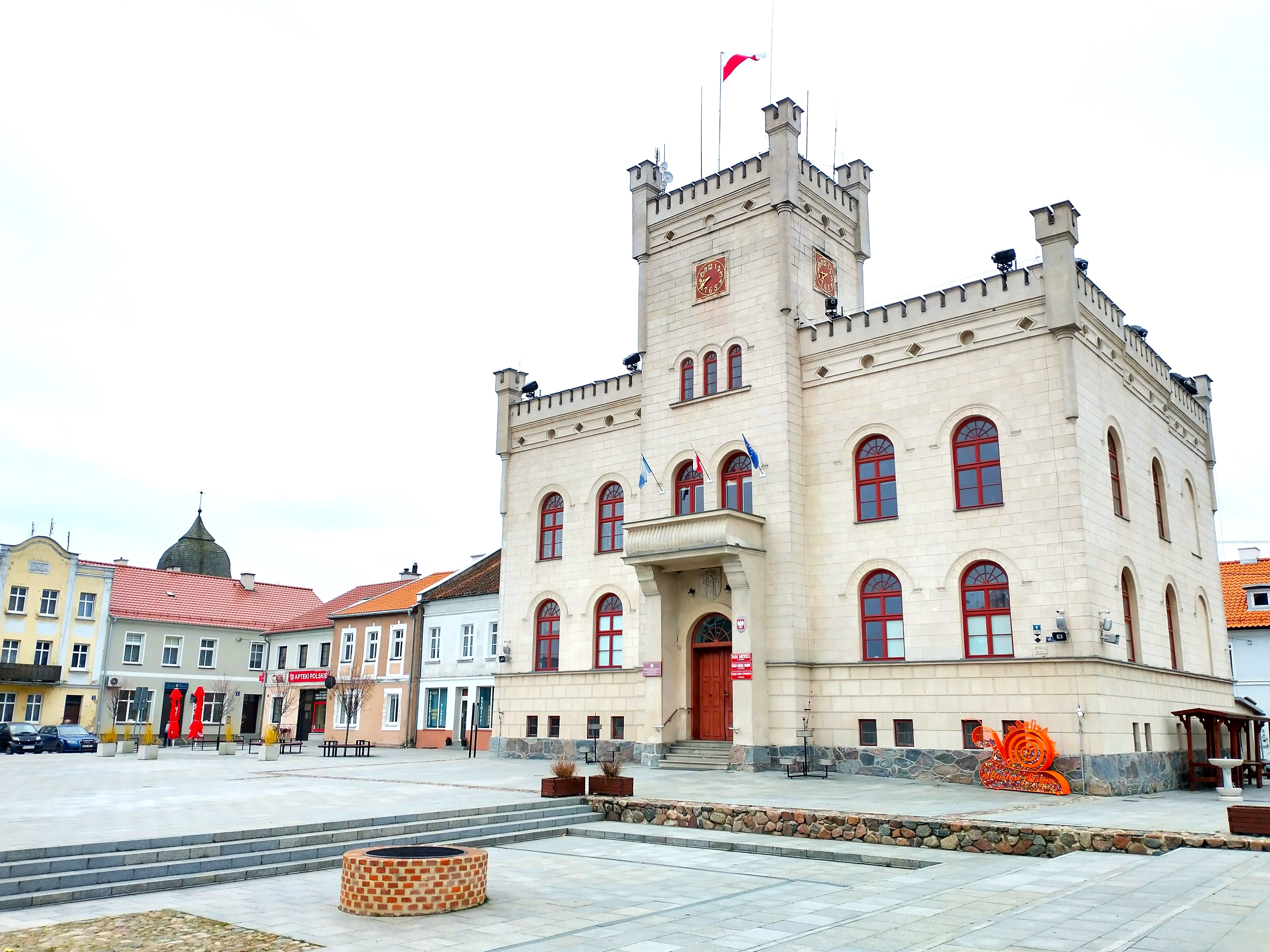
- Town Hall in Pasym, seat of the gmina office

- Coat of arms
- Interactive map of Gmina Pasym
- Coordinates (Pasym): 53°38′52″N 20°47′27″E
- Country: Poland
- Voivodeship: Warmian-Masurian
- County: Szczytno
- Seat: Pasym

Area
  - Total: 149.4 km^{2} (57.7 sq mi)

Population (2006)
  - Total: 5,184
  - Density: 34.70/km^{2} (89.87/sq mi)
  - Urban: 2,550
  - Rural: 2,634
- Time zone: UTC+1 (CET)
  - Summer (DST): UTC+2 (CEST)
- Vehicle registration: NSZ
- Website: http://www.pasym.pl/

Gmina Pasym is an urban-rural gmina (administrative district) in Szczytno County, Warmian-Masurian Voivodeship, in northern Poland. Its seat is the town of Pasym, which lies approximately 16 kilometres (10 mi) north-west of Szczytno and 25 km (16 mi) south-east of the regional capital Olsztyn.

The gmina covers an area of 149.4 square kilometres (57.7 sq mi), and as of 2006 its total population is 5,184 (out of which the population of Pasym amounts to 2,550, and the population of the rural part of the gmina is 2,634).

== Villages ==
Apart from the town of Pasym, Gmina Pasym contains the villages and settlements of Dybowo, Dźwiersztyny, Elganowo, Grom, Grzegrzółki, Jurgi, Krzywonoga, Leleszki, Łysa Góra, Michałki, Miłuki, Narajty, Otole, Pasym-Kolonie, Rudziska Pasymskie, Rusek Wielki, Rutki, Siedliska, Słonecznik, Tylkówek and Tylkowo.

== Neighbouring gminas ==
Gmina Pasym is bordered by the gminas of Dźwierzuty, Jedwabno, Purda and Szczytno.
