= Rusek Wielki =

- Village
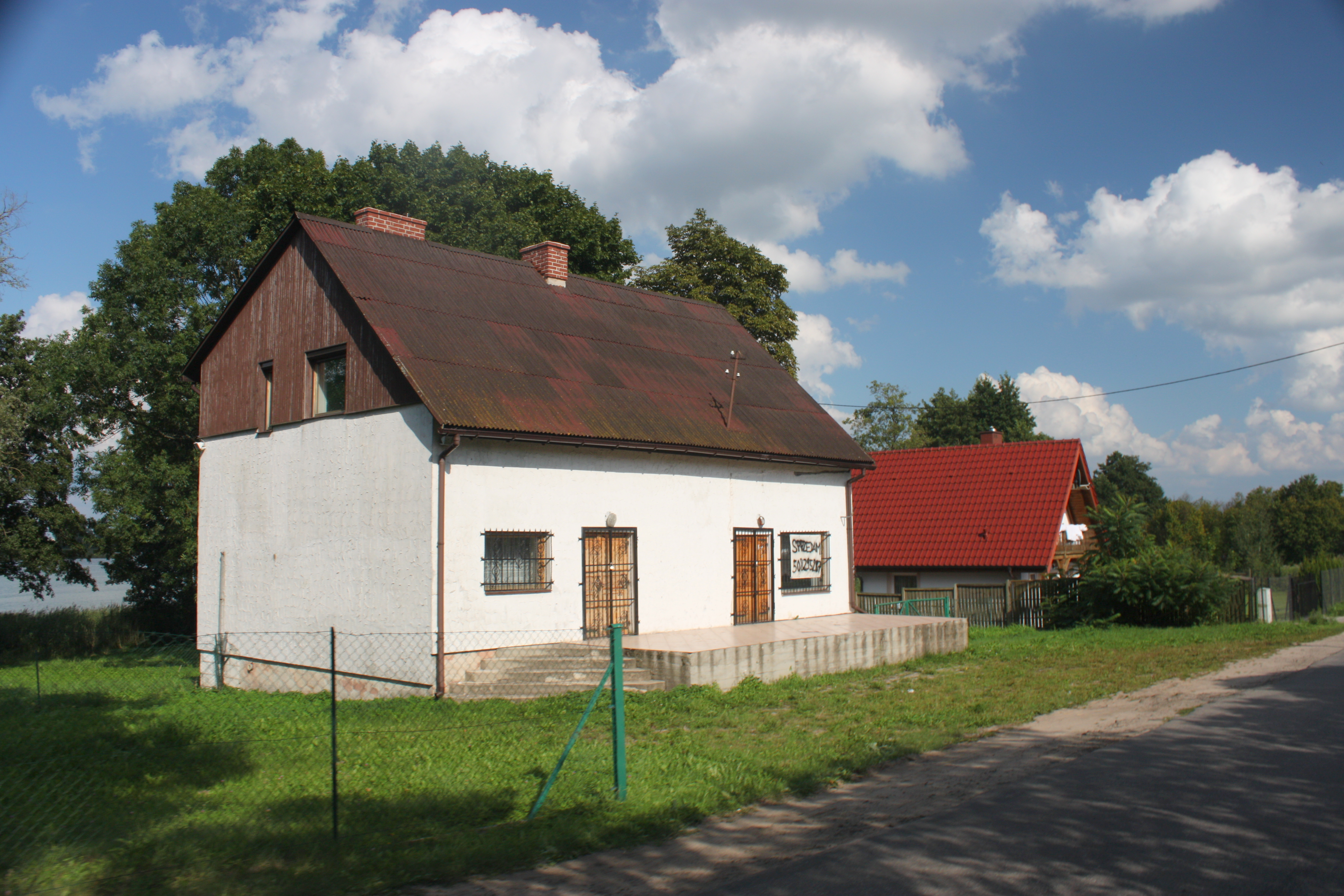

- Location within Poland
- Coordinates: 53°43′N 20°51′E
- Country: Poland
- Voivodeship: Warmian-Masurian
- County: Szczytno
- Gmina: Pasym

Rusek Wielki (Polish pronunciation: [ˈrusɛk ˈfjɛlkʲi]; German: Groß Rauschken) is a village in the administrative district of Gmina Pasym, within Szczytno County, Warmian-Masurian Voivodeship, in northern Poland.
