= Rutki =

Rutki may refer to the following places:

- Rutki, Masovian Voivodeship (east-central Poland)
- Rutki, Opole Voivodeship (south-west Poland)
- Rutki, Pomeranian Voivodeship (north Poland)
- Rutki, Warmian-Masurian Voivodeship (north Poland)
