= Rusek Mały =

- Village
- Location within Poland
- Coordinates: 53°43′N 20°52′E
- Country: Poland
- Voivodeship: Warmian-Masurian
- County: Szczytno
- Gmina: Dźwierzuty
- Founded: 1414
- Area code: (+48) 89
- Vehicle registration: NSZ

Rusek Mały [ˈrusɛk ˈmawɨ] (German: Klein Rauschken) is a village in the administrative district of Gmina Dźwierzuty, within Szczytno County, Warmian-Masurian Voivodeship, in northern Poland.
