= Christoph Hartknoch =

Prussian historian (1644–1687)

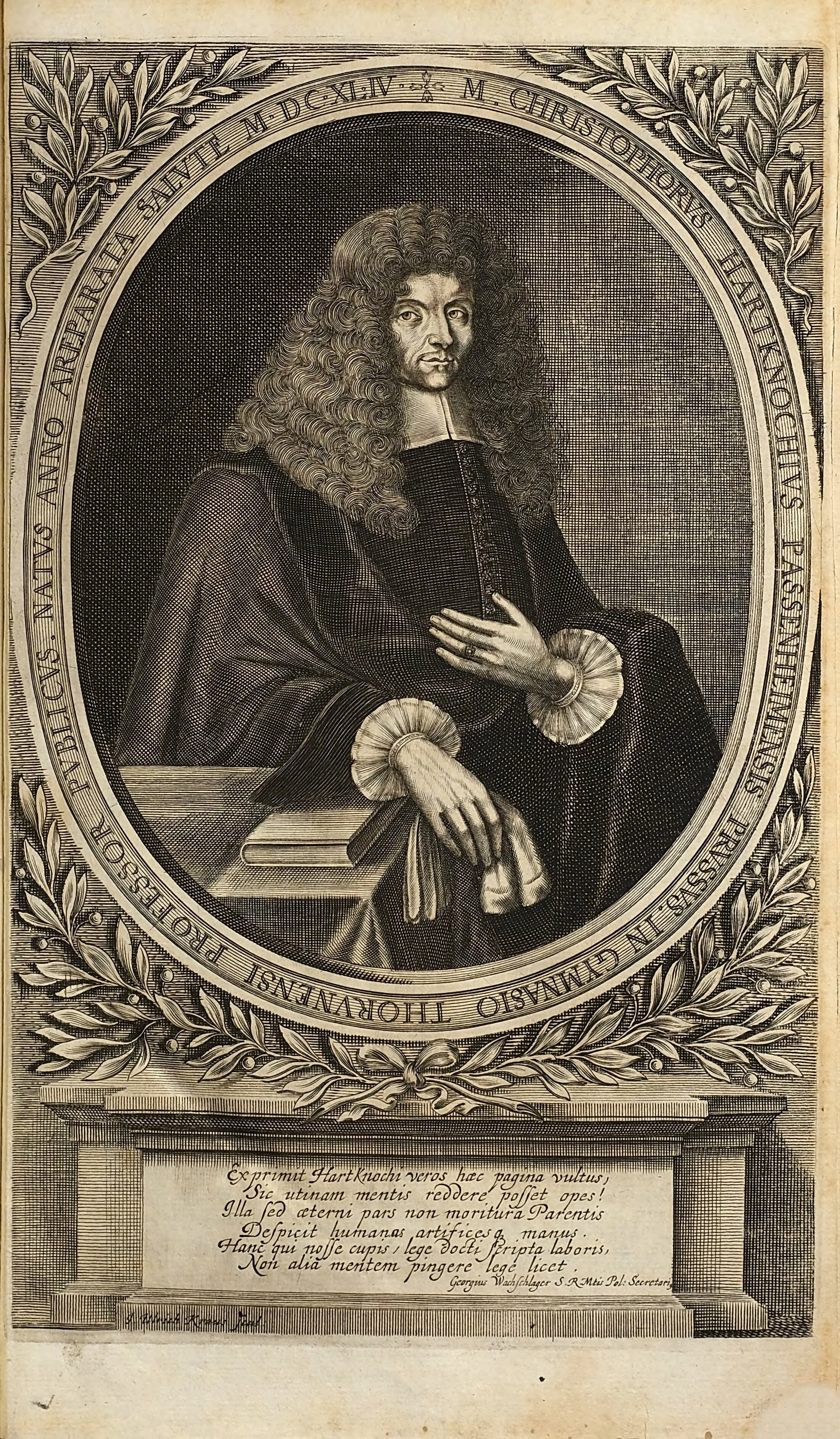
Christoph Hartknoch

Christoph Hartknoch (1644–1687) was a Prussian historian and educator.

== Biography ==
Hartknoch was born in Jablonken (Polish: Jabłonka) near Ortelsburg (Szczytno) in the Duchy of Prussia. In 1650 the family moved to Passenheim (Pasym) and there witnessed the brutality and horrors of the Tatar attacks, fighting for the Kingdom of Poland, in southern Prussia. His life was saved by his teacher, who shoved him out the window. Numerous villages in the region were destroyed, but Hartknoch made it to the ducal capital of Königsberg.

In Königsberg Hartknoch started studying theology at a Protestant institute. Soon after his parents died and he had to take on jobs. He became a private teacher in Kaunas and then a rector in the Protestant school in Vilnius. He soon returned to Königsberg where books and records interested him in history.

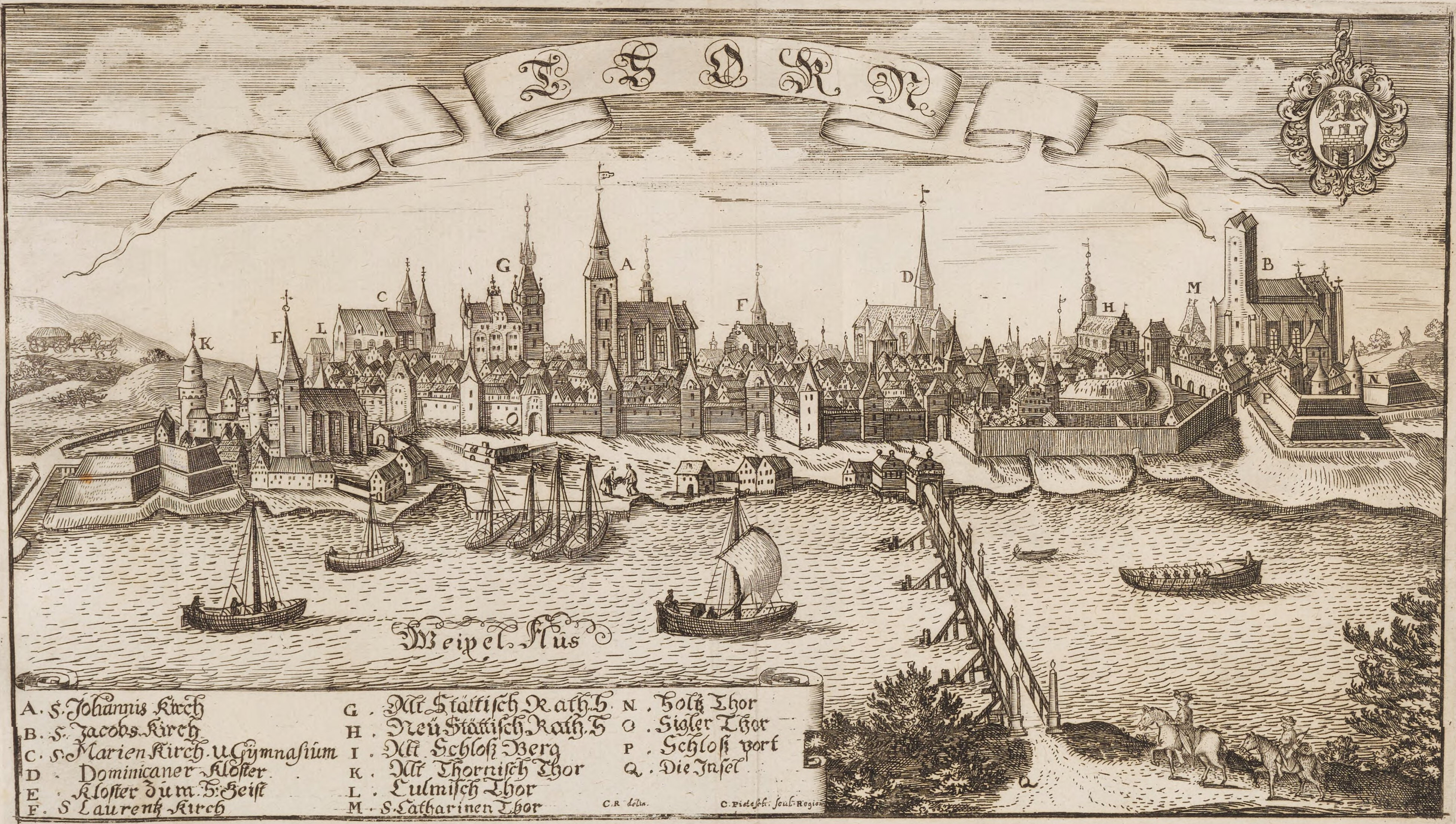
Hartknoch features his last residence, the city of Thorn (Toruń), in his book Old and New Prussia

In 1679 Hartknoch published a book about Prussian history, Old and New Prussia, first in Latin and then in German, as well as a history of the church in Prussia. The works are accompanied by descriptions and illustrations of people, history, and culture, as well as copper etching illustrations of towns. He received ethnographical information from the priest Matthäus Prätorius.

Hartknoch's work in the Polish–Lithuanian Commonwealth, Kaunas, and Vilnius awoke his interest in their history. He wrote a comprehensive work on the Commonwealth spanning 300 years, the first of its kind.

In 1677 the city of Thorn (Toruń) invited Hartknoch to become director at its gymnasium, where he worked for ten years. Wearied by poverty, Hartknoch died and was buried there in 1687 at the age of 43.

Hartknoch's extensive scientific body of works contributed greatly to knowledge of Prussia, Pomerania, Samogitia, Courland, and Poland.

== Nicolaus Copernicus portrait ==
In his book covering the history of Prussia, Hartknoch features an illustration of Nicolaus Copernicus. Hartknoch wrote About the cities and castles. The famous mathematician Nicolaus Copernicus later in his life, while director at the Thorner Gymnasium.

== Works ==
- Respublica Polonica duobus libris illustrata, Frankfurt, Leipzig, 1678
- Selectae dissertationes historicae de variis rebus Prussicis, 1679
- Hartknoch, Christoph (1684), Alt- und Neues Preussen oder Preussischer Historien zwey Theile (in German), Frankfurt: Martin Hallervorden, OCLC 632739674, Wikidata Q140529462
- Preussische Kirchen-Historia [History of the Prussian Church], Frankfurt, Danzig, 1686

== Sources ==
- Janczewski, Z. A. (2002). "Bekannte Persönlichkeiten aus unserer Heimat: Christoph Hartknoch (1644-1687)". Mitteilungsblatt der deutschen Minderheit im Bezirk Ermland-Masuren (in German). Archived from the original on 3 March 2006.
- Mosheim, Johann Lorenz; Murdock, James (1871). Institutes of Ecclesiastical History. New York: R. Carter & Bros. OCLC 1042977652. OL 7082275M.
