= Dźwierzuty =

- Village
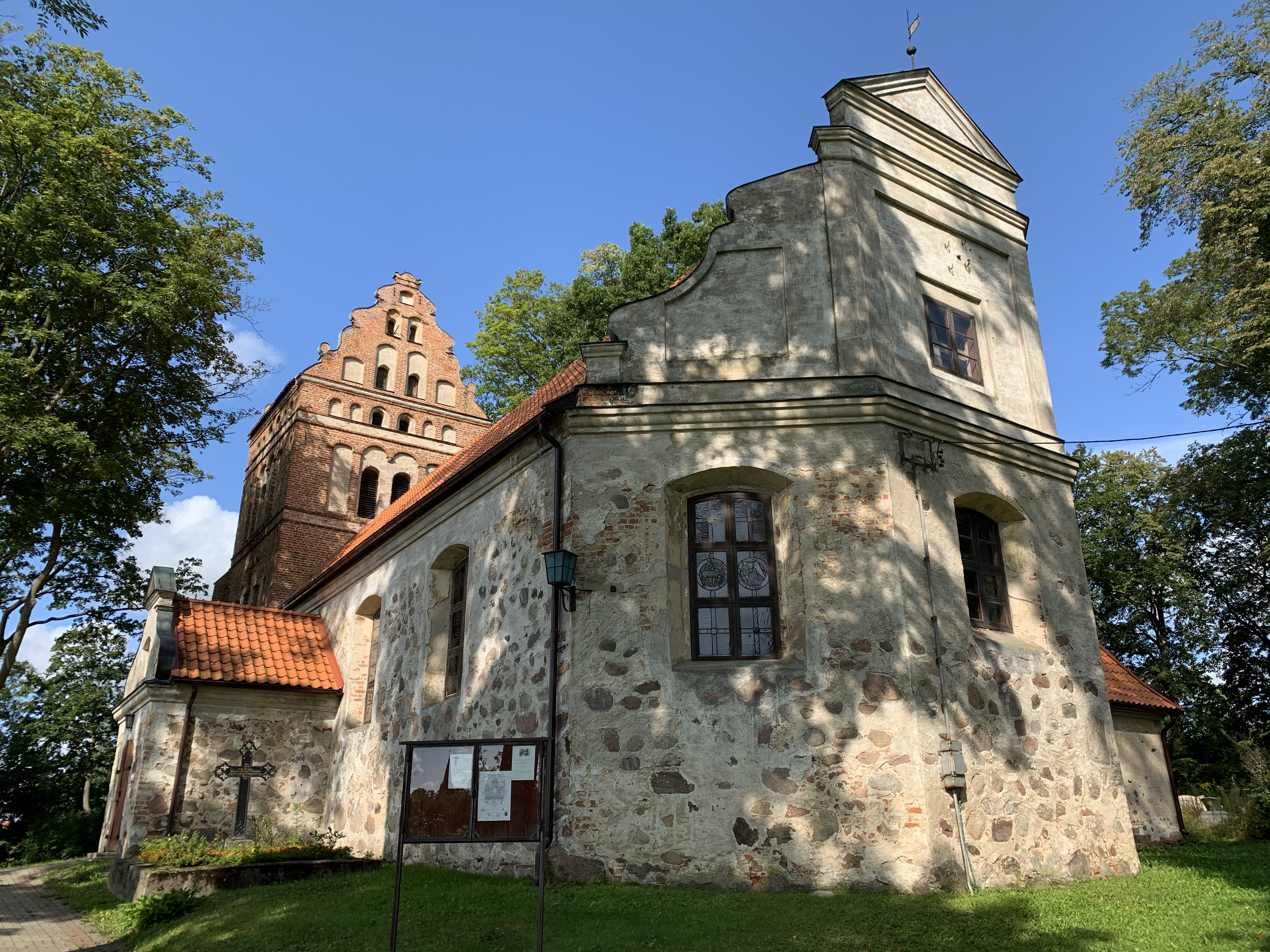
- Lutheran church

- Location within Poland
- Coordinates: 53°43′N 20°57′E
- Country: Poland
- Voivodeship: Warmian-Masurian
- County: Szczytno
- Gmina: Dźwierzuty

Population
  - Total: 1,380

Dźwierzuty [d͡ʑvjɛˈʐutɨ] (German: Mensguth) is a village in Szczytno County, Warmian-Masurian Voivodeship, in northern Poland. It is the seat of the gmina (administrative district) called Gmina Dźwierzuty.

In 2006 the village had a population of 1,380.
