= Pasym =

Town in Warmian-Masurian Voivodeship, Poland

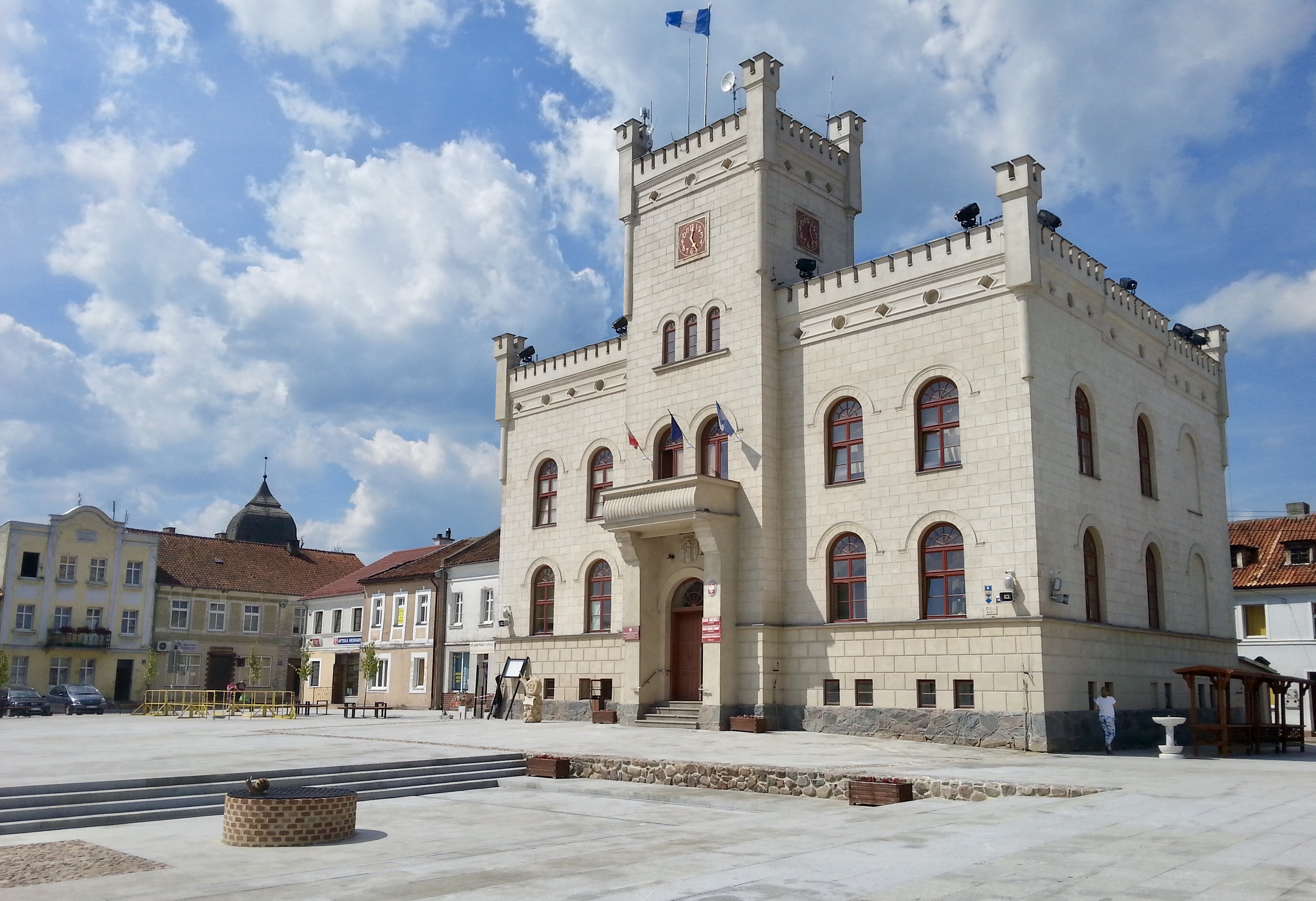
- Town Hall

- Flag Coat of arms

- Location within Poland
- Coordinates: 53°38′52″N 20°47′27″E
- Country: Poland
- Voivodeship: Warmian-Masurian
- County: Szczytno
- Gmina: Pasym
- Town rights: 1386

Area
  - Total: 15.18 km^{2} (5.86 sq mi)

Population (2016)
  - Total: 2,556
  - Density: 168.4/km^{2} (436.1/sq mi)
- Time zone: UTC+1 (CET)
  - Summer (DST): UTC+2 (CEST)
- Postal code: 12-130
- Vehicle registration: NSZ

Pasym ([ˈpasɨm]; German: Passenheim) is a town in Szczytno County, Warmian-Masurian Voivodeship, in northern Poland, with a total population (as of 30 June 2016) of 2,556. It is located in Masuria.

== History ==
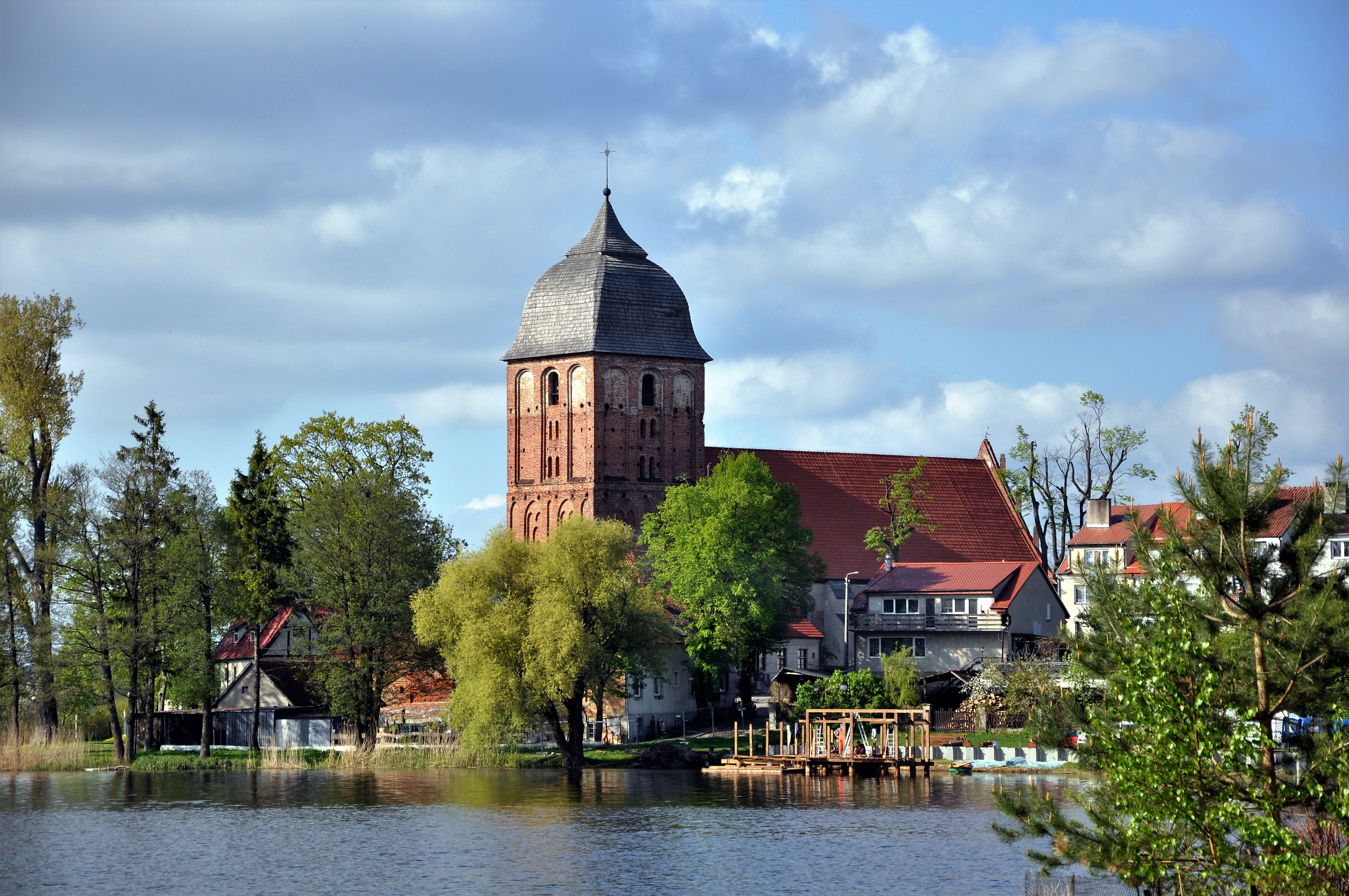
Gothic Lutheran church

A small settlement named Heinrichswalde was first mentioned in 1381. In 1386 this settlement was renamed Passenheim after the Teutonic Knight Heinrich Walpot von Passenheim from modern Bassenheim near Koblenz. In Polish it was known as Pasym, Pasymek and Pasyń.

In 1441 the town joined the Prussian Confederation, at which request in 1454 King Casimir IV Jagiellon signed the act of incorporation of the region to the Kingdom of Poland, recognized the Polish king as rightful ruler and remained within Poland throughout the entire Thirteen Years’ War. After the peace treaty signed in Toruń in 1466, the town became a part of Poland as a fief held by the State of the Teutonic Order until 1525, and by the secular Duchy of Prussia afterwards, remaining a Polish fief until 1657.

The town was destroyed by the Tatar raids in 1656, which has been described by Christoph Hartknoch (1644–1687). In the late 17th century Poles formed the majority of its population.

In 1701 the town became part of the Kingdom of Prussia and subsequently, in 1871, it became part of Germany. In 1773 it was included in the newly established province of East Prussia. During the Napoleonic Wars, French troops stayed in the town in 1807 and 1812. In 1883, Poles formed the majority of the local Lutheran parish (majority of the town's population was Lutheran), with 5,095 people in comparison to 1,015 Germans.

In the East Prussian plebiscite of 1920 1,459 inhabitants voted to remain in Germany, 40 to join reborn Poland. After World War II the region became part of Poland by the Potsdam Agreement. Most Germans fled or were expelled. The remaining Polish population was joined by Polish settlers, many of whom were expelled from the former eastern Polish territories annexed by the Soviet Union. In 1947, an orphanage for war orphans was established in Pasym, which today continues to operate as an ordinary orphanage.

== Transport ==
The Polish National road 53 runs through the town. There is also a railway station serving a single-track line which splits around the central platform.

== Sports ==
The local football club is Błękitni Pasym. It competes in the lower leagues.

== Notable residents ==
- Johann Wilhelm Ebel (1784–1861), Lutheran clergyman and teacher
- Marie-Luise Gothein (1863–1931), scholar, gardener and author
- Christoph Hartknoch (1644-1687), teacher, historian, author
- Friedrich-Wilhelm Morzik (1891-1985), Luftwaffe general

== International relations ==
=== Twin towns — sister cities ===
Pasym is twinned with:

- Bassenheim, Germany

== Gallery ==
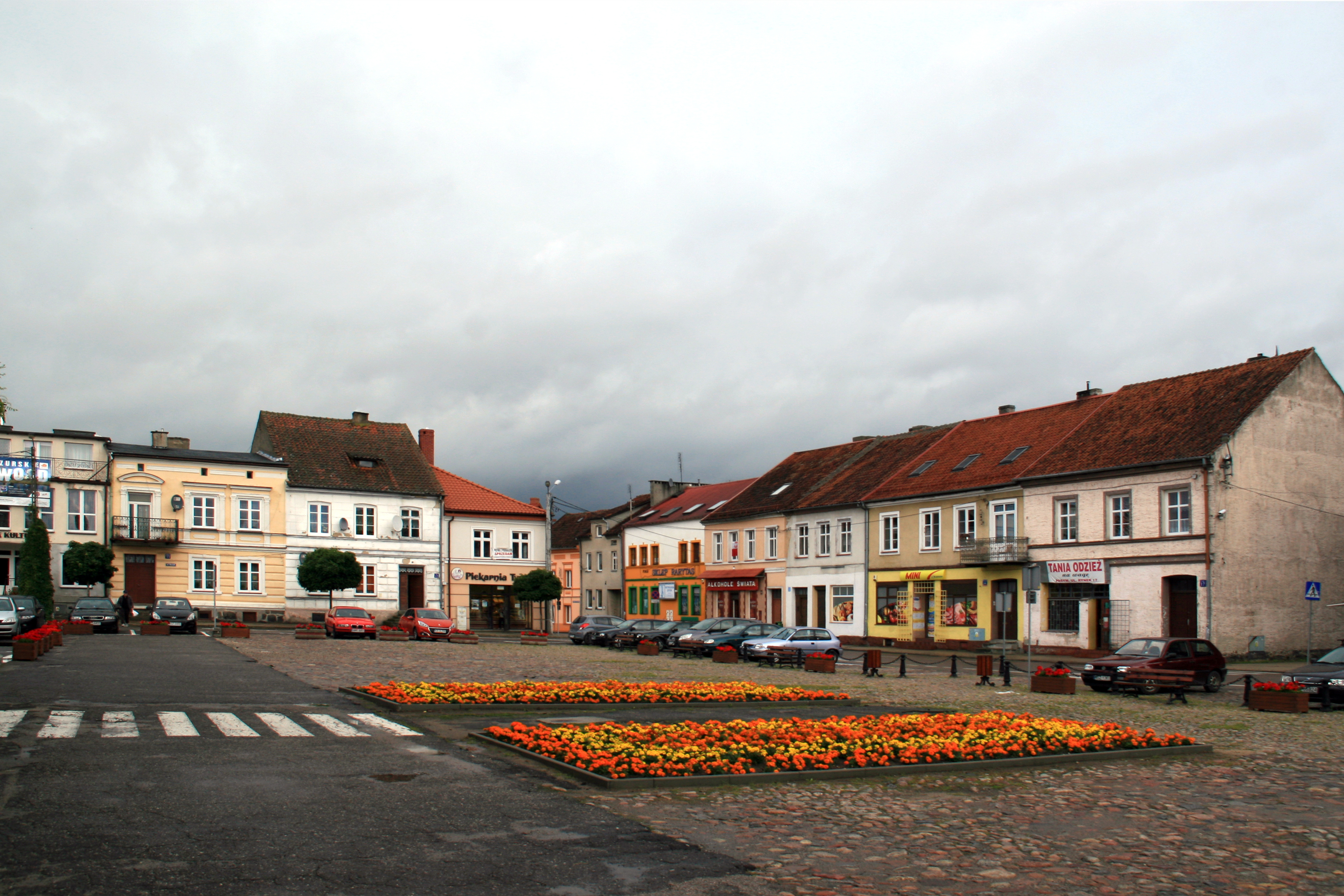
Rynek (Market Square) filled with historic townhouses

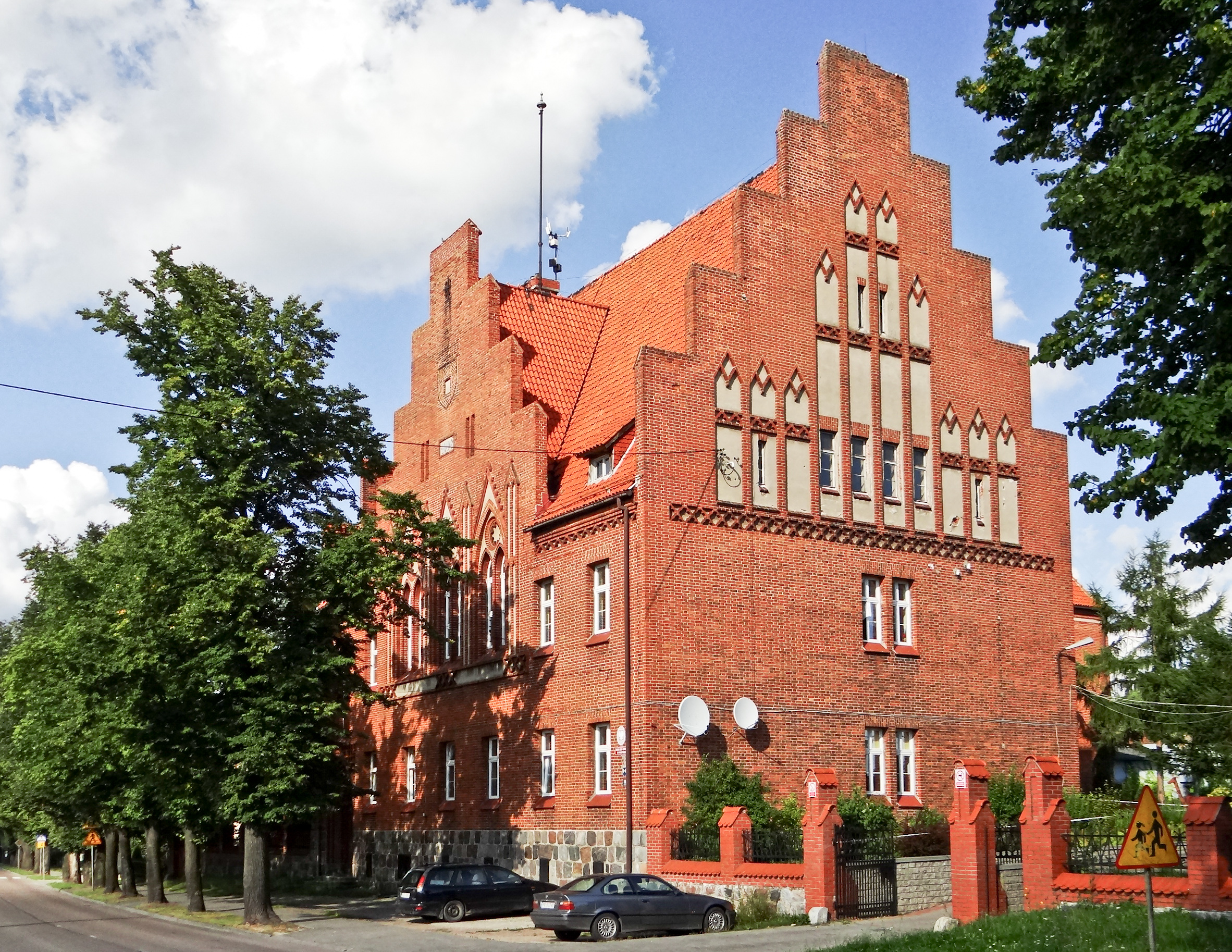
Orphanage

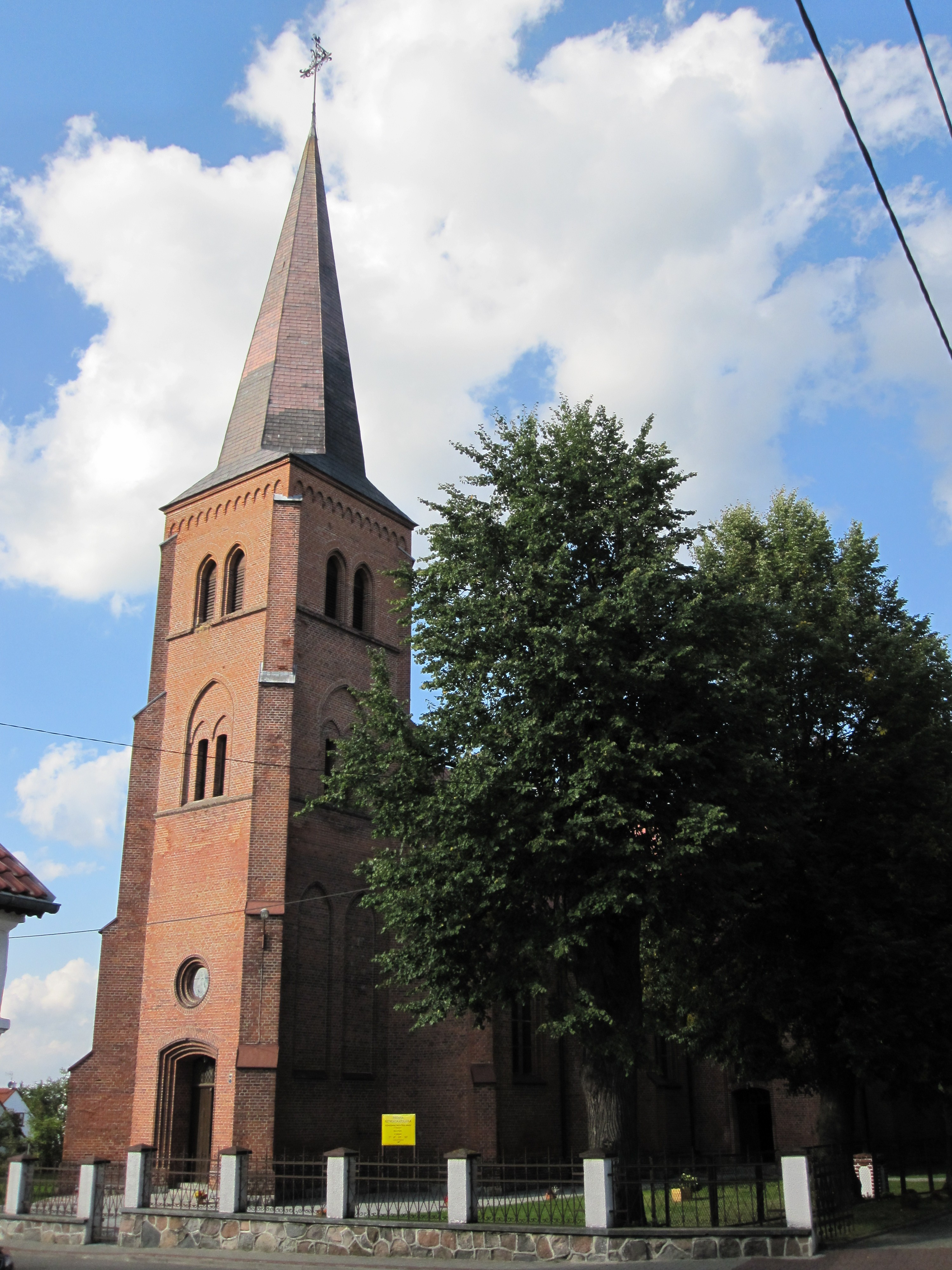
Catholic Sacred Heart church

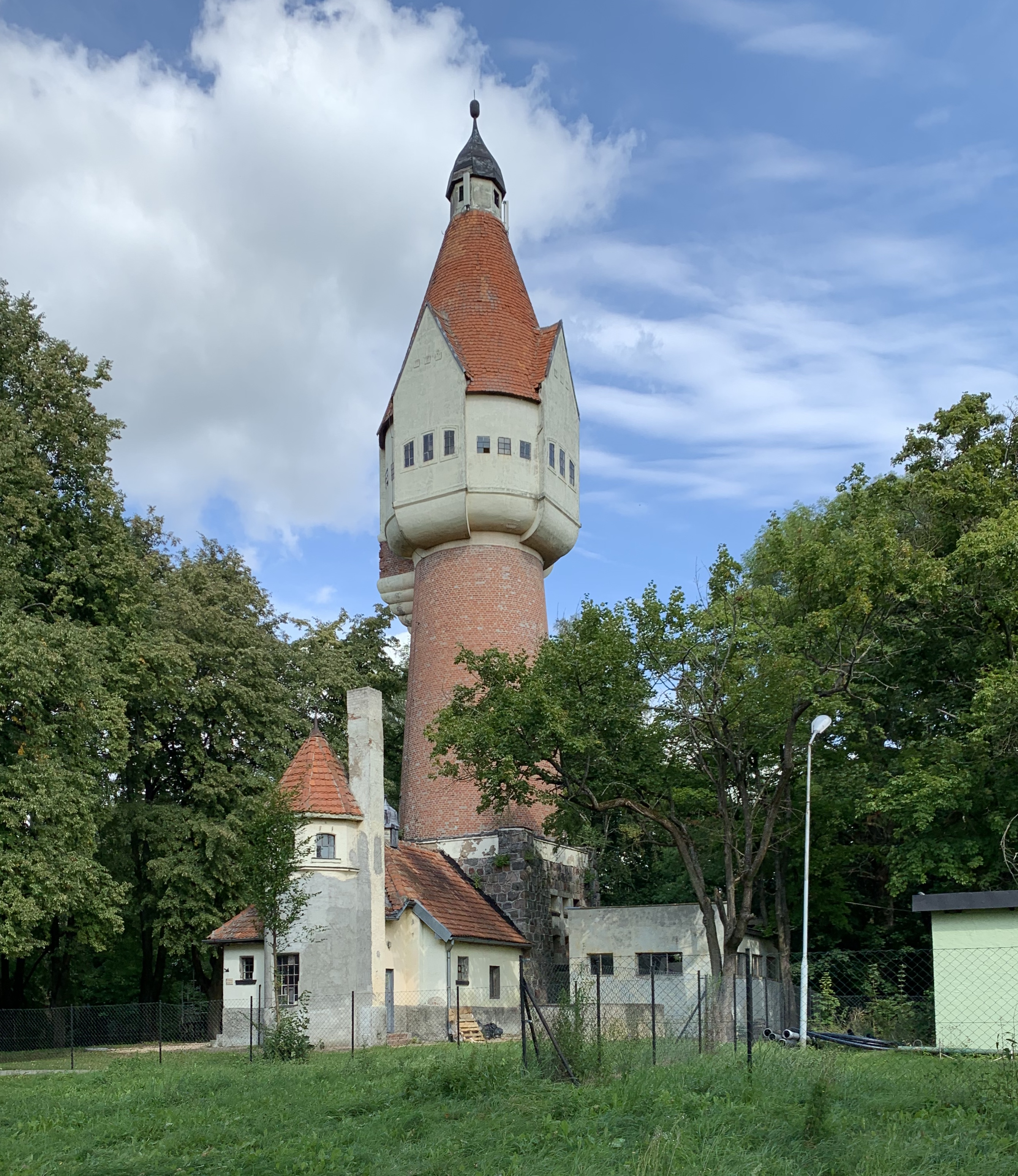
Water tower
