= Rusek, Pomeranian Voivodeship =

Village in Pomeranian Voivodeship, Poland

Rusek
- Village
- Location within Poland
- Coordinates: 53°52′17″N 18°34′39″E
- Country: Poland
- Voivodeship: Pomeranian
- County: Starogard
- Gmina: Bobowo

Population
  - Total: 72
- Time zone: UTC+1 (CET)
  - Summer (DST): UTC+2 (CEST)
- Vehicle registration: GST

Rusek [ˈrusɛk] is a village in the administrative district of Gmina Bobowo, within Starogard County, Pomeranian Voivodeship, in northern Poland. It is located in the ethnocultural region of Kociewie in the historic region of Pomerania.
