= Wolfgang Victor Ruttkowski =

Wolfgang Victor Ruttkowski is a scholar of literature and culture. He has written four works of comparative literature and psychology of art, now considered standards of their genre. Born in 1935 in Silesia (now Poland), he began his studies in 1961 at the University of Vienna studying theatre arts (he also attended the directors class of the Burgtheater under Krauss) and at the University of Göttingen, mainly German and comparative literature under Wolfgang Kayser. After the latter's unexpected death, he received a DAAD-scholarship at McGill university in Montreal/Canada (1963–65). He obtained his PhD on the subject of cabaret ballads in Germany (Das Literarische Chanson in Deutschland) after which he was invited by Göttingen University for an oral examination, after which he also received the German Dr.Phil. The idea of this topic, formerly never dealt with in a scholarly fashion, came from his nightly performances in cabarets and nightclubs, where he sang German and French cabaret songs and American jazz standards.

His dissertation was published by Francke in Bern and immediately made his name in the scholarly world. He accepted a guest professorship at Tokyo University (1972–74). There he found time to pursue his interest in "audience-related" literature, of which the cabaret song is the most obvious example. But he also studied all types of artists, from the first Greek authors to contemporary international psychological literature, combining this interest with psychology of stratification of personalities. This led to the publication of his second and third works: Literary Genres (Die Literarischen Gattungen, Francke, 1968) and Types and Strata (Typen und Schichten, Francke, 1978). At this time (1972–74) he was teaching at New York University.

Following engagements at the University of Southern California (Los Angeles, 1965 – 68), Temple University in Philadelphia (where he also served as Chair of the German Department, 1974–83) and at Kyoto Sangyo University (1983–2003), he made contact with many internationally known colleagues. With six colleagues he published a 7-language (German-English-French-Italian-Spanish-Dutch-Russian) literary dictionary (Nomenclator Literarius, Francke, 1980). It contains 2,604 groups of terms and an extensive index, with the Russian terms also in Cyrillic script. It sold out almost immediately, mainly to libraries and comparatists. All of these books (and several others, in total 44 books and booklets) were re-published by Igel Verlag (Hamburg) and Grin Verlag (Munich). Thus, Ruttkowski is most likely the most published author in the fields of Poetics of Literary Genres, Psychology of Literature and Literary Terminology.

== Publications ==
Ruttkowski published 42 books and 64 articles including:

- Das literarische Chanson in Deutschland. Francke 1966; Igel Verlag 2013.
- Die literarischen Gattungen. Reflexionen über eine modifizierte Fundamentalpoetik. Francke 1968; Igel Verlag 2014.

== Literature ==
- Wilfried Kürschner: Linguisten Handbuch, Contemporary Authors, Band 15, Dictionnaire international des termes littéraires, sous la dir. de Jean-Marie Grassin et Joseph Fahey, Wiley Online Library, AbeBooks,
- Marquis: Who`s Who in the World; Nihon Shinshiroku: Who`s Who in Japan
