= Szczytno County =

Szczytno County Powiat szczycieński
- County
- Flag Coat of arms

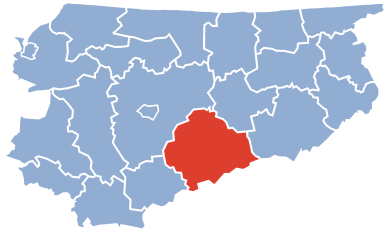
- Location within the voivodeship

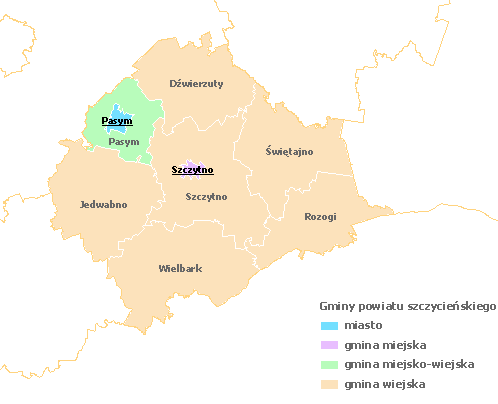
- Division into gminas
- Coordinates (Szczytno): 53°33′46″N 20°59′7″E
- Country: Poland
- Voivodeship: Warmian-Masurian
- Seat: Szczytno
- Gminas: Total 8 (incl. 1 urban): Szczytno; Gmina Dźwierzuty; Gmina Jedwabno; Gmina Pasym; Gmina Rozogi; Gmina Świętajno; Gmina Szczytno; Gmina Wielbark

Area
  - Total: 1,933.1 km^{2} (746.4 sq mi)

Population (2006)
  - Total: 69,289
  - Density: 35.843/km^{2} (92.834/sq mi)
  - Urban: 28,230
  - Rural: 41,059
- Car plates: NSZ
- Website: www.powiat.szczytno.pl

Szczytno County (Polish: powiat szczycieński) is a unit of territorial administration and local government (powiat) in Warmian-Masurian Voivodeship, northern Poland. It came into being on January 1, 1999, as a result of the Polish local government reforms passed in 1998. Its administrative seat and largest town is Szczytno, which lies 45 kilometres (28 mi) south-east of the regional capital Olsztyn. The only other town in the county is Pasym, lying 18 km (11 mi) north-west of Szczytno.

The county covers an area of 1,933.1 square kilometres (746.4 sq mi). As of 2006 its total population is 69,289, out of which the population of Szczytno is 25,680, that of Pasym is 2,550, and the rural population is 41,059.

== Neighbouring counties ==
Szczytno County is bordered by Mrągowo County to the north, Pisz County to the east, Ostrołęka County to the south-east, Przasnysz County to the south, Nidzica County to the west and Olsztyn County to the north-west.

== Administrative divisions ==
The county is subdivided into eight gminas (one urban, one urban-rural and six rural). These are listed in the following table, in descending order of population.

Gmina	Type	Area (km^{2})	Population (2006)	Seat
Szczytno	urban	10.0	25,680	
Gmina Szczytno	rural	347.3	10,454	Szczytno *
Gmina Dźwierzuty	rural	263.4	6,631	Dźwierzuty
Gmina Wielbark	urban-rural	347.9	6,257	Wielbark
Gmina Świętajno	rural	279.8	5,879	Świętajno
Gmina Rozogi	rural	224.0	5,643	Rozogi
Gmina Pasym	urban-rural	149.4	5,184	Pasym
Gmina Jedwabno	rural	311.5	3,561	Jedwabno
* seat not part of the gmina

== Historical population ==
In 1825 Szczytno County (Kreis Ortelsburg) had 38028 inhabitants, including by mother tongue: 34928 (~92%) Polish and 3100 (~8%) German.
