= Masuria =

Region in northeastern Poland

Coordinates: 53.86711°N 20.70279°E

Masuria Mazurÿ
- Ethnographic and geographic region
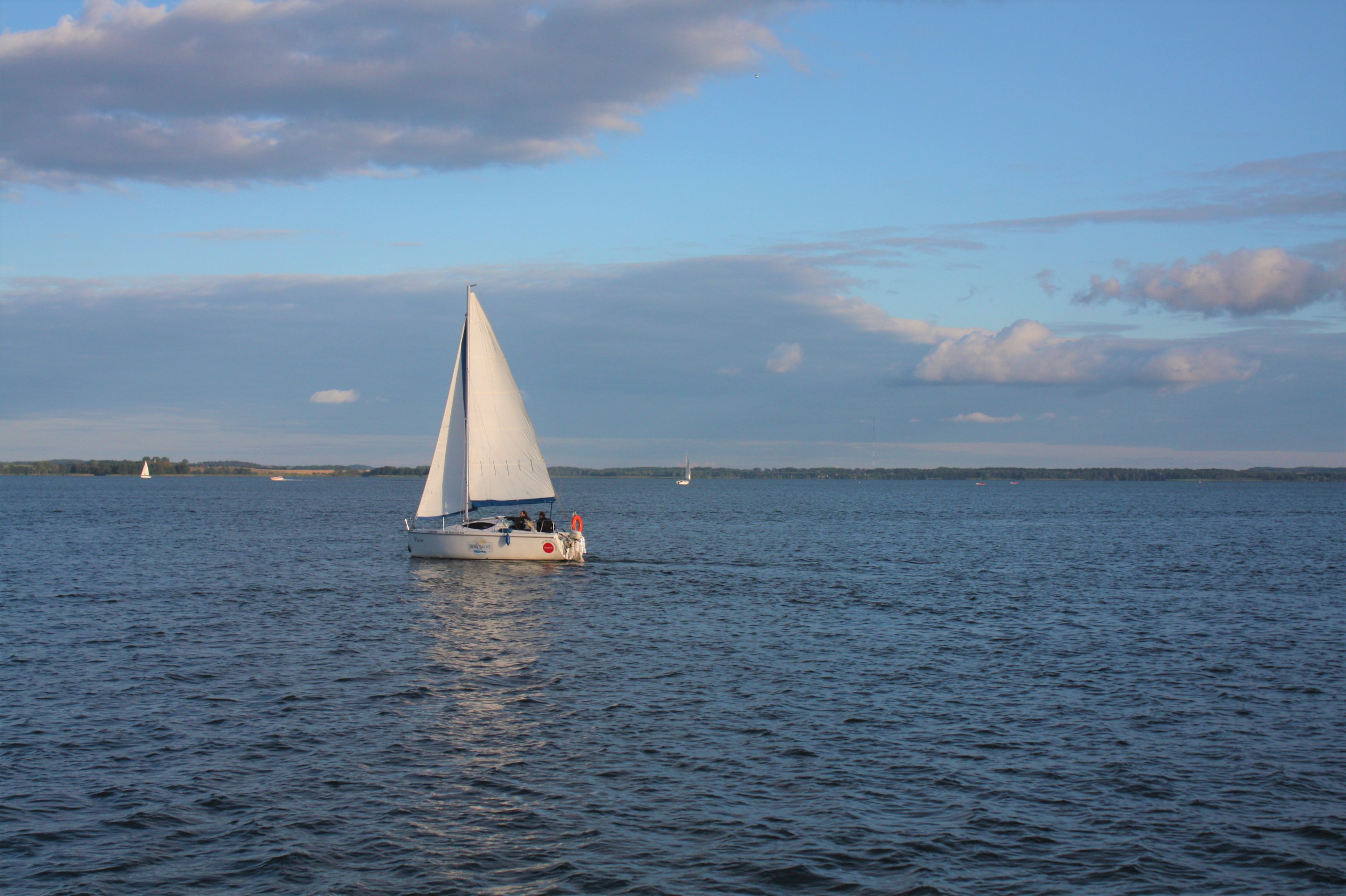
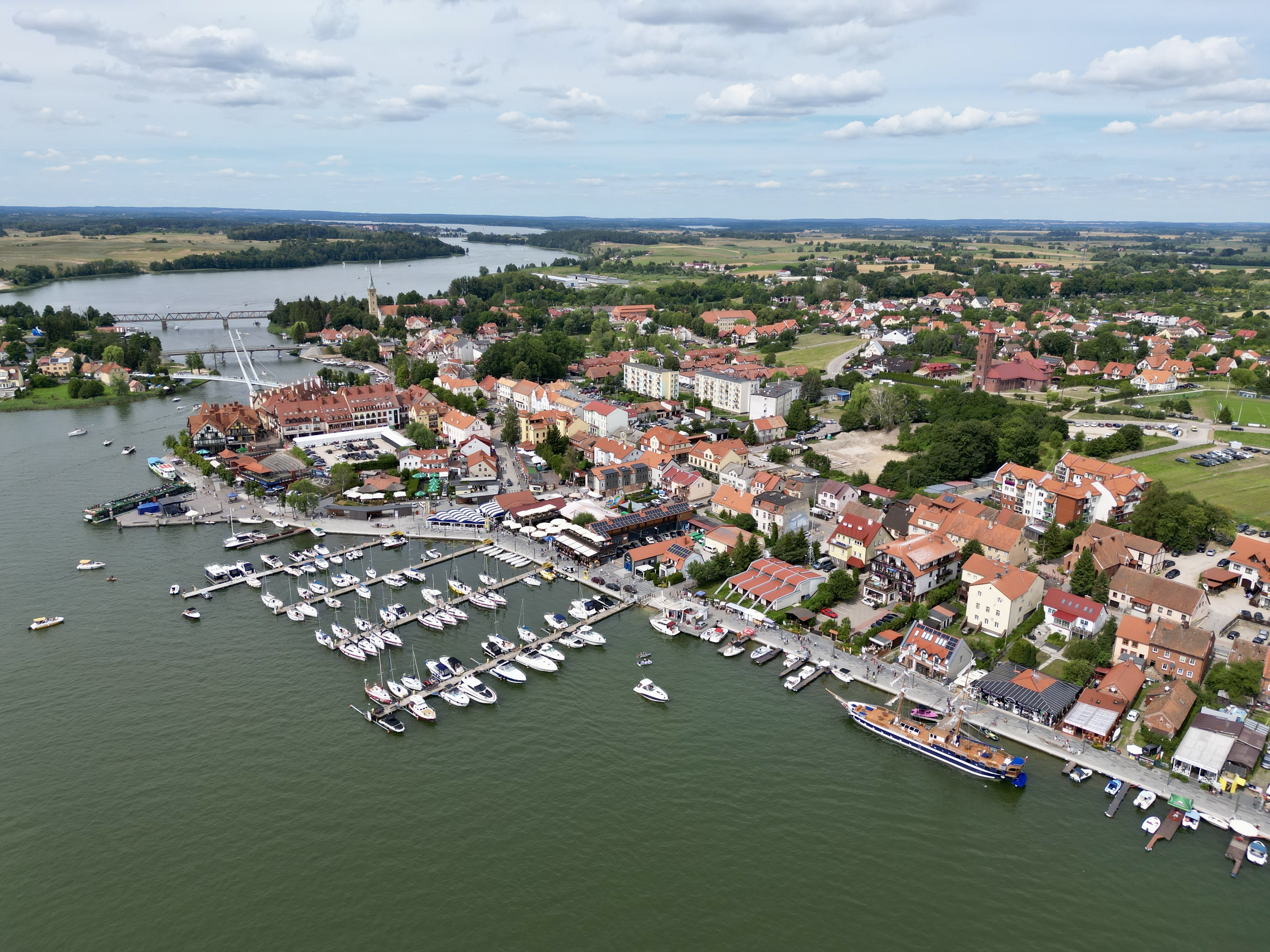
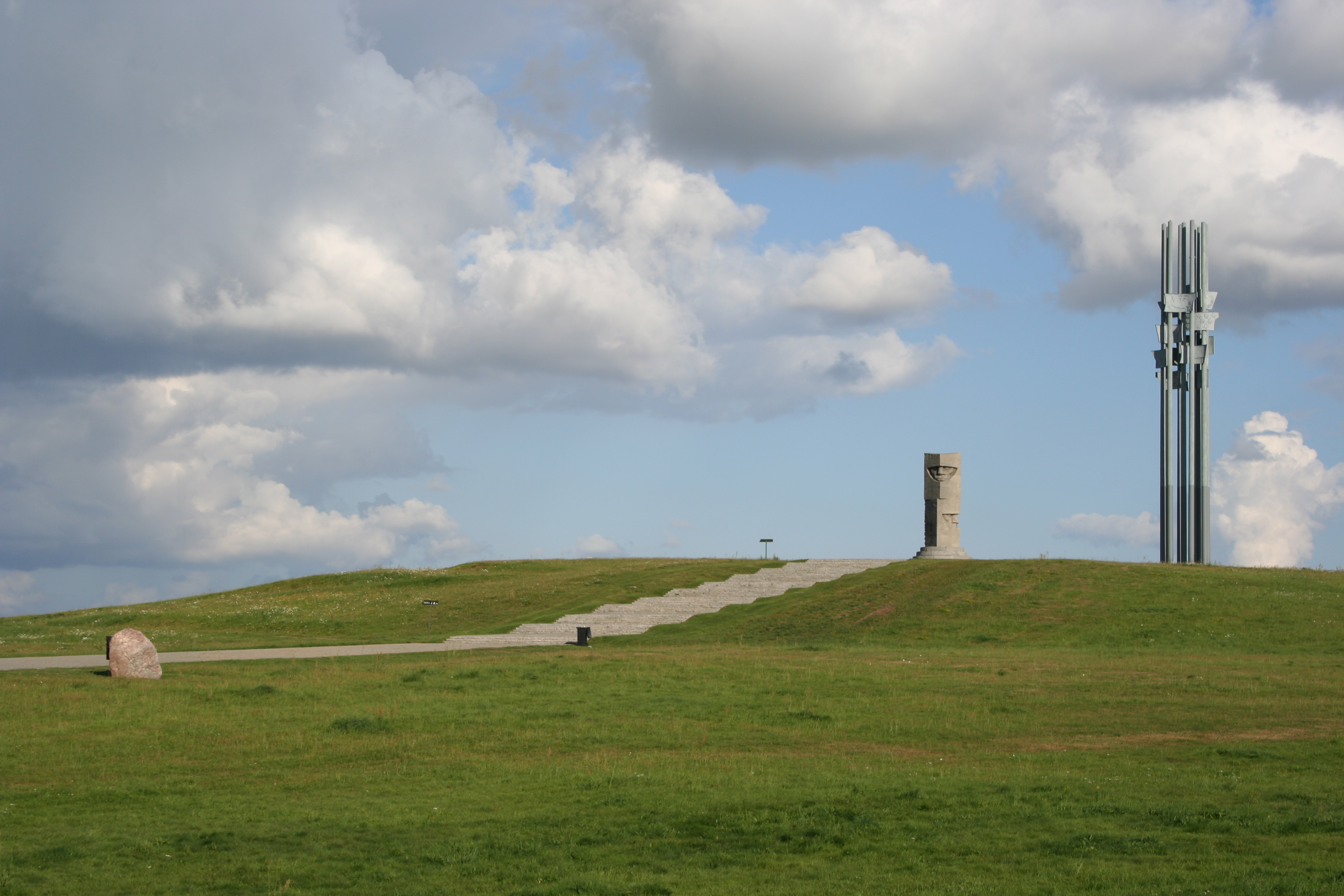
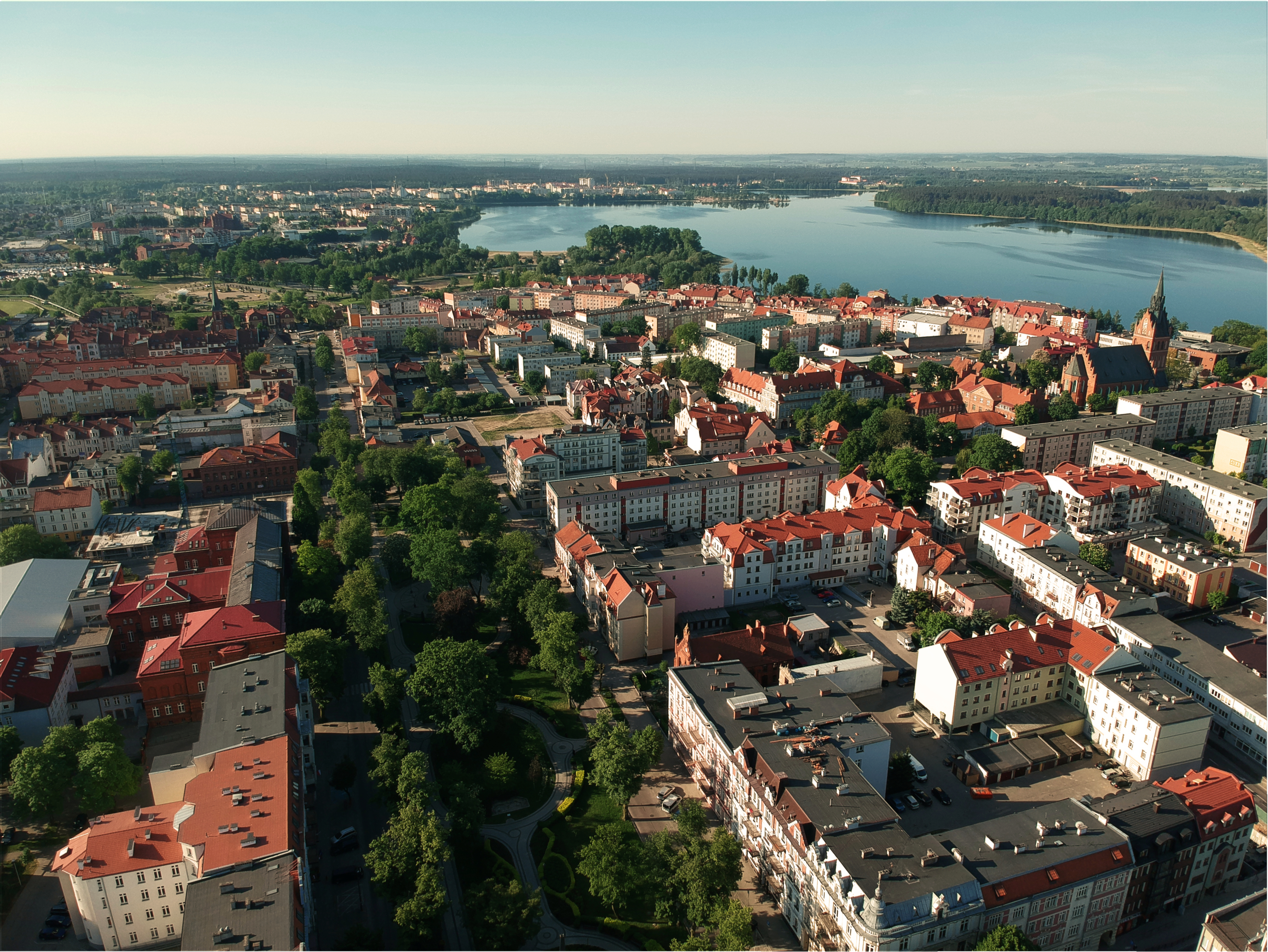
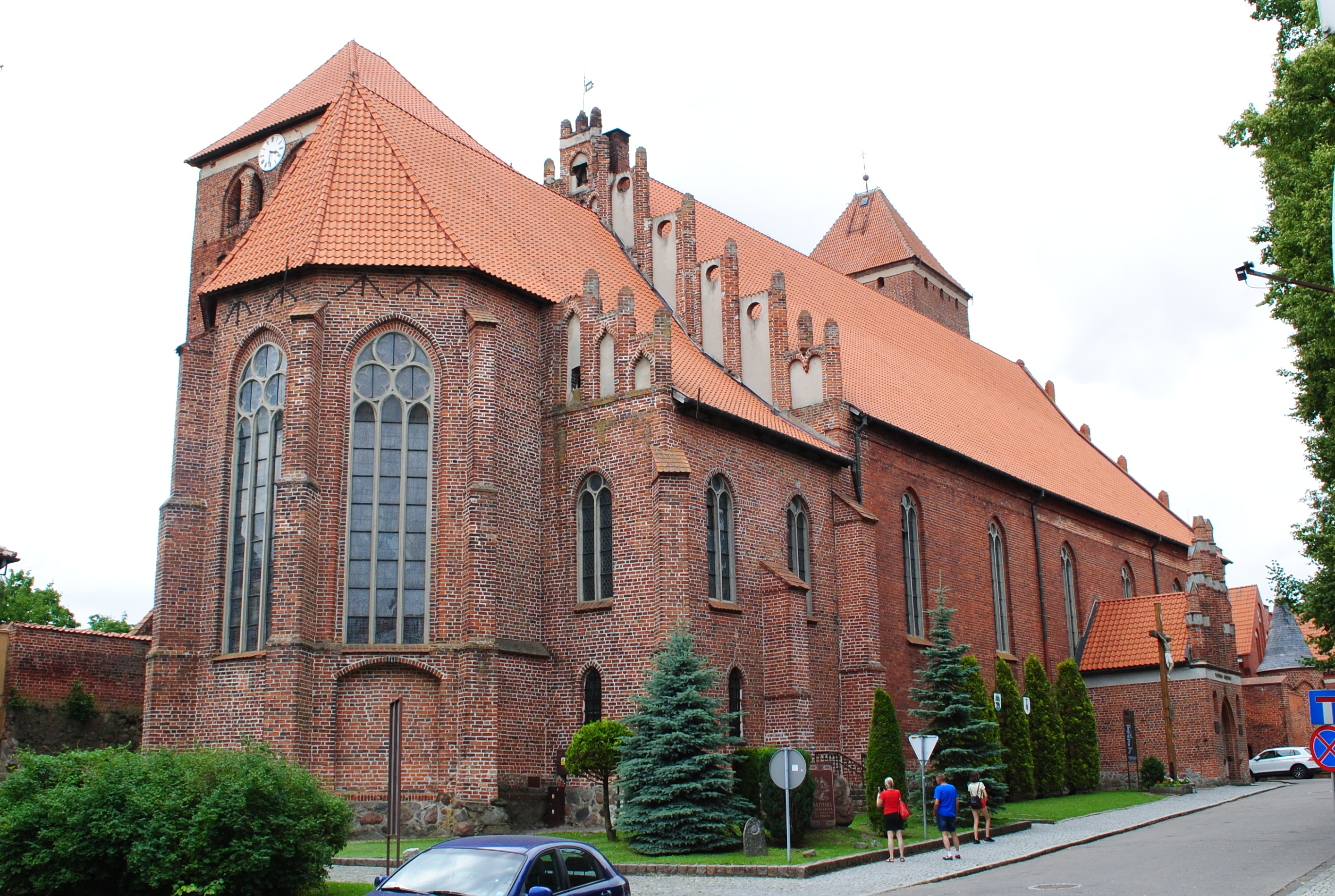
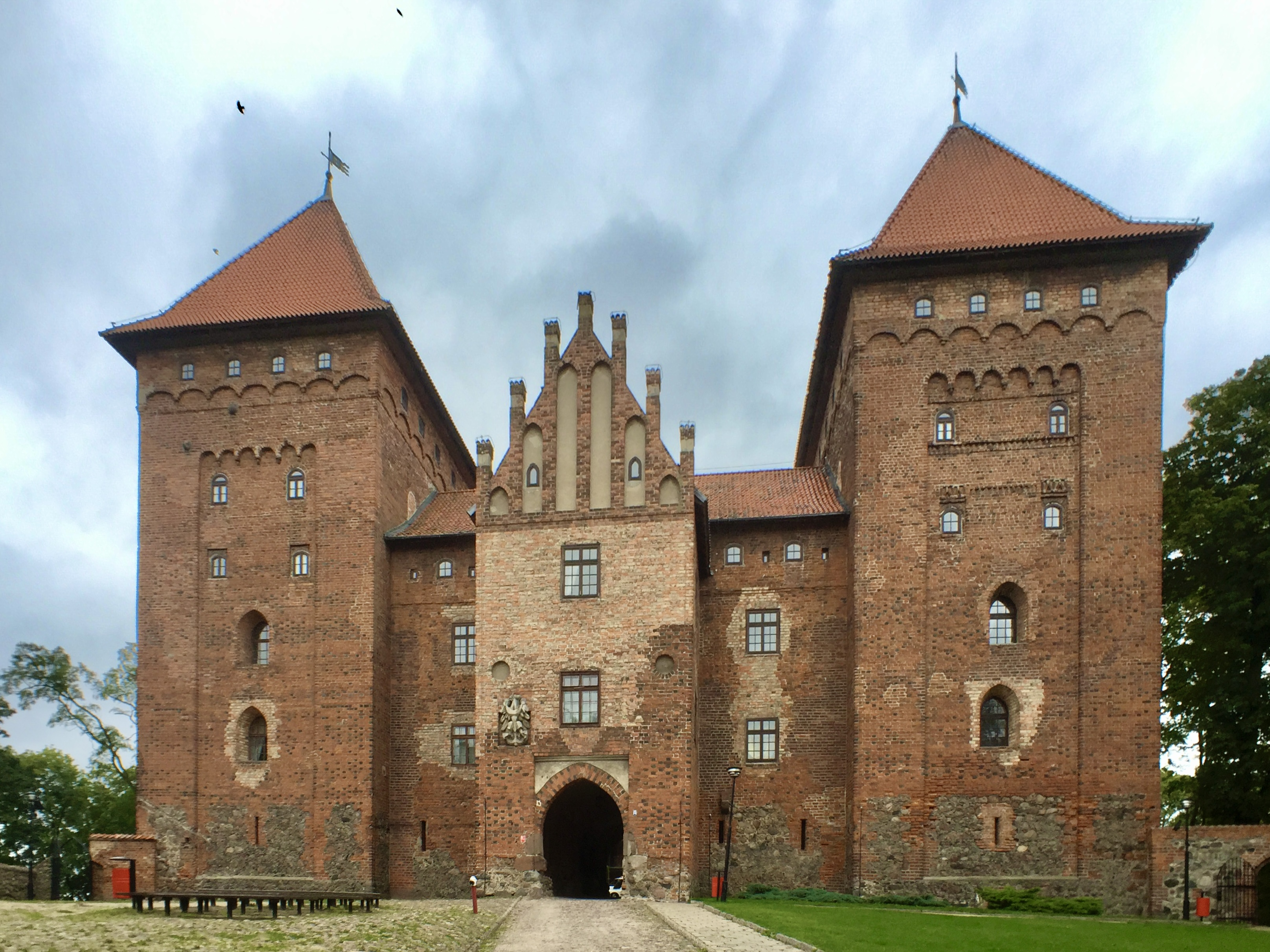
- Lake Niegocin Mikołajki Grunwald battlefield Ełk Saint George Basilica in Kętrzyn Castle in Nidzica

- Flag

- Location of Masuria (shown in blue) on the map of Poland
- Country: Poland
- Voivodeship: Warmian–Masurian
- Largest city: Ełk

Area
  - Total: 10,000 km^{2} (3,900 sq mi)

Population
  - Total: 500,000
  - Density: 50/km^{2} (130/sq mi)
- Demonym: Masurian
- Time zone: UTC+1 (CET)
  - Summer (DST): UTC+2 (CEST)
- Primary airport: Olsztyn-Mazury Airport

Masuria (Polish: Mazury [maˈzurɨ]; Masurian: Mazurÿ; German: Masuren [maˈzuːʁən]) is an ethnographic and geographic region in northern and northeastern Poland. Masuria occupies much of the Masurian Lake District, known for its 2,000 lakes and a finalist of the New7Wonders of Nature initiative. Administratively, it is part of the Warmian–Masurian Voivodeship (administrative area/province). Its biggest city, often regarded as its capital, is Ełk. The region covers a territory of some 10,000 km2, which is inhabited by approximately 500,000 people.

Masuria is bordered by Warmia, Powiśle and Chełmno Land in the west, Mazovia in the south, Podlachia and Suwałki Region in the east, and Lithuania Minor in the north.

== History ==
=== Prehistory and early history ===
Some of the earliest archeological finds in Masuria were found at Dudka and Szczepanki sites and belonged to the subneolithic Zedmar culture. Indo-European settlers first arrived in the region during the 4th millennium BC, which in the Baltic would diversify into the satem Balto-Slavic branch which would ultimately give rise to the Balts as the speakers of the Baltic languages. The Balts would have become differentiated into Western and Eastern Balts in the late 1st millennium BC. The region was inhabited by ancestors of Western Balts – Old Prussians, Sudovians/Jotvingians, Scalvians, Nadruvians, and Curonians while the eastern Balts settled in what is now Lithuania, Latvia and Belarus.

The Greek explorer Pytheas (4th century BC) may have referred to the territory as Mentenomon and to the inhabitants as Guttones (neighbours of the Teutones, probably referring to the Goths). In AD 98 Tacitus described one of the tribes living near the Baltic Sea (Latin: Mare Suebicum) as Aestiorum gentes and amber-gatherers.

=== Old Prussians ===
Before the 13th century, the territory was inhabited by Old (Baltic) Prussians, a Baltic ethnic group that lived in Prussia (the area of the southeastern coastal region of the Baltic Sea neighbouring of the Baltic Sea around the Vistula Lagoon and the Curonian Lagoon). A part of the territory later called Masuria was then known as Galindia and was probably a peripheral, deeply forested and lightly populated area. Inhabitants of the now Masuria spoke a language now known as Old Prussian and had their own mythology. Although a 19th-century German political entity bore their name, they were not Germans. They were converted to Roman Catholicism in the 13th century, after conquest by the Knights of the Teutonic Order.

Estimates range from approximately 170,000 to 220,000 Old Prussians living in the entire Prussia around 1200. The wilderness was their natural barrier against attack by would-be invaders. During the Northern Crusades of the early 13th century, the Old Prussians used this vast forest as a broad zone of defence. They did so again against the Knights of the Teutonic Order, who had been invited to Poland by Konrad I of Masovia in 1226. The order's goal was to convert the native population to Christianity and baptise it by force if necessary. In the subsequent conquest, which lasted over 50 years, the original population was partly exterminated, particularly during the major Prussian rebellion of 1261–1283. A lot of Prussians went to Lithuania as war refugees too. But several Prussian noble families also accommodated the Knights to hold their power and possessions.

=== Teutonic Order ===
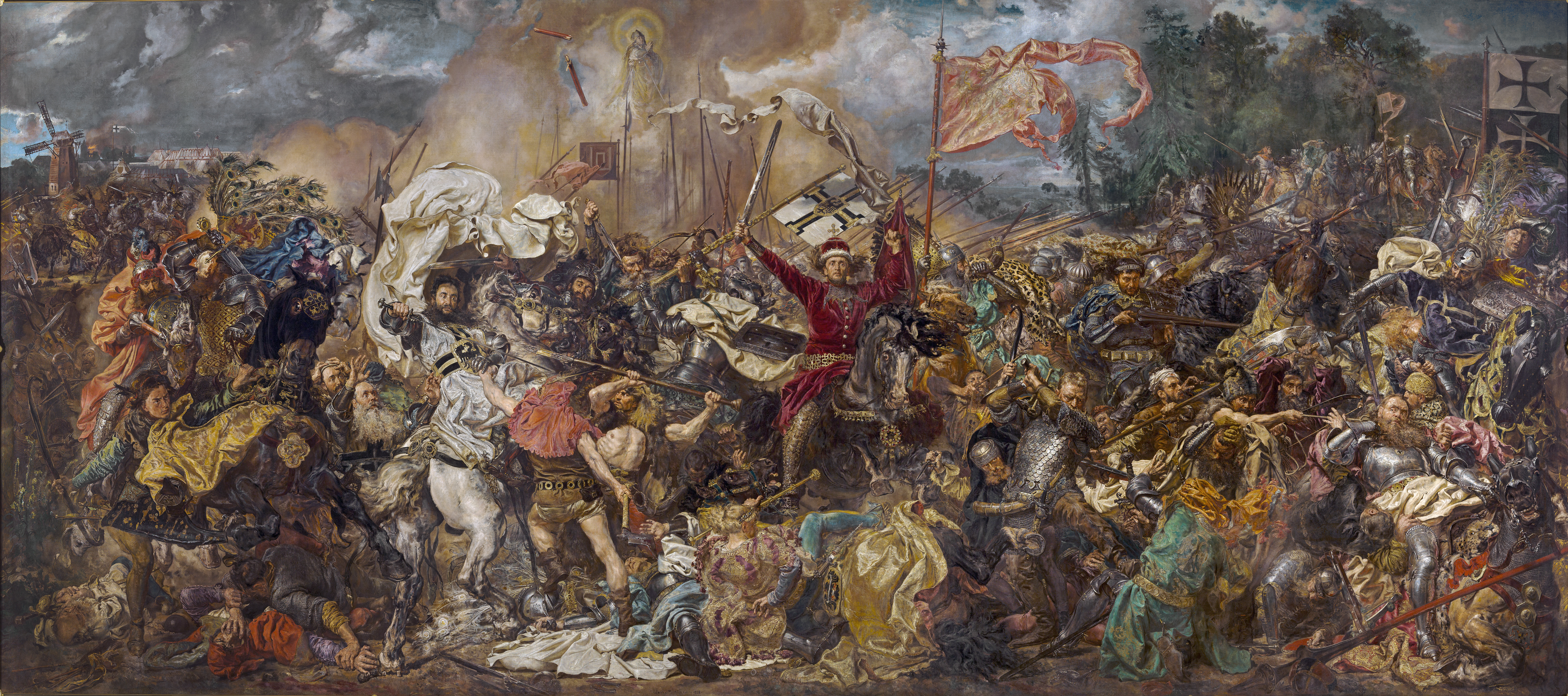
The Battle of Grunwald was fought in Masuria in 1410

After the Order's acquisition of Prussia, Poles (or more specifically, Mazurs, that is, inhabitants of the adjacent region of Mazovia) began to settle in the southeastern part of the conquered region. German, Dutch, Flemish, and Danish colonists entered the area afterward, from the northwest. The number of Polish settlers grew significantly again at the beginning of the 15th century, especially after the first and the second treaties of Thorn (Toruń), in 1411 and 1466 respectively, following the Thirteen Years' War and the final defeat of the order. The Battle of Grunwald took place in western Masuria in 1410. It was one of the largest battles of medieval Europe and ended in a Polish-Lithuanian victory over the Teutonic Knights. In 1440, the anti-Teutonic Prussian Confederation was founded, and various towns of Masuria joined it. Western Masuria with Ostróda, was, next to the Chełmno Land, the place of the most widespread participation of the nobility in the foundation of the Confederation. In 1454 upon the Confederation's request King Casimir IV Jagiellon signed the act of incorporation of the entire region including Masuria to Poland. However, after the subsequent Thirteen Years' War (1454–1466), the Teutonic Order regained authority over the region as a fief of the Polish Crown.

=== Ducal Prussia ===
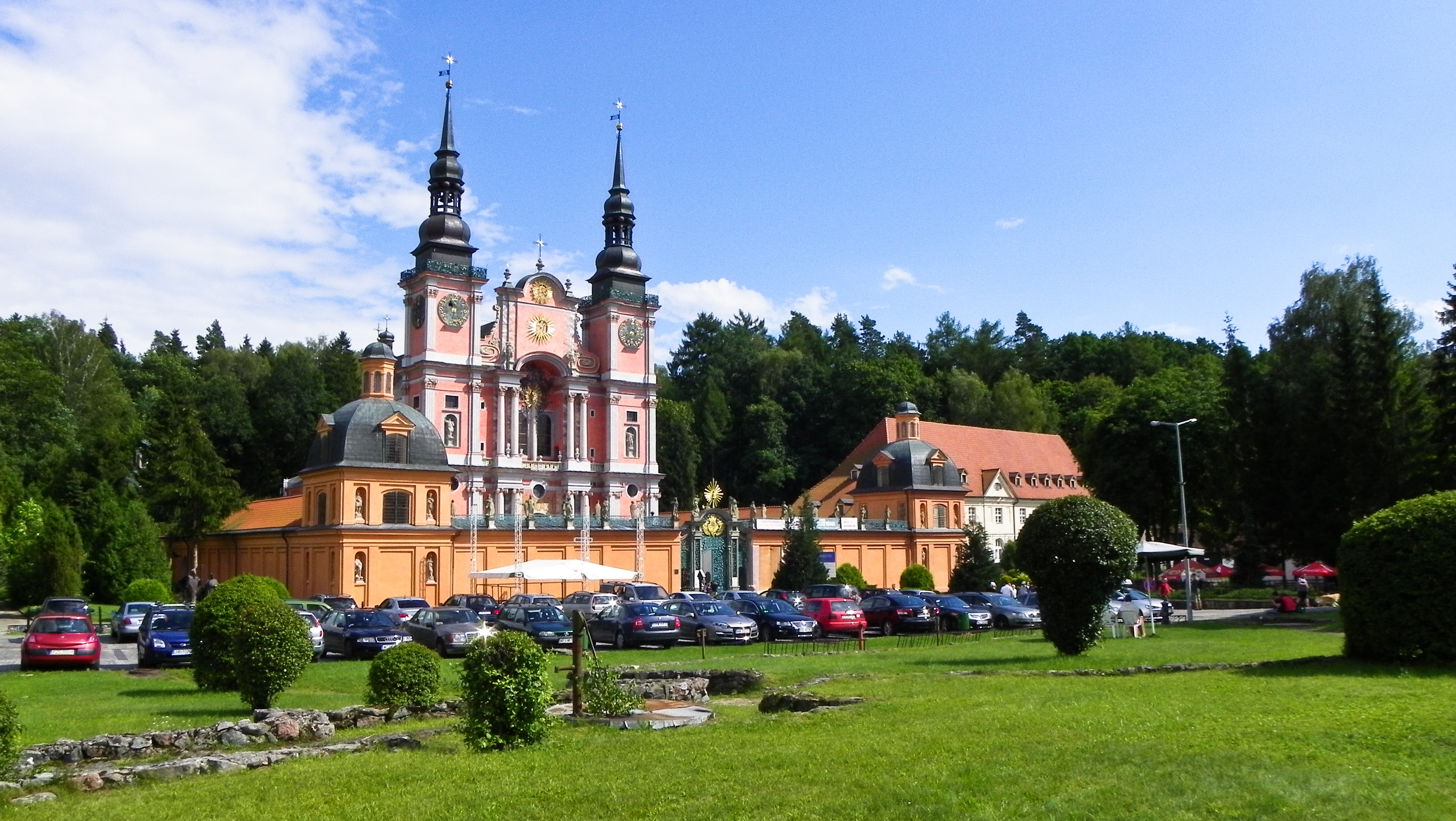
The Saint Mary's Sanctuary in Święta Lipka at the border of historical Warmia and Masuria was consecrated by Jesuits in 1619. It was once the site of apparitions and miracles and is one of Poland's finest examples of Baroque architecture, listed as a Historic Monument of Poland.

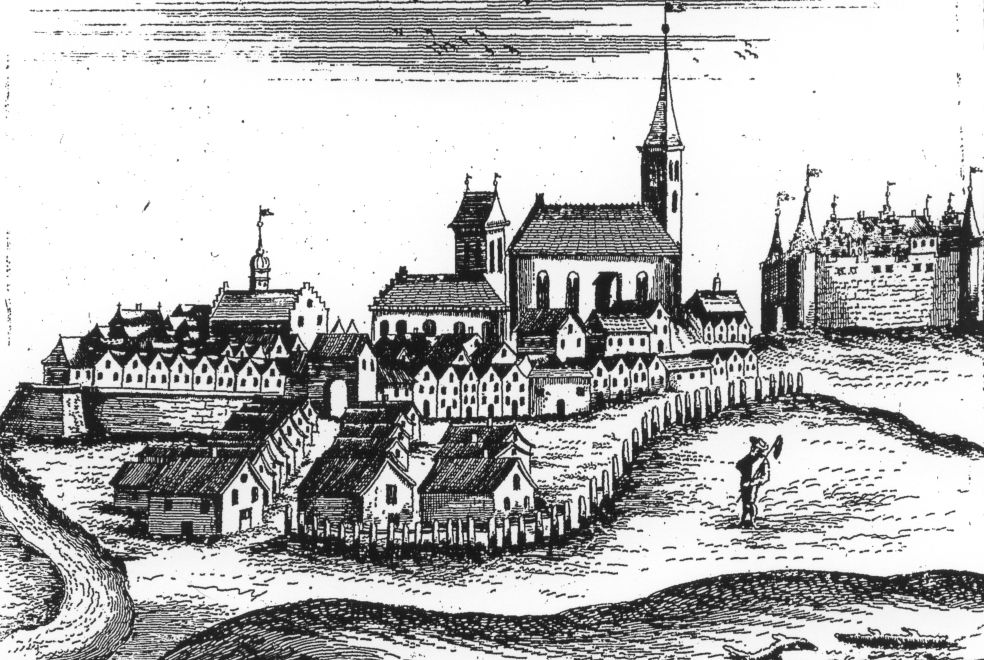
17th century view of Węgobork (now Węgorzewo), a typical Masurian town

The secularisation of the Teutonic Order in Prussia and the conversion of Albert of Prussia to Lutheranism in 1525 brought Prussia, including the area later called Masuria, to Protestantism. The Knights untied their bonds to the Catholic Church and became land-owning noblemen and the Duchy of Prussia was established as a vassal state of Poland. The Polish language predominated due to the many immigrants from Mazovia, who additionally settled the southern parts of Ducal Prussia, till then virgin part of (later Masuria) in the 16th century. While the southern countryside was inhabited by these – meanwhile Protestant – Polish-speakers, the very small southern towns constituted a mixed Polish and German-speaking population. The ancient Old Prussian language survived in parts of the countryside in the northern and central parts of Ducal Prussia until the early 18th century. At that time, they proved to be assimilated into the mass of German-speaking villagers and farmers. Areas that had many Polish language speakers were known as the Polish Departments.

Masuria became one of the leading centers of Polish Protestantism. In the mid-16th century, Lyck (Ełk) and Angerburg (Węgorzewo) became significant Polish printing centers. A renowned Polish high school, which attracted Polish students from different regions, was founded in Ełk in eastern Masuria in 1546 by Hieronim Malecki, Polish translator and publisher, who contributed to the creation of the standards and patterns of the Polish literary language. The westernmost part of Masuria, the Osterode (Ostróda) county, in 1633 came under the administration of one of the last dukes of the Piast dynasty, John Christian of Brieg.

After the death of Albert Frederick, Duke of Prussia in 1618, his son-in-law John Sigismund, Margrave of Brandenburg inherited the duchy (including Masuria), combining the two territories under a single dynasty and forming Brandenburg-Prussia. In 1656, during the Battle of Prostki, the forces of Polish–Lithuanian Commonwealth, including 2,000 Tatar raiders, beat the allied Swedish and Brandenburg army capturing Bogusław Radziwiłł. The war resulted in the destruction of most towns, 249 villages and settlements, and 37 churches were destroyed. Over 50% of the population of Masuria died within the years 1656–1657, 23,000 were killed, another 80,000 died of diseases and famine, and 3,400 people were enslaved and deported to Russia. The Treaty of Wehlau ended the sovereignty of Poland in 1657.

From 1709 to 1711, in all of Ducal Prussia, between 200,000 and 245,000 out of 600,000 inhabitants died from the Black Death. In Masuria, the death toll varied regionally; while 6,789 people died in the district of Rhein (Ryn), only 677 died in Seehesten (Szestno). In Lötzen (Giżycko), 800 out of 919 people died. Losses in population were compensated by migration of Protestant settlers or refugees from Scotland, Salzburg (expulsion of Protestants 1731), France (Huguenot refugees after the Edict of Fontainebleau in 1685), and especially from the counterreformed Polish–Lithuanian Commonwealth, including Polish brethren expelled from Poland in 1657. The last group of refugees to emigrate to Masuria were the Russian Philipons (as "Old Believers" opposed to the State Church) in 1830, when King Frederick William III of Prussia granted them asylum.

=== Kingdom of Prussia ===
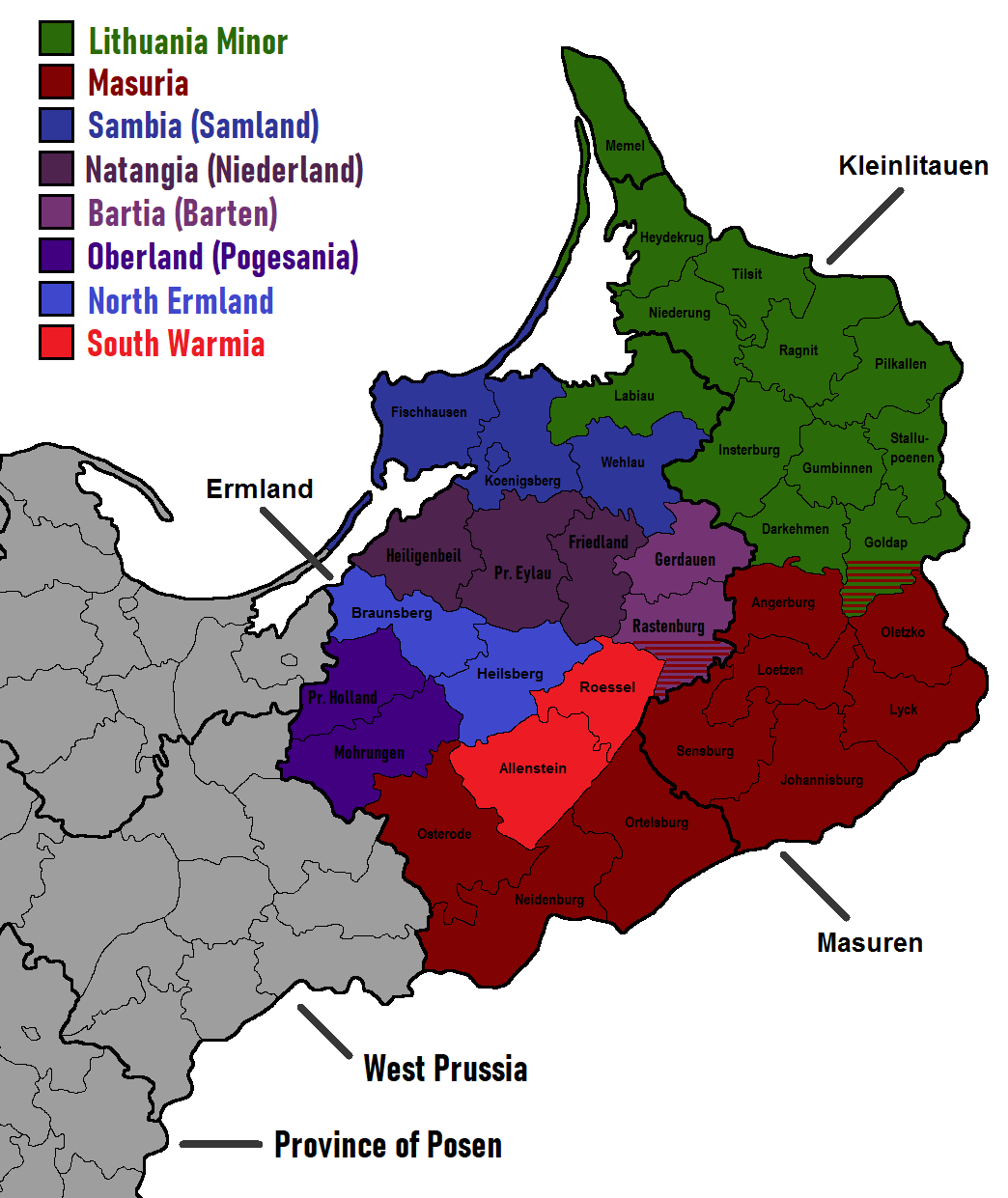
Masuria within East Prussia

The region became part of the Kingdom of Prussia with the coronation of King Frederick I of Prussia in 1701 in Königsberg. Masuria became part of a newly created administrative province of East Prussia upon its creation in 1773. The name Masuria began to be used officially after new administrative reforms in Prussia after 1818. Masurians referred to themselves during that period as "Polish Prussians" or as "Staroprusaki" (Old Prussians) During the Napoleonic Wars and Polish national liberation struggles, in 1807, several towns of northern and eastern Masuria were taken over by Polish troops under the command of generals Jan Henryk Dąbrowski and Józef Zajączek. Some Masurians showed considerable support for the Polish uprising in 1831, and maintained many contacts with Russian-held areas of Poland beyond the border of Prussia, the areas being connected by common culture and language; before the uprising people visited each other's country fairs and much trade took place, with smuggling also widespread. Nevertheless, their Lutheran belief and a traditional adherence to the Prussian royal family kept Masurians and Poles separated. Some early writers about Masurians - like Max Toeppen - postulated Masurians in general as mediators between German and Slavic cultures.

Germanisation policies in Masuria included various strategies, first and foremost they included attempts to propagate the German language and to eradicate the Polish language as much as possible; German became the obligatory language in schools from 1834 on. In 1813 the old Polish school in Ełk, founded in 1546, was transformed into a German gymnasium. Fryderyk Tymoteusz Krieger, superintendent of the school, actively defended the rights of local Poles to use the Polish language, becoming the first pastor in Masuria to protest against the initiated Germanization of Polish schools in the region. Prussian authorities launched investigations against Krieger three times. Polish people who had acquired knowledge of the German language, including children whose parents did not speak German, were officially classified as ethnic Germans by the authorities and were denied the right to attend Polish church services. In 1836, a synod was organized in Olecko which protested against Germanization policies. The synod's protest was signed by all the pastors in the Olecko County, and its arguments were later used by the well-known defenders of the Polish language in Masuria, Gustaw Gizewiusz and Krzysztof Celestyn Mrongovius. The protests were successful; however, the campaign of Germanisation was resumed in 1865 and later intensified. The Lutheran churches and their vicars principally exerted their spiritual care in Polish as concerned to Polish mother tongue parishioners.

Polish secret resistance was active and smuggled weapons through the region to the Russian Partition of Poland during the January Uprising of 1863–1864. Polish insurgents fled from the Russians to Masuria and found shelter in various towns and villages. Some insurgents reorganized in Masuria to return to the Russian Partition of Poland and continue the fight. Newly formed Polish units from the Prussian Partition of Poland also passed through Masuria, and even clashed with Prussian troops in the region. Several local resistance members, smugglers and insurgents were arrested and imprisoned by the Prussians. Local residents protested against the deportation of insurgents to the Russian Partition.

==== Ethno-linguistic structure ====
Mother tongue of the inhabitants of Masuria, by county, during the first half of the 19th century:

Ethno-linguistic structure of Masurian counties in the first half of the 19th century, according to German data
County (German name)	Year	Polish-speakers	%	German-speakers	%	Lithuanian-speakers	%	Total population
Pisz (Johannisburg)	1825	28,552	93%	2,146	7%	0	0%	30,698
Nidzica (Neidenburg)	1825	27,467	93%	2,149	7%	1	0%	29,617
Szczytno (Ortelsburg)	1825	34,928	92%	3,100	8%	0	0%	38,028
Ełk (Lyck)	1832	29,246	90%	3,413	10%	4	0%	32,663
Giżycko (Lötzen)	1832	20,434	89%	2,528	11%	25	0%	22,987
Mrągowo (Sensburg)	1825	22,391	86%	3,769	14%	5	0%	26,165
Olecko (Oletzko)	1832	23,302	84%	4,328	16%	22	0%	27,652
Ostróda (Osterode)	1828	23,577	72%	9,268	28%	0	0%	32,845
Węgorzewo (Angerburg)	1825	12,535	52%	11,756	48%	60	0%	24,351
Gołdap (Goldap)	1825	3,940	16%	17,412	70%	3,559	14%	24,911
TOTAL	1825-32	226,372	78%	59,869	21%	3,676	1%	289,917

The Darkehmen/Darkiejmy (now Ozyorsk) and Gołdap counties, as transitional counties between Masuria and the Lithuania Minor region to the north, were inhabited by notable numbers of both ethnic Poles and Lithuanians.

=== German Empire ===
A map of former historic Prussia with the Masurian region in purple.

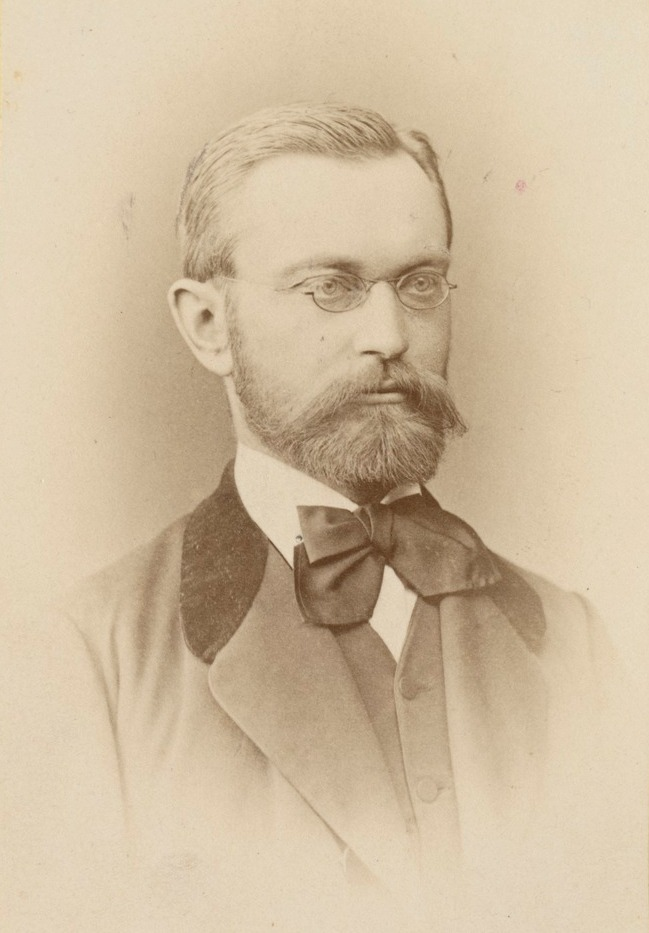
Wojciech Kętrzyński was a Polish historian born in Masuria who expressed that ethnic Masurs are closely related to Poles and emphasized Polish claims on the Masuria region.

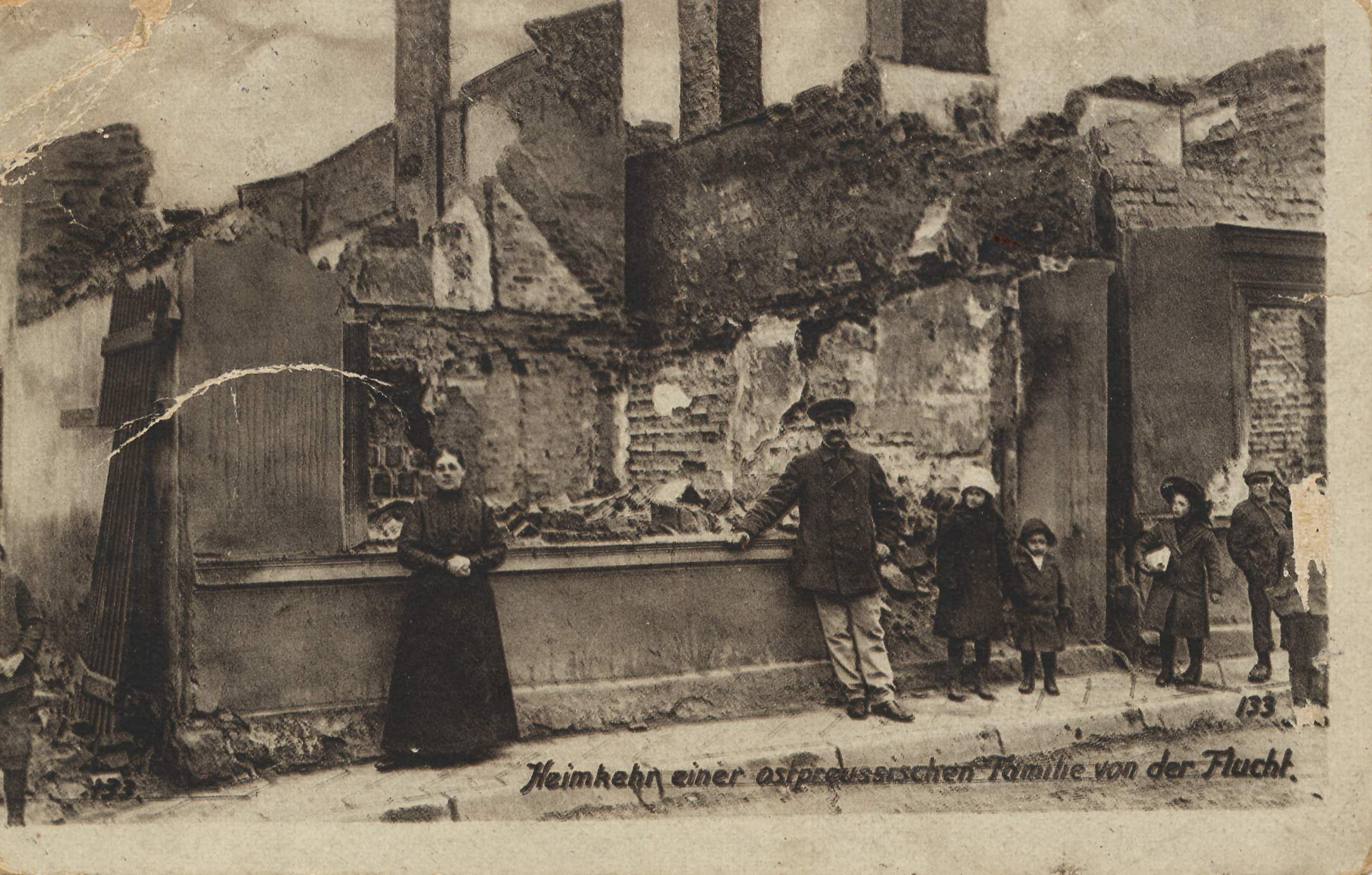
Destructions of World War I at Arys (Orzysz)

After the Unification of Germany into the German Empire in 1871, the last lessons that made use of the Polish language were removed from schools in 1872. Masurians who expressed sympathy for Poland were deemed "national traitors" by German public opinion, especially after 1918 when the new Polish republic laid claims to, up to then German, areas inhabited by Polish speakers. According to Stefan Berger, after 1871 the Masurians in the German Empire were seen in a view that while acknowledging their "objective" Polishness (in terms of culture and language) they felt "subjectively" German and thus should be tightly integrated into the German nation-state; Berger concludes that such arguments of German nationalists were aimed at integrating Masurian (and Silesian) territory firmly into the German Reich.

During the period of the German Empire, the Germanisation policies in Masuria became more widespread; children using Polish in playgrounds and classrooms were widely punished by corporal punishment, and authorities tried to appoint Protestant pastors who would use only German instead of bilinguality and this resulted in protests of local parishioners. According to Jerzy Mazurek, the native Polish-speaking population, like in other areas with Polish inhabitants, faced discrimination of Polish language activities from Germanised local administration. In this climate, a first resistance defending the rights of the rural population was organised, according to Jerzy Mazurek, usually by some teachers engaged in publishing Polish language newspapers.

Despite anti-Polish policies, such Polish language newspapers as the Pruski Przyjaciel Ludu (Prussian Friend of People) or the Kalendarz Królewsko-Pruski Ewangelicki (Royal Prussian Evangelical Calendar) or bilingual journals like the Oletzkoer Kreisblatt - Tygodnik Obwodu Oleckiego continued to be published in Masuria. In contrast to the Prussian-oriented periodicals, in the late 19th century, such newspapers as Przyjaciel Ludu Łecki and Mazur were founded by members of the Warsaw-based Komitet Centralny dla Śląska, Kaszub i Mazur (Central Committee for Silesia, Kashubia and Masuria), influenced by Polish politicians like Antoni Osuchowski or Juliusz Bursche, to strengthen the Polish identity in Masuria. The Gazeta Ludowa (The Folk's Newspaper) was published in Lyck in 1896–1902, with 2,500 copies in 1897 and the Mazur in Ortelsburg (Szczytno) after 1906 with 500 copies in 1908 and 2,000 prior to World War I.

Polish activists started to regard Masurians as "Polish brothers" after Wojciech Kętrzyński had published his pamphlet O Mazurach in 1872 and Polish activists engaged in active self-help against repressions by the German state Kętrzyński fought against attempts to Germanise Masuria However, the attempts to create a Masurian Polish national consciousness, largely originating from nationalist circles of Province of Posen (Poznań) in the Prussian Partition of Poland, faced the resistance of the Masurians, who, despite having similar folk traditions and linguistics to Poles, regarded themselves as Prussians and later Germans. and were loyal to the Hohenzollern dynasty, the Prussian and German state. After World War I the editor of the Polish language Mazur described the Masurians as "not nationally conscious, on the contrary, the most loyal subjects of the Prussian king". However, a minority of Masurians did exist who expressed Polish identity.

After 1871 there appeared resistance among the Masurians towards Germanisation efforts, the so-called Gromadki movement was formed which supported use of Polish language and came into conflict with German authorities; while most of its members viewed themselves as loyal to the Prussian state, a part of them joined the Pro-Polish faction of Masurians. The programme of Germanisation started to unite and mobilise Polish people in Polish-inhabited territories held by Germany including Masuria A Polish-oriented party, the Mazurska Partia Ludowa ("People's Party of Masuria"), was founded in 1897.

The German authorities in their efforts of Germanisation tried to claim the Masurian language separate from Polish by classifying it as a non-Slavic language different from Polish one, this was reflected in official census Thus, the Masurian population in 1890, 143,397 was reported to the Prussian census as having German as their language (either primary or secondary), 152,186 Polish and 94,961 Masurian. In 1910, the German language was reported by German authorities as used by 197,060, Polish by 30,121 and Masurian by 171,413. Roman Catholics generally opted for the Polish language, and Protestants appreciated Masurian. In 1925, German authorities reported 40,869 inhabitants as having declared Masurian as their native tongue and 2,297 as Polish. However, the last result may have been a result of politics at the time, the desire of the population to be German after the trauma evoked by the 1920 plebiscite. So the province could be presented as – so-called – "purely German"; in reality, the Masurian dialect was still in use among bilinguals.

Overall efforts at Germanization in Masuria were limited compared to other Prussian regions, as the Masurians largely assimilated voluntarily. As a result, there was, for example, little meaningful opposition to German as the language of instruction, and many Masurian families even preferred it. In the three decades preceding World War I, the Polish national movement made sustained efforts to win over the Masurians, but achieved very limited success. Polish-language newspapers rarely reached circulations exceeding 1,000, and support for Polish candidates in Reichstag elections seldom surpassed 1% of the local electorate.

Throughout industrialisation in the late 19th century, about 10% of the Masurian populace emigrated to the Ruhr Area, where about 180,000 Masurians lived in 1914. Wattenscheid, Wanne and Gelsenkirchen were the centers of Masurian emigration and Gelsenkirchen–Schalke was even called Klein (little)–Ortelsburg before 1914. Masurian newspapers like the Przyjaciel Ewangeliczny and the Gazeta Polska dla Ludu staropruskiego w Westfalii i na Mazurach but also the German language Altpreußische Zeitung were published.

During World War I, the Battle of Tannenberg and the First and Second Battle of the Masurian Lakes between Imperial Germany and the Russian Empire took place within the borders of Masuria in 1914. After the war, the League of Nations held the East Prussian plebiscite on 11 July 1920 to determine if the people of the southern districts of East Prussia wanted to remain within East Prussia or to join the Second Polish Republic. Polish organisations and activists were harassed by German militias, and those actions included attacks and some supposed murders of Polish activists; Masurs who supported voting for Poland were singled out and subjected to terror and repressions. In April 1920, the German Sicherheitswehr even battered Italian soldiers stationed in Ełk, two fatally.

Names of those Masurs supporting the Polish side were published in German newspapers, and their photos were presented in German shops; afterwards, regular hunts were organised after them by German militias terrorizing the Polish minded population. At least 3,000 Warmian and Masurian activists who were engaged for the Polish side decided to flee the region. At the same time also local police officials were engaged in active surveillance of the Polish minority and attacks against Polish activists. Before the plebiscite Poles started to flee the region to escape the German harassment and Germanisation policies.

The Polish campaign received virtually no support from the local population – not from the Germans, and not from the Masurians either, whom the campaign was primarily intended to win over.

The results determined that 99.32% of the voters in Masuria proper chose to remain with the province of East Prussia. Their traditional religious belief in Lutheranism kept them away from Polish national consciousness, dominated by Roman Catholicism. In fact, almost only Catholics voted for Poland in the plebiscite. They were to be found as a majority in the villages around the capital Allenstein (Olsztyn) in Warmia, where Polish cultural activism took hold between 1919 and 1932. Moreover, the plebiscite took place during the time when Polish–Soviet War threatened to erase the Polish state. As a result, even many Poles of the region voted for Germany out of fear that if the area was allocated to Poland, it would fall under Soviet rule. After the plebiscite in German areas of Masuria, attacks on the Polish population commenced by German mobs, and Polish priests and politicians were driven from their homes After the plebiscite, at least 10,000 Poles had to flee German held Masuria to Poland.

=== Interbellum ===
==== Polish Masuria — the Działdowo county ====
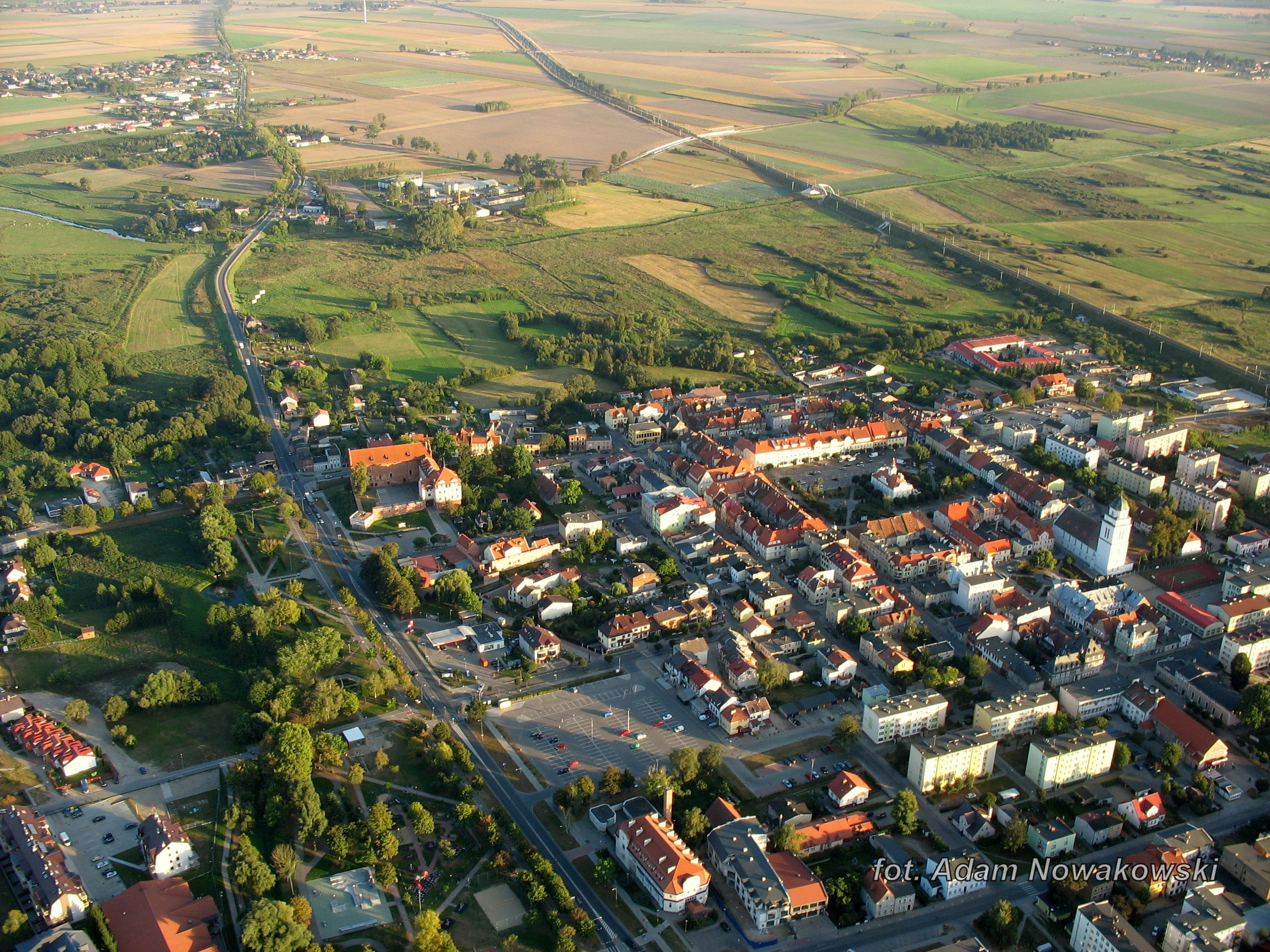
Aerial view of Działdowo

The region of Działdowo (Soldau), where according to the official German census of 1910 ethnic Germans formed a minority of 37.3%, was excluded from the plebiscite and became part of Poland. This was reasoned with placing the railway connection between Warsaw and Danzig (Gdańsk), of vital importance to Poland as it connected central Poland with its recently obtained seacoast, completely under Polish sovereignty. Działdowo itself counted about 24,000 people, of which 18,000 were Masurians.

According to the municipal administration of Rybno, after World War I, Poles in Działdowo believed that they would be quickly joined with Poland, they organised secret gatherings during which the issue of rejoining the Polish state with the help of the Polish military was discussed. According to the Rybno administration, most active Poles in that subregion included Jóżwiakowscy, Wojnowscy, Grzeszczowscy families working under the guidance of politician Leon Wojnowski who protested German attempts to remain Działdowo a part of Germany after the war; other local pro-Polish activists were Alfred Wellenger, Paczyński, Tadeusz Bogdański, Jóźwiakowski.

The historian Andreas Kossert describes that the incorporation happened despite protests of the local populace, the municipal authorities and the German Government, According to Kossert, 6,000 inhabitants of the region soon left the area.

In 1920, the candidate of the German Party in Poland, Ernst Barczewski, was elected to the Sejm with 74.6% of votes and to the Polish Senate with 34.6% of votes for the Bloc of National Minorities in 1928. During the Polish–Soviet War Działdowo was briefly occupied by the Red Army regarded as liberator from the Polish authority by the local German population, which hoisted the German flag, but it was soon recovered by the Polish Army.

During the interwar period, many native inhabitants of the Działdowo subregion left and migrated to Germany.

==== Weimar Republic and Nazi Germany ====
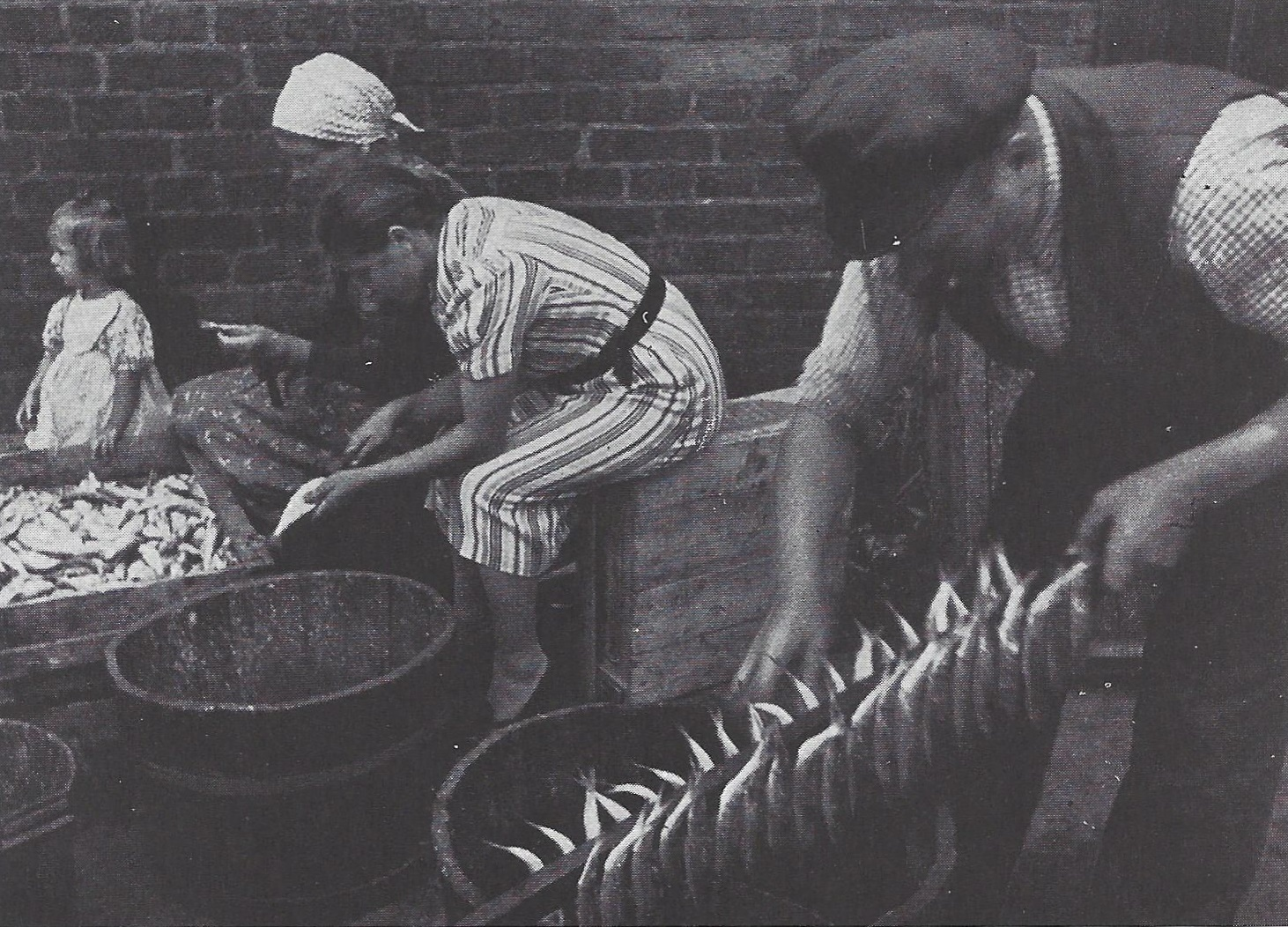
Fish treating and smoking in Nikolaiken (Mikołajki), 1920s

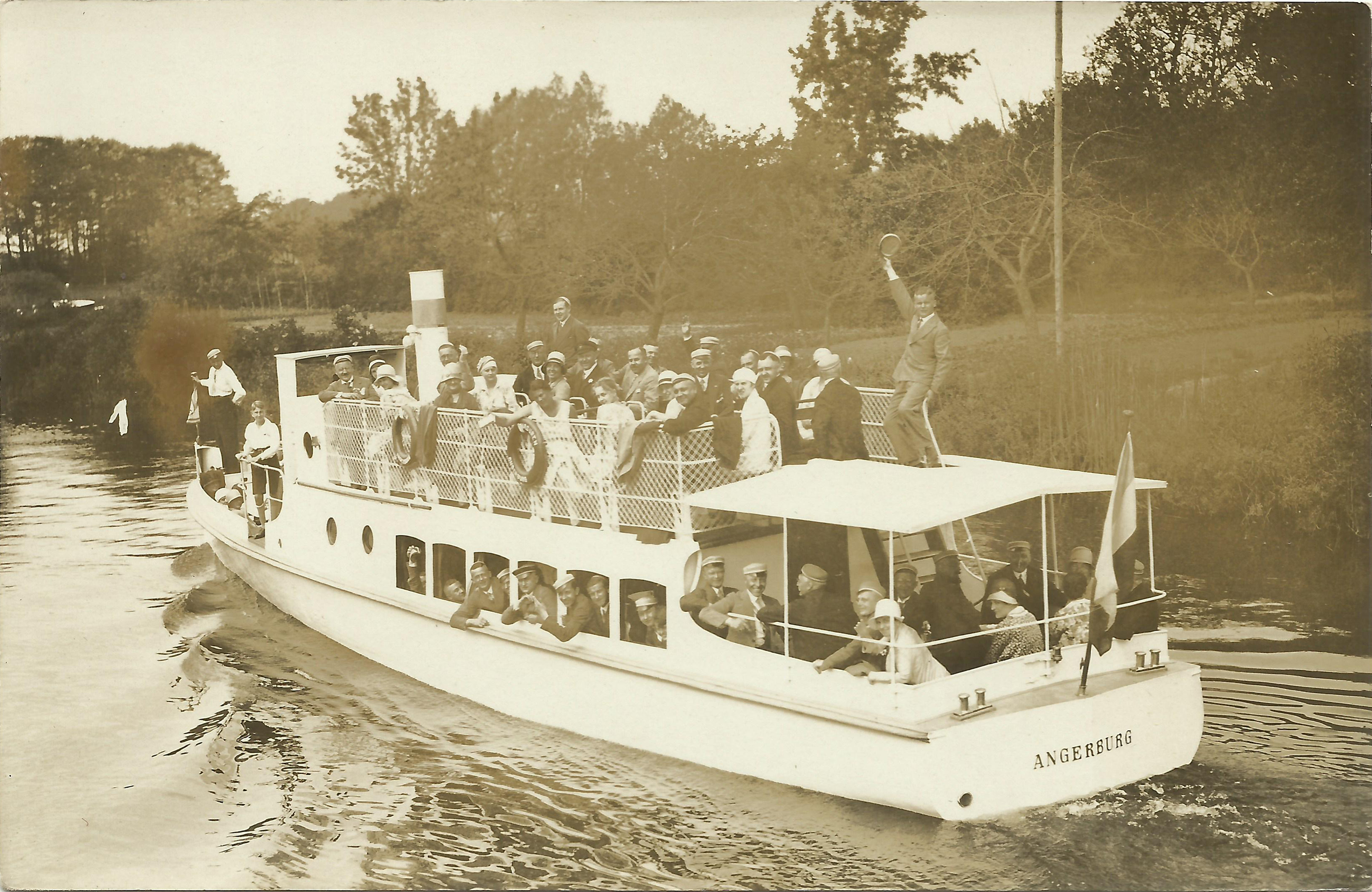
German tourists sailing near Angerburg (Węgorzewo), 1929

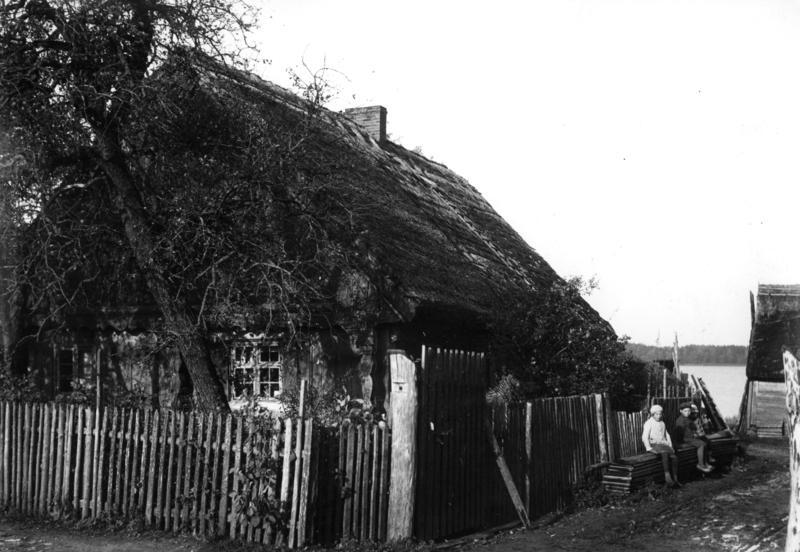
Ethnic Masurian children and Masurian farmhouse near a lake in 1931

Masuria was the only region of Germany directly affected by the battles of World War I. Damaged towns and villages were reconstructed with the aid of several twin towns from western Germany, like Cologne to Neidenburg (Nidzica), Frankfurt to Lötzen (Giżycko) and even Vienna to Ortelsburg (Szczytno). The architecture is still surprisingly distinct, being of modern Central European character. However, Masuria was still largely agrarian-oriented and suffered from the economic decline after World War I, additionally badly affected by the creation of the so-called Polish Corridor, which raised freight costs to the traditional markets in Germany. The later implemented Osthilfe had only a minor influence on Masuria as it privileged larger estates, while Masurian farms were generally small.

The interwar period was characterised by ongoing Germanisation policies, intensified especially under the Nazis.

In the 1920s, Masuria remained a heartland of conservatism with the German National People's Party as strongest party. The Nazi Party, having absorbed the conservative one, became the strongest party already in the Masurian constituencies in the elections of 1930 and received its best results in the poorest areas of Masuria with the highest rate of Polish speakers. Especially in the elections of 1932 and 1933 they reached up to 81% of votes in the district of Neidenburg and 80% in the district of Lyck. The Nazis used the economic crisis, which had significant effects in far-off Masuria, as well as traditional anti-Polish sentiments while at the same time Nazi political rallies were organised in the Masurian dialect during the campaigning.

In 1938, the Nazi government (1933–1945) changed thousands of still existing toponyms (especially names of cities and villages) of Old Prussian, Lithuanian and Polish origin to newly created German names; six thousand, that meant about 50% of the existing names were changed, but the countryside population stuck to their traditional names. Another renaming would take place after Masuria passed to Poland in 1945, with the bulk of the historic Polish names restored.

According to German author Andreas Kossert, Polish parties were financed and aided by the Polish government in Warsaw, and remained splintergroups without any political influence, e.g., in the 1932 elections the Polish Party received 147 votes in Masuria proper. According to Wojciech Wrzesiński (1963), the Polish organisations in Masuria had decided to lower their activity in order to escape acts of terror performed against Polish minority activists and organisations by Nazi activists. Jerzy Lanc, a teacher and Polish national who had moved to Masuria in 1931 to establish a Polish school in Piassutten (Piasutno), died in his home of carbon monoxide poisoning, most likely murdered by local German nationalists.

Due to severe persecution, from 1936, Polish organizations carried out their activities partly in conspiracy. Before the war the Nazi German state sent undercover operatives to spy on Polish organisations and created lists of people that were to be executed or sent to concentration camps. Information was gathered on who sent children to Polish schools, bought Polish press or took part in Polish ceremonies and organised repressions against these people were executed by Nazi militias. Polish schools, printing presses and headquarters of Polish institutions were attacked as well as homes of the most active Poles; shops owned by Poles were vandalised or demolished. Polish masses were dispersed, and Polish teachers were intimidated as members of the SS gathered under their locals performing songs like "Wenn das Polenblut vom Messer spritzt, dann geht's noch mal so gut" ("When Polish blood spurts from the knife, everything will be better").

The Nazi anti-Polish activities further intensified in 1939. Those Poles who were most active in politics were evicted from their own homes, while Polish newspapers and cultural houses were closed down in the region. In an attempt to rig the results of an upcoming census and understate the number of Poles in the region, the Germans terrorized the Polish population and attacked Polish organizations. In summer 1939 the German terror against the Poles even exceeded the terror from the period of the 1920 plebiscite. Polish church masses were banned between June and July in Warmia and Masuria. In August 1939, Germany introduced martial law in the region, which allowed for even more blatant persecution of Poles.

In the final moments of August 1939 all remains of political and cultural life of Polish minority was eradicated by the Nazis, with imprisonment of Polish activists and liquidation of Polish institutions. Seweryn Pieniężny, the chief editor of Gazeta Olsztyńska, who opposed Germanisation of Masuria, was interned, and other Polish activists in Masuria were also arrested.

Directors of Polish schools and teachers were imprisoned, as was the staff of Polish pre-schools in the Masuria region. They were often forced to destroy Polish signs, emblems and symbols of Polish institutions.

=== World War II ===
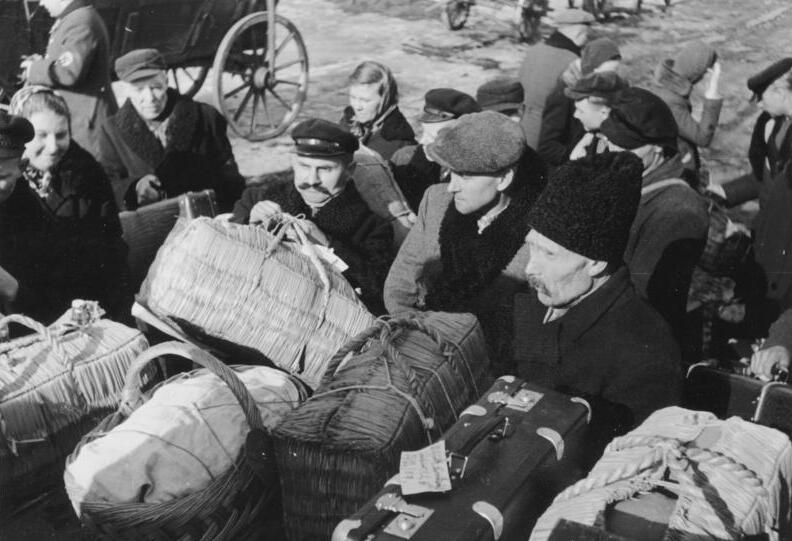
Baltic German settlers from Soviet occupied Lithuania arriving in German-occupied Działdowo, 1941

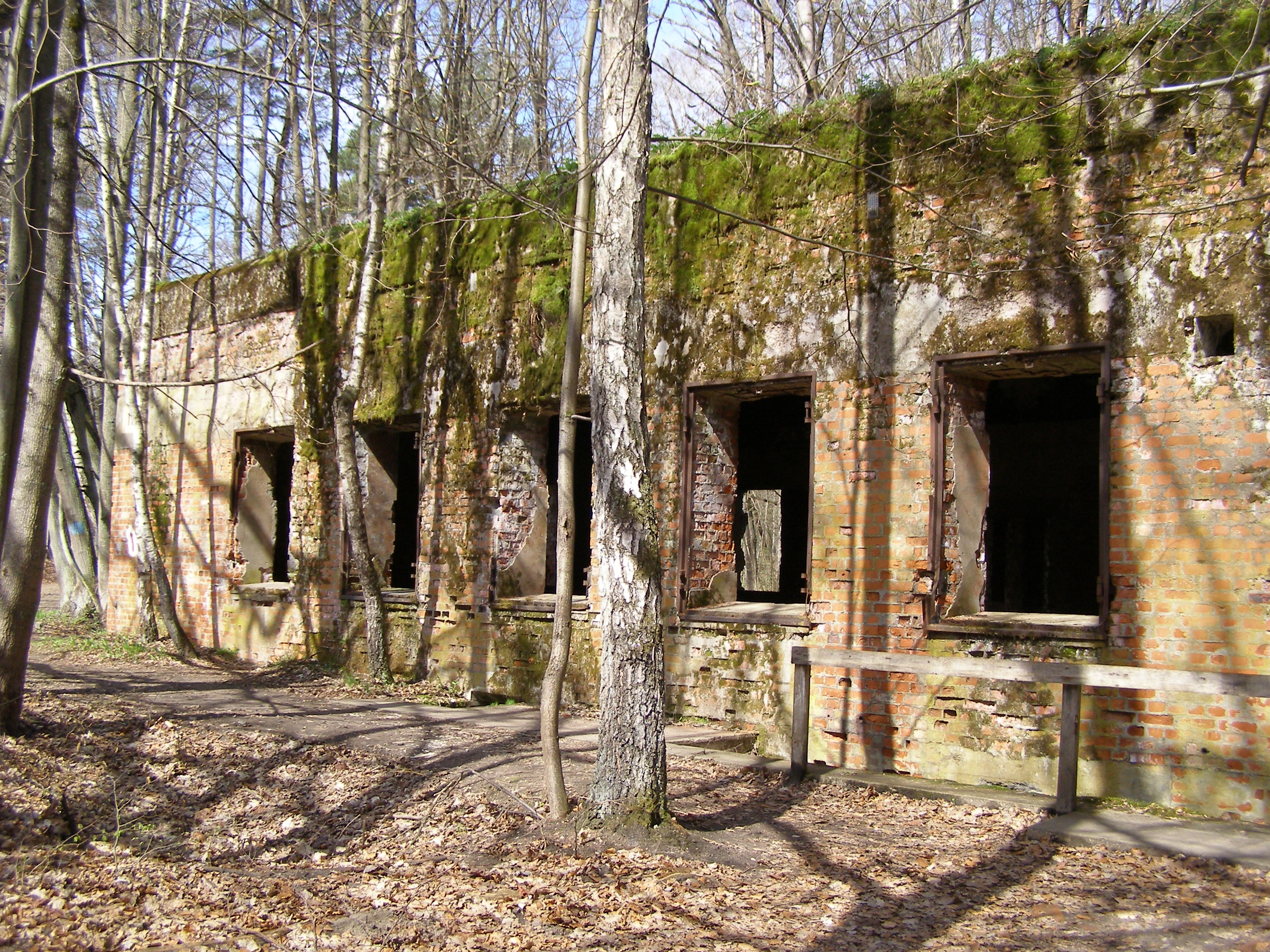
Remnants of the Wolf's Lair in Gierłoż

With the start of the German invasion of Poland and World War II on 1 September 1939, the German minority in the parts of Masuria attached to Poland after World War I organised themselves in paramilitary formations called Selbstschutz (selfdefense) and begun to engage in massacres of local Polish population; Poles were imprisoned, tortured and murdered while Masurians were sometimes forcefully placed on Volksliste.

From now on conscripted Masurians had to serve without exception in the German army invading Poland, and Russia two years later on. In addition, the Einsatzgruppe V Nazi paramilitary death squads entered German-occupied Działdowo to commit crimes against the Polish population. Only some of the Polish activists from Działdowo County were caught by the Germans, as most managed to flee and hide under assumed names in the General Government (German-occupied central Poland). Arrested Polish activists from the pre-war German part of Masuria were mostly deported to concentration camps, incl. Hohenbruch, Soldau, Stutthof, Sachsenhausen, Gusen and Ravensbrück.

In 1939, the German occupiers established a prisoner-of-war camp for captured Polish soldiers in Działdowo. In December 1939 it was converted into a camp for Polish civilians arrested during the Intelligenzaktion, and afterwards converted into the Soldau concentration camp, where 13,000 people were murdered by the Nazi German state during the war. Notable victims included the Polish bishops Antoni Julian Nowowiejski and Leon Wetmański, as well as the nun Mieczysława Kowalska. Additionally, almost 1,900 mentally ill patients from East Prussia and annexed areas of Poland were murdered there as well, in what was known as Action T4. Polish resistance in Masuria was organised by Paweł Nowakowski "Leśnik" commander of the Home Army's Działdowo district. The resistance operated one of the region's main smuggling points for Polish underground press in Ełk.

The Nazis believed that in future, the Masurians, as a separate non-German entity, would "naturally" disappear in the end, while those who would cling to their "foreignness" as one Nazi report mentioned, would be deported. Local Jews were considered by the Nazis to be subhuman and were to be exterminated. The Nazi authorities also executed Polish activists in Masuria and those who remained alive were sent to concentration camps.

In Masuria, Germany also established and operated the Stalag I-B and Oflag 63 prisoner-of-war camps for Polish, Belgian, French, Italian, Serbian and Soviet POWs, and built the Wolf's Lair, Adolf Hitler's first Eastern Front military headquarters where the 20 July assassination attempt occurred in 1944. In August 1943, the Uderzeniowe Bataliony Kadrowe attacked the village of Mittenheide (Turośl) in southern Masuria.

In 1943, "Związek Mazurski" was reactivated secretly by Masurian activists of the Polish Underground State in Warsaw and led by Karol Małłek. Związek Mazurski opposed Nazi Germany and asked Polish authorities during the war to liquidate German large landowners after the victory over Nazi Germany to help in agricultural reform and settlement of Masurian population, Masurian iconoclasts opposed to Nazi Germany requested to remove German heritage sites "regardless of their cultural value". Additionally a Masurian Institute was founded by Masurian activists in Radość near Warsaw in 1943.

In the final stages of World War II, Masuria was partially devastated by the retreating German and advancing Soviet armies during the Vistula-Oder Offensive. During the Soviet offensive, wartime rape was especially common in the region, as well as ethnic cleansing of the remaining German population. Around 75% of Germans and Masurians fled westward ahead of the advancing Red Army.

=== Masuria after World War II ===
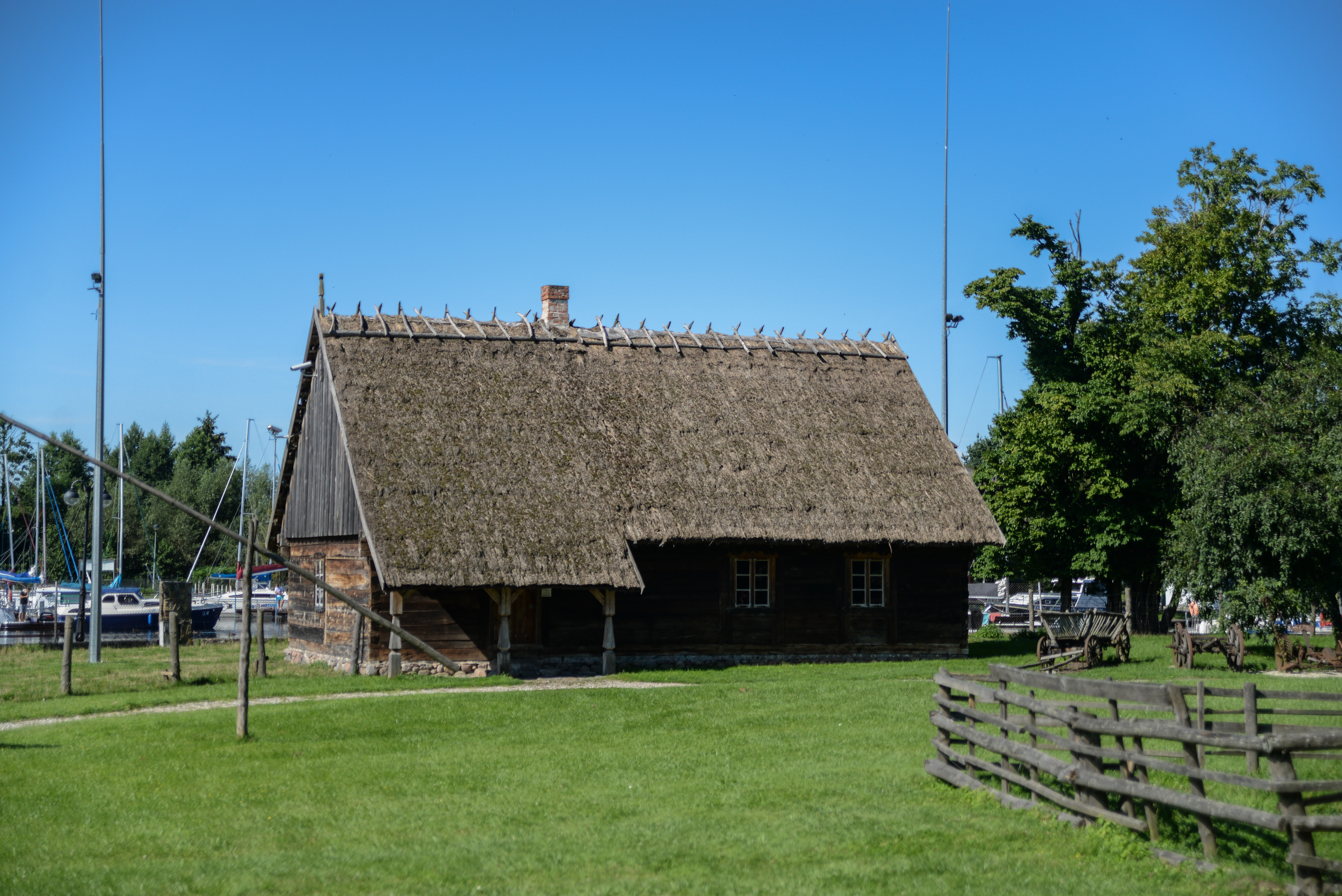
A reconstructed Masurian house in an open-air museum near Węgorzewo

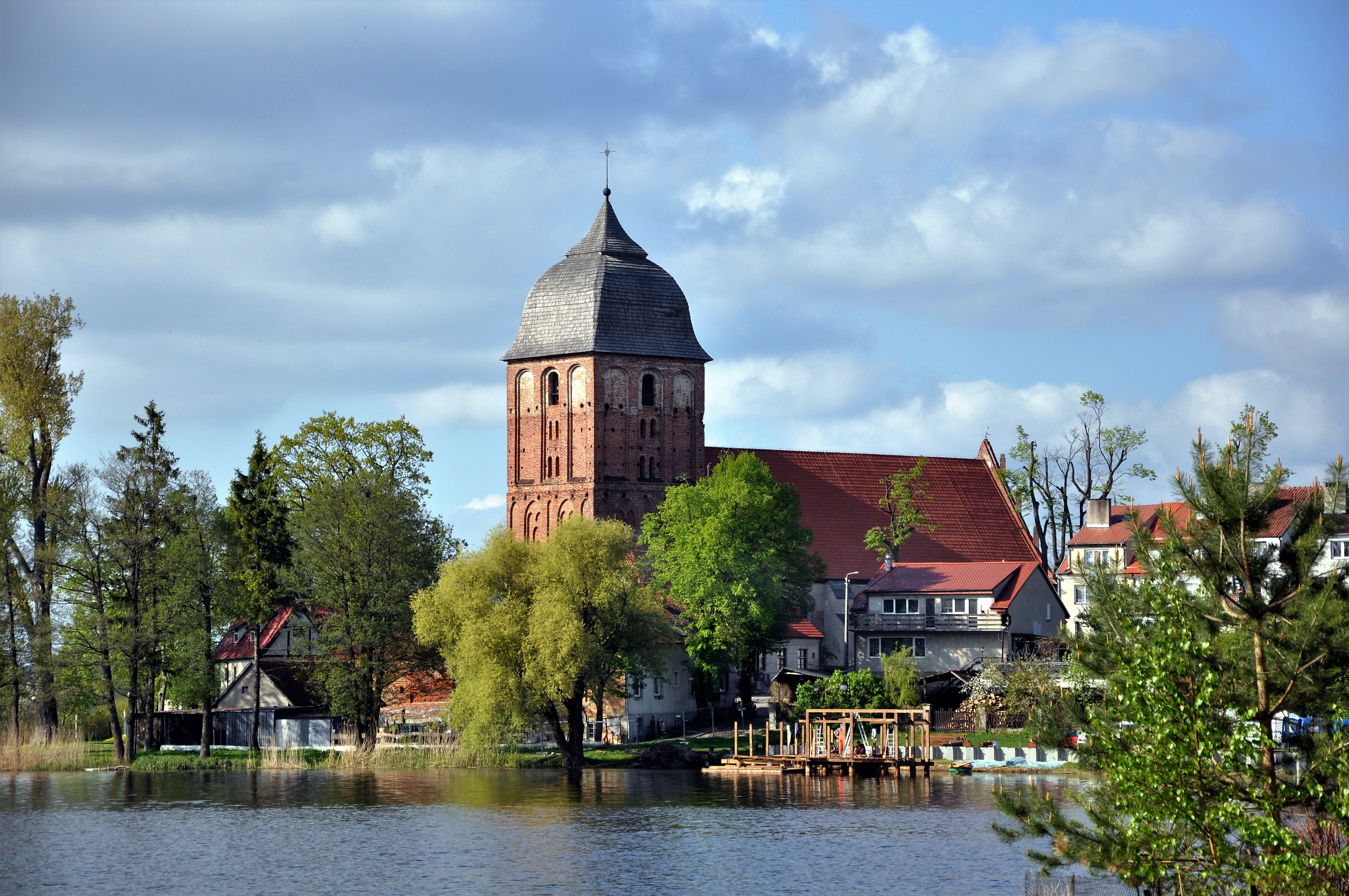
An active Lutheran church in Pasym

Already on May 23, 1945, the Soviets granted that a Polish administration be established in the region, which aroused British and American protest.

However, per the decisions made at the earlier Yalta Conference and the Potsdam Conference, the region passed to Poland, although with a Soviet-installed communist regime, pending a final peace conference with Germany. While the vast majority of the remaining Germans were expelled, the Masurians which stayed were subject to a "nationality verification", organised by the new Polish communist authorities. Their national loyalty was viewed with suspicion by both Soviet forces and Polish settlers. Most Masurians made clear they wished to stay in the region but had no desire to assimilate into Polish identity, with many refusing to apply for Polish citizenship. Poles from central Poland and the Polish areas annexed by the Soviet Union, as well as Ukrainians expelled from southern Poland throughout the Operation Vistula, were resettled in Masuria.

According to the Masurian Institute, the Masurian members of resistance against Nazi Germany who survived the war became active in 1945 in the region, working in Olsztyn in cooperation with new state authorities in administration, education and cultural affairs.

On 16 February 1946, the village of Gajrowskie was the site of the largest battle between Polish anti-communist partisans and communist forces in Masuria.

German author Andreas Kossert describes the post-war process of "national verification" as based on an ethnic racism which categorised the local populace according to their alleged ethnic background. A Polish-sounding last name or a Polish-speaking ancestor was sufficient to be regarded as "autochthonous" Polish.

In October 1946, 37,736 persons were "verified" as Polish citizens while 30,804 remained "unverified". A center of such "unverified" Masurians was the district of Mrągowo, where in early 1946 out of 28,280 persons, 20,580 were "unverified", while in October, 16,385 still refused to adopt Polish citizenship. However, even those who complied with the often used pressure by Polish authorities were, in fact, treated as Germans because of their Lutheran faith and their often rudimentary knowledge of Polish. Names were "Polonised" and the usage of the German language in public was forbidden. In the late 1940s, the pressure to sign the "verification documents" grew and in February 1949, the former chief of the Stalinist secret Police (UB) of Łódź, Mieczysław Moczar, started the "Great verification" campaign. Many unverified Masurians were imprisoned and accused of pro-Nazi or pro-American propaganda; even former pro-Polish activists and inmates of Nazi concentration camps were jailed and tortured. After the end of this campaign in the district of Mrągowo, only 166 Masurians were still "unverified".

In 1950, 1,600 Masurians left the country and in 1951, 35,000 people from Masuria and Warmia managed to obtain a declaration of their German nationality by the embassies of the United States and Great Britain in Warsaw. Sixty-three percent of the Masurians in the district of Mrągowo received such a document. In December 1956, Masurian pro-Polish activists signed a memorandum to the Communist Party leadership:

"The history of the people of Warmia and Masuria is full of tragedy and suffering. Injustice, hardship and pain often pressed on the shoulders of Warmians and Masurians [...] Dislike, injustice and violence surround us [...] They (Warmians and Masurians) demand respect for their differentness, grown in the course of seven centuries and for freedom to maintain their traditions".

Soon after the political reforms of 1956, Masurians were given the opportunity to join their families in West Germany. The majority (over 100 thousand) gradually left, and after the improvement of German–Polish relations by the German Ostpolitik of the 1970s, 55,227 persons from Warmia and Masuria moved to West Germany in between 1971 and 1988. Today, between 5,000 and 6,000 Masurians still live in the area, about 50 percent of them members of the German minority in Poland; the remaining half is ethnic Polish. As the Polish journalist Andrzej K. Wróblewski stated, the Polish post-war policy succeeded in what the Prussian state never managed: the creation of a German national consciousness among the Masurians.

Most of the originally Protestant churches in Masuria are now used by the Polish Roman Catholic Church as the number of Lutherans in Masuria declined from 68,500 in 1950 to 21,174 in 1961 and further to 3,536 in 1981. Sometimes, like on 23 September 1979 in the village of Spychowo, the Lutheran Parish was even forcefully driven out of their church while liturgy was held.

=== Modern Masuria ===
In most of modern Masuria, the native population has virtually disappeared. Masuria was incorporated into the voivodeship system of administration in 1945. In 1999, Masuria was constituted with neighbouring Warmia as a single administrative province through the creation of the Warmian-Masurian Voivodeship. Sociological studies show that the post-1945 population of Masuria has had difficulty developing a shared regional identity.

Today, numerous summer music festivals take place in Masuria, including the largest reggae festival in Poland in Ostróda, the largest country music festival in Poland in Mrągowo, and one of Poland's largest hip-hop festivals in Giżycko and Ełk.

The Masurian Szczytno-Szymany International Airport gained international attention as press reports alleged the airport to be a so-called "black site" involved in the CIA's network of extraordinary renditions.

== Landscape ==
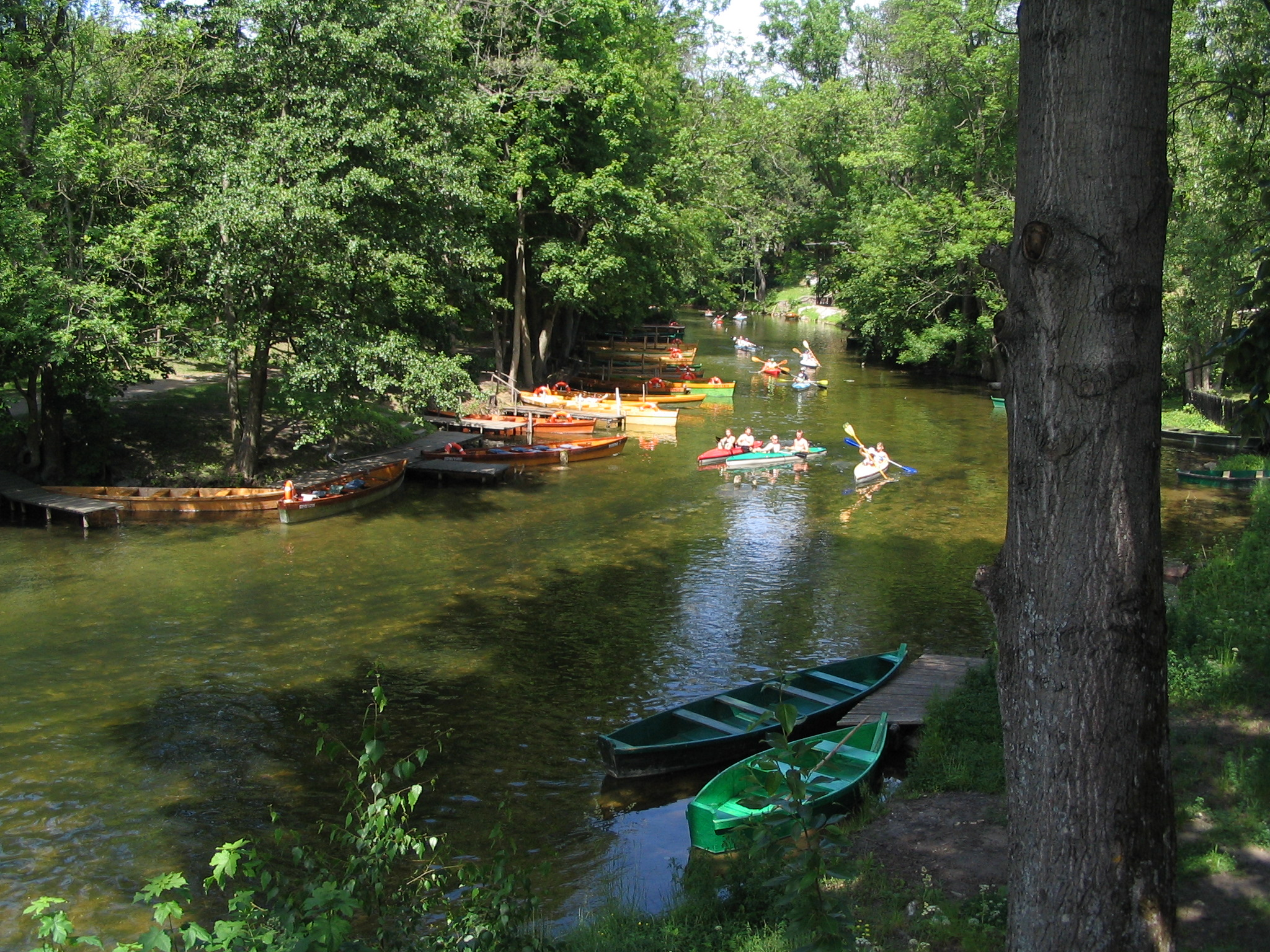
Kayaking on the Krutynia river

Masuria and the Masurian Lake District are known in Polish as Kraina Tysiąca Jezior, meaning "land of a thousand lakes." These lakes were ground out of the land by glaciers during the Pleistocene ice age around 14,000 - 15,000 years ago, when ice covered northeastern Europe. From that period originates the horn of a reindeer found in the vicinity of Giżycko. By 10,000 BC, this ice started to melt. Great geological changes took place and even in the last 500 years, the maps showing the lagoons and peninsulas on the Baltic Sea have greatly altered in appearance. More than in other parts of northern Poland, such as from Pomerania (from the River Oder to the River Vistula), this continuous stretch of lakes is popular among tourists. The terrain is rather hilly, with connecting lakes, rivers and streams. Forests account for about 30% of the area. The northern part of Masuria is covered mostly by the broadleaved forest, while the southern part is dominated by pine and mixed forests.

The two largest lakes of Poland, Śniardwy and Mamry, are located in Masuria.

== Cities and towns ==
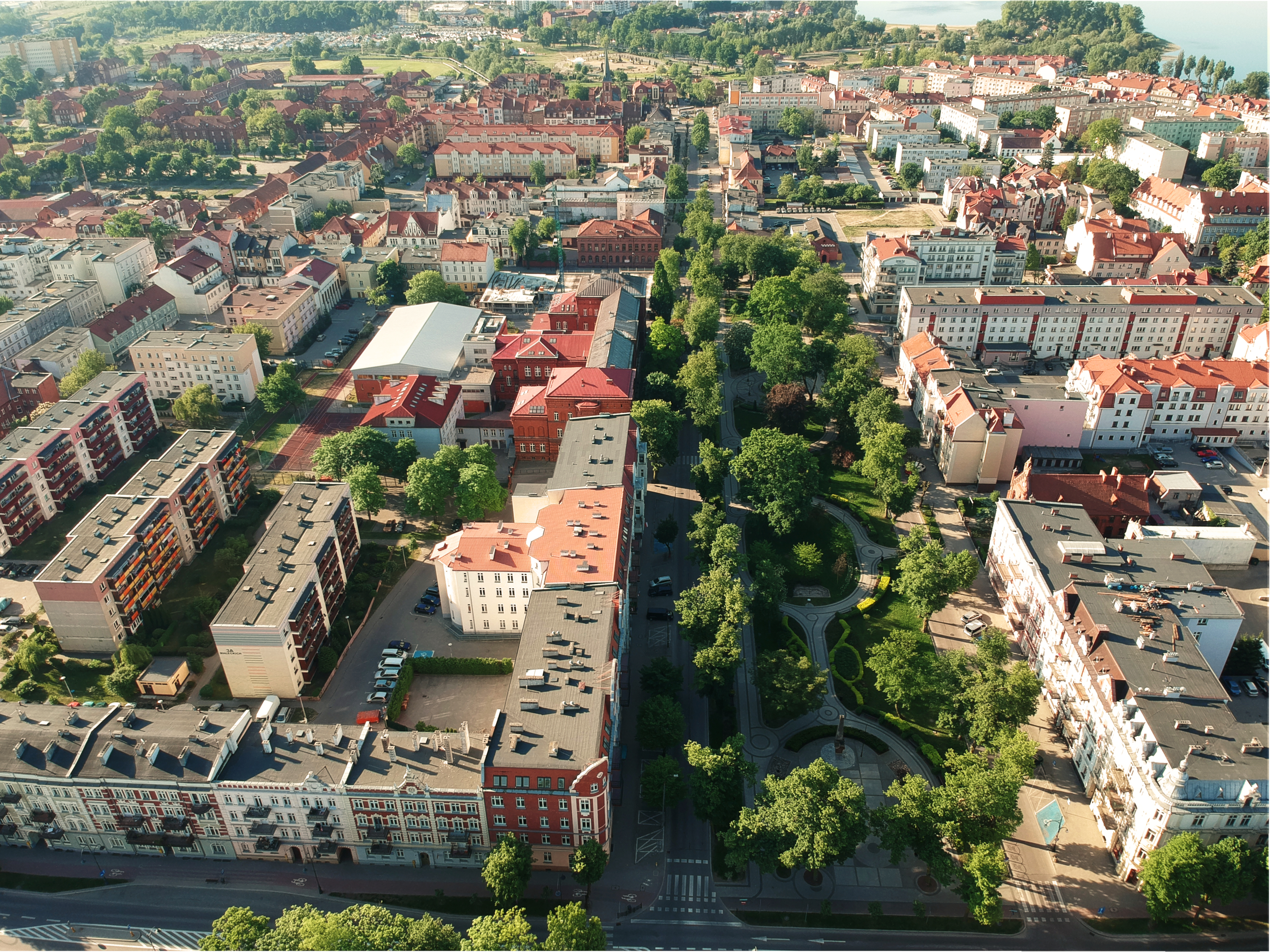
Ełk

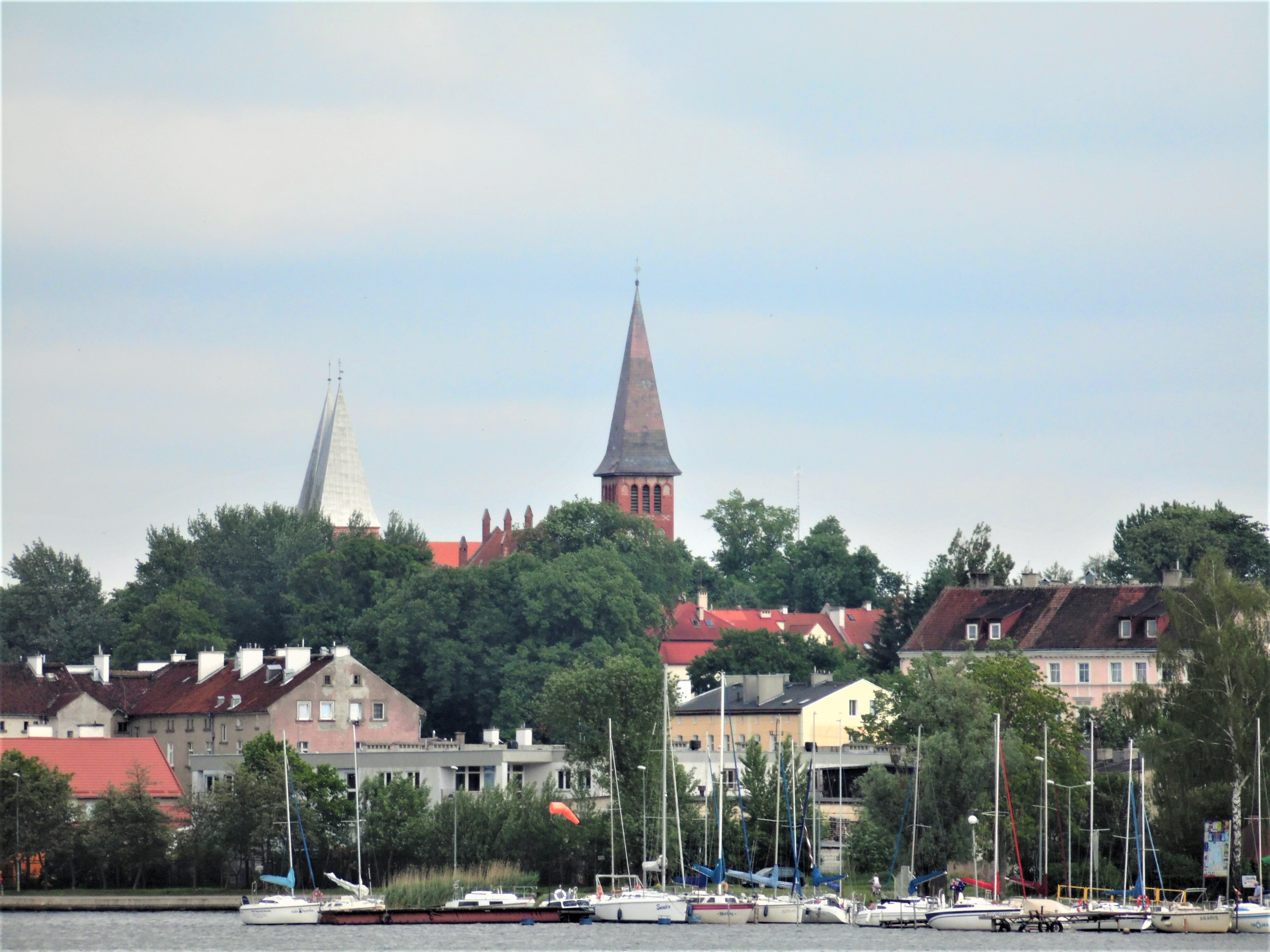
Ostróda

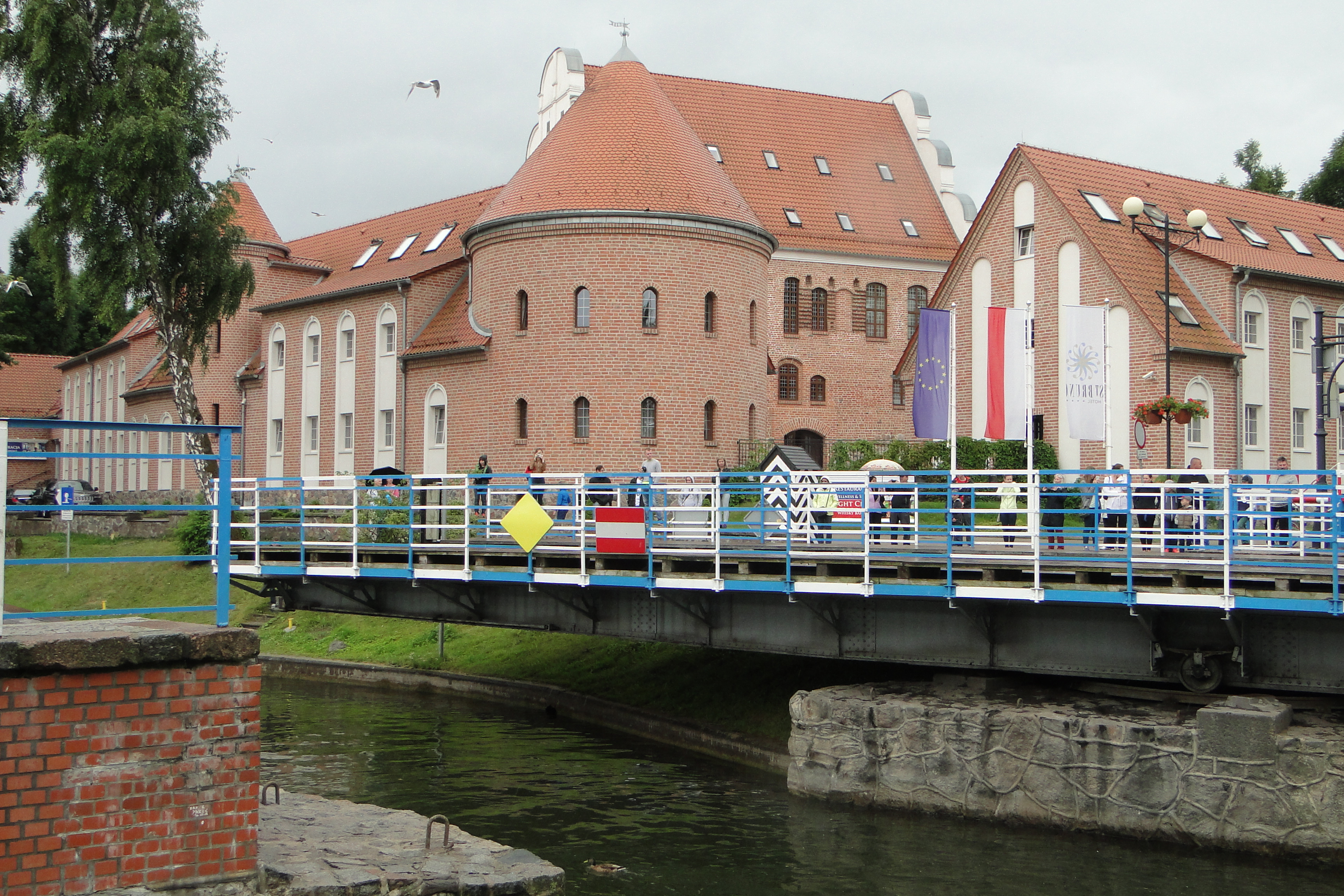
Giżycko

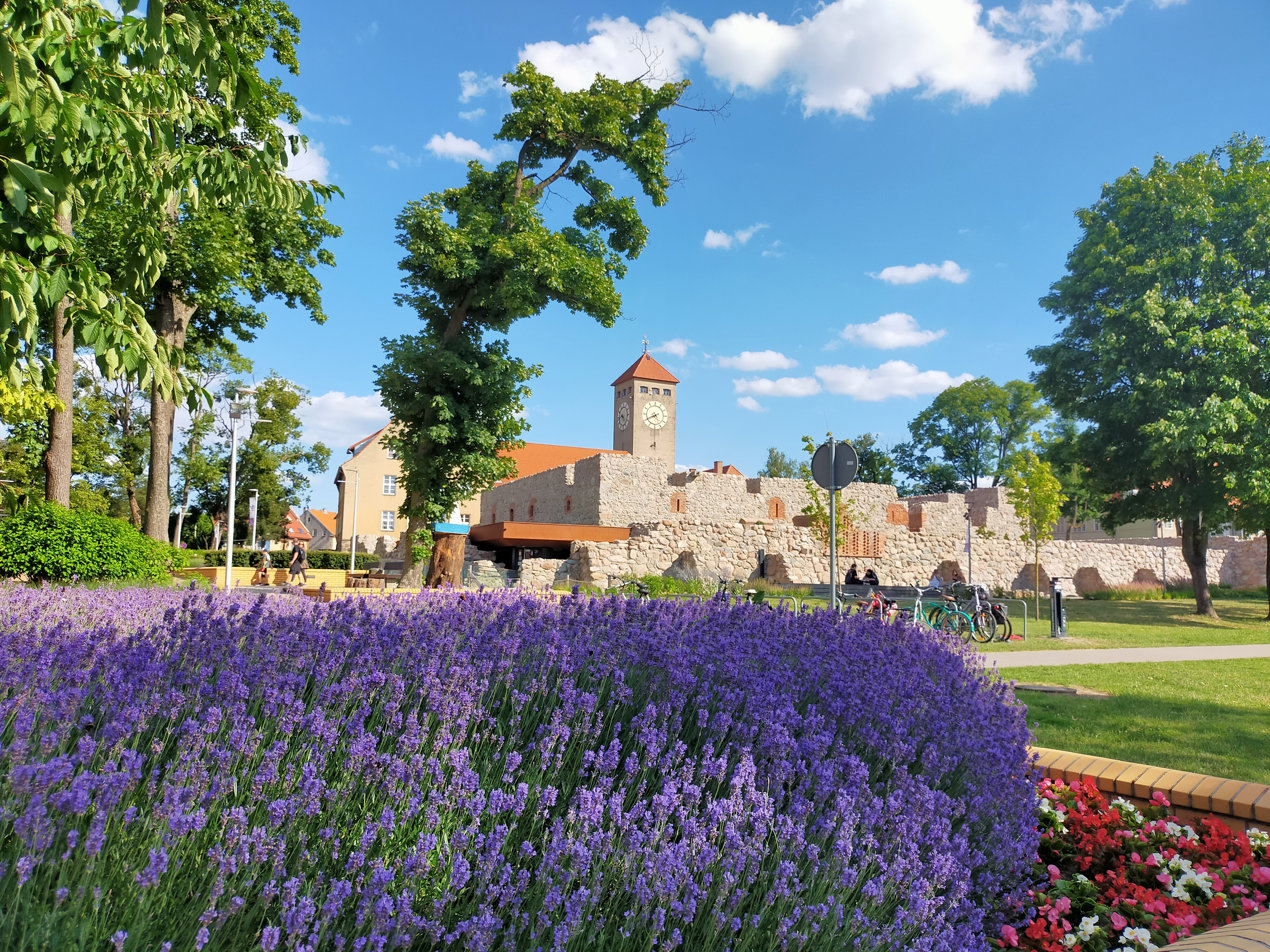
Szczytno

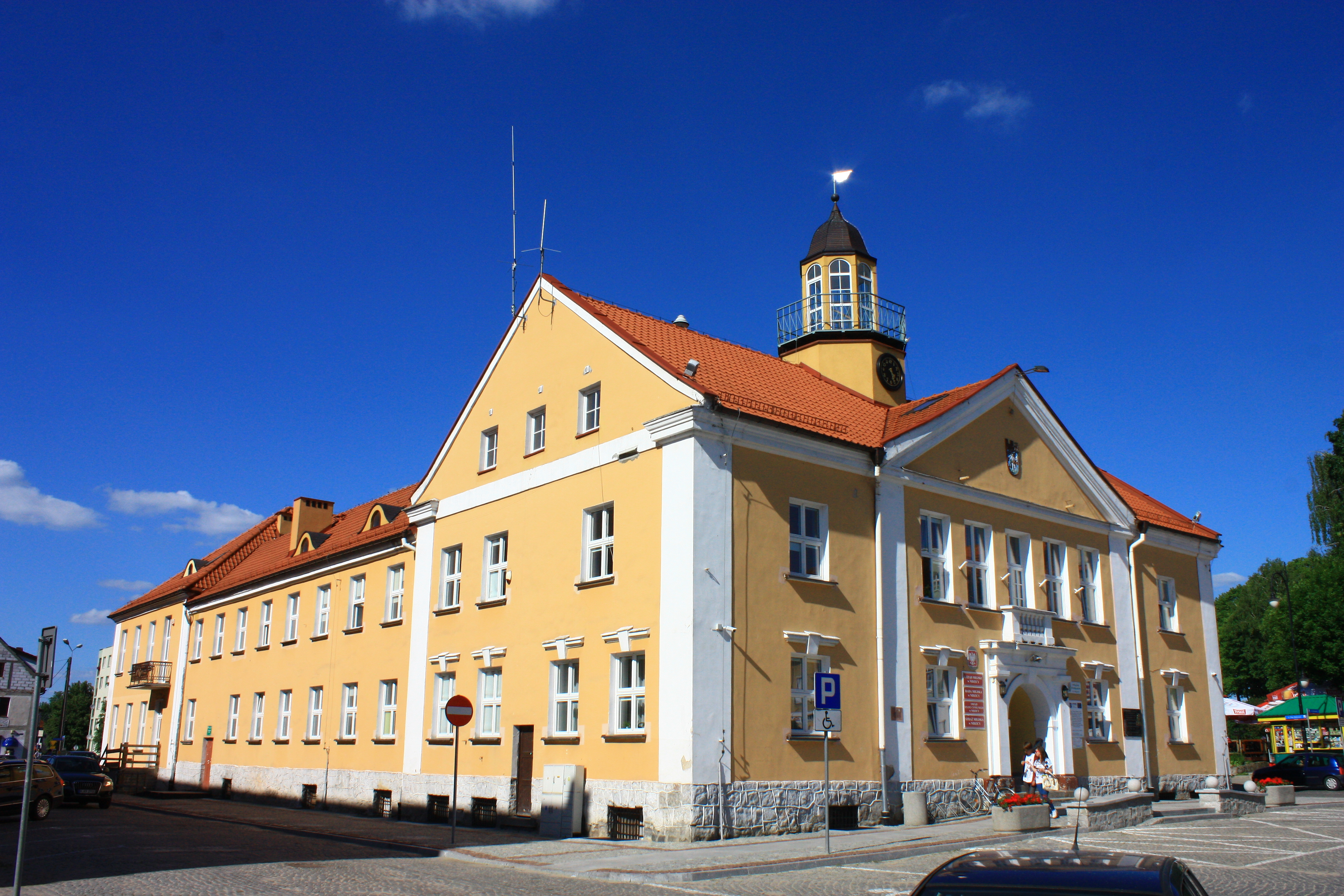
Nidzica

- Biała Piska
- Działdowo
- Ełk
- Giżycko
- Gołdap
- Kętrzyn
- Korsze
- Mikołajki
- Miłomłyn
- Mrągowo
- Nidzica
- Olecko
- Olsztynek
- Orzysz
- Ostróda
- Pasym
- Pisz
- Ruciane-Nida
- Ryn
- Szczytno
- Węgorzewo
- Wielbark

== Notable people from Masuria ==
- Richard Altmann (1852–1900), pathologist and histologist
- Leszek Błażyński (1949–1992), boxer
- Kurt Blumenfeld (1884–1963), politician
- Abraham Calovius (1612–1686), Lutheran theologian
- Roman Czepe (born 1956), politician
- Lucas David (1503–1583), historian
- Ferdinand Gregorovius (1821–1891), historian
- Lothar Gall (1936–2024), historian
- Gustaw Gizewiusz (1810–1848), Protestant pastor, supporter of Polish language teaching and resistance against Germanisation
- Georg Andreas Helwing (1666–1748), botanist
- Paul Hensel (1867–1944), politician
- Andreas Hillgruber (1925–1989), historian
- Wojciech Kętrzyński (1838–1918), activist and historian
- Hans Hellmut Kirst (1914–1989), author
- Georg Klebs (1857–1913), botanist
- Walter Kollo (1878–1940), composer
- Horst Kopkow (1910–1996), spy
- Udo Lattek (1935–2015), football coach
- Siegfried Lenz (1926–2014), author
- Wolf Lepenies (born 1941), political scientist
- Johannes von Leysen (1310–1388), founder and first mayor of Allenstein
- Albert Lieven (1906–1971), actor
- Krzysztof Celestyn Mrongovius (1764–1855), Protestant pastor and philosopher
- Celestyn Myślenta (1588–1653), Lutheran theologian and rector of the University of Königsberg
- Rodolphe Radau (1835–1911), astronomer
- Karl Bogislaus Reichert (1811–1883), anatomist
- Nicholas von Renys (1360–1411), knight
- Fritz Richard Schaudinn (1871–1906), zoologist
- Paweł Sobolewski (born 1979), footballer
- Helmuth Stieff (1901–1944), general
- Bethel Henry Strousberg (1823–1884), industrialist
- Arno Surminski (born 1934), writer
- Kurt Symanzik (1923–1983), physicist
- August Trunz (1875–1963), founder of the Prussica-Sammlung Trunz
- Ernst Wiechert (1887–1950), poet and writer
- Wilhelm Wien (1864–1928), physicist, Nobel Prize winner

== See also ==
- Masurians
- Masurian dialects
- Śniardwy Lake
- Dylewska Góra

== Bibliography ==
- Lisocka-Jaegermann, Bogumiła (2006). "Post-War Migrations in Poland". In Czerny, Mirosława (ed.). Poland in the geographical centre of Europe. Hauppauge, New York: Nova Science Publishers. ISBN 978-1-59454-603-7.
- Blanke, Richard (1999). "When Germans and Poles Lived Together: From the History of German-Polish Relations". In Bullivant, Keith; Giles, Geoffrey J.; Pape, Walter (eds.). Germany and Eastern Europe: Cultural Identities and Cultural Differences. Yearbook of European Studies. Vol. 13. Amsterdam; Atlanta, GA: Rodopi. ISBN 978-90-420-0688-1.
- (in Polish) Mazury Entry on the region in Polish PWN Encyclopedia.
- Martin, Bernd (1998). Masuren, Mythos und Geschichte (in German). Karlsruhe: Evangelische Akademie Baden. ISBN 3-87210-122-6. Archived from the original on 28 June 2006.
- Kruk, Erwin (2003). Warmia i Mazury (in Polish). Wrocław: Wydawnictwo Dolnośląskie. ISBN 83-7384-028-1.
- Kossert, Andreas (2006). Masuren. Ostpreußens vergessener Süden (in German). Pantheon. ISBN 3-570-55006-0.
- Kossert, Andreas (2005). Ostpreussen, Geschichte und Mythos (in German). Siedler. ISBN 3-88680-808-4.
- Kossert, Andreas (2004). Mazury, Zapomniane południe Prus Wschodnich (in Polish). ISBN 83-7383-067-7.
- Clark, Christopher (2006). Iron Kingdom: The Rise and Downfall of Prussia 1600–1947. Cambridge: Belknap Press of Harvard. pp. 776. ISBN 0-674-02385-4.
