= Prussica-Sammlung Trunz =

The Prussica-Sammlung Trunz (the formal title can be informally translated as the "Prussianica Collection [belonging to or assembled by] Trunz") is a collection of over 40,000 books about former German territories in Eastern and Central Europe, mainly Prussia. It was founded by Dr. August Trunz (1875-1963) from Allenstein, East Prussia.

Among others, the collection features chronicles by Kaspar Schuetz (1592), Caspar Henneberg (1595), Christoph Hartknoch (1684), Lucas David, and the Livonian chronicles of Balthasar Russow (1578).

In 1978, the collection was purchased by the library of the University of Münster.
