= Lucas David =

German historian

Lucas (or Lukas) David (1503 - April 1583) was a historian, who from ca. 1550 on compiled extensive volumes on Prussian history.

== Life ==
David was born in Allenstein (Olsztyn), Royal Prussia, Poland, to Gerhard Dönhoff. He studied at the University of Leipzig, where he also received a Magister degree. Despite having converted to Protestantism, he served as the chancellor of Bishop Tiedemann Giese between 1540 and 1549. After Giese received the Diocese of Warmia, David joined the ducal court of Albert, Duke of Prussia, in Königsberg (Królewiec) (today Kaliningrad) in 1549, taking his oath on 26 March 1550.

Albert commissioned a work on the history of Prussia, mainly to counter the - in his view - biased Polish and Catholic works. However, he was only able to produce a recent history of Prussia before he died. His son, Albert Frederick, however, continued the efforts, and instructed David to compile a history of Prussia. This was also supported by various social classes, which believed that the Polish histories belittled Prussian achievements. Hence David researched documents of Prussian history, and started to write his Prussian Chronicles ("Preußische Chronik") from ca. 1575. While David utilized large parts of the work of Simon Grunau, he also frequently corrected errors by Grunau.

David married a wealthy widow in Leipzig. He instituted scholarships at the University of Leipzig, mainly for poor students from his hometown.

Before David was able to complete his chronicles, he died at Königsberg in 1583 at the age of 80. The chronicle ends with the events preceding the Battle of Grunwald (or Tannenberg) in 1410; other sources state that his works extend till 1475. His works were largely unknown to his contemporaries, and were re-discovered only around 1720, with another 100 years before their first publication in the years between 1812–17 in eight volumes. Since then he has become well known past the borders of his homeland for these Prussian Chronicles. He is ranked as a 'modern' historian, as he based his studies on historical sources.

The Prussica-Sammlung Trunz started by another Allenstein native, Dr. August Trunz (1875-1963), contains works by David. It is housed in the library of the University of Münster.

== Works ==
- Hennig, Ernst (ed): Preussische Chronik. - Königsberg : Haberland, 1.1812 - 6. 1814

== Literature ==
- Udo Arnold: Studien zur preussischen Historiographie des 16. Jahrhunderts. Bonn 1967 (Diss.)
- W. Hubatsch: Lucas David, der Geschichtsschreiber seiner Zeit. In: Erwin Nadolny: Südostpreußen und das Ruhrgebiet. Rautenberg & Möckel, Leer (Ostfriesland) 1954
- A. Mentzel-Reuters: Von der Ordenschronik zur Landesgeschichte. Die Herausbildung der altpreußischen Landeshistoriographie im 16. Jahrhunderts. In: Klaus Garber und Manfred Komorowski (Hrsg.): Kulturgeschichte Ostpreußens in der Frühen Neuzeit (Frühe Neuzeit, Band 56). Tübingen 2001, S. 581–637, ISBN 3-484-36556-0
- E. Maschke, E.: Die ältere Geschichtsschreibung des Preußenlandes. In: Erich Maschke (Einl.), Walther Hubatsch (Hrsg.) und Udo Arnold (Bearb.): Scriptores rerum Prussicarum. Band 6, 1968, S. 1–21
- H. Schmauch: Über die Arbeitsmethoden und Quellen des Lucas David. In: Prussia. Band 29, 1931
- Max Toeppen: Geschichte der Preussischen Historiographie von P. v. Dusburg bis auf K. Schütz, oder: Nachweisung und Kritik der gedruckten und ungedruckten Chroniken zur Geschichte Preußens unter der Herrschaft des deutschen Ordens. Berlin 1853, Nachdruck: Walluf bei Wiesbaden 1973.
- Karl Lohmeyer (1876). "David, Lucas". Allgemeine Deutsche Biographie (in German). Vol. 4. Leipzig: Duncker & Humblot. pp. 785–786.
- Walter Hubatsch (1957). "David, Lucas". Neue Deutsche Biographie (in German). Vol. 3. Berlin: Duncker & Humblot. p. 537.
