= Spaliny =

Spaliny may refer to the following places in Poland:

- Spaliny Małe
- Spaliny Wielkie
