= Kowalik =

Kowalik may refer to:

- Kowalik, Warmian-Masurian Voivodeship, a village in Poland
- Kowalik (surname), a Polish surname
