= Mędrzyny =

- Village
- Location within Poland
- Coordinates: 53°39′12″N 20°40′58″E
- Country: Poland
- Voivodeship: Warmian-Masurian
- County: Olsztyn
- Gmina: Purda
- Population: 0
- Time zone: UTC+1 (CET)
  - Summer (DST): UTC+2 (CEST)

Mędrzyny [mɛnˈdʐɨnɨ] is an abandoned village in the administrative district of Gmina Purda, within Olsztyn County, Warmian-Masurian Voivodeship, in northern Poland. It is located on the western shore of Lake Kośno in the region of Warmia.

In 1863, the village had a population of 25, exclusively Polish by nationality and Catholic by confession.

== Transport ==
The National road 53 runs nearby, north of the village.
