= Kolonia, Szczytno County =

Kolonia
- Village
- Location within Poland
- Coordinates: 53°34′N 21°16′E
- Country: Poland
- Voivodeship: Warmian-Masurian
- County: Szczytno
- Gmina: Świętajno

Kolonia [kɔˈlɔɲa] is a village in the administrative district of Gmina Świętajno, within Szczytno County, Warmian-Masurian Voivodeship, in northern Poland. It is built as a linear settlement.

== History ==
The village has existed since at least 1820. In 1861, it was extended to integrate the village Gorkí, today the southern part of the village. Bogumił Linka, a social activist and pioneer of agricultural education, was born in Gorkí in 1865. In the late nineteenth century, a train station was built. In 1916, a school was added to the village. In the East Prussian plebiscite of 1920, which was largely boycotted by ethnic Poles, the inhabitants voted to remain in Germany.

In 1928, Groß Lontzig (Łąck Wielki) was integrated into Kolonia. After Germany's defeat in World War II, the town became part of Poland.

== Social ==
Stowarzyszenie Wspomagania works with physically and mentally challenged people in Kolonia.

== Tourism ==
Kolonia has a train station on the railway Olsztyn-Ełk. It is a part of the touristic region of Masuria with its many lakes and recreational places. Visitors can visit a remarkable collection of Natural history exhibits from all over the world in the Muzeum Misyjno-Etnograficzne Księży Werbistów. The village has many traditional wood houses in good shape. The foresters lodge "Kolonia – Leśniczówka" is placed in Łąck (today Racibor), 3 km (2 mi) north of Kolonia. From there at the popular lake "Jeziora Świętajno" springs the river stream "Szkwa", which also leads through Kolonia. Half a kilometre from the lodge, there is an old cemetery.
