= Jeruty =

- Village
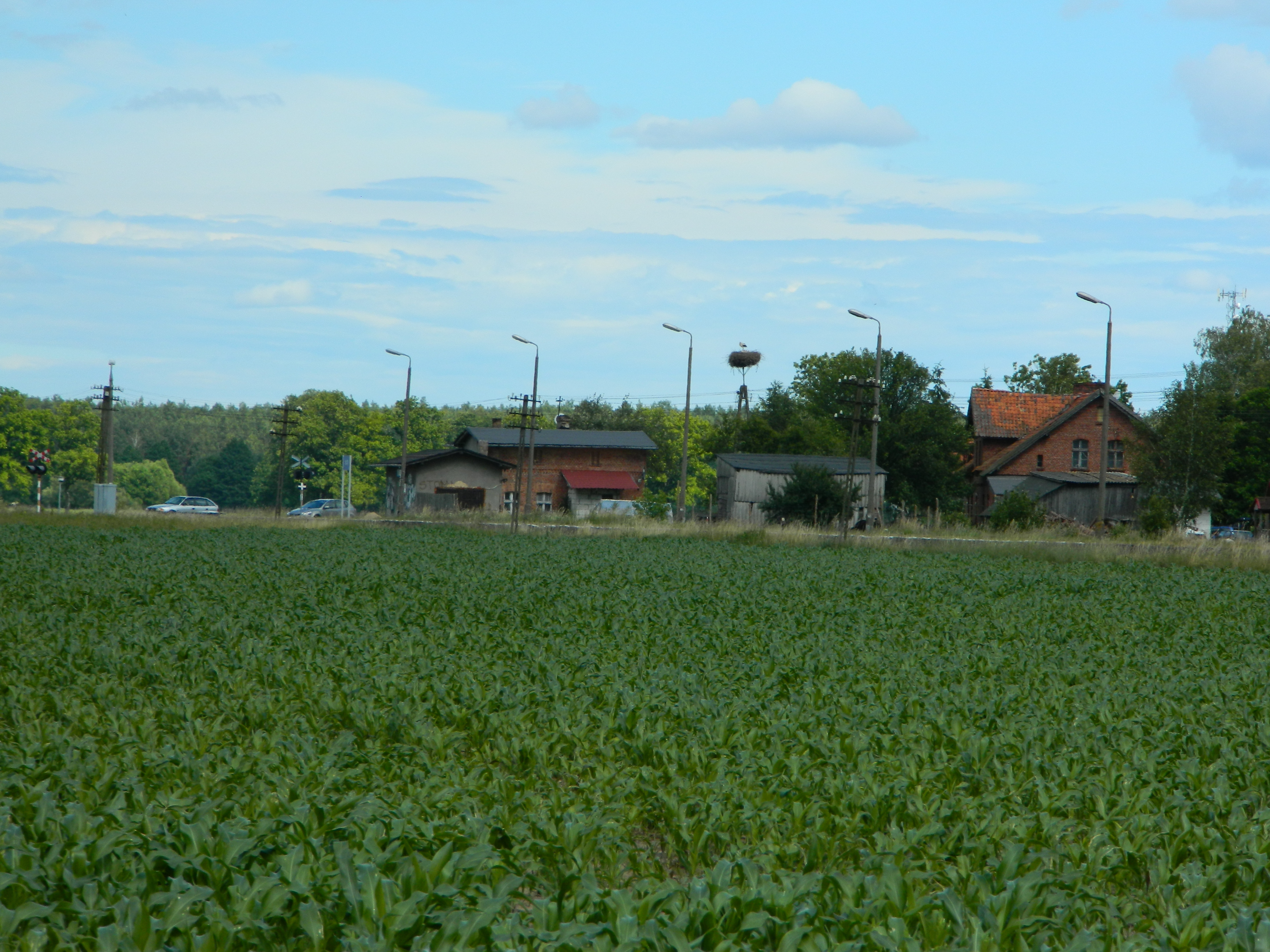

- Location within Poland
- Coordinates: 53°32′N 21°10′E
- Country: Poland
- Voivodeship: Warmian-Masurian
- County: Szczytno
- Gmina: Świętajno
- Time zone: UTC+1 (CET)
  - Summer (DST): UTC+2 (CEST)
- Vehicle registration: NSZ

Jeruty [jɛˈrutɨ] (German: Groß Jerutten) is a village in the administrative district of Gmina Świętajno, within Szczytno County, Warmian-Masurian Voivodeship, in northern Poland.

== History ==
The local Polish secret resistance was active and smuggled weapons through Jeruty to the nearby Russian Partition of Poland during the January Uprising, and sheltered Polish insurgents fleeing the Russian Partition.

== Transport ==
There is a train station in Jeruty, and the National road 53 passes nearby, north of the village.
