= National road 52 (Poland) =

Road in Poland

National Road 52
- Droga krajowa nr 52

Route information
- Maintained by GDDKiA
- Length: 74 km (46 mi)

Major junctions
- From: Bielsko-Biała
- To: Głogoczów

Location
- Country: Poland
- Regions: Masovian Voivodeship; Warmian-Masurian Voivodeship

Highway system
- National roads in Poland; Voivodeship roads
← DK 51	→ DK 53

National road 52 (Polish: Droga krajowa nr 52, abbreviated as DK52) is a route belonging to the Polish national road network. The highway is a GP-class and S-class road, 72 km (45 mi) long and is located in the Lesser Poland and Silesian Voivodeship. This route consists of two fragments that are not connected with each other. The first one connects Cieszyn through Bielsko-Biała with Głogoczów. The second is the north-west bypass of Kraków.

On 4 August 2016, the stretch of the Cieszyn-Bielsko-Biała expressway, previously designated as Expressway S1, became a portion of DK52 (this section has expressway status as Expressway S52).

== Major cities and towns along the route ==
- Cieszyn
- Skoczów
- Bielsko-Biała
- Kobiernice
- Kęty
- Andrychów
- Wadowice
- Kalwaria Zebrzydowska
- Biertowice
- Głogoczów
- Mogilany
- Kraków

== Axle load limit ==
National road 52 has an axle limit restrictions.

The allowed axle limit is up to 11.5 tons, which is a standard limit on Polish national roads.
