= Radostowo =

Radostowo may refer to the following places:

- Radostowo, Pomeranian Voivodeship (north Poland)
- Radostowo, Olsztyn County in Warmian-Masurian Voivodeship (north Poland)
- Radostowo, Szczytno County in Warmian-Masurian Voivodeship (north Poland)
- Radostowo, West Pomeranian Voivodeship (north-west Poland)
