= Gmina Świętajno, Szczytno County =

Gmina Świętajno Świętajno Commune
- Gmina
- Coat of arms
- Interactive map of Gmina Świętajno
- Coordinates (Świętajno): 53°33′52″N 21°13′2″E
- Country: Poland
- Voivodeship: Warmian-Masurian
- County: Szczytno
- Seat: Świętajno

Area
  - Total: 279.78 km^{2} (108.02 sq mi)

Population (2006)
  - Total: 5,879
  - Density: 21.01/km^{2} (54.42/sq mi)
- Website: www.swietajno.ug.gov.pl

Gmina Świętajno is a rural gmina (administrative district) in Szczytno County, Warmian-Masurian Voivodeship, in northern Poland. Its seat is the village of Świętajno, which lies approximately 16 kilometres (10 mi) east of Szczytno and 54 km (34 mi) south-east of the regional capital Olsztyn.

The gmina covers an area of 279.78 square kilometres (108.0 sq mi), and as of 2006 its total population is 5,879.

The gmina contains part of the protected area called Masurian Landscape Park.

== Villages ==
Gmina Świętajno contains the villages and settlements of Biały Grunt, Brzózki, Bystrz, Chajdyce, Chochół, Cis, Długi Borek, Jerominy, Jerutki, Jeruty, Kierwik, Koczek, Kolonia, Konrady, Łąck Mały, Łąck Wielki, Myszadło, Niedźwiedzica, Nowe Czajki, Piasutno, Połom, Powałczyn, Racibórz, Spychówko, Spychowo, Spychowski Piec, Stare Czajki, Świętajno, Szklarnia and Zielone.

== Neighbouring gminas ==
Gmina Świętajno is bordered by the gminas of Dźwierzuty, Piecki, Rozogi, Ruciane-Nida and Szczytno.
