= Nowe Czajki =

- Village
- Interactive map of Nowe Czajki
- Location within Poland
- Coordinates: 53°32′N 21°15′E
- Country: Poland
- Voivodeship: Warmian-Masurian
- County: Szczytno
- Gmina: Świętajno

Nowe Czajki [ˈnɔvɛ ˈt͡ʂai̯ki] (German: Neu Kiwitten) is a village in the administrative district of Gmina Świętajno, within Szczytno County, Warmian-Masurian Voivodeship, in northern Poland.
