= Świętajno, Szczytno County =

Świętajno
- Village
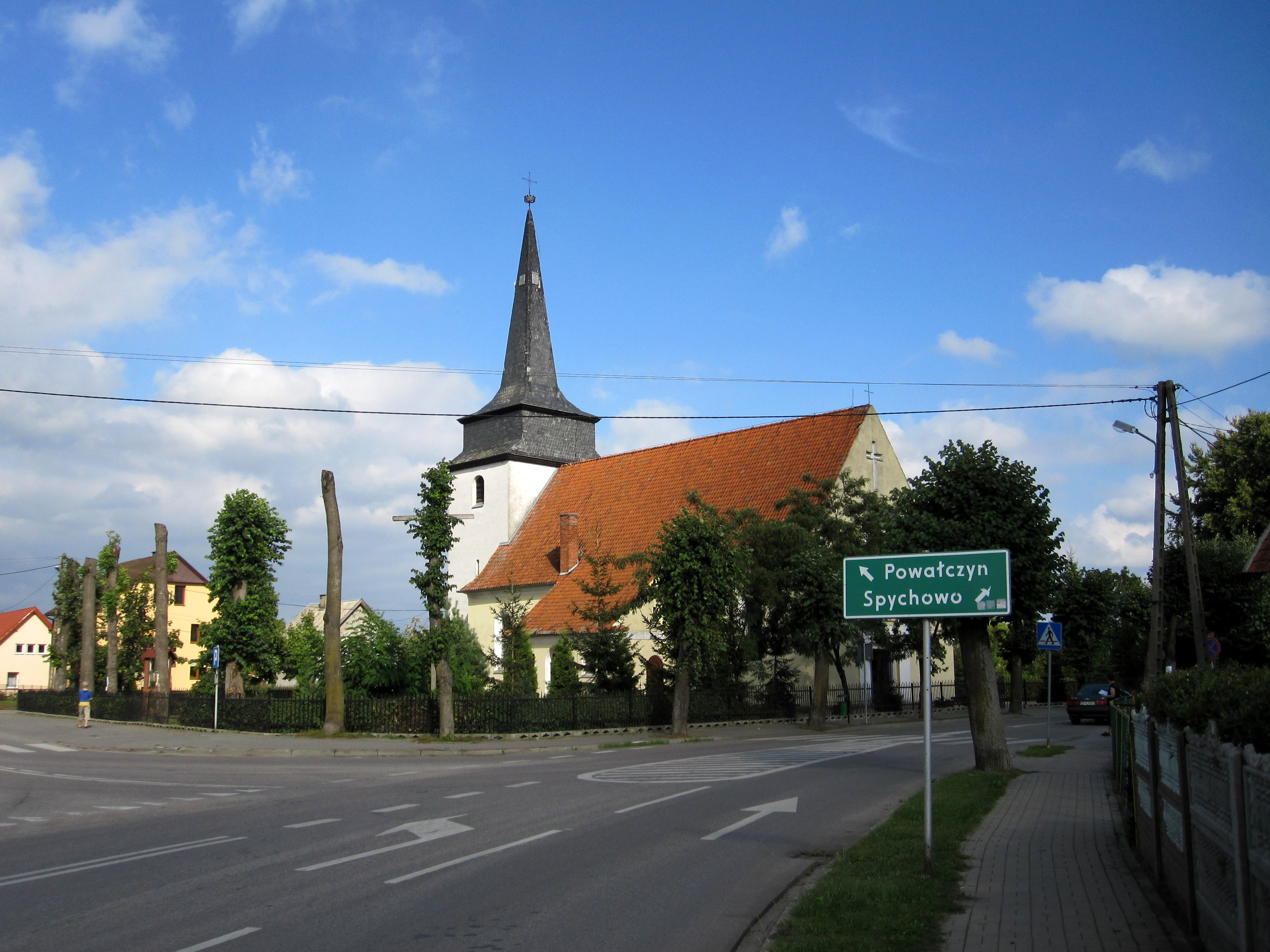
- Church of Saint Andrew Bobola

- Location within Poland
- Coordinates: 53°33′52″N 21°13′2″E
- Country: Poland
- Voivodeship: Warmian-Masurian
- County: Szczytno
- Gmina: Świętajno

Population
  - Total: 2,000
- Website: http://swietajno-ug.wwm.pl/

Świętajno (Polish pronunciation: [ɕfjɛnˈtajnɔ]; German: Schwentainen) is a village in Szczytno County, Warmian-Masurian Voivodeship, in northeastern Poland. It is the seat of the gmina (administrative district) called Gmina Świętajno.

The village has a population of 2,000.
