= National road 53 (Poland) =

Road in Poland

National Road 53
- Droga krajowa nr 53

Route information
- Maintained by GDDKiA
- Length: 123 km (76 mi)

Major junctions
- From: Olsztyn
- To: Ostrołęka

Location
- Country: Poland
- Regions: Masovian Voivodeship; Warmian-Masurian Voivodeship

Highway system
- National roads in Poland; Voivodeship roads
← DK 52	→ DK 54

National road 53 (Polish: Droga krajowa nr 53) is a route belonging to the Polish national road network. The highway is a GP-class and G-class road, 123 km (76 mi) long and is located in the Masovian and Warmian-Masurian Voivodeship. This route connects Olsztyn with Ostrołęka. The winding section between Olsztyn and Szczytno is the most difficult for drivers.

== Route description ==
National road 53 has GP-class parameters on the Olsztyn - Szczytno - Rozogi section, and G-class parameters on the Rozogi - Myszyniec - Ostrołęka section.

== History ==
National road 53 received its current number on 14 February 1986. The earlier designation is unknown; on the then maps and road atlases, the artery was marked as the so-called a secondary road, without giving its number.

== Major cities and towns along the route ==
- Olsztyn (national road 16, national road 51)
- Klewki
- Pasym
- Szczytno (national road 57, national road 58)
- Rozogi (national road 59)
- Dąbrowy
- Myszyniec
- Wydmusy
- Kadzidło
- Dylewo
- Ostrołęka (national road 61)

== Axle load limit ==
National road 53 has an axle limit restrictions.

The allowed axle limit is up to 11.5 tons, which is a standard limit on Polish national roads.
