= Konrady =

- Village
- Location within Poland
- Coordinates: 53°30′N 21°13′E
- Country: Poland
- Voivodeship: Warmian-Masurian
- County: Szczytno
- Gmina: Świętajno
- Population: 48

Konrady [kɔnˈradɨ] (German: Konraden) is a village in the administrative district of Gmina Świętajno, within Szczytno County, Warmian-Masurian Voivodeship, in northern Poland.

The village has a population of 48.
