= Andrychów Synagogue =

Destroyed synagogue in Andrychów, Poland

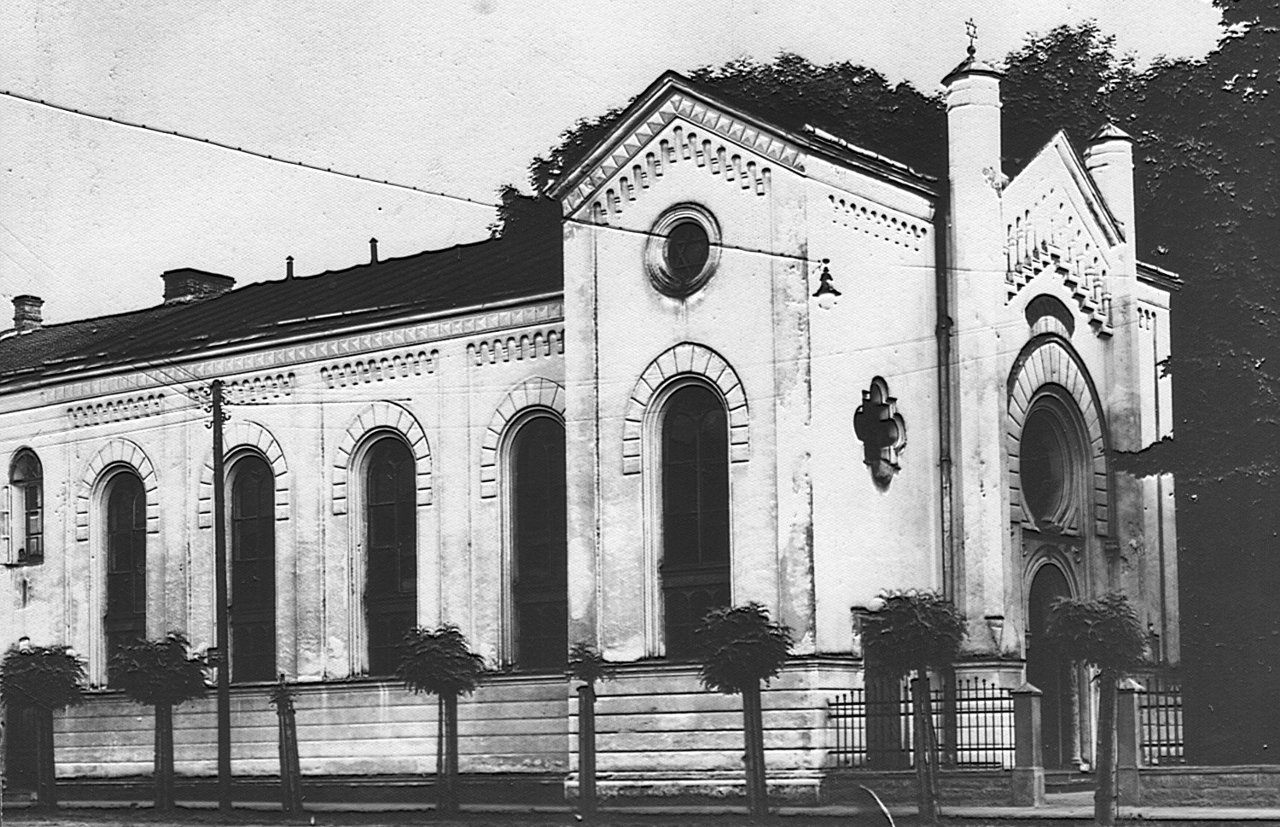

- Location of the destroyed synagogue in Lesser Poland Voivodeship

Religion
- Affiliation: Reform Judaism
- Ecclesiastical or organizational status: Synagogue
- Status: Destroyed

Location
- Location: 15 Legionów Street, Andrychów
- Country: Poland
- Interactive map of Andrychów Synagogue
- Coordinates: 49°51′14″N 19°20′20″E

Architecture
- Architect: Carl Korn
- Type: Synagogue architecture
- Completed: 1885
- Destroyed: 24 November 1939
- Materials: Brick

The Andrychów Synagogue (Polish: Synagoga w Andrychowie) was a Reform Jewish congregation and synagogue located at 15 Legionów Street in Andrychów, Poland. Constructed in 1885, the synagogue served as a house of prayer until World War II, when it was destroyed by the Nazis in 1939.

== History ==
Jews were allowed to settle in Andrychów in accordance with the 1767 charter issued by King Stanisław August Poniatowski. The first synagogue in Andrychów was built from wood in the 18th century in the town's centre, by Grunwaldzka Street (currently Legionów Street). The town (then in Austria-Hungary) saw an influx of Jewish settlers in the mid-1800s, as a result of the Industrial Revolution. They soon formed a religious association.

In 1885, the wooden synagogue was demolished, and a new one, made of brick, was constructed in its place. Most of the construction costs were covered by a local businessman, Maurycy Unger. The new synagogue looked similar to the ones in nearby Wadowice and Biała. The main hall could seat six hundred people. The building was designed by architect Carl Korn of Bielsko, based on German Reform synagogues. Since 1925, the rabbi of Andrychów was Dawid Awigdor, a member of the Mizrachi organization. During his incumbency, the synagogue was renovated in 1930, with financial help from Bernard Stamberg, a local textile factory owner.

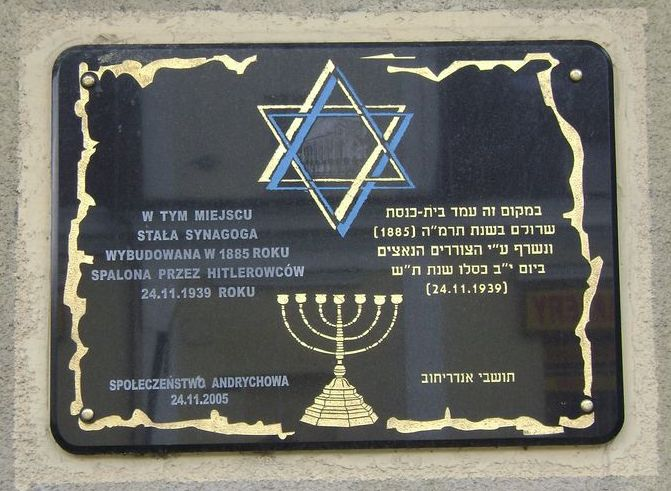
Memorial plaque

Following the Invasion of Poland and the start of the Second World War, on 24 November 1939, German Nazis burnt down the synagogue. Its remains were dismantled by local Jews in March 1940. A collection of Judaist books and documents was also destroyed.

On 24 November 2005, 65 years after the burning of the synagogue, it was commemorated by a memorial plaque with inscriptions in Polish and Hebrew.

== See also ==
- History of the Jews in Poland
- List of active synagogues in Poland

== Bibliography ==
- Podyma, Agnieszka (2001). "Synagogi postępowe w Białej, Wadowicach i Andrychowie" (PDF). Wadoviana. Przegląd historyczno-kulturalny. 6: 34–44. ISSN 1505-0181.
