= Księży Lasek =

- Village
- Location within Poland
- Coordinates: 53°24′N 21°11′E
- Country: Poland
- Voivodeship: Warmian-Masurian
- County: Szczytno
- Gmina: Rozogi

Księży Lasek [ˈkɕɛ̃ʐɨ ˈlasɛk] (German: Fürstenwalde) is a village in the administrative district of Gmina Rozogi, within Szczytno County, Warmian-Masurian Voivodeship, in northern Poland.
