= Zielone, Warmian-Masurian Voivodeship =

Zielone
- Village
- Location within Poland
- Coordinates: 53°31′N 21°14′E
- Country: Poland
- Voivodeship: Warmian-Masurian
- County: Szczytno
- Gmina: Świętajno

Zielone [ʑɛˈlɔnɛ] is a village in the administrative district of Gmina Świętajno, within Szczytno County, Warmian-Masurian Voivodeship, in northern Poland.
