= Długi Borek =

- Village
- Location within Poland
- Coordinates: 53°32′N 21°18′E
- Country: Poland
- Voivodeship: Warmian-Masurian
- County: Szczytno
- Gmina: Świętajno

Długi Borek [ˈdwuɡi ˈbɔrɛk] (German: Langenwalde) is a village in the administrative district of Gmina Świętajno, within Szczytno County, Warmian-Masurian Voivodeship, in northern Poland.
