= Chochół, Warmian-Masurian Voivodeship =

Chochół
- Village
- Location within Poland
- Coordinates: 53°32′40″N 21°11′23″E
- Country: Poland
- Voivodeship: Warmian-Masurian
- County: Szczytno
- Gmina: Świętajno

Chochół (Polish: [ˈxɔxuw]; German: Friedrichsfelde) is a village in the administrative district of Gmina Świętajno, within Szczytno County, Warmian-Masurian Voivodeship, in northern Poland.
