= Faryny =

- Village
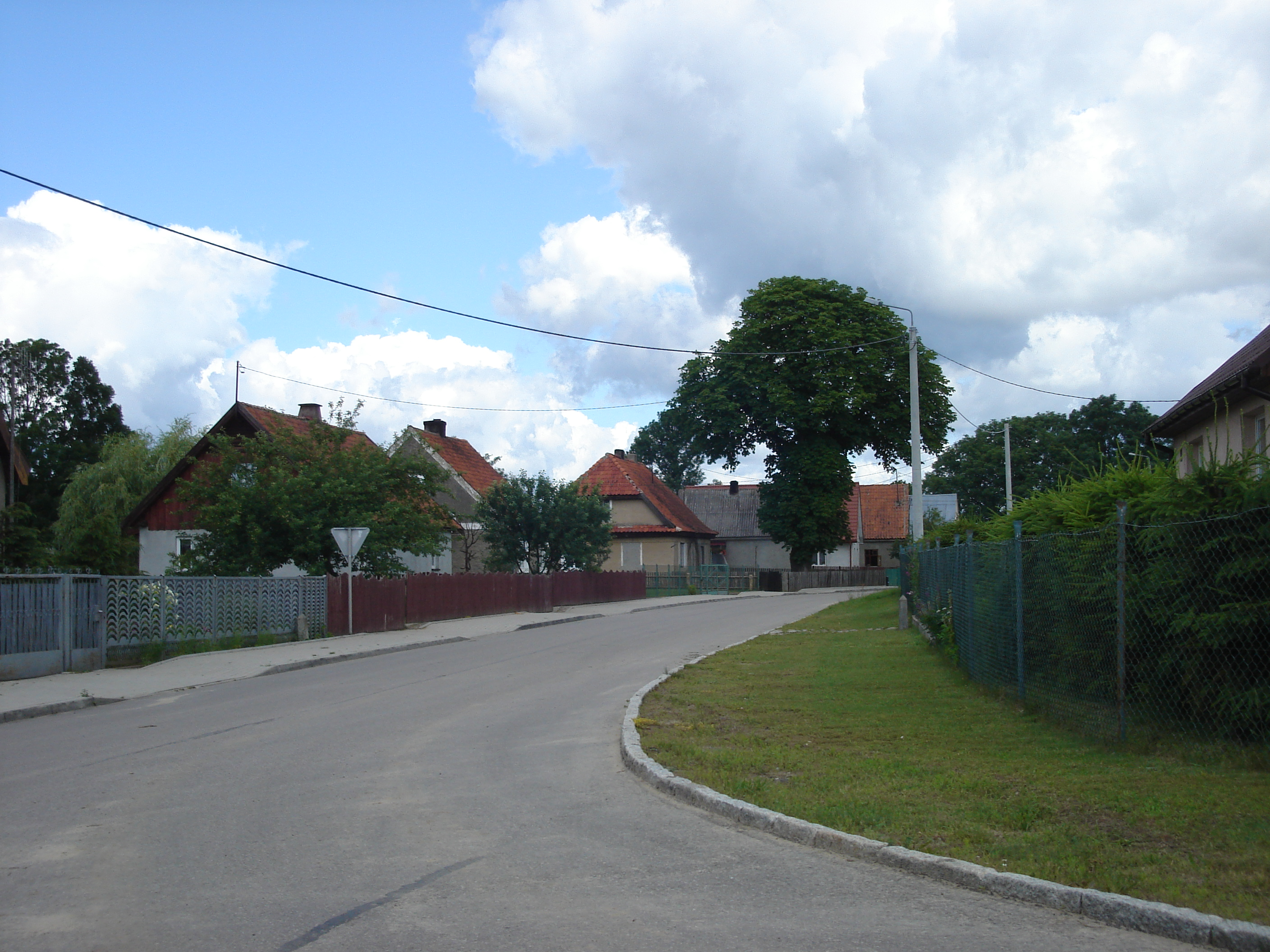

- Location within Poland
- Coordinates: 53°31′N 21°23′E
- Country: Poland
- Voivodeship: Warmian-Masurian
- County: Szczytno
- Gmina: Rozogi
- Population: 383
- Website: http://www.faryny.eu

Faryny [faˈrɨnɨ] (German: Farienen) is a village in the administrative district of Gmina Rozogi, within Szczytno County, Warmian-Masurian Voivodeship, in northern Poland.

The village has a population of 383.
