= Nowy Suchoros =

- Village
- Location within Poland
- Coordinates: 53°28′5″N 21°14′7″E
- Country: Poland
- Voivodeship: Warmian-Masurian
- County: Szczytno
- Gmina: Rozogi

Nowy Suchoros [ˈnɔvɨ suˈxɔrɔs] (German: Neu Suchoroß, 1938-45: Auerswalde) is a village in the administrative district of Gmina Rozogi, within Szczytno County, Warmian-Masurian Voivodeship, in northern Poland.
