= Szklarnia, Szczytno County =

Szklarnia
- Settlement
- Location within Poland
- Coordinates: 53°35′N 21°23′E
- Country: Poland
- Voivodeship: Warmian-Masurian
- County: Szczytno
- Gmina: Świętajno

Szklarnia [ˈʂklarɲa] (German: Adamsverdruß) is a settlement in the administrative district of Gmina Świętajno, within Szczytno County, Warmian-Masurian Voivodeship, in northern Poland.
