= Piasutno =

- Village
- Location within Poland
- Coordinates: 53°36′N 21°13′E
- Country: Poland
- Voivodeship: Warmian-Masurian
- County: Szczytno
- Gmina: Świętajno

Piasutno [pjaˈsutnɔ] (German: Piassutten) is a village in the administrative district of Gmina Świętajno, within Szczytno County, Warmian-Masurian Voivodeship, in northern Poland.
