= Kwiatuszki Wielkie =

- Village
- Location within Poland
- Coordinates: 53°29′26″N 21°24′56″E
- Country: Poland
- Voivodeship: Warmian-Masurian
- County: Szczytno
- Gmina: Rozogi

Kwiatuszki Wielkie [kfjaˈtuʂki ˈvjɛlkʲɛ] (German: Groß Blumenau) is a village in the administrative district of Gmina Rozogi, within Szczytno County, Warmian-Masurian Voivodeship, in northern Poland.
