= Klon, Szczytno County =

Klon
- Village
- Location within Poland
- Coordinates: 53°27′N 21°16′E
- Country: Poland
- Voivodeship: Warmian-Masurian
- County: Szczytno
- Gmina: Rozogi
- Population: 480

Klon [klɔn] is a village in the administrative district of Gmina Rozogi, within Szczytno County, Warmian-Masurian Voivodeship, in northern Poland.

The village has a population of 480.
