= Spychowski Piec =

- Settlement
- Location within Poland
- Coordinates: 53°37′24″N 21°19′03″E
- Country: Poland
- Voivodeship: Warmian-Masurian
- County: Szczytno
- Gmina: Świętajno
- Time zone: UTC+01:00 (CET)
  - Summer (DST): UTC+02:00 (CEST)

Spychowski Piec [spɨˈxɔfski ˈpjɛt͡s] is a settlement in the administrative district of Gmina Świętajno, within Szczytno County, Warmian-Masurian Voivodeship, in northern Poland.
