= Biały Grunt =

- Village
- Location within Poland
- Coordinates: 53°30′N 21°12′E
- Country: Poland
- Voivodeship: Warmian-Masurian
- County: Szczytno
- Gmina: Świętajno
- Population: 15

Biały Grunt [ˈbjawɨ ˈɡrunt] (German: Bialygrund) is a village in the administrative district of Gmina Świętajno, within Szczytno County, Warmian-Masurian Voivodeship, in northern Poland.

The village has a population of 15.
