= Stare Czajki =

- Village
- Location within Poland
- Coordinates: 53°31′N 21°16′E
- Country: Poland
- Voivodeship: Warmian-Masurian
- County: Szczytno
- Gmina: Świętajno

Stare Czajki [ˈstarɛ ˈt͡ʂai̯ki] is a village in the administrative district of Gmina Świętajno, within Szczytno County, Warmian-Masurian Voivodeship, in northern Poland.
