= Orzeszki =

- Village
- Location within Poland
- Coordinates: 53°28′N 21°14′E
- Country: Poland
- Voivodeship: Warmian-Masurian
- County: Szczytno
- Gmina: Rozogi

Orzeszki [ɔˈʐɛʂki] (German: Zielonygrund, 1938-45:Schützengrund) is a village in the administrative district of Gmina Rozogi, within Szczytno County, Warmian-Masurian Voivodeship, in northern Poland.
