= Powałczyn =

- Village
- Location within Poland
- Coordinates: 53°39′N 21°11′E
- Country: Poland
- Voivodeship: Warmian-Masurian
- County: Szczytno
- Gmina: Świętajno
- Website: http://www.powalczyn.tnb.pl

Powałczyn [pɔˈvau̯t͡ʂɨn] (German: Powalczin, in 1938 germanized to Schönhöhe) is a village in the administrative district of Gmina Świętajno, within Szczytno County, Warmian-Masurian Voivodeship, in northern Poland.
