= Wilamowo, Szczytno County =

Wilamowo
- Village
- Location within Poland
- Coordinates: 53°28′52″N 21°19′50″E
- Country: Poland
- Voivodeship: Warmian-Masurian
- County: Szczytno
- Gmina: Rozogi

Wilamowo [vilaˈmɔvɔ] (German: Wilhelmshof) is a village in the administrative district of Gmina Rozogi, within Szczytno County, Warmian-Masurian Voivodeship, in northern Poland.
