= Lipniak, Warmian-Masurian Voivodeship =

Lipniak
- Village
- Location within Poland
- Coordinates: 53°30′28″N 21°22′41″E
- Country: Poland
- Voivodeship: Warmian-Masurian
- County: Szczytno
- Gmina: Rozogi

Lipniak [ˈlipɲak] (German: Lipniak) is a village in the administrative district of Gmina Rozogi, within Szczytno County, Warmian-Masurian Voivodeship, in northern Poland.
