= Gmina Rozogi =

Gmina Rozogi Rozogi Commune
- Gmina
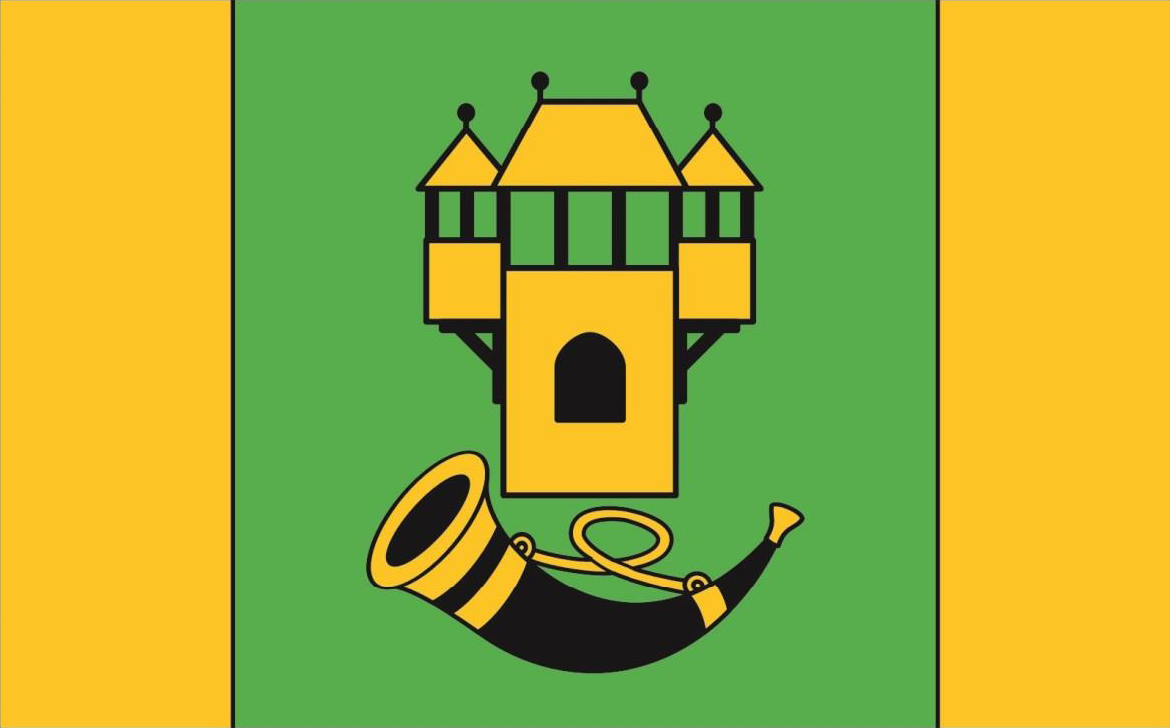
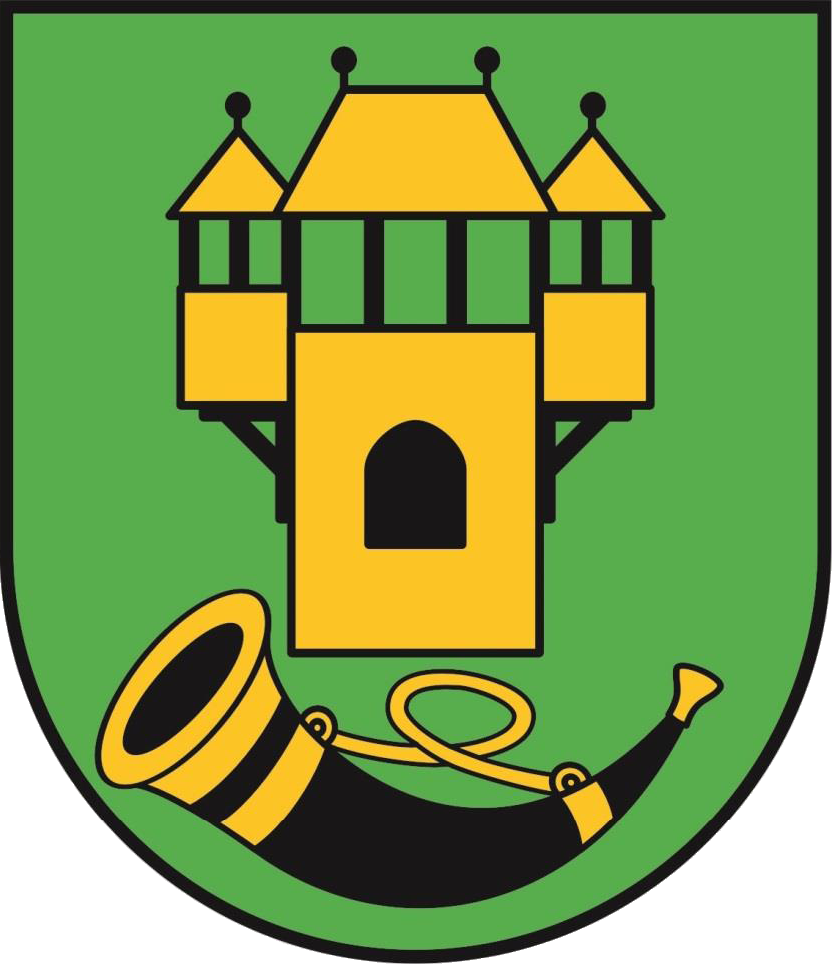
- Flag Coat of arms
- Interactive map of Gmina Rozogi
- Coordinates (Rozogi): 53°29′N 21°21′E
- Country: Poland
- Voivodeship: Warmian-Masurian
- County: Szczytno
- Seat: Rozogi

Area
  - Total: 223.95 km^{2} (86.47 sq mi)

Population (2006)
  - Total: 5,643
  - Density: 25.20/km^{2} (65.26/sq mi)
- Website: https://rozogi.pl/

Gmina Rozogi is a rural gmina (administrative district) in Szczytno County, Warmian-Masurian Voivodeship, in northern Poland. Its seat is the village of Rozogi, which lies approximately 26 kilometres (16 mi) east of Szczytno and 58 km (36 mi) east of the regional capital Olsztyn.

The gmina covers an area of 223.95 square kilometres (86.5 sq mi), and as of 2006 its total population is 5,643.

== Villages ==
Gmina Rozogi contains the villages and settlements of Antonia, Borki Rozowskie, Dąbrowy, Faryny, Kiełbasy, Kilimany, Klon, Kokoszki, Kowalik, Księży Lasek, Kwiatuszki Wielkie, Lipniak, Łuka, Nowy Suchoros, Orzeszki, Radostowo, Rozogi, Spaliny Małe, Spaliny Wielkie, Wilamowo, Wujaki, Wysoki Grąd, Występ and Zawojki.

== Neighbouring gminas ==
Gmina Rozogi is bordered by the gminas of Czarnia, Łyse, Myszyniec, Pisz, Ruciane-Nida, Świętajno, Szczytno and Wielbark.
