= Wujaki =

- Village
- Location within Poland
- Coordinates: 53°26′N 21°17′E
- Country: Poland
- Voivodeship: Warmian-Masurian
- County: Szczytno
- Gmina: Rozogi
- Time zone: UTC+1 (CET)
  - Summer (DST): UTC+2 (CEST)
- Vehicle registration: NSZ

Wujaki [vuˈjaki] is a village in the administrative district of Gmina Rozogi, within Szczytno County, Warmian-Masurian Voivodeship, in northern Poland.

== History ==
The local Polish secret resistance was active and smuggled weapons through Wujaki to the nearby Russian Partition of Poland during the January Uprising, and sheltered Polish insurgents fleeing the Russian Partition.
