= Chajdyce =

- Settlement
- Location within Poland
- Coordinates: 53°33′40″N 21°10′14″E
- Country: Poland
- Voivodeship: Warmian-Masurian
- County: Szczytno
- Gmina: Świętajno

Chajdyce [xai̯ˈdɨt͡sɛ] is a settlement in the administrative district of Gmina Świętajno, within Szczytno County, Warmian-Masurian Voivodeship, in northern Poland.
