= Andrychów =

- Town
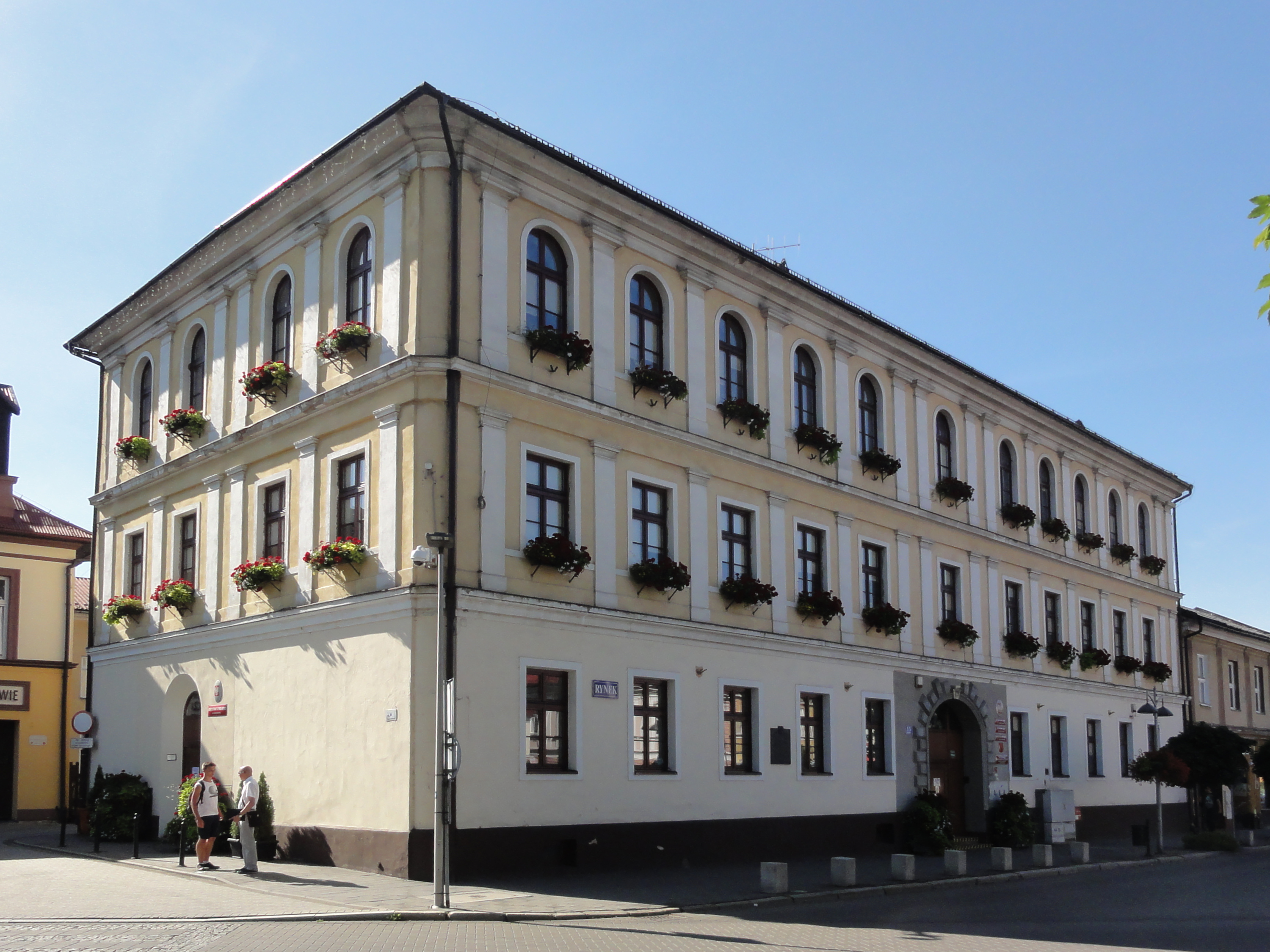
- Town Hall

- Flag Coat of arms

- Location within Poland
- Coordinates: 49°51′18″N 19°20′29″E
- Country: Poland
- Voivodeship: Lesser Poland
- County: Wadowice
- Gmina: Andrychów
- Established: 13th century
- Town rights: 1767

Government
  - Mayor: Beata Smolec (Ind.)

Area
  - Total: 10.34 km^{2} (3.99 sq mi)
- Elevation: 333 m (1,093 ft)

Population (30 June 2022)
  - Total: 18,815
  - Density: 1,820/km^{2} (4,700/sq mi)
- Time zone: UTC+1 (CET)
  - Summer (DST): UTC+2 (CEST)
- Postal code: 34-120
- Area code: +48 33
- Number plates: KWA
- Website: http://andrychow.eu/

Andrychów [anˈdrɨxuf] (Latin: Andrichovia) is the largest town in Wadowice County, Lesser Poland Voivodeship, in southern Poland. The town is located in the Little Beskids, in the historical region of Lesser Poland, on the river Wieprzówka. Andrychów has an area of 10.34 square kilometres (3.99 square miles) and as of June 2022 it has 18,815 inhabitants.

== History ==
=== Early history ===
The settlement dates back to the late 13th century. First recorded mention of it comes from 1344's Peter's Pence, and it was called Henrychów (ecclesia de Henrichov). Other names used for Andrychów in the past are Indrzychów and Gendrzychów. During the German occupation of Poland, it was renamed into Andrichau. Historians claim that the name of the town comes from a Polish given name Jędrzej (Andrzej).

Andrychów was first mentioned in the records of Peter's Pence in 1344 as a small village in the Duchy of Zator, however an existing church was already mentioned in 1325. In 1345 Andrychów is said to have population of 105 and to cover the area of 27 km^{2} (10 sq mi). Most likely, its first residents were settlers from Klatovy in southern Bohemia. Jan Długosz in his Liber beneficiorum calls it Gendrychów, writing that it was a small village in the Silesian Duchy of Zator. In ca. 1440 the Zator Castle was captured by Polish troops, and finally, the Duchy of Zator, together with Duchy of Oświęcim were incorporated into the Kingdom of Poland on February 20, 1564, as Silesian County of Kraków Voivodeship, Lesser Poland Province.

During the reign of Sigismund II Augustus, Andrychów emerged as an administrative center of the area. The village belonged to the family of Schilling, who supported Protestant Reformation. In 1655, during the Swedish invasion of Poland, Andrychów was burned by Swedish units heading for Żywiec. In 1704, first attempt to grant town charter to Andrychów took place, but it did not succeed. Three years later the village was once again burned to the ground by the Swedes, during the Great Northern War. After the destruction, Andrychów's owner invited weavers from Silesia, Belgium and Saxony, and as a result, Andrychów became an important center of weaving. Finally, in 1767 it received town charter from King Stanisław August Poniatowski.

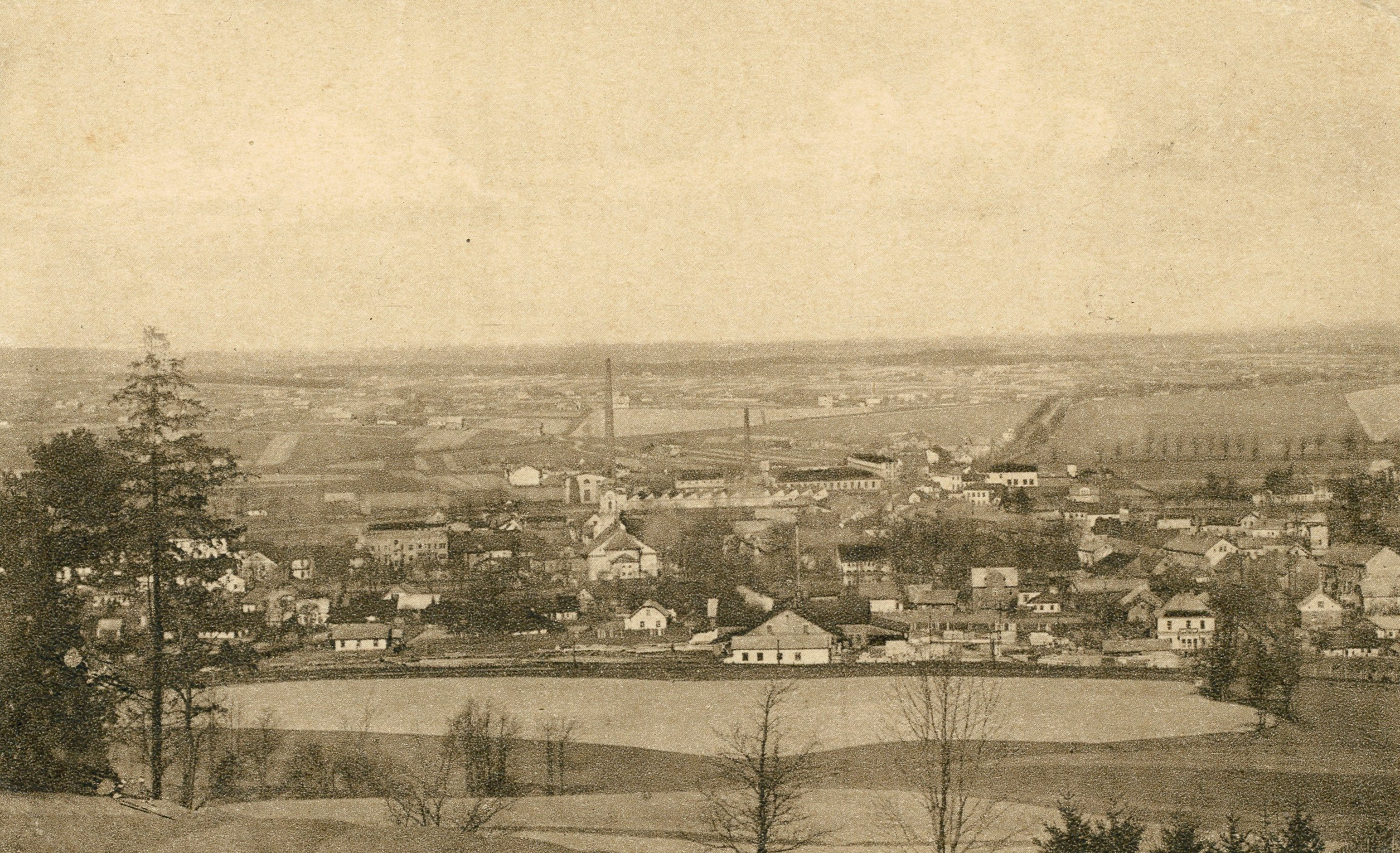
Andrychów in the 1930s

During the First Partition of Poland, in the summer 1772, Andrychów was seized by the Austrian troops. New authorities changed its name into Andrichau, and until November 1918, it remained in Austrian province of Galicia. For some time, both the village of Andrychów and the town of Andrychów existed. In 1778 the village had a population of 598, and the town 2,475. In 1791, first school was opened in the town. In the mid-1800s, the Industrial Revolution reached Andrychów, together with an influx of Jewish settlers, for whom a synagogue was built in 1885. On June 27, 1868, the town and the village were merged, and two years later, Andrychów received its first rail connection. On June 20, 1893, large parts of the town burned in a fire.

In the Second Polish Republic Andrychów belonged to Kraków Voivodeship. In 1926 the town was electrified, and in 1934–1939, several public works projects were carried out, including a sewage system, improved road system, a swimming pool and a municipal stadium. First gas station was opened in 1929, and since 1926, the town had regular bus connections with Kraków and Bielsko-Biała.

=== World War II ===
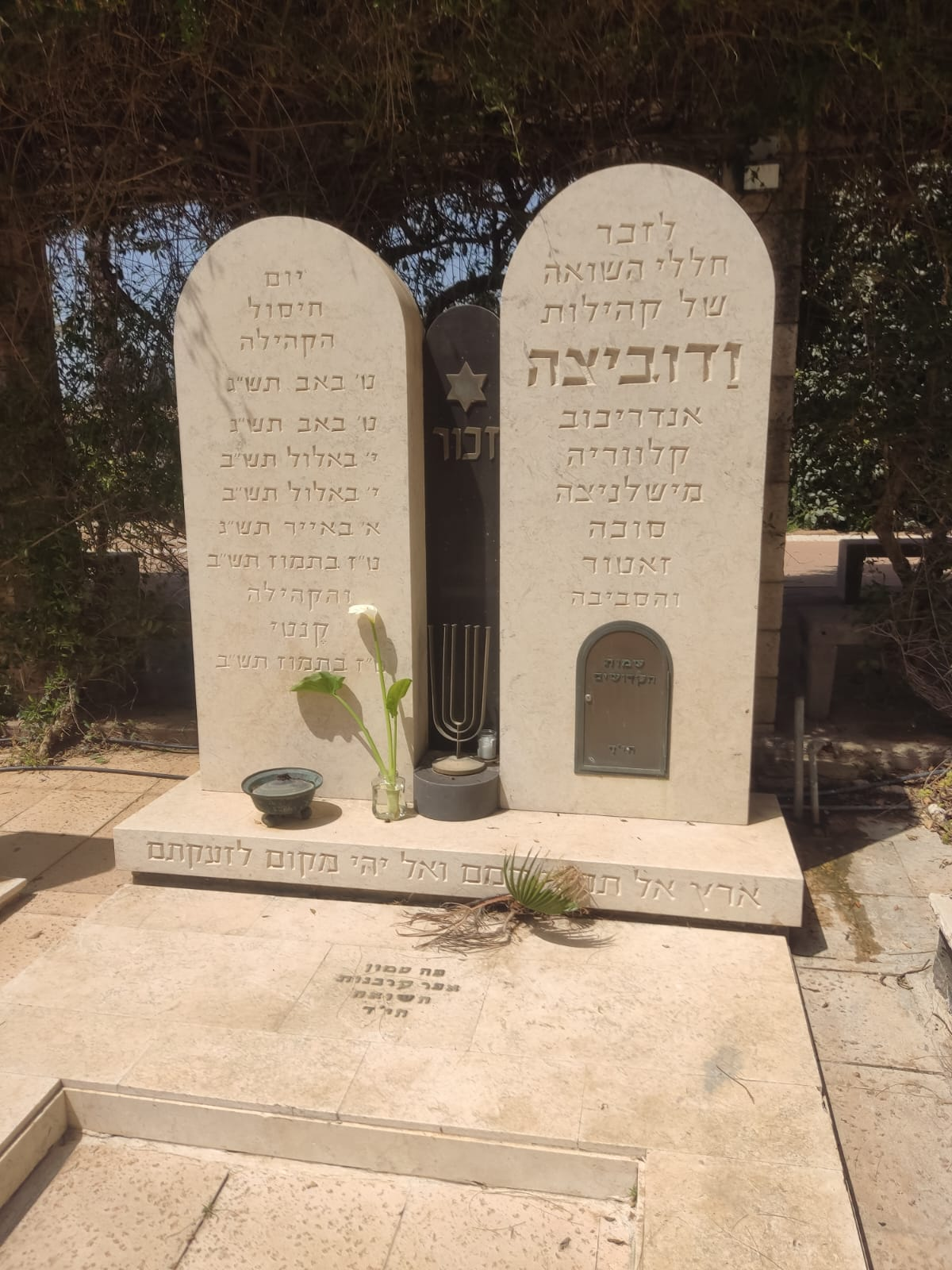
A monument in memory of the Jews who were murdered in the Holocaust in the Andrychów community and the surrounding area. In the Kiryat Shaul cemetery

On September 4, 1939, Andrychów was captured by the Wehrmacht at the beginning of World War II. The town was incorporated directly into the Third Reich, and on November 24, 1939, the Germans burned the local synagogue. They conscripted Jews for forced labor and beat and tortured members of the Jewish community. In September, 1941, the Germans established a Jewish ghetto in a poor part of town, with the displaced Poles taking over Jewish houses. The Jewish community continued to worship, organized clandestine schools for their children, and established a day care and public kitchens to feed the hungry. In July 1942, the Germans rounded up the Jewish population. About 100 ill and unfit were sent to Wadowice and from there to be murdered at the Belzec extermination camp. Another 40 were sent to Auschwitz where most were immediately murdered or perished later from starvation, beatings, or disease. More than 100 were sent to labor camps and another 60 to the Wadowice ghetto.

Later some Jews who had been sent to the Wadowice ghetto were sent back to Andrychów because their labor was needed. In July 1943, the men in this group were sent to other labor camps and in November, the women were sent to Auschwitz. About 25 Jews from Andrychów were thought to have survived the Holocaust.

Germans retreated westwards on January 26, 1945, and next day Andrychów was captured by the Red Army. Afterwards, it was restored to Poland, although with a Soviet-installed communist regime, which stayed in power until the Fall of Communism in the 1980s.

=== Post-war period ===
In the Polish People's Republic, Andrychów was an important center of textile industry, with a large cotton plant (Zakłady Przemysłu Bawełnianego). Another important factory was Andrychów Machine Works (Andrychowska Fabryka Maszyn), which was based on the German World War II era factory Areo-Stall Werke.

From 1975 to 1998, Andrychów was administratively located in the Bielsko-Biała Voivodeship.

== Transport ==
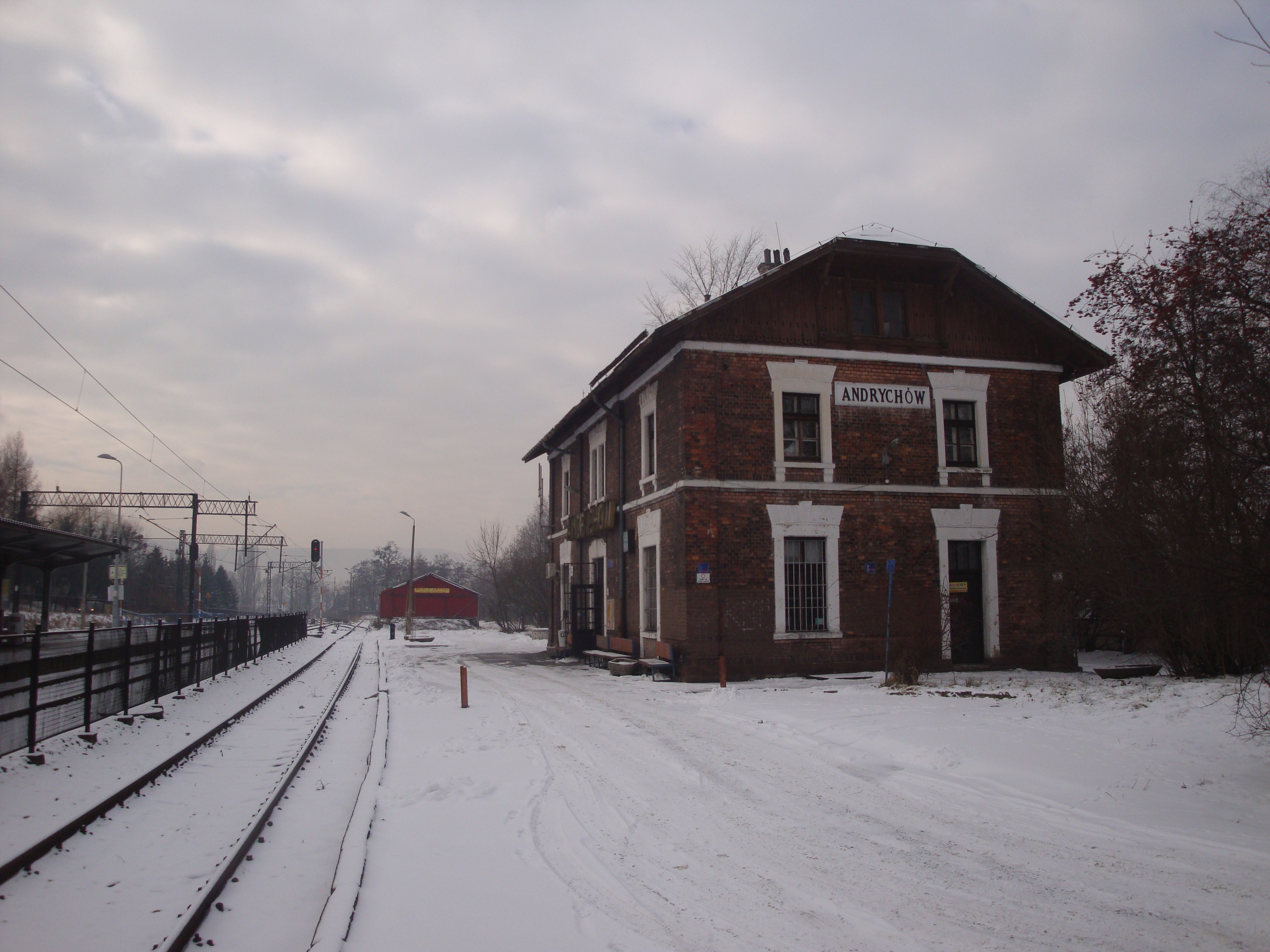
Andrychów railway station

=== Road transport ===
Andrychów lies at the intersection of national road 52 (Kraków–Bielsko-Biała) and voivodeship road 781 (Chrzanów–Łękawica). Public transport is provided by buses of the Intercommune Transit Authority (Międzygminny Zakład Komunikacyjny) Andrychów–Kęty–Porąbka, which has 18 lines, including 6 in Andrychów itself.

=== Rail transport ===
Andrychów has a railway station along the railway line 117 (Bielsko-Biała Główna–Kalwaria Zebrzydowska Lanckorona).

== Tourism ==
Andrychów is a tourist centre in the Little Beskids. Tourist attractions include the old town with historic park, baroque church, an 18th-century manor and a Jewish cemetery. Andrychów has a developed tourist infrastructure: accommodation, theme parks, active recreation infrastructure and local museums.

== Sports ==
Andrychów is home to a sports club Beskid, established in 1919.

== International relations ==
=== Twin towns – sister cities ===
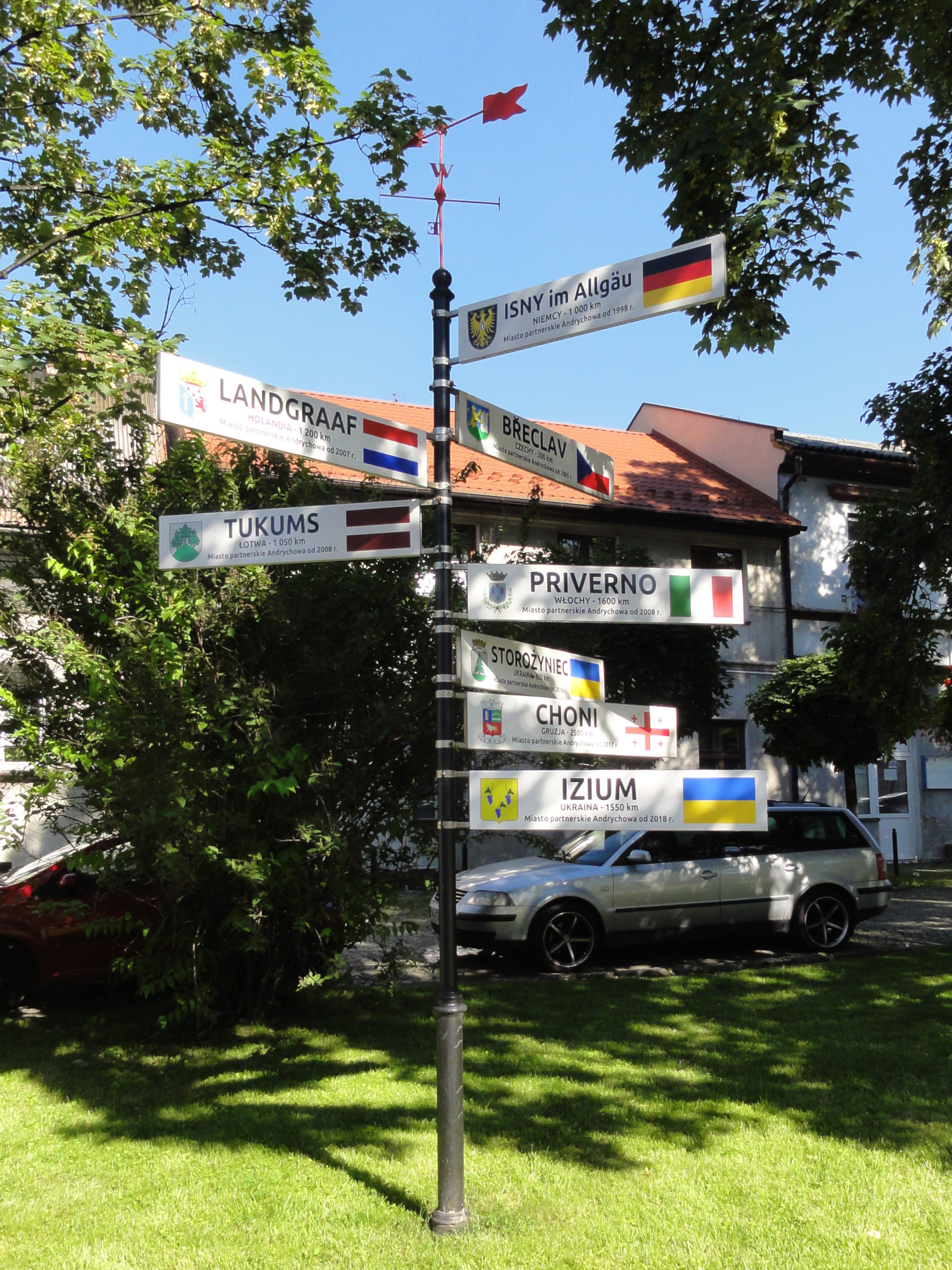
Signpost with twin towns

Andrychów is twinned with:

- Isny im Allgäu, Germany
- Břeclav, Czech Republic
- Landgraaf, Netherlands
- Priverno, Italy
- Tukums, Latvia
- Storozhynets, Ukraine
- Izyum, Ukraine
- (Georgia (country)) Khoni, Georgia
