= Połom, Szczytno County =

Połom
- Village
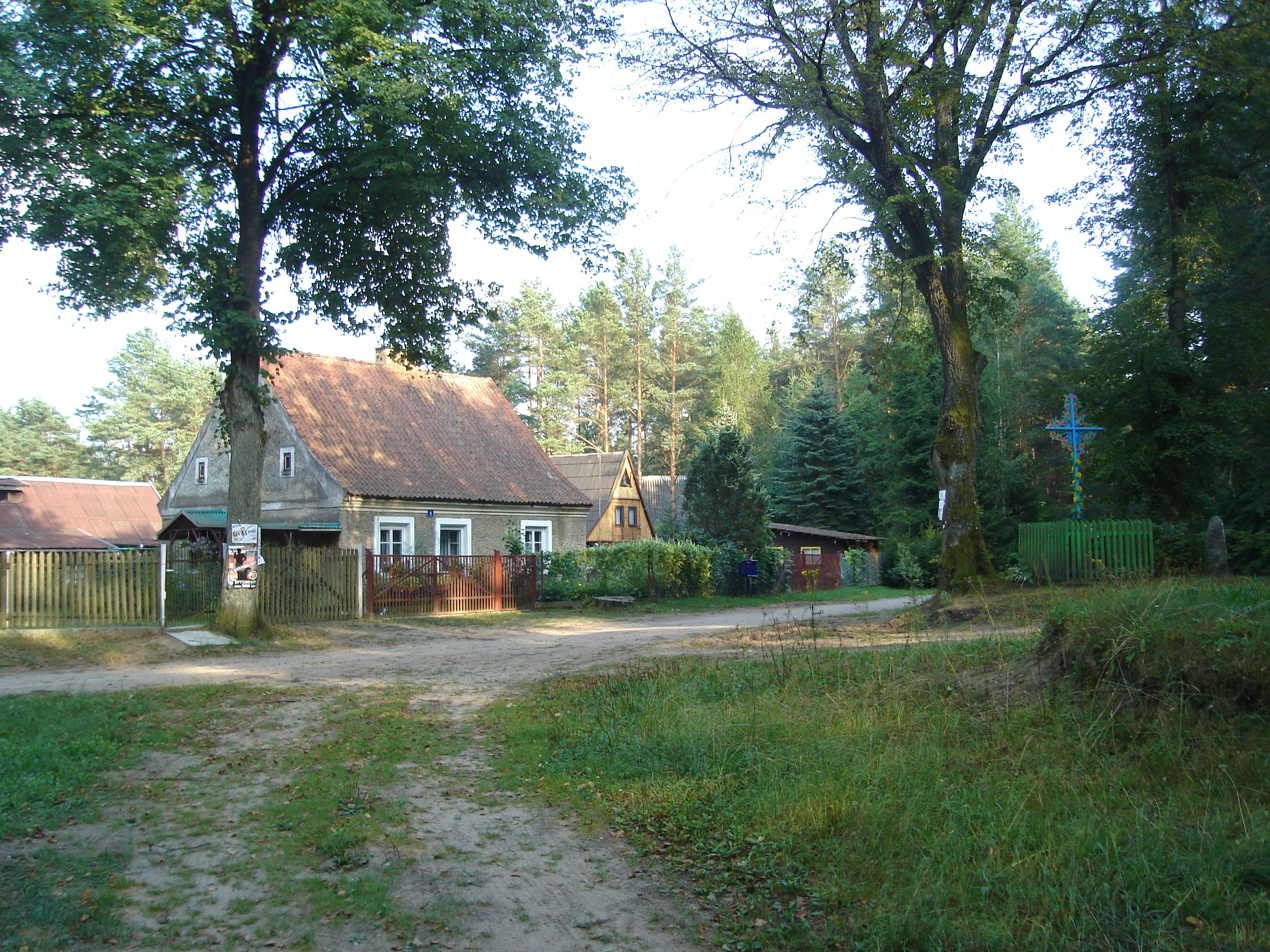

- Location within Poland
- Coordinates: 53°38′N 21°22′E
- Country: Poland
- Voivodeship: Warmian-Masurian
- County: Szczytno
- Gmina: Świętajno

Połom [ˈpɔwɔm] (German: Polommen) is a village in the administrative district of Gmina Świętajno, within Szczytno County, Warmian-Masurian Voivodeship, in northern Poland.
