= Kiełbasy =

- Village
- Location within Poland
- Coordinates: 53°29′N 21°12′E
- Country: Poland
- Voivodeship: Warmian-Masurian
- County: Szczytno
- Gmina: Rozogi

Kiełbasy [kʲɛu̯ˈbasɨ] (German: Kelbassen, 1935-45:Wehrberg) is a village in the administrative district of Gmina Rozogi, within Szczytno County, Warmian-Masurian Voivodeship, in northern Poland.

== Notable residents ==
- Willy Bachor (1921–2008), Heer soldier and Knight's Cross recipient
