= Myszadło =

- Settlement
- Location within Poland
- Coordinates: 53°34′32″N 21°16′36″E
- Country: Poland
- Voivodeship: Warmian-Masurian
- County: Szczytno
- Gmina: Świętajno

Myszadło [mɨˈʂadwɔ] (German: Forst Schwentainen) is a settlement in the administrative district of Gmina Świętajno, within Szczytno County, Warmian-Masurian Voivodeship, in northern Poland.
