= Łąck Mały =

- Settlement
- Location within Poland
- Coordinates: 53°35′43″N 21°15′53″E
- Country: Poland
- Voivodeship: Warmian-Masurian
- County: Szczytno
- Gmina: Świętajno

Łąck Mały [ˈwɔnt͡sk ˈmawɨ] (German: Klein Lontzig) is a settlement in the administrative district of Gmina Świętajno, within Szczytno County, Warmian-Masurian Voivodeship, in northern Poland.
