= Koczek =

- Village
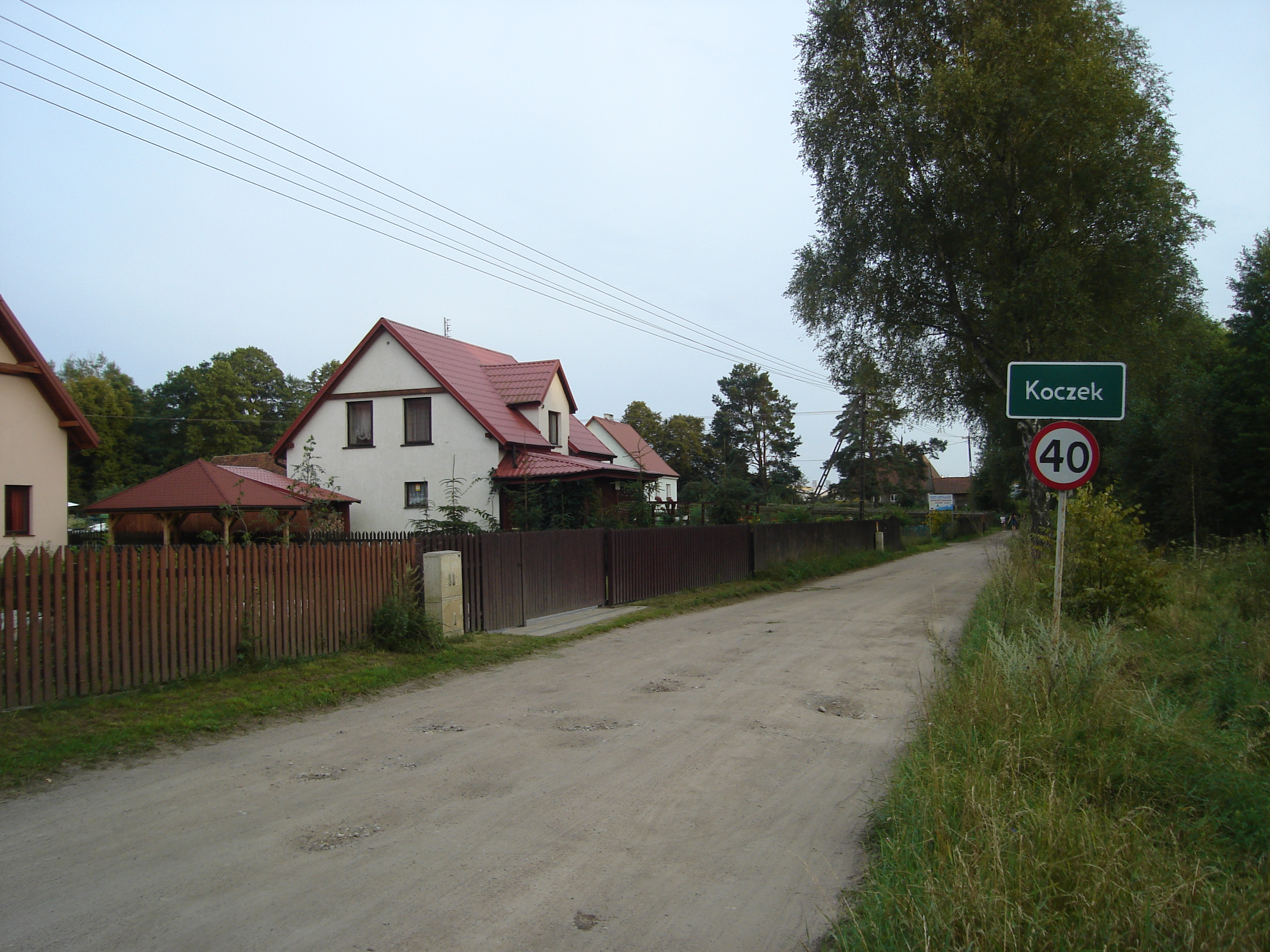

- Location within Poland
- Coordinates: 53°38′N 21°23′E
- Country: Poland
- Voivodeship: Warmian-Masurian
- County: Szczytno
- Gmina: Świętajno
- Time zone: UTC+1 (CET)
  - Summer (DST): UTC+2 (CEST)
- Vehicle registration: NSZ

Koczek [ˈkɔt͡ʂɛk] is a village in the administrative district of Gmina Świętajno, within Szczytno County, Warmian-Masurian Voivodeship, in north-eastern Poland. It is located in Masuria.

Two Polish citizens were murdered by Nazi Germany in the village during World War II.
