= Kokoszki, Warmian-Masurian Voivodeship =

Kokoszki
- Village
- Location within Poland
- Coordinates: 53°32′N 21°23′E
- Country: Poland
- Voivodeship: Warmian-Masurian
- County: Szczytno
- Gmina: Rozogi

Kokoszki [kɔˈkɔʂki] (German: Klein Lindengrund) is a village in the administrative district of Gmina Rozogi, within Szczytno County, Warmian-Masurian Voivodeship, in northern Poland.
