= Spychówko =

- Settlement
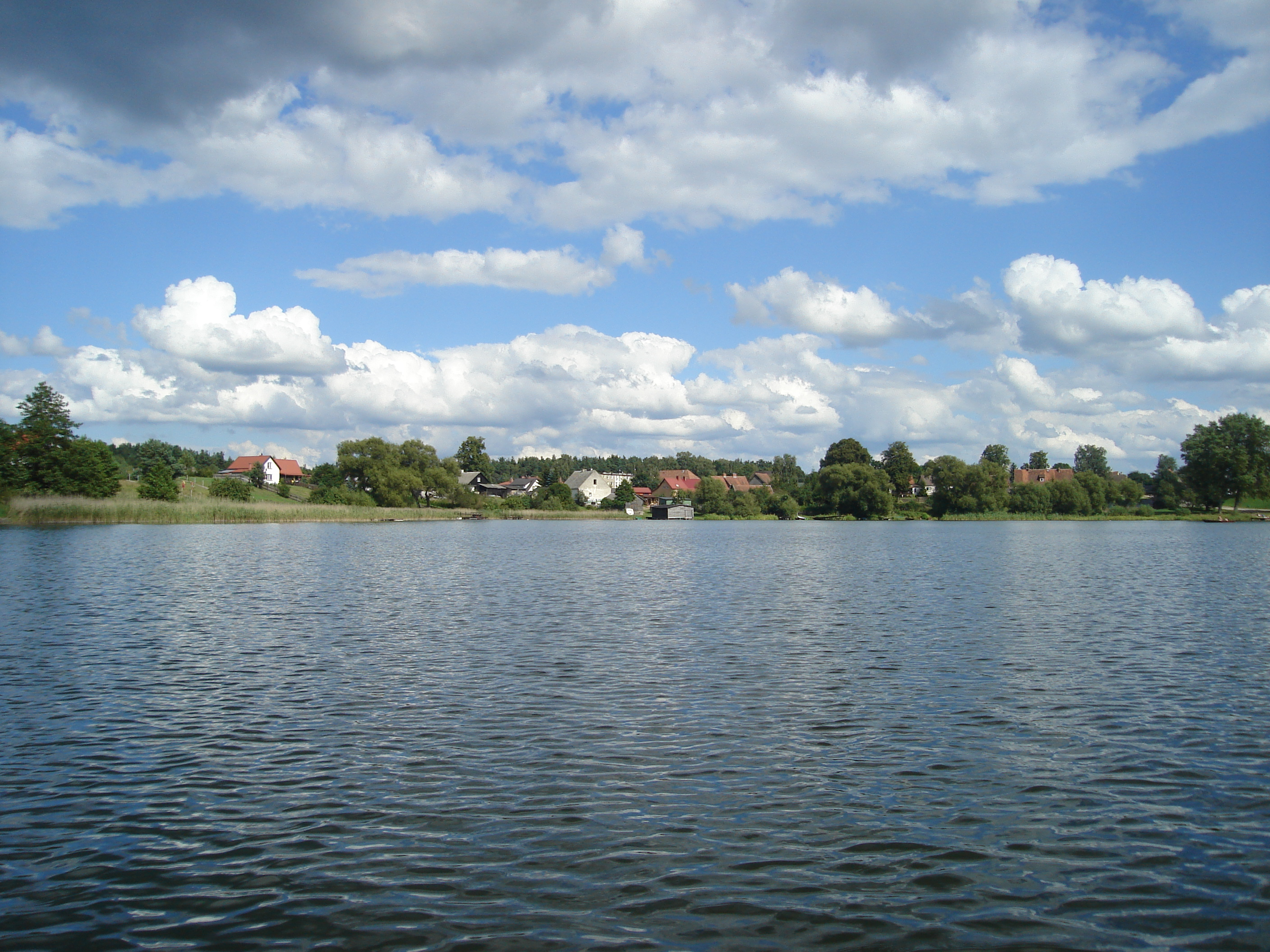

- Location within Poland
- Coordinates: 53°35′58″N 21°20′30″E
- Country: Poland
- Voivodeship: Warmian-Masurian
- County: Szczytno
- Gmina: Świętajno

Spychówko [spɨˈxufkɔ] (German: Klein Puppen) is a settlement in the administrative district of Gmina Świętajno, within Szczytno County, Warmian-Masurian Voivodeship, in northern Poland.
