= Spychowo =

- Village
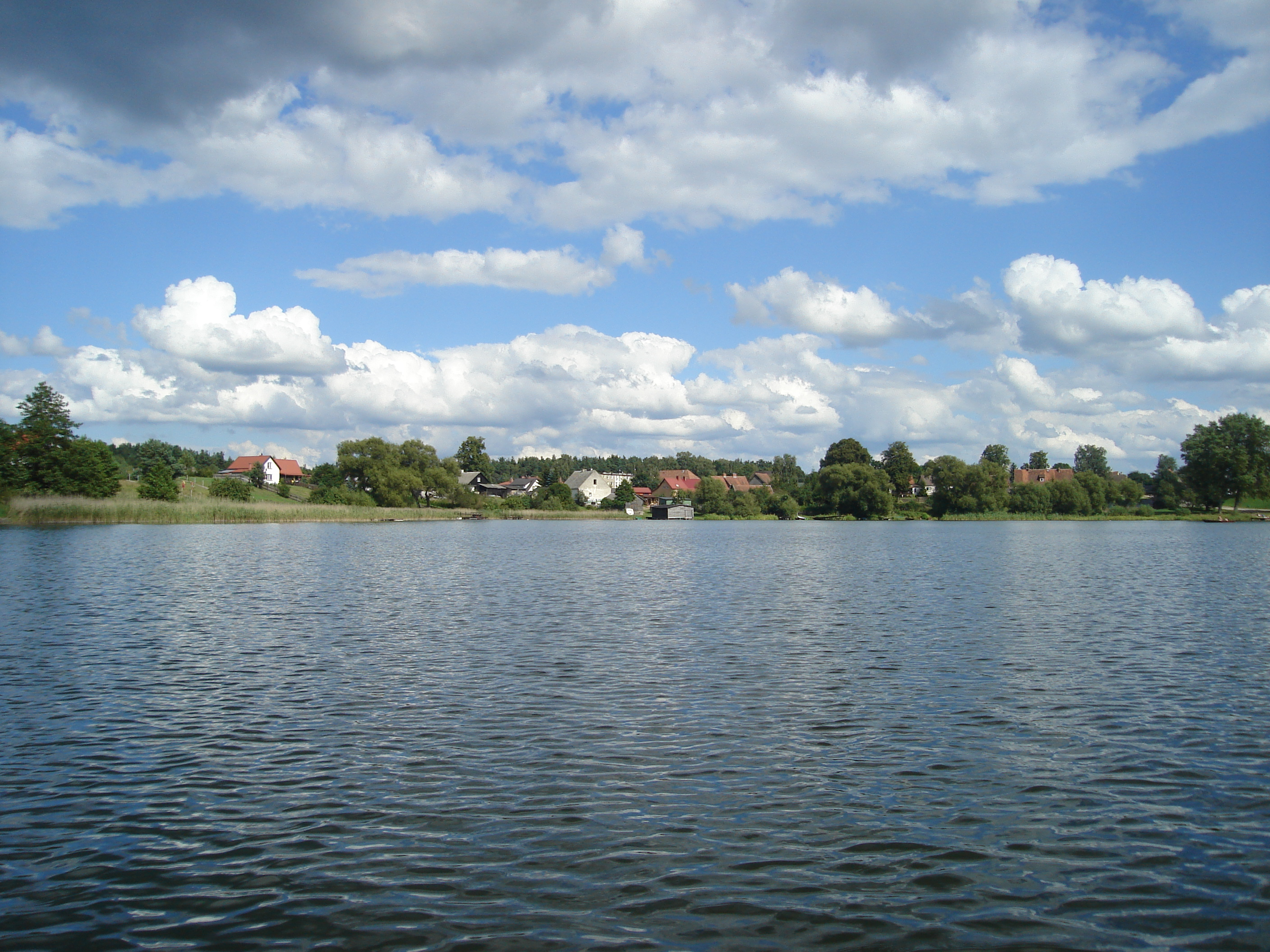

- Location within Poland
- Coordinates: 53°36′4″N 21°20′46″E
- Country: Poland
- Voivodeship: Warmian-Masurian
- County: Szczytno
- Gmina: Świętajno
- Population: 1,100
- Website: http://www.spychowo.com.pl

Spychowo pronounced [spɨˈxɔvɔ] (German: Puppen) is a village in the administrative district of Gmina Świętajno, within Szczytno County, Warmian-Masurian Voivodeship, in northern Poland. The village has a population of 1,100. Spychowo is the seat of the Spychowo forest district (Nadleśnictwo Spychowo), which manages the Pupy forest reserve.

== History ==
In mid 13th century the Teutonic Order, following the medieval conquest of Old Prussia, built a fortification at the place of an Old Prussian settlement.

The village was a favorite hunting post of the Prussian Kings and, after the Nazi rise to power, Hermann Göring. Before 1945 it was known as Puppen.

After World War II the village was initially renamed Pupy, which was changed to Spychowo in 1960.

On September 23, 1979 the local Protestant church was taken over by Catholics.

== Images ==
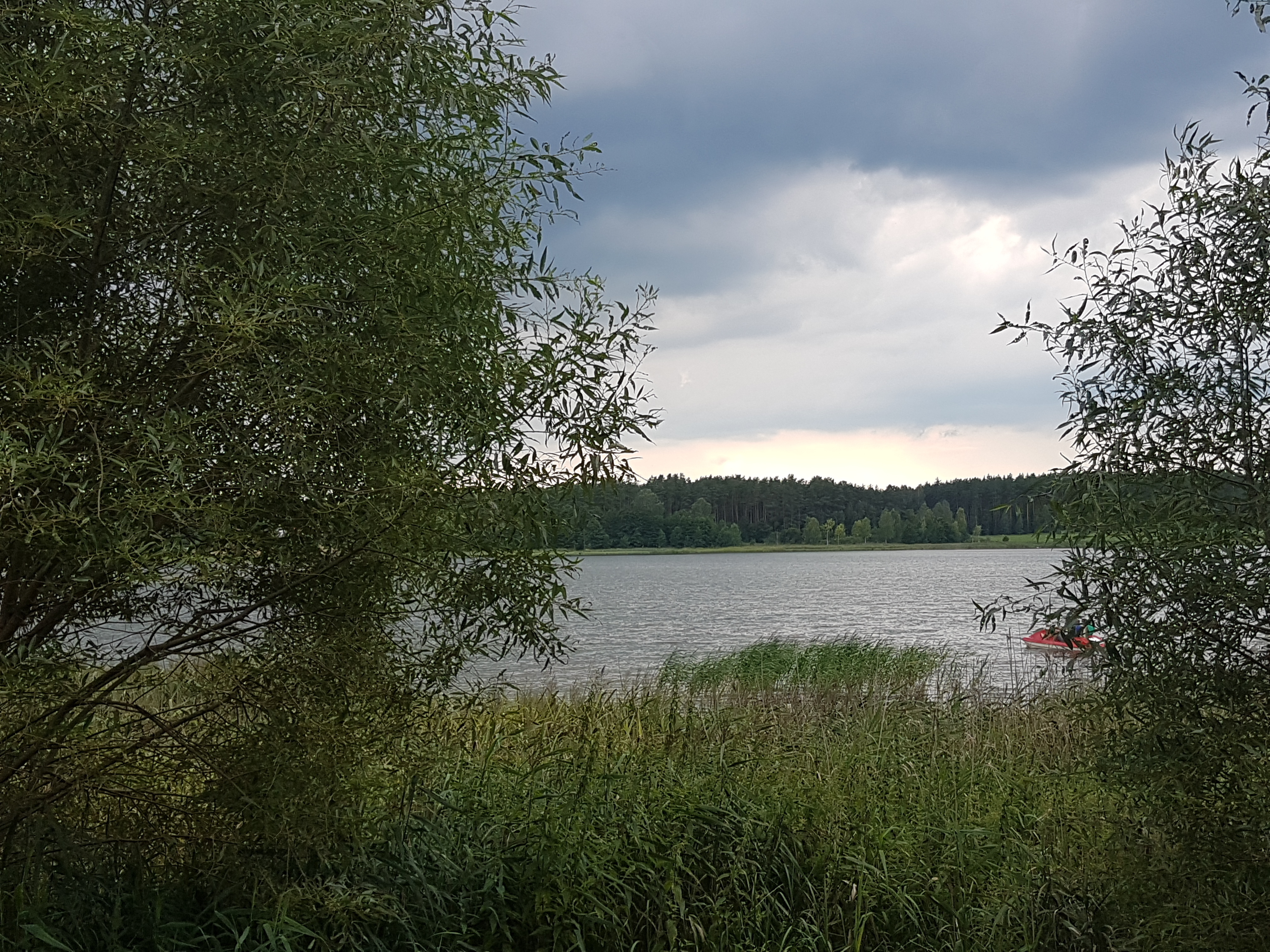
Spychowo Lake (Jezioro Spychowskie)
