= Kierwik =

- Settlement
- Location within Poland
- Coordinates: 53°36′41″N 21°22′19″E
- Country: Poland
- Voivodeship: Warmian-Masurian
- County: Szczytno
- Gmina: Świętajno

Kierwik [ˈkʲɛrvik] (German: Kurwick) is a settlement in the administrative district of Gmina Świętajno, within Szczytno County, Warmian-Masurian Voivodeship, in northern Poland.
