= Wysoki Grąd =

- Village
- Location within Poland
- Coordinates: 53°32′N 21°22′E
- Country: Poland
- Voivodeship: Warmian-Masurian
- County: Szczytno
- Gmina: Rozogi

Wysoki Grąd [vɨˈsɔki ˈɡrɔnt] (German: Lindengrund) is a village in the administrative district of Gmina Rozogi, within Szczytno County, Warmian-Masurian Voivodeship, in northern Poland.
