= Jerominy =

- Village
- Location within Poland
- Coordinates: 53°31′N 21°11′E
- Country: Poland
- Voivodeship: Warmian-Masurian
- County: Szczytno
- Gmina: Świętajno
- Population: 71

Jerominy [jɛrɔˈminɨ] (German: Jeromin) is a village in the administrative district of Gmina Świętajno, within Szczytno County, Warmian-Masurian Voivodeship, in northern Poland.

== Demography ==
As of the 2011 census, Jerominy had a population of 71, with a population density of 47.97 per square kilometre (124.2/sq mi). 52.1% of the population is female, while 47.9% is male.
