= Występ, Warmian-Masurian Voivodeship =

Występ
- Village
- Location within Poland
- Coordinates: 53°30′N 21°16′E
- Country: Poland
- Voivodeship: Warmian-Masurian
- County: Szczytno
- Gmina: Rozogi

Występ [ˈvɨstɛmp] (German: Wystemp, 1938-45: Höhenwerder) is a village in the administrative district of Gmina Rozogi, within Szczytno County, Warmian-Masurian Voivodeship, in northern Poland.
