= Cis, Warmian-Masurian Voivodeship =

Cis
- Village
- Location within Poland
- Coordinates: 53°32′N 21°14′E
- Country: Poland
- Voivodeship: Warmian-Masurian
- County: Szczytno
- Gmina: Świętajno

Cis [t͡ɕis] (German: Friedrichsthal) is a village in the administrative district of Gmina Świętajno, within Szczytno County, Warmian-Masurian Voivodeship, in northern Poland.
