= Borki Rozowskie =

- Village
- Location within Poland
- Coordinates: 53°32′N 21°20′E
- Country: Poland
- Voivodeship: Warmian-Masurian
- County: Szczytno
- Gmina: Rozogi
- Population (approx.): 100

Borki Rozowskie [ˈbɔrki rɔˈzɔfskʲɛ] (German: Borken bei Farienen) is a village in the administrative district of Gmina Rozogi, within Szczytno County, Warmian-Masurian Voivodeship, in northern Poland.

The village has an approximate population of 100.
