= Racibórz, Warmian-Masurian Voivodeship =

Racibórz
- Village
- Location within Poland
- Coordinates: 53°35′14″N 21°16′10″E
- Country: Poland
- Voivodeship: Warmian-Masurian
- County: Szczytno
- Gmina: Świętajno
- Time zone: UTC+1 (CET)
  - Summer (DST): UTC+2 (CEST)
- Vehicle registration: NSZ

Racibórz [raˈt͡ɕibuʂ] (Note: German: Ratzeburg) is a village in the administrative district of Gmina Świętajno, within Szczytno County, Warmian-Masurian Voivodeship, in northern Poland. It is located in Masuria.

== History ==
In 1454, the region was incorporated into the Kingdom of Poland by King Casimir IV Jagiellon. Following the Thirteen Years' War (1454–1466), it was part of Poland as a fief, initially held by the Teutonic Knights. From the 18th century it was part of the Kingdom of Prussia, and from 1871 to 1945 it was part of Germany, before it became, once again, part of Poland following Germany's defeat in World War II.
