= Bystrz =

- Settlement
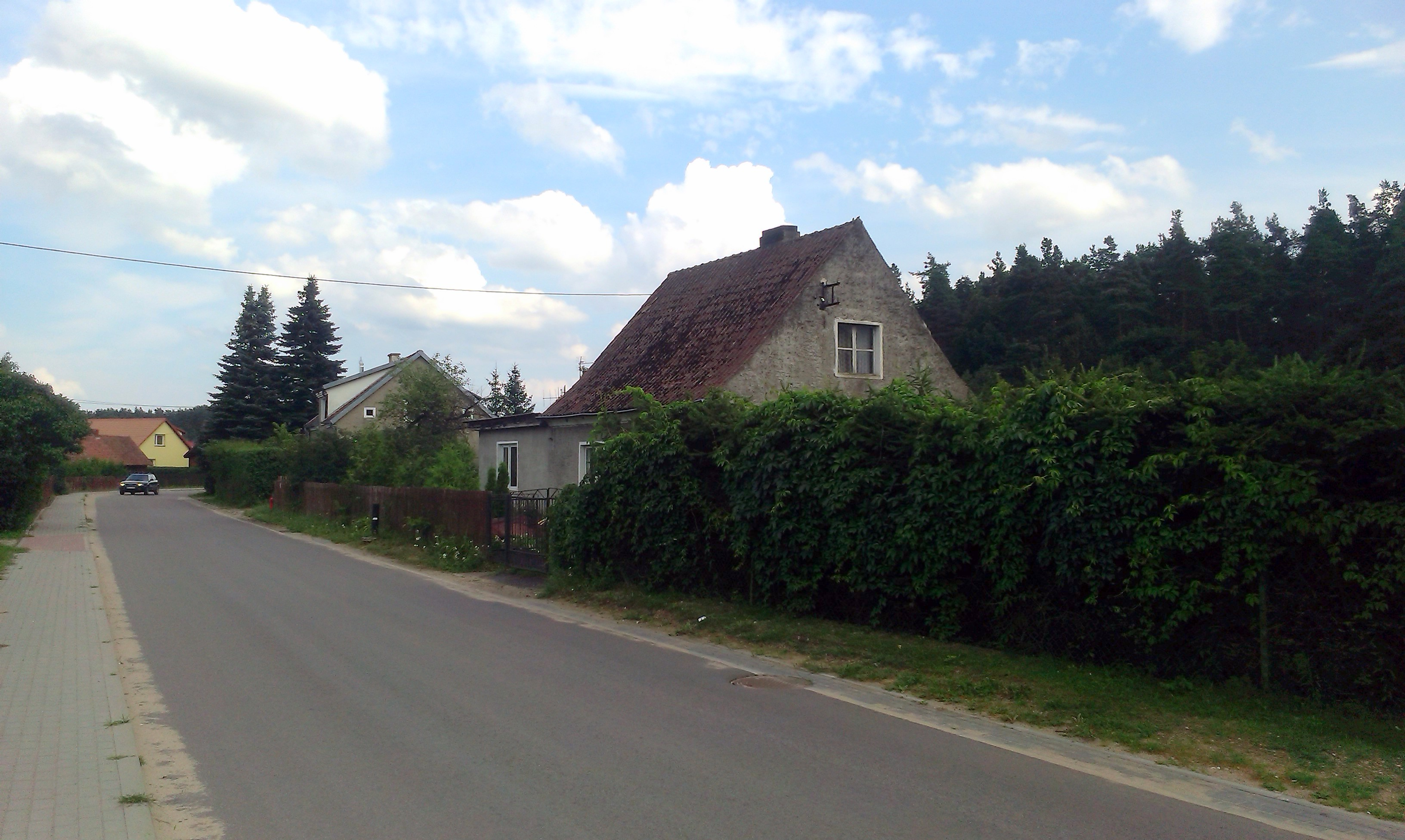

- Location within Poland
- Coordinates: 53°36′30″N 21°21′28″E
- Country: Poland
- Voivodeship: Warmian-Masurian
- County: Szczytno
- Gmina: Świętajno

Bystrz [bɨstʂ] (German: Brücknersmühl) is a settlement in the administrative district of Gmina Świętajno, within Szczytno County, Warmian-Masurian Voivodeship, in northern Poland.
