= Jerutki =

- Village
- Location within Poland
- Coordinates: 53°35′24″N 21°8′23″E
- Country: Poland
- Voivodeship: Warmian-Masurian
- County: Szczytno
- Gmina: Świętajno

Jerutki [jɛˈrutki] (German: Klein Jerutten) is a village in the administrative district of Gmina Świętajno, within Szczytno County, Warmian-Masurian Voivodeship, in northern Poland.
