= Łuka, Warmian-Masurian Voivodeship =

Łuka
- Village
- Location within Poland
- Coordinates: 53°25′N 21°9′E
- Country: Poland
- Voivodeship: Warmian-Masurian
- County: Szczytno
- Gmina: Rozogi

Łuka [ˈwuka] (German: Lucka) is a village in the administrative district of Gmina Rozogi, within Szczytno County, Warmian-Masurian Voivodeship, in northern Poland.
