= Antonia, Warmian-Masurian Voivodeship =

Antonia
- Village
- Location within Poland
- Coordinates: 53°27′18″N 21°25′41″E
- Country: Poland
- Voivodeship: Warmian-Masurian
- County: Szczytno
- Gmina: Rozogi

Antonia [anˈtɔɲa] is a village in the administrative district of Gmina Rozogi, within Szczytno County, Warmian-Masurian Voivodeship, in northern Poland.

Antonia is located in the southern part of the Warmian–Masurian Voivodeship, 32 kilometres southeast of the county seat of Szczytno (formerly Ortelsburg). Until 1945, the village was located immediately south of the border between Poland and the Province of East Prussia of the German Empire. Today, the border between the Warmian–Masurian Voivodeship and the Masovian Voivodeship runs only a few hundred metres east of the village, following the Szkwa river.
