= Spaliny Wielkie =

- Village
- Location within Poland
- Coordinates: 53°29′N 21°26′E
- Country: Poland
- Voivodeship: Warmian-Masurian
- County: Szczytno
- Gmina: Rozogi

Spaliny Wielkie [spaˈlinɨ ˈvjɛlkʲɛ] (German: Gross Spalienen, 1938–45:Neuwiesen) is a village in the administrative district of Gmina Rozogi, within Szczytno County, Warmian-Masurian Voivodeship, in northern Poland.
