= Głogoczów =

- Village
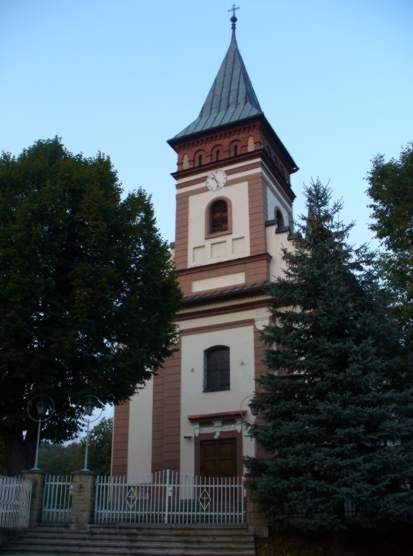
- Saint Mary Magdalene Church

- Location within Poland
- Coordinates: 49°53′49″N 19°52′33″E
- Country: Poland
- Voivodeship: Lesser Poland
- County: Myślenice
- Gmina: Myślenice
- Highest elevation: 340 m (1,120 ft)
- Lowest elevation: 250 m (820 ft)
- Population: 2,800

Głogoczów [ɡwɔˈɡɔt͡ʂuf] is a village in the administrative district of Gmina Myślenice, within Myślenice County, Lesser Poland Voivodeship, in southern Poland.
