= Rozogi, Szczytno County =

Rozogi
- Village
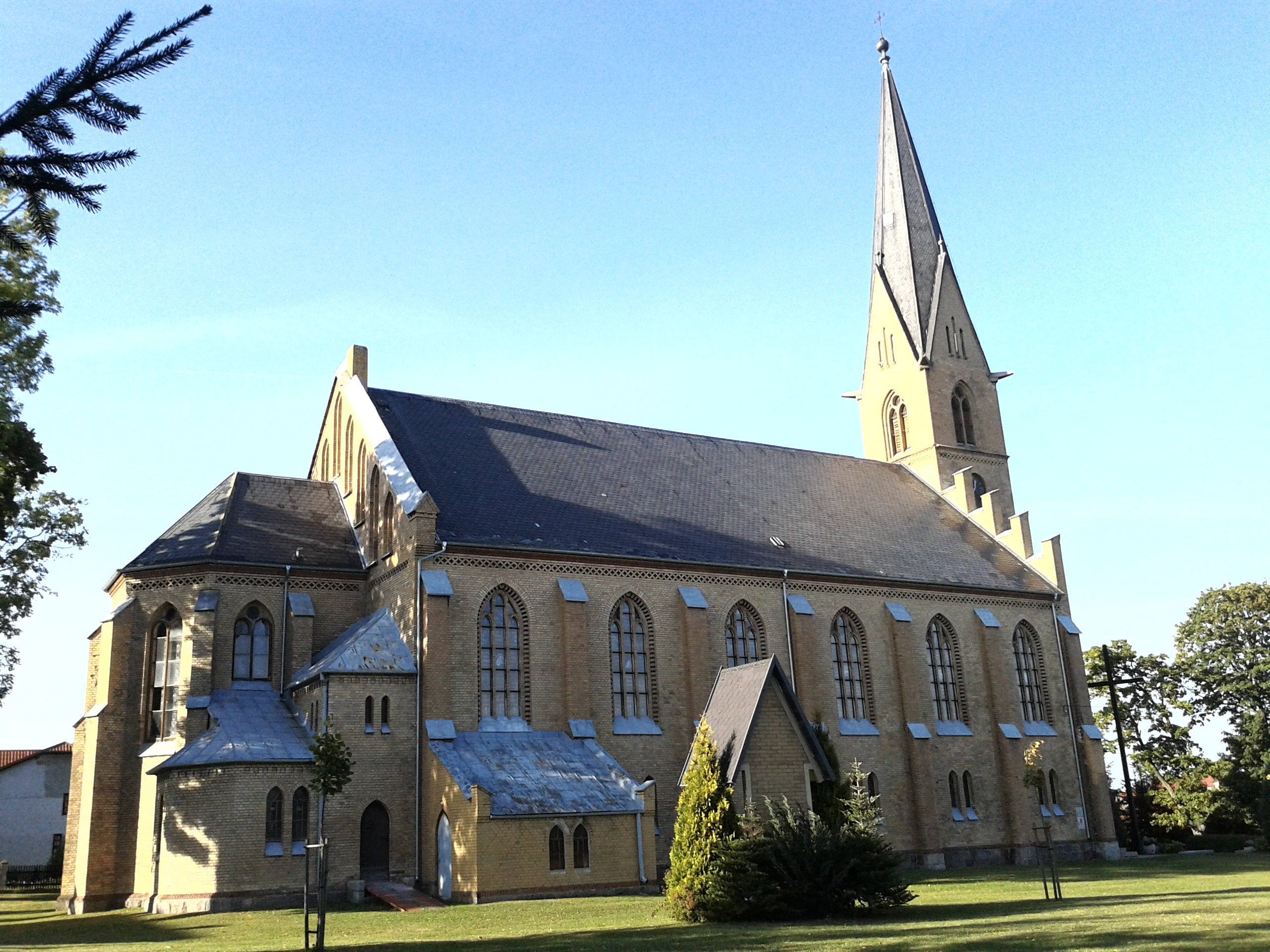
- Church of Saint Mary Magdalene

- Location within Poland
- Coordinates: 53°29′1″N 21°21′28″E
- Country: Poland
- Voivodeship: Warmian-Masurian
- County: Szczytno
- Gmina: Rozogi
- Founded: 1448

Population
  - Total: 1,418
- Time zone: UTC+1 (CET)
  - Summer (DST): UTC+2 (CEST)
- Vehicle registration: NSZ
- Primary airport: Olsztyn-Mazury Airport
- Website: http://www.rozogi.pl

Rozogi [rɔˈzɔɡi] is a village in Szczytno County, Warmian-Masurian Voivodeship, in north-eastern Poland. It is the seat of the gmina (administrative district) called Gmina Rozogi. It is located in the historic region of Masuria.

== History ==
The village was founded in 1448, although there are traces of earlier human settlement near the village, a former pagan cemetery. In 1811 amber deposits were discovered there. The local Polish secret resistance was active and smuggled weapons through Rozogi to the nearby Russian Partition of Poland during the January Uprising, and sheltered Polish insurgents fleeing the Russian Partition. In the late 19th century, the village had an exclusively Polish population of 2,171, mostly living off farming and smuggling cloth, tobacco and vodka to the nearby Russian Partition. There were three distilleries and two brickyards near the village. During World War II, in 1944, the Polish Home Army seized a German military warehouse, obtaining equipment and ammunition.
