= Dąbrowy, Warmian-Masurian Voivodeship =

Dąbrowy
- Village
- Location within Poland
- Coordinates: 53°26′26″N 21°22′16″E
- Country: Poland
- Voivodeship: Warmian-Masurian
- County: Szczytno
- Gmina: Rozogi
- Population: 1,300

Dąbrowy [dɔmˈbrɔvɨ] is a village in the administrative district of Gmina Rozogi, within Szczytno County, Warmian-Masurian Voivodeship, in northern Poland.

The village has a population of 1,300.
