= Kowalik (surname) =

Kowalik is a Polish surname. The word has two literal meanings: a bird of the nuthatch genus or a diminutive of Kowal, meaning "smith", or "blacksmith". Notable people with the surname include:

- Fabian Kowalik (1908–1954), a professional baseball pitcher
- Janusz Kowalik (born 1944), a Polish football player
- Jerzy Kowalik (born 1961), Polish football player and manager
- Jiří Kowalík (born 1977), a Czech footballer
- John Kowalik (1910–1978), an American football player
- Małgorzata Hołub-Kowalik (born 1992), Polish athlete
- Marlena Kowalik (born 1984), a Polish-German football midfielder
- Mirosław Kowalik (born 1969), a Polish motorcycle speedway rider
- Trent Kowalik (born 1995), an American actor, dancer, and singer
