= Łąck Wielki =

- Settlement
- Location within Poland
- Coordinates: 53°34′56″N 21°16′13″E
- Country: Poland
- Voivodeship: Warmian-Masurian
- County: Szczytno
- Gmina: Świętajno

Łąck Wielki (Polish pronunciation: [ˈwɔntsk ˈfjɛlkʲi]; German: Groß Lontzig) is a settlement in the administrative district of Gmina Świętajno, within Szczytno County, Warmian-Masurian Voivodeship, in northern Poland.
