= Kowalik, Warmian-Masurian Voivodeship =

Kowalik
- Village
- Location within Poland
- Coordinates: 53°30′N 21°28′E
- Country: Poland
- Voivodeship: Warmian-Masurian
- County: Szczytno
- Gmina: Rozogi

Kowalik [kɔˈvalik] (German: Waldburg) is a village in the administrative district of Gmina Rozogi, within Szczytno County, Warmian-Masurian Voivodeship, in northern Poland.
