= Olsztyn =

Capital of the Warmian-Masurian Voivodeship, Poland

- City county
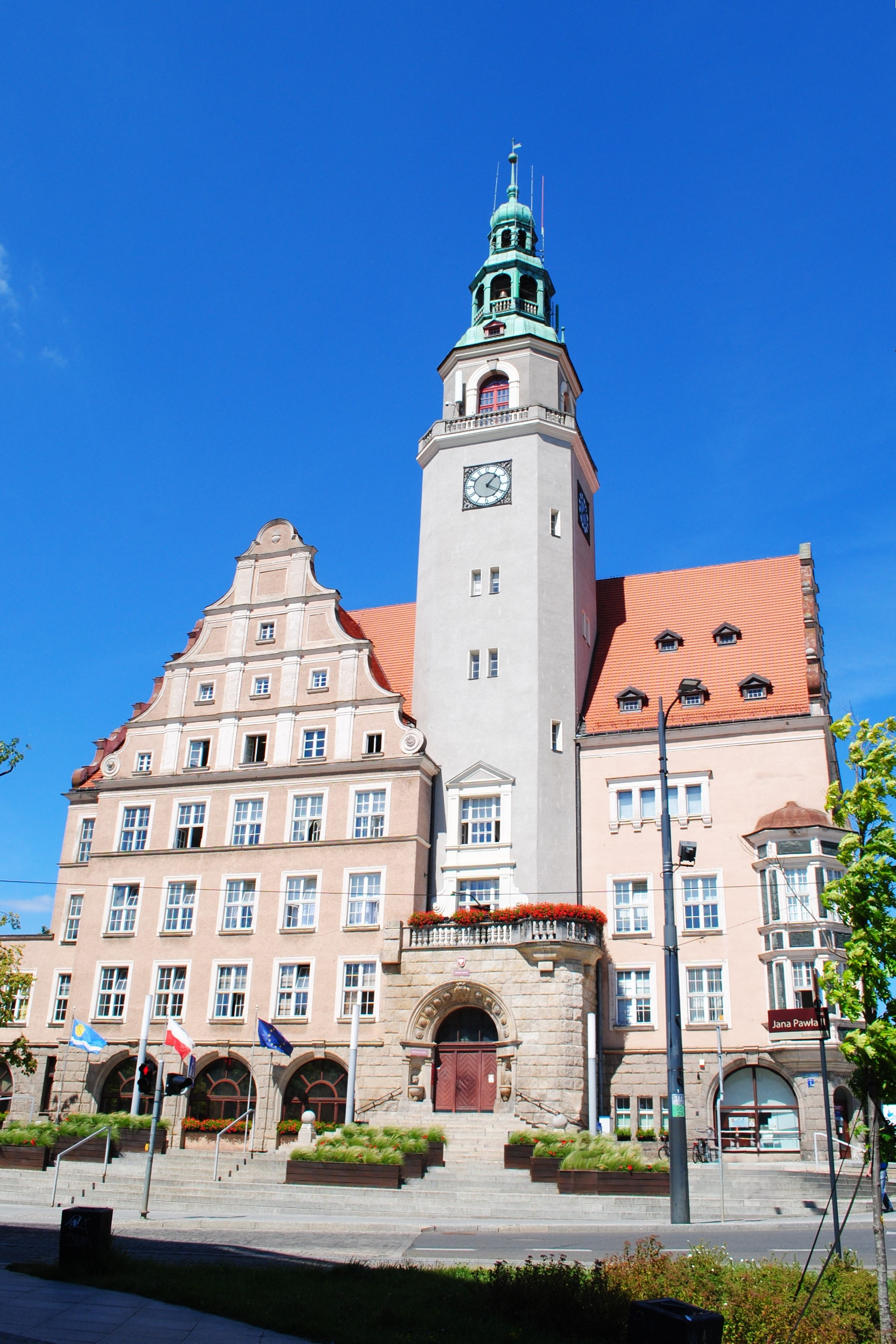
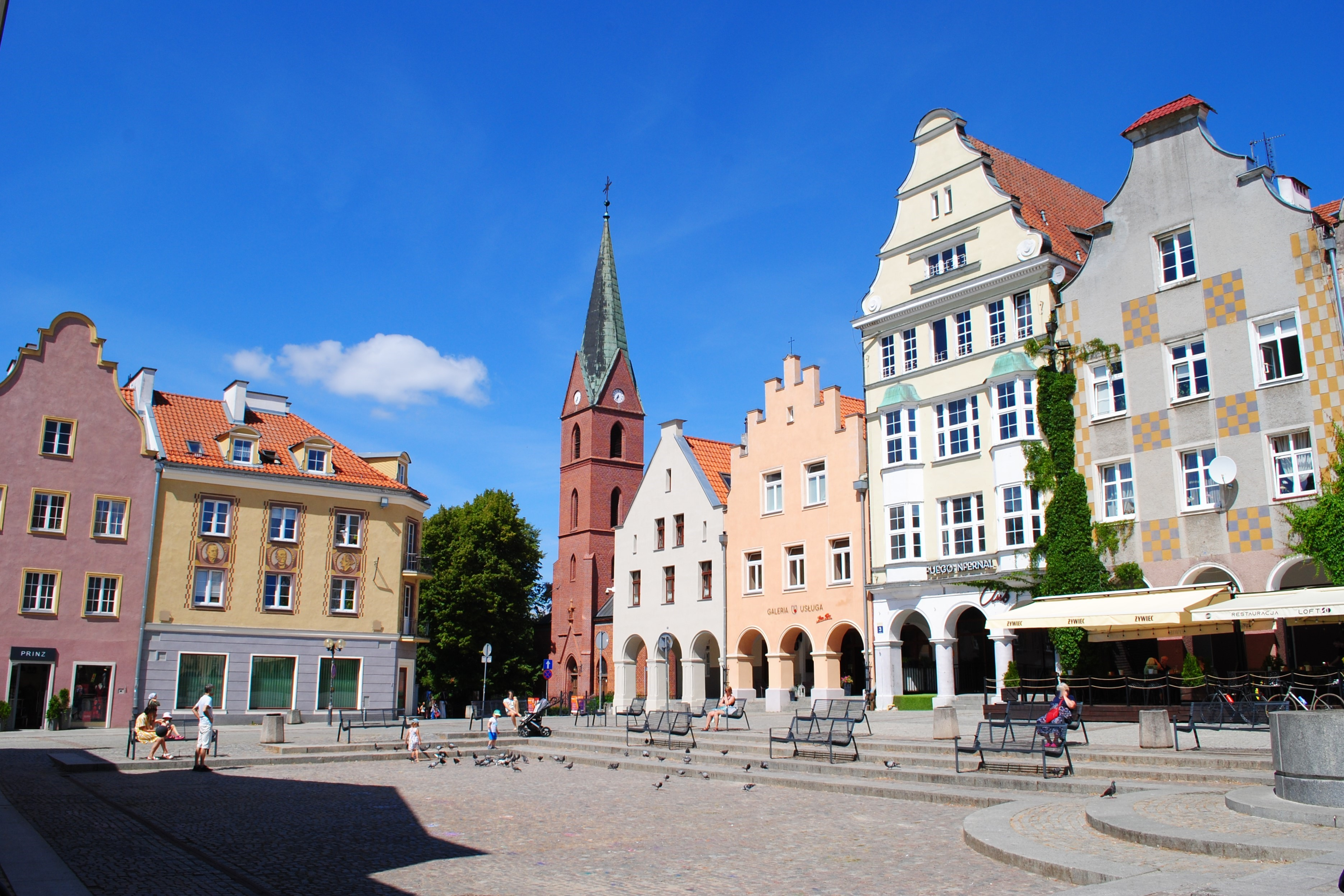
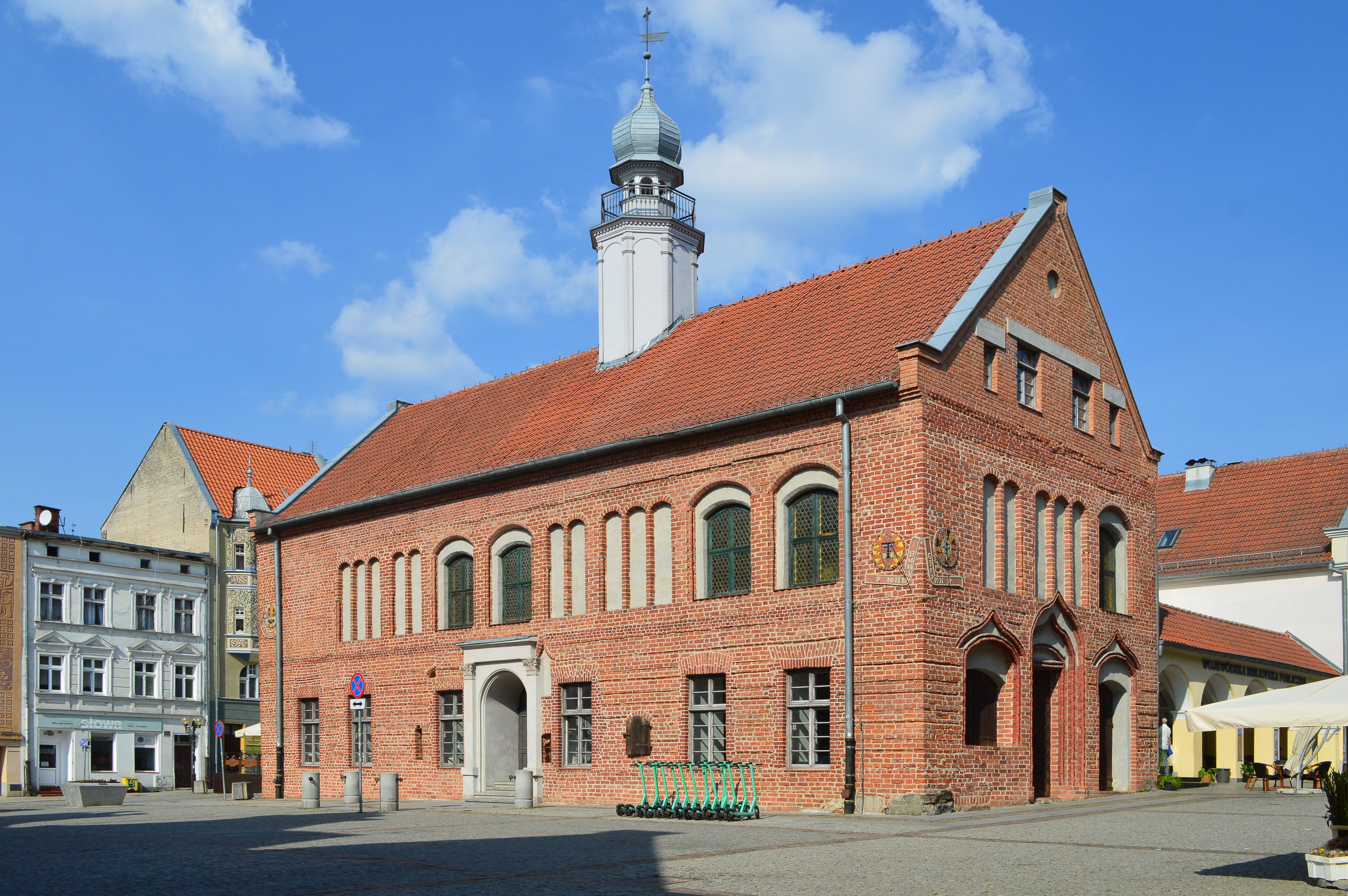
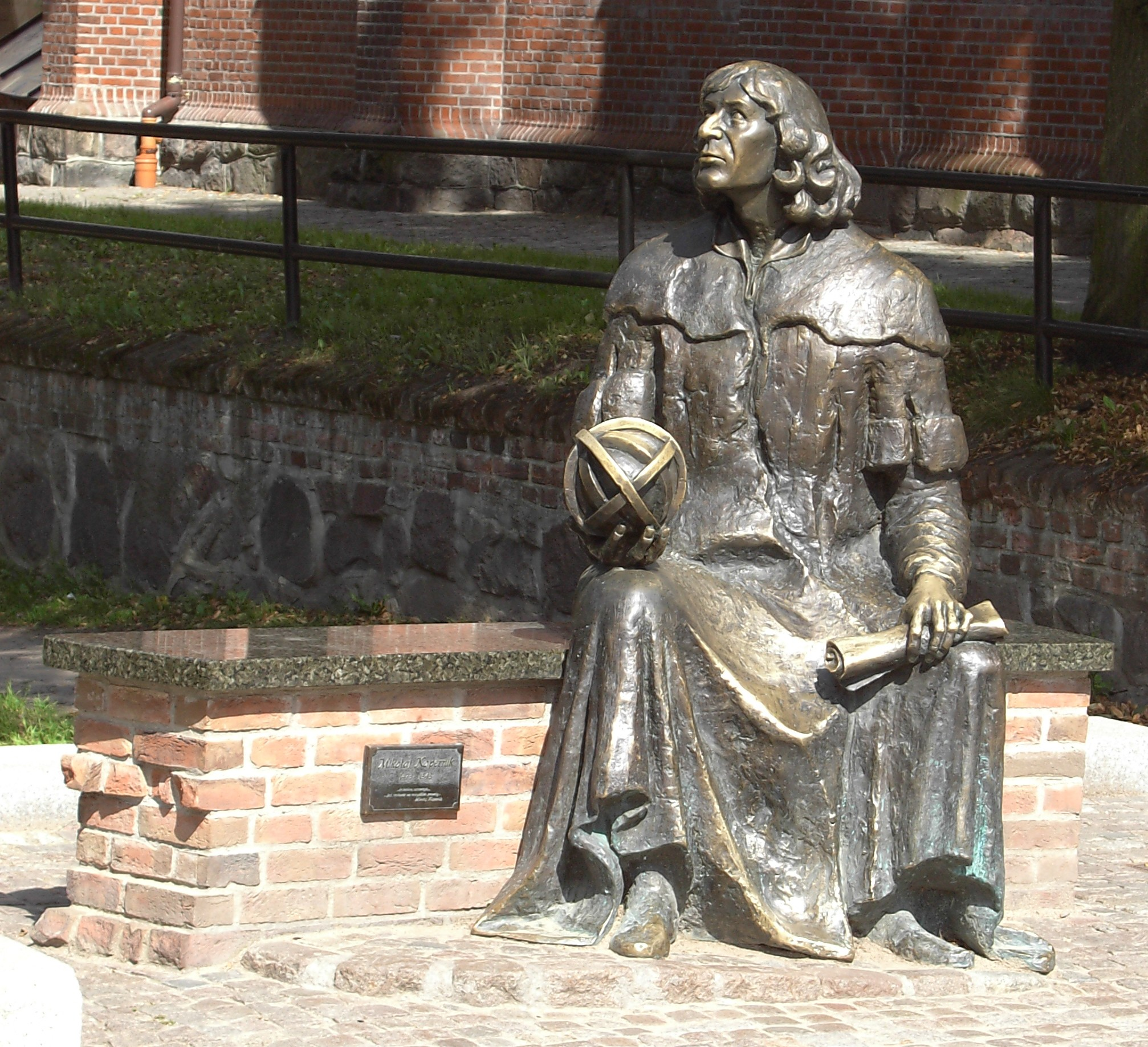
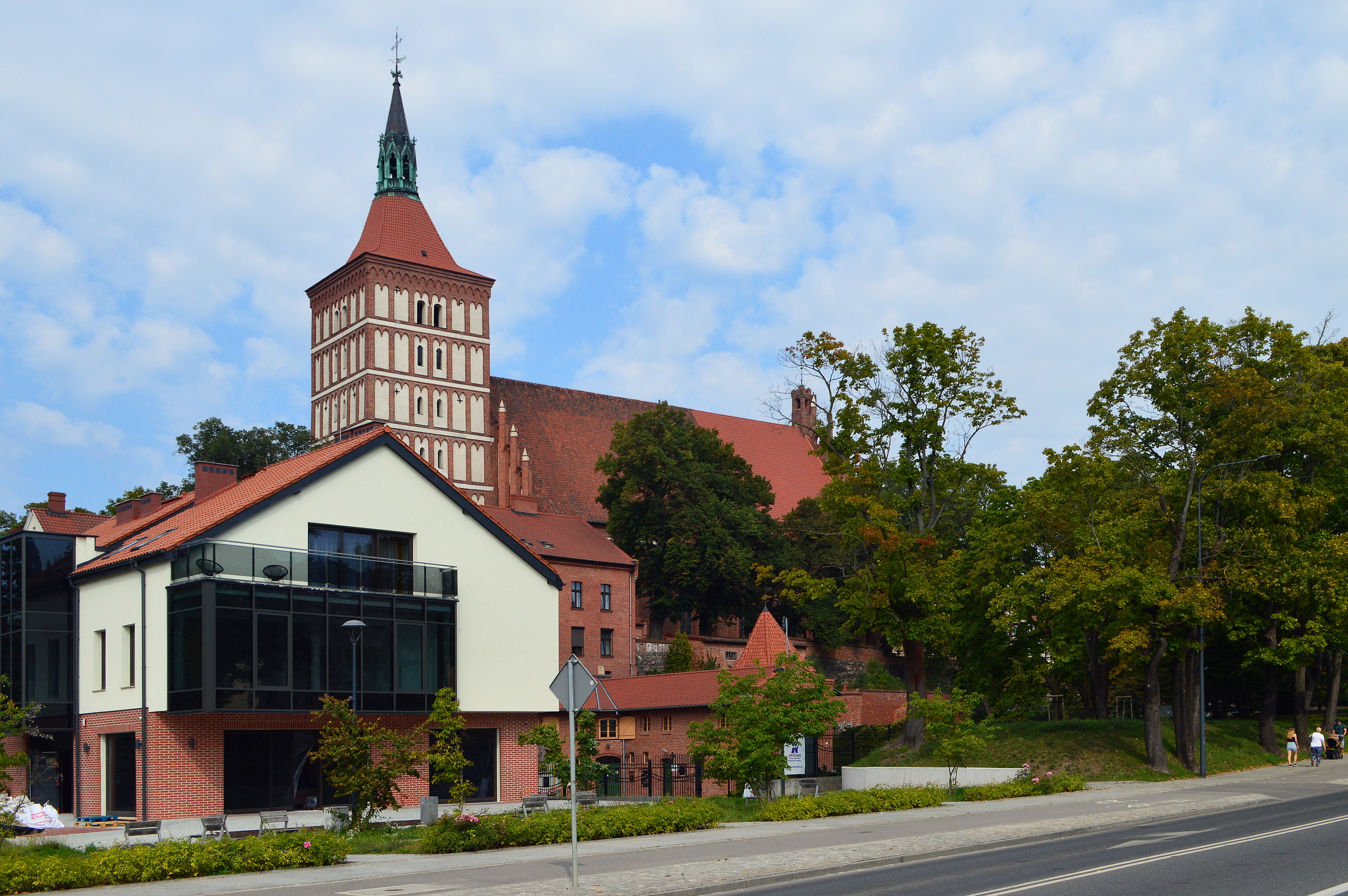
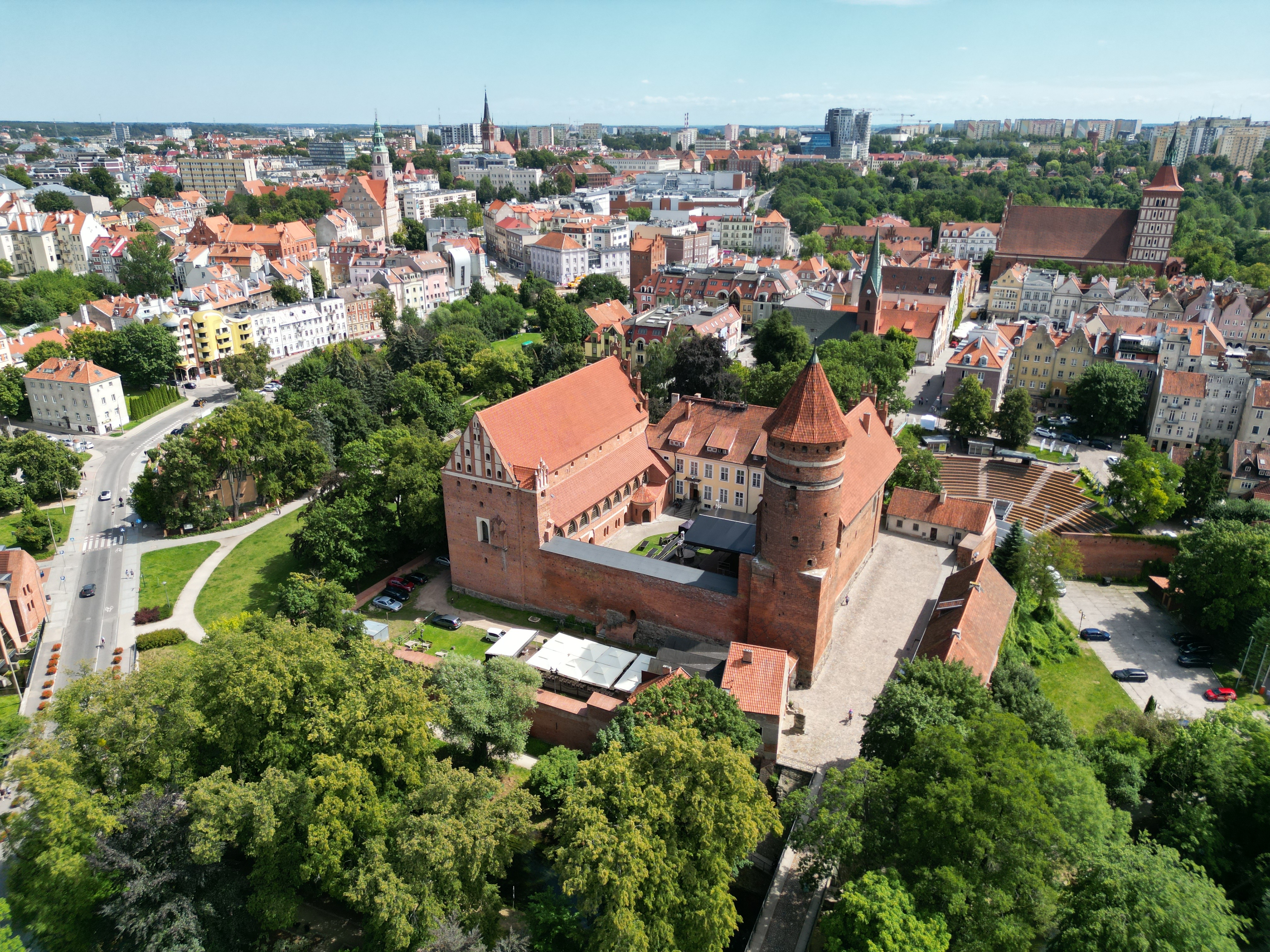
- City Hall Market Square Old Town Hall Copernicus Co-Cathedral Olsztyn Castle

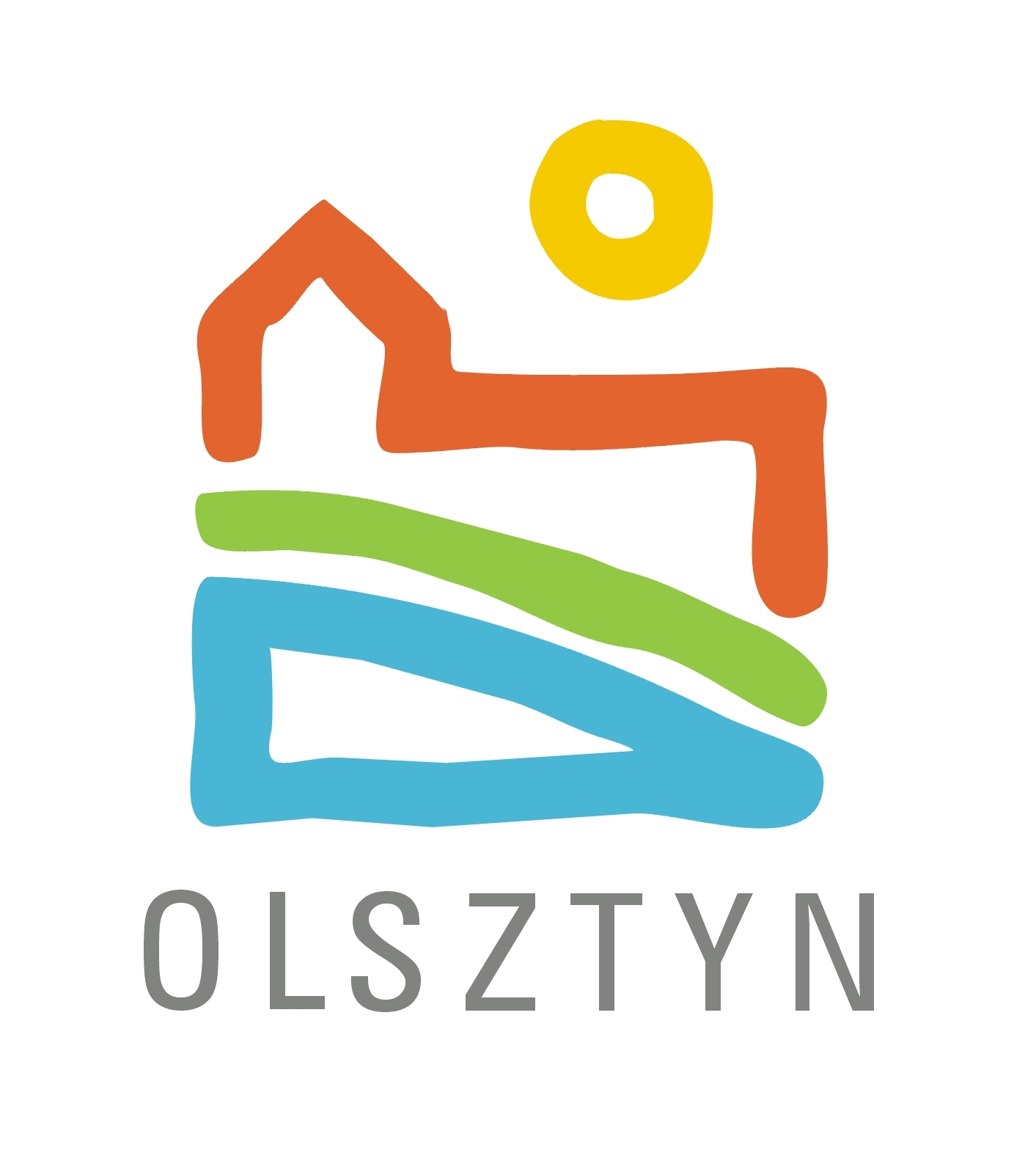
- Flag Coat of arms Brandmark
- Motto: Olsztyn – Miasto Młode Duchem… (Olsztyn – a city young in spirit…)
- Anthem: O Warmio moja miła
- Interactive map of Olsztyn
- Location within Poland
- Coordinates: 53°46′40″N 20°28′45″E
- Country: Poland
- Voivodeship: Warmian-Masurian
- County: city county
- Established: 14th century
- City rights: 1353

Government
  - City mayor: Robert Szewczyk (PO)

Area
  - Total: 88.328 km^{2} (34.104 sq mi)
- Highest elevation: 154 m (505 ft)
- Lowest elevation: 88 m (289 ft)

Population (31 December 2021)
  - Total: 169,793 ▼ (20th)
  - Density: 1,950/km^{2} (5,100/sq mi)
- Demonym(s): olsztynianin (male) olsztynianka (female) (pl)
- Time zone: UTC+1 (CET)
  - Summer (DST): UTC+2 (CEST)
- Postal code: 10-001 to 11–041
- Area code: +48 89
- Car plates: NO
- Climate: Dfb
- Primary airport: Olsztyn-Mazury Airport
- Website: www.olsztyn.eu

Olsztyn (UK: /ˈɒlʃtɪn/ OL-shtin, Polish: [ˈɔlʂtɨn]; German: Allenstein [ˈalənʃtaɪn]) (Note: Latin: Allenstenium or Holstin.) is a city on the Łyna River in northern Poland. It is the capital of the Warmian–Masurian Voivodeship, and is a city with county rights. The population of the city was estimated at 169,793 residents in 2021.

Olsztyn is the largest city in Warmia, and has been the capital of the voivodeship since 1999. In the same year, the University of Warmia and Masuria was founded from the fusion of three other local universities. The city is the seat of the Archbishop of the Roman Catholic Archdiocese of Warmia.

The most important sights of the city include the Old Town with the medieval Castle of Warmian Cathedral Chapter and St. James Co-cathedral, which dates back more than 600 years. The market square is part of the European Route of Brick Gothic and the co-cathedral is regarded as one of the greatest monuments of Gothic architecture in Poland. The city is also known for its association with Nicolaus Copernicus, who lived there and commanded the successful Polish defense of the city during a 1521 Teutonic invasion, with the castle containing an astronomical table made by Copernicus. Today, the castle houses a museum and is a venue for concerts, art exhibitions, film shows and other cultural events, which make Olsztyn a popular tourist destination.

Olsztyn has been ranked highly in quality of life, income, employment and safety. Based on multiple reports, it is one of the best places in Poland to live and work.

== History ==
=== Middle Ages ===
Historical affiliations

Teutonic Order 1353–1454
Kingdom of Poland 1454–1455
Teutonic Order 1455–1463
Kingdom of Poland 1463–1569
Polish–Lithuanian Commonwealth 1569–1772
Kingdom of Prussia 1772–1918
German Empire 1871–1918
Weimar Germany 1918–1933
Nazi Germany 1933–1945
People's Republic of Poland 1945–1989
Republic of Poland 1990–present

In 1334, a watchtower was established on the Łyna River. In 1346, the forest was cleared at the location for a new settlement, mentioned in a historical document from 1348. The following year, the Teutonic Knights began the construction of an Ordensburg (castle) as a stronghold against the Baltic Prussians. Allenstein was granted municipal rights by the cathedral chapter of the Bishopric of Warmia in October 1353. The German "Allenstein" referred to the river's Baltic Prussian name Alna, which meant a hind. Local Poles, having arrived along with German settlers, called it Holstin and Olsztyn, which are Polonizations of the German name. The castle was completed in 1397. The town was captured by the Kingdom of Poland during the Polish-Lithuanian-Teutonic War in 1410, and again in 1414 during the Hunger War, but it was returned to the monastic state of the Teutonic Knights after hostilities ended.

The city joined the Prussian Confederation in 1440, and rebelled against the Teutonic Knights in 1454 upon the outbreak of the Thirteen Years' War to join the Kingdom of Poland under King Casimir IV Jagiellon. In 1454, upon the request of the Confederation, King Casimir IV signed the act of incorporation of the region to Poland, and the townspeople took the castle and recognized the Polish king as the rightful ruler. Although the Teutonic Knights recaptured the city the following year, it was retaken by Polish troops in 1463. The Second Peace of Thorn in 1466 confirmed Allenstein as part of the Kingdom of Poland. Administratively it was located in the Prince-Bishopric of Warmia within the provinces of Royal Prussia and Greater Poland.

=== Early modern era ===
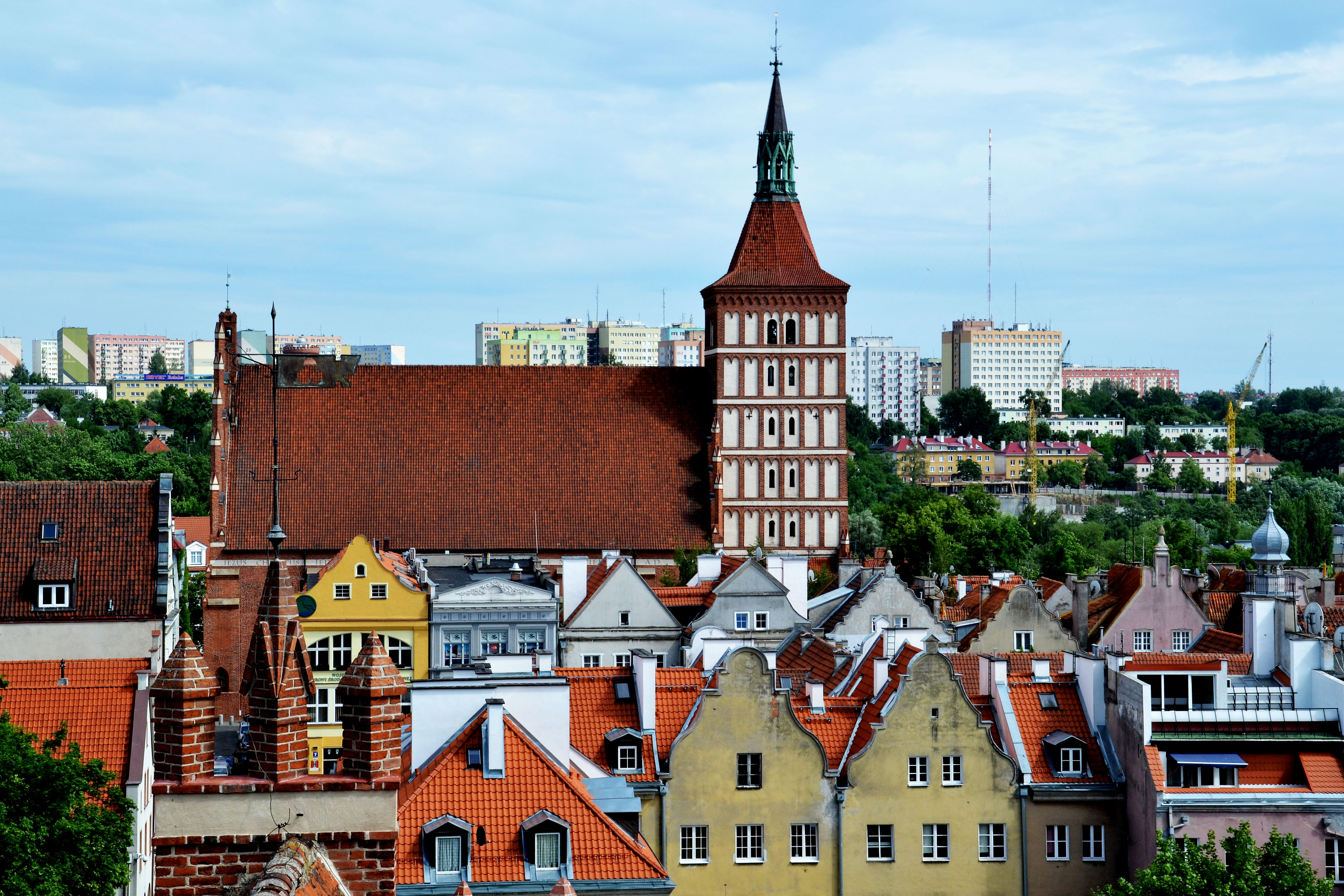
Saint James's Parish Church (now Pro-cathedral) in the Old Town, 2009

From 1516 to 1521, Nicolaus Copernicus lived in the town castle as an administrator and then in Mehlsack (Melzak, now Pieniężno). Copernicus was in charge of the Polish defences in the Siege of Allenstein during the Polish-Teutonic War of 1519–21. He also started and managed the repopulation of the region, inviting a new wave of Polish settlers from Mazovia. The town along with Warmia then entered what is considered the region's golden age, when crafts and trade developed, thanks also to the city's location on the Warsaw-Königsberg trade route. During this period, the city was still visited several times by Copernicus, as well as leading figures of the Polish Renaissance, writers, royal secretaries and diplomats: Johannes Dantiscus, called the "father of Polish diplomacy", and Marcin Kromer, who was also a historian and music theorist. St. James' Pro-Cathedral, one of the most distinctive landmarks of the cityscape, was completed at that time.

Prosperity was halted in the 1620s, when the town suffered a fire and an epidemic. In 1626, during the Swedish invasion, clerics from Frauenburg (Frombork) took refuge in the town, which the Swedes did not reach. The city was sacked by Swedish troops later, in 1655 and 1708, during the next Polish-Swedish wars, and its population was nearly wiped out in 1710 by epidemics of the bubonic plague and cholera.

The town became part of the Kingdom of Prussia in 1772 after the First Partition of Poland and its economy initially collapsed. Poles became subject to extensive Germanisation policies. A Prussian census recorded a population of 1,770 people, predominantly farmers, and Allenstein was administered within the newly created Province of East Prussia.

=== Late modern era ===
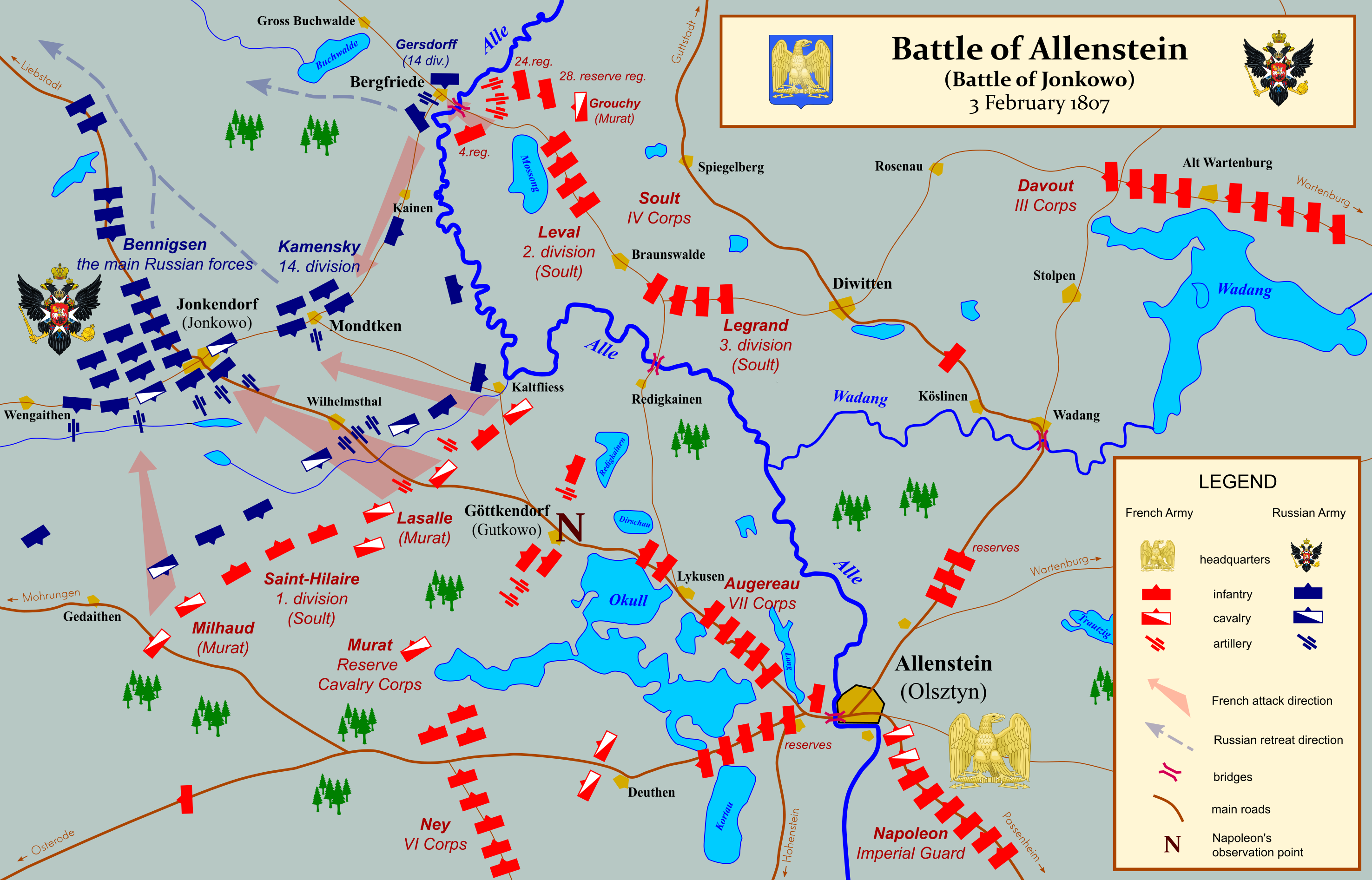
Battle of Allenstein (Olsztyn), February 3, 1807

On February 3, 1807, the Battle of Allenstein took place. The French Army clashed with the Imperial Russian army. On that day, Allenstein was visited by Napoleon Bonaparte. Napoleon gathered enormous forces in the city and planned to engage the Russians and Prussians in a decisive battle. The Russian army was stationed in Jonkowo, but retreated after the French attack. Thanks to the victory at Allenstein, Napoleon's army was able to move north and a few days later the general Battle of Eylau took place.

The growth of the city started again after it became a district seat in 1818, a significant influx of German settlers began and by 1825, the town was inhabited by 1,341 Germans and 1,266 Poles. In the early 1830s the city suffered from a cholera epidemic and a hunger crisis, however afterwards it flourished again, when despite Germanisation policies it was administered by Polish mayor Jakub Rarkowski from 1836 to 1865. Under Rarkowski the city was expanded and modernized, and the mayor also hid Polish insurgents in the city during the January Uprising. The first German-language newspaper, the Allensteiner Zeitung, began publishing in 1841. Polish historian Wojciech Kętrzyński was arrested in Jomendorf (the present-day district of Jaroty), and imprisoned in the city's High Gate in 1863 for smuggling weapons for the Polish January Uprising in the Russian Partition of Poland. The town hospital was founded in 1867.

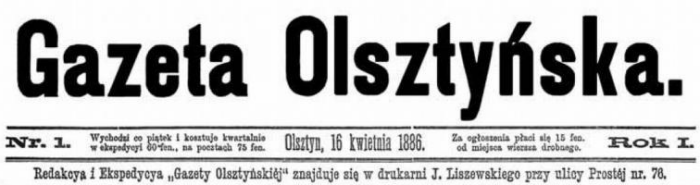
Headline of the first issue of Gazeta Olsztyńska from 1886

In 1871, with the unification of Germany, Allenstein became part of the German Empire. Two years later, the city was connected by railway to Thorn (Toruń). Despite Germanisation attempts the city remained an important Polish centre. Its first Polish language newspaper, the Gazeta Olsztyńska, was founded in 1886. Further Polish newspapers, Nowiny Warmińskie and Warmiak, were founded in 1890 and 1893, respectively. Allenstein's infrastructure developed rapidly: gas was installed in 1890, telephones in 1892, public water supply in 1898, and electricity in 1907. The Provincial Mental Sanatorium Kortau was established in 1886 just south of Allenstein (today part of Olsztyn-Kortowo). In 1905, the city became the capital of Regierungsbezirk Allenstein, a government administrative region in East Prussia. From 1818 to 1910, the city was administered within the East Prussian Allenstein District, after which it became an independent city.

=== World War I, interbellum and World War II ===
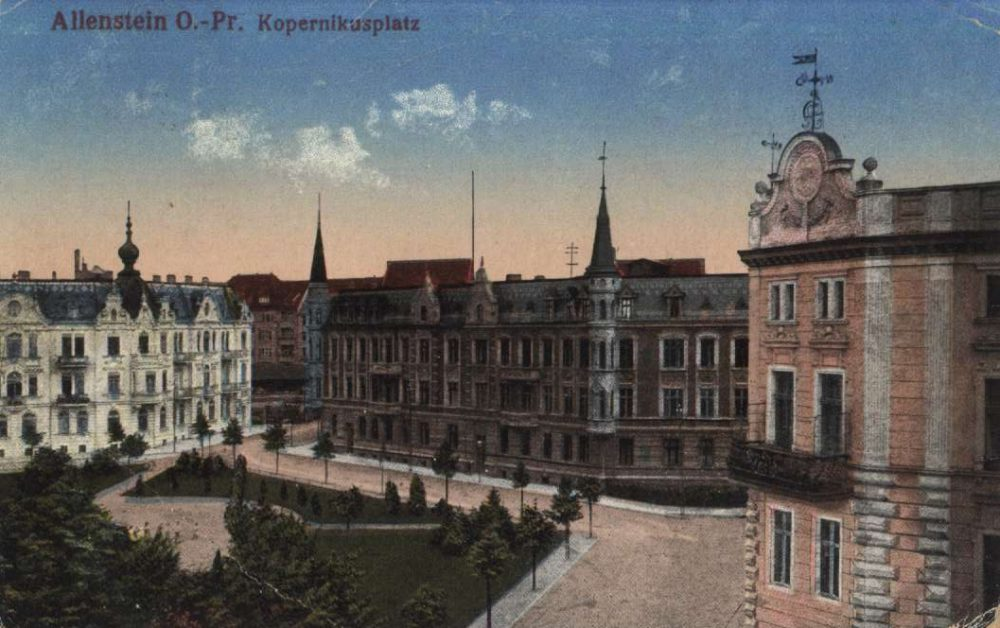
Kopernikusplatz (postcard, 1917)

Shortly after the outbreak of World War I in 1914, Russian troops captured Allenstein, but it was recovered by the Imperial German Army in the Battle of Tannenberg.

After the defeat of Germany in World War I, the East Prussian plebiscite was held in 1920 to determine whether the populace of the region, including Allenstein, wished to remain in German East Prussia or become part of Poland, which had just regained independence. In order to advertise the plebiscite, special postage stamps were produced by overprinting German stamps and sold on 3 April of that year. One kind of overprint read PLÉBISCITE / OLSZTYN / ALLENSTEIN, while the other read TRAITÉ / DE / VERSAILLES / ART. 94 et 95 inside an oval whose border gave the full name of the plebiscite commission. Each overprint was applied to 14 denominations ranging from 5 Pfennigs to 3 Marks. The Polish community faced discrimination, Polish rallies were dispersed, the participants were threatened and beaten. In March, Polish activist Bogumił Linka died in Allenstein, a few weeks after being attacked by the German militia in nearby Szczytno in Masuria. He was buried in Allenstein, however, his grave was soon devastated by local German nationalists. A monument to Linka was unveiled after Poland regained control of the city after World War II. The presence of a Royal Irish battalion ensured a relative peace in Allenstein. The plebiscite, held on 11 July, produced 16,742 votes for Germany and 342 votes for Poland.

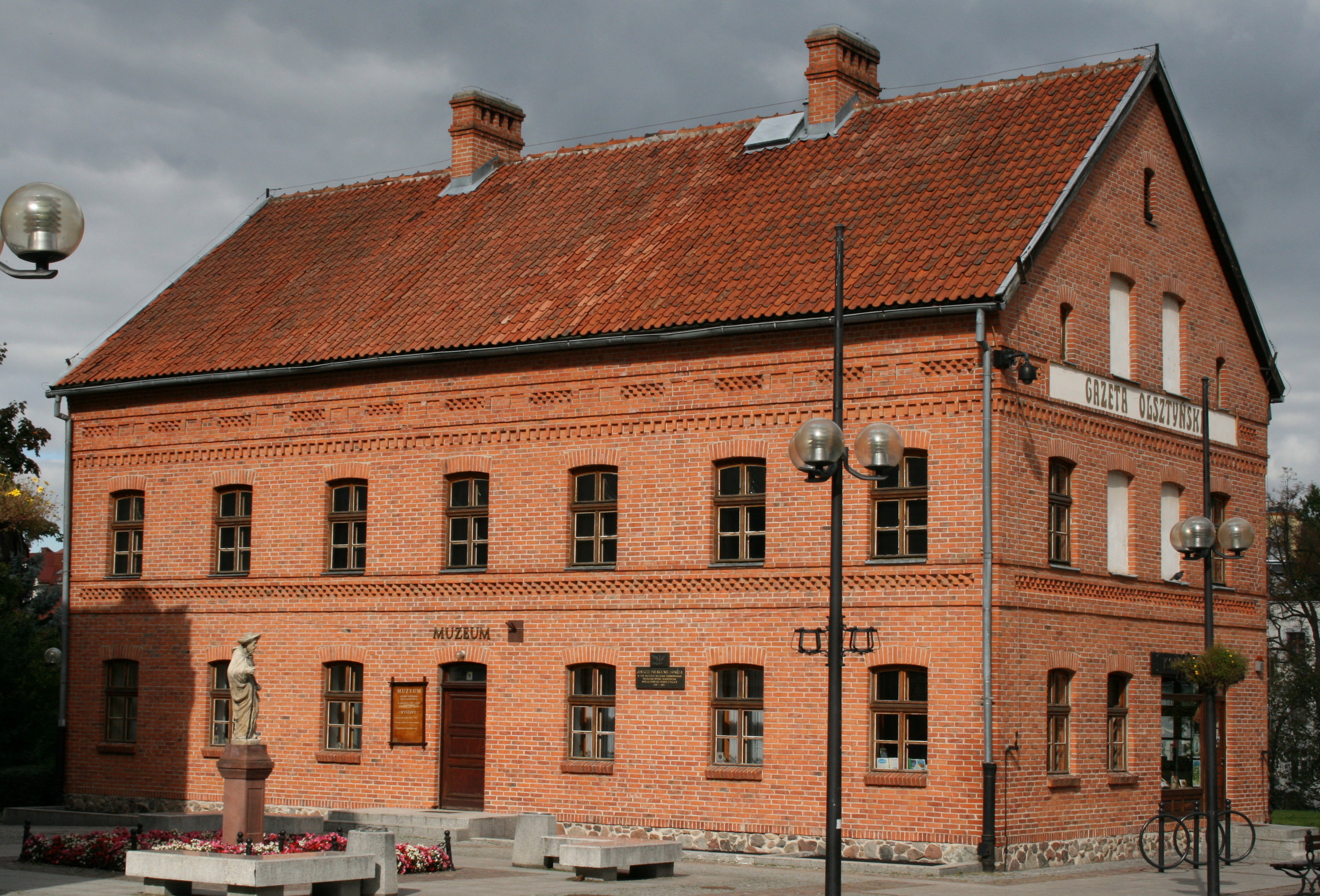
Pre-war headquarters of Gazeta Olsztyńska, now a museum

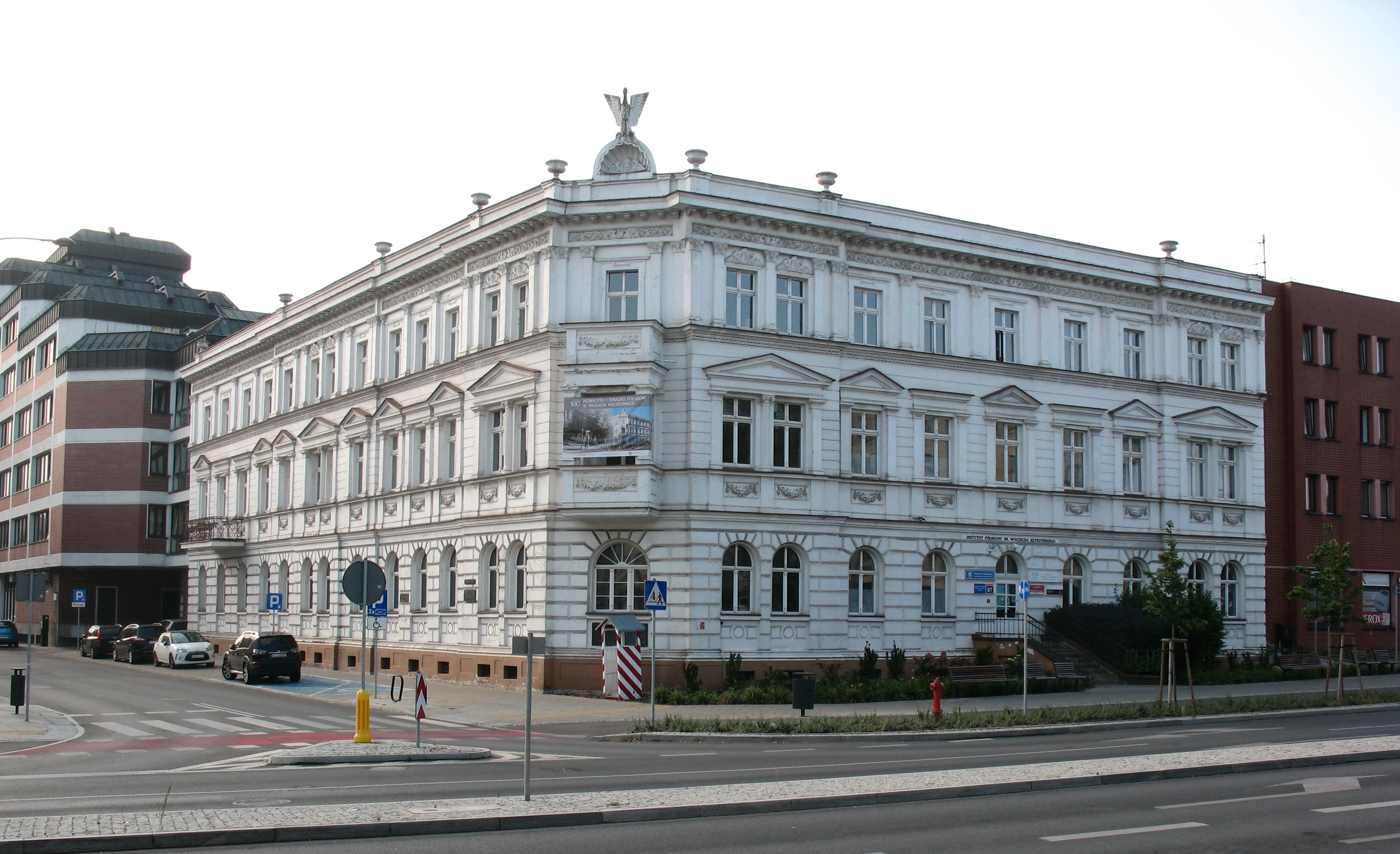
Headquarters of various Polish organizations in the interbellum, now a research institute

In the interwar period, numerous Polish organisations operated in the city, including the Polish Scouting and Guiding Association, Union of Poles in Germany, a People's Bank (Bank Ludowy), local Poles organised a school, library, puppet theatre. The Polish Consulate also operated. Apart from Gazeta Olsztyńska, new Polish newspapers were issued in the city, i.e. the youth magazine Życie Młodzieży. Dwutygodnik młodzieży polskiej w Niemczech from 1924, and the Mazurski Przyjaciel Ludu and Mazur newspapers dedicated to the nearby region of Masuria in 1923–1928 and 1928–1939, respectively. As a result of pro-Polish publications, the Mazur newspaper was suspended twice in 1933, its editors were twice fined by German courts, and the German administration threatened to close it down on several occasions. After the January 1933 Nazi seizure of power in Germany, Poles and Jews in Allenstein were increasingly persecuted. In 1935, the German Wehrmacht made the city the seat of the Allenstein Militärischer Bereich. It was then home of the 11th and 217th infantry divisions and 11th Artillery Regiment. At the same time, the football club SV Hindenburg Allenstein played in Allenstein from 1921 to 1945.

Beginning in 1936, members of the Polish minority were increasingly persecuted, especially members of the Union of Poles in Germany. In early 1939, many local Polish activists were expelled. In an attempt to rig the results of an upcoming census and understate the number of Poles in the city and region, the Germans terrorized the Polish population and, in May 1939, the Gestapo confiscated 10,000 Polish information leaflets in the headquarters of the Gazeta Olsztyńska. In August 1939, Germany introduced martial law in the region, which allowed for even more blatant persecution of Poles. In August and September 1939, the authorities carried out mass arrests of local Poles, including the chairman of the local Polish bank and his assistant, the chief of the "Rolnik" Cooperative, and the principal of the local Polish school.

Nazi Germany co-formed the Einsatzgruppe V in the city, which then entered several Polish cities and towns, including Grudziądz, Mława, Ciechanów, Łomża and Siedlce, to commit various atrocities against Poles during the German invasion of Poland that began World War II in 1939. German troops invaded Poland also from Olsztyn (then called Allenstein). After the German invasion of Poland, local Poles were also subjected to mass executions and deportations to occupied Poland. Arrested Poles were held in a local prison and then forced to remove Polish signs and inscriptions in the city, while the German population gathered and insulted them. The Gazeta Olsztyńska and Mazur were abolished by the German authorities, the newspaper's headquarters was demolished and the editor-in-chief Seweryn Pieniężny was arrested and executed in the Hohenbruch concentration camp along with co-publisher Wojciech Gałęziewski and the "Rolnik" Cooperative chief Leon Włodarczyk, while Pieniężny's wife was deported to the Ravensbrück concentration camp. The last pre-war Polish consul in Allenstein, Bohdan Jałowiecki, along with the consulate staff, was imprisoned in the Hohenbruch and Soldau concentration camps, and then murdered. Polish teachers were deported to the Dachau concentration camp.

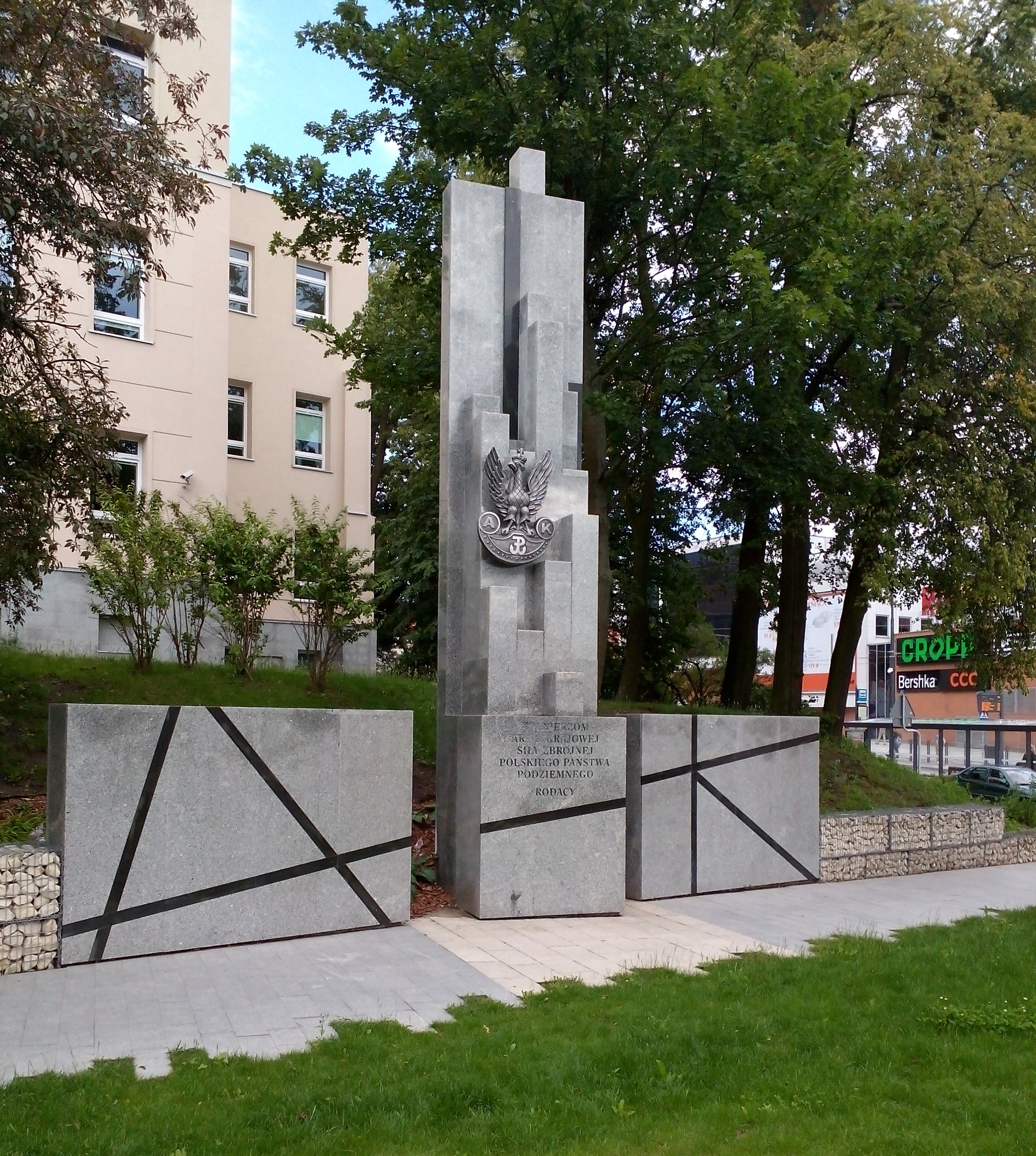
Home Army monument

During the war five forced labour camps were established in the city. On 12 October 1939, the Wehrmacht established an area headquarters for one of its military districts, Wehrkreis I (headquartered at Königsberg), that controlled the environs of Allenstein, including Lötzen (now Giżycko), and Ciechanów in occupied Poland. As part of the Aktion T4, Nazi Germany conducted medical experiments on the patients of the psychiatric hospital in the present-day district of Kortowo, in which at least 5,000 people were killed.

On 22 January 1945, near the end of the war, the city was plundered and burned by the conquering Soviet Red Army, and much of its German population fled. The remaining, mostly Polish population, was subjected to various crimes, including murder, rape and looting. The Soviets also murdered the remaining patients and staff of the psychiatric hospital, who were either burned alive or shot. Remains of three Roman Catholic nuns who served as nurses at Olsztyn's St. Mary's Hospital and were killed by Soviet soldiers in 1945 were excavated in October 2020.

On 23 May 1945, the Soviets established a Polish administration in the region which aroused British and American protest. The Polish rule was accepted under the preliminary provisions of the Potsdam Conference. In October 1945, the remaining German population was expelled. The remaining Poles were joined by new Polish settlers, mostly those expelled from pre-war Polish regions of Vilnius, Grodno and Volhynia, annexed by the Soviet Union, as well as settlers from Warsaw, which had been destroyed by German forces during World War II. Reconstruction and removal of damage lasted until the 1950s.

=== Contemporary history ===
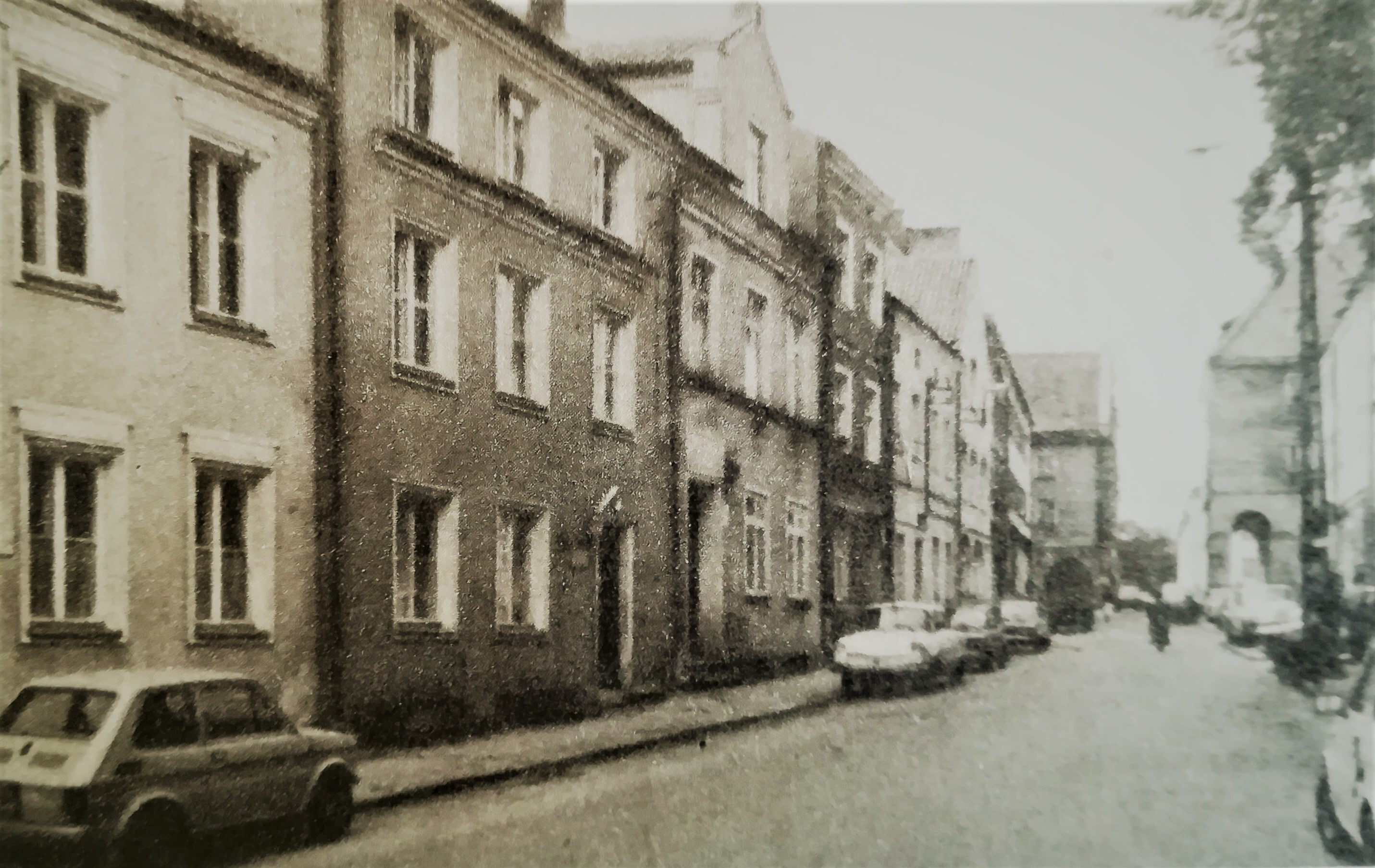
Olsztyn in 1986

In December 1945, a match factory was launched in Olsztyn, as the city's first post-war industrial plant of national importance. A tyre factory was founded in Olsztyn in 1967. Its subsequent names included OZOS, Stomil and Michelin. City limits were greatly expanded in 1966 and 1987.

In 1956, Olsztyn was the site of the largest Polish demonstration of support for the Hungarian Revolution of 1956. On the 500th anniversary of the birth of Nicolaus Copernicus, in 1973, a planetarium was opened in Olsztyn. In 1989 the former Gazeta Olsztyńska headquarters was rebuilt and re-opened as a museum. In 1991 Pope John Paul II visited the city. In 1999 the University of Warmia and Mazury in Olsztyn was established, which is now one of the largest universities in northeastern Poland.

Olsztyn became the capital of the Warmian-Masurian Voivodeship in 1999. It was previously in the Olsztyn Voivodeship.

=== Olsztyn Castle ===
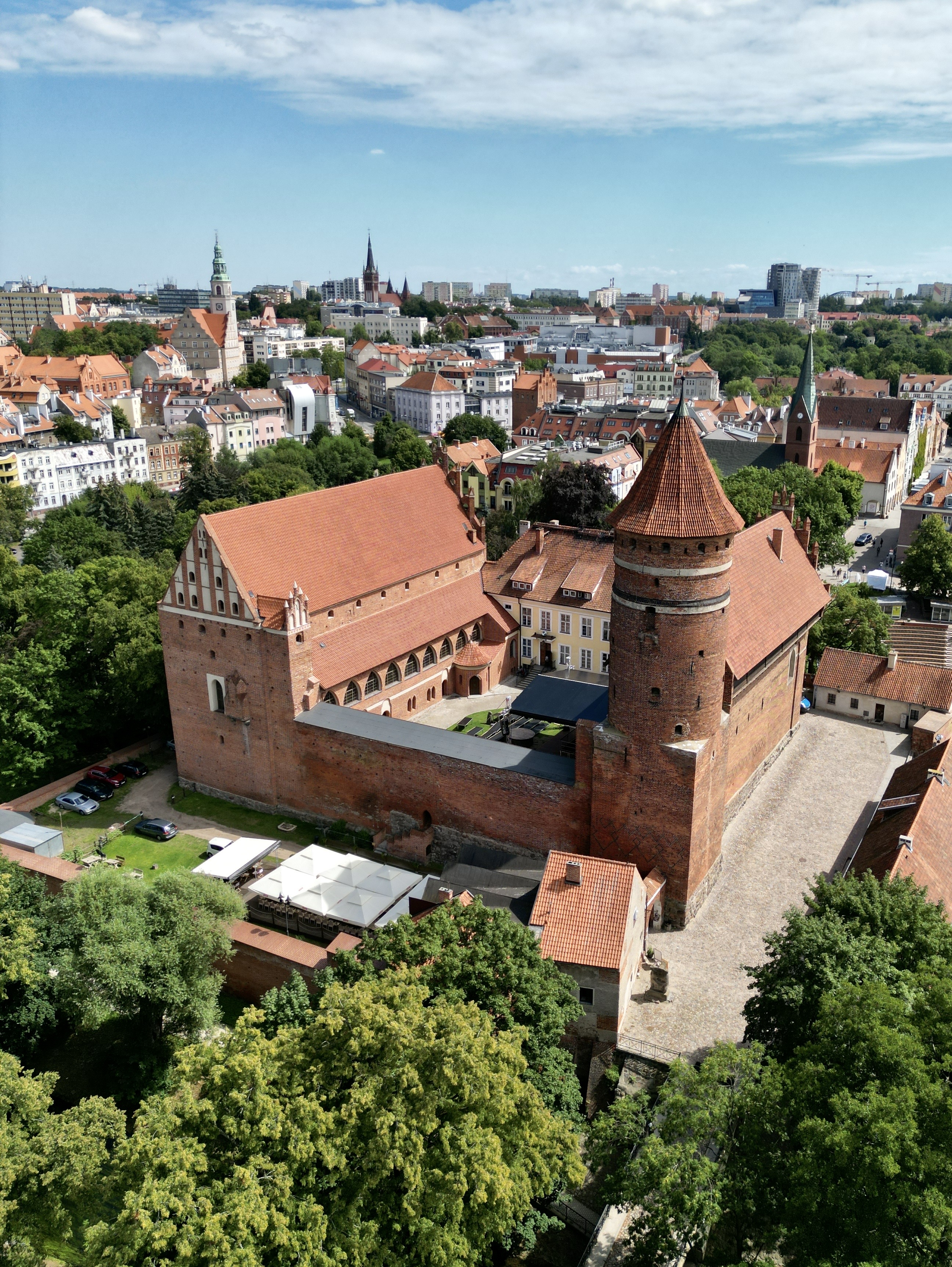
Olsztyn Castle

The Olsztyn Castle was built between 1346–1353 and by then it had one wing on the north-east side of the rectangular courtyard. Access to the castle leads from the drawbridge over the river Łyna, surrounded by a belt of defensive walls and a moat. The south-west wing of the castle was built in the 15th century, the tower situated in the west corner of the courtyard, from the middle of the 14th century, was rebuilt in the early 16th century and had a round shape on a square base and was 40 meters high. At the same time, the castle walls were raised to a height of 12 meters and a second belt of the lower walls was built. The castle walls were partly combined with city walls, which made the castle look as if it had been a powerful bastion defending access to the city. The castle was owned by Warmia Chapter, which until 1454, together with the Prince-Bishopric of Warmia, was under the military protection of the Teutonic Knights and their Monastic State in Prussia.

The castle had played a huge role in the Polish-Teutonic wars by then. After the Battle of Grunwald in 1410, the Poles took it after a few days siege. In the Thirteen Years' War (1454–66) it was jumping from rule to rule. The Knights threatened the castle and the town in 1521, but the defense was very effective. They contained one failed assault. There is a connection between the history of the castle, the city of Olsztyn, and Nicolaus Copernicus. He prepared the defense of Olsztyn against the invasion of the Teutonic Knights in 1520.

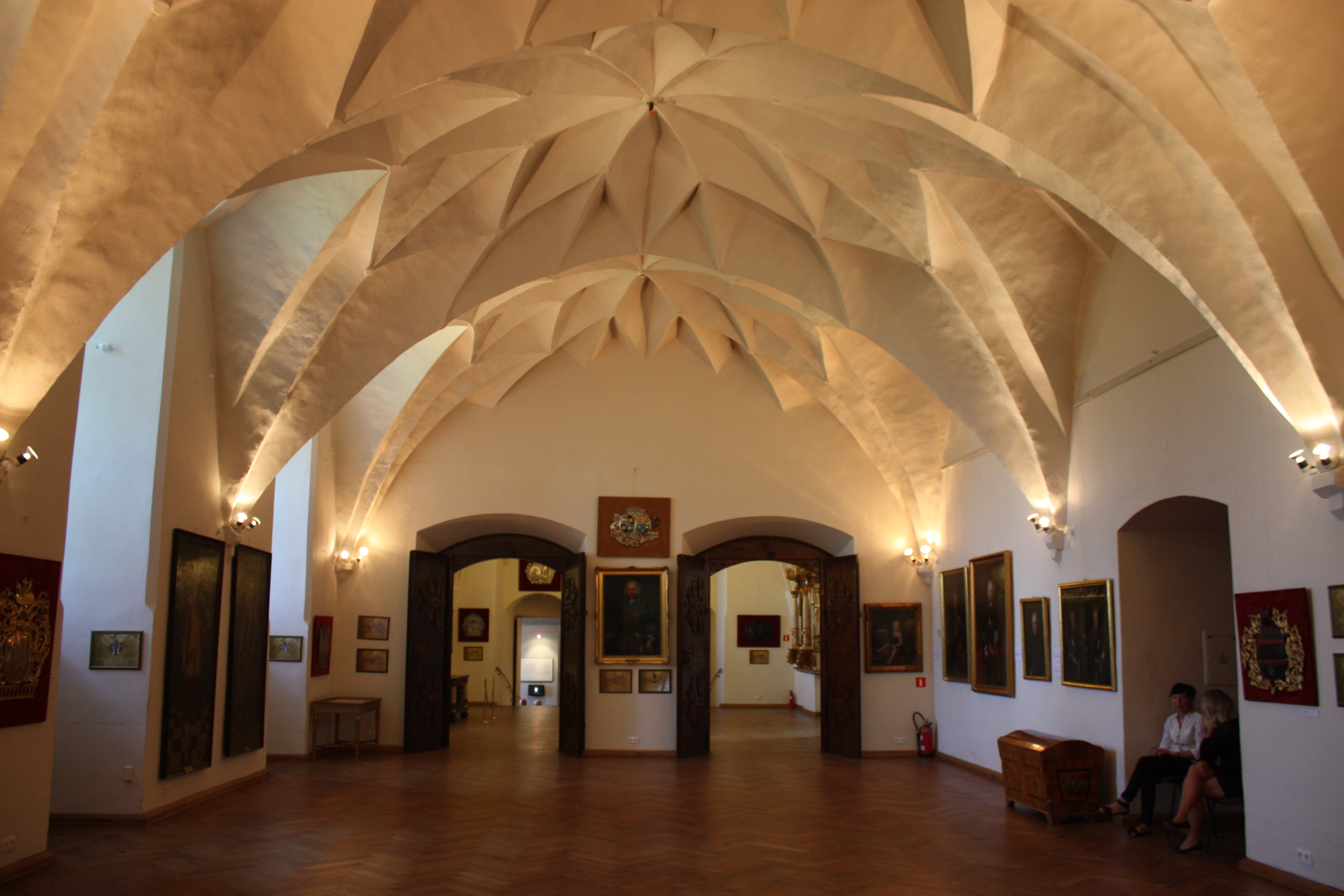
Interior of the Olsztyn Castle

In the sixteenth century, there were two prince-bishops of Warmia that stayed there: Johannes Dantiscus – the first Sarmatian poet, endowed with the imperial laurel wreath for "Latin Songs" (1538, 1541) and Marcin Kromer, who wrote with equal ease in Latin and Polish scientific and literary works (1580). Kromer consecrated the chapel of St. Anna, which was built in the south-west wing of the castle. In the course of time, both wings of the castle lost military importance, which for residential purposes has become very convenient. In 1779, Prince-Bishop Ignacy Krasicki stopped here as well.

After the Prussian annexation of Warmia during the First Partition of Poland in 1772, the castle became the property of the state board of estates (Kriegs- und Domänenkammer – War and Domain Chamber). In 1845, the bridge over the moat was replaced by a causeway better connecting the castle with the city. In 1901–1911 a general renovation of the castle was performed, however, several sections of the building were violated at the same time where they changed the original look of the castle e.g. putting on window frames in a cloister. The tower was topped off in 1921 and again in 1926.

In 1945, the whole castle became home to the Masurian Museum, which today is called the Museum of Warmia and Masuria. In addition, there are also popular events held within the frameworks of the Olsztyn Artistic Summer and so-called "evenings of the castle" and "Sundays in the Museum".

=== Jewish community ===
Although Jews were permitted to trade in the city itself and its fairs during the medieval times, they were restricted from trading freely in the villages surrounding the town. In 1718, Bishop Teodor Andrzej Potocki imposed a ban on Jewish trade in the city as well. The ban, even if continued by successive bishops, proved not to be particularly successful in the light of repeated complaints by the local merchants about Jewish dealing in animal leather and similar products as the one recorded in 1742. Permanent Jewish settlement can be dated to 1780 when the Jews were finally permitted to settle in the city albeit outside the immediate city walls. In 1814, the Simonson brothers opened the first Jewish store. Yet the growth of the Jewish community worried city authorities, who tried to curb it with restrictions and punitive measures. In 1850, a new law imposed fines and imprisonment on anyone who harboured a "wandering" Jew in their home.

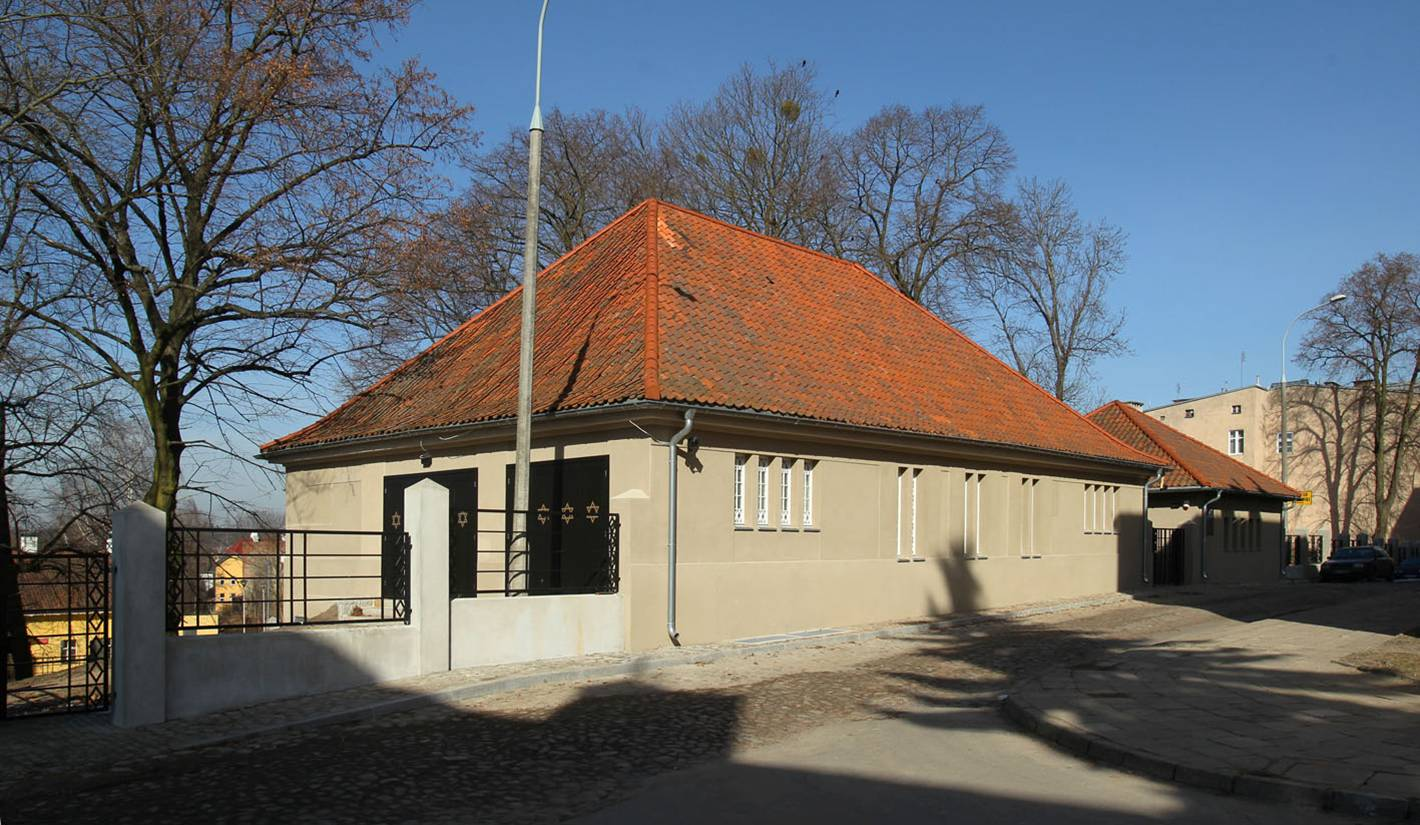
Former Jewish Tahara house

The roots of the Jewish congregation in the town can be traced to 1820. Shortly after that date, an official prayer room was established on Richterstraße. In 1877, the congregation bought a plot of land on Liebstädterstraße and built a synagogue there. A Jewish cemetery was built on Seestraße (present-day Grunwaldzka). At its peak, the town's Jewish population reached 448 people (1933).

During the Kristallnacht, the town synagogue was destroyed by Nazi Germans, only to be later used as a bomb shelter. Today, the site of the former synagogue is occupied by a local sports club.

By 1939, only 135 Jews were left in the city. The remainder fled the country. Those who still lived in the town by 1940 were deported to Nazi concentration camps. In June 1946, 16 Holocaust survivors settled in the city and in 1948, the congregation had 190 worshipers. Most of them emigrated to Israel throughout the next few decades. There is no trace of the Jewish cemetery.

The city was the birthplace of world-famous Jewish architect Erich Mendelsohn. In town, Mendelsohn planned the mourners' chapel (called the Mendelsohn house) next to the cemetery. The building is restored. In addition, it was the birthplace of German Socialist and SPD leader Hugo Haase. Frieda Strohmberg, an Impressionist, lived and worked in the city from 1910 to 1927. Documentation of the Jewish owned shops in town exists.

== Geography ==
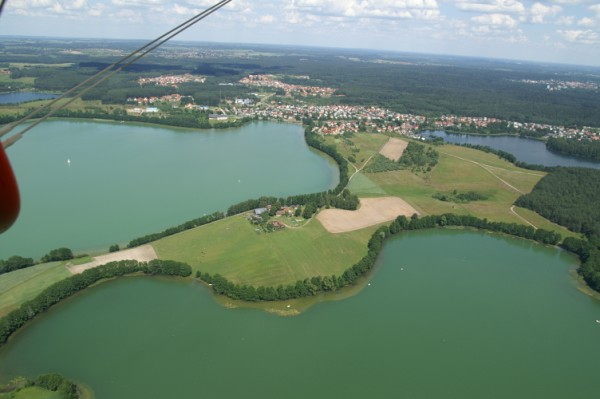
Lake Ukiel (Krzywe)

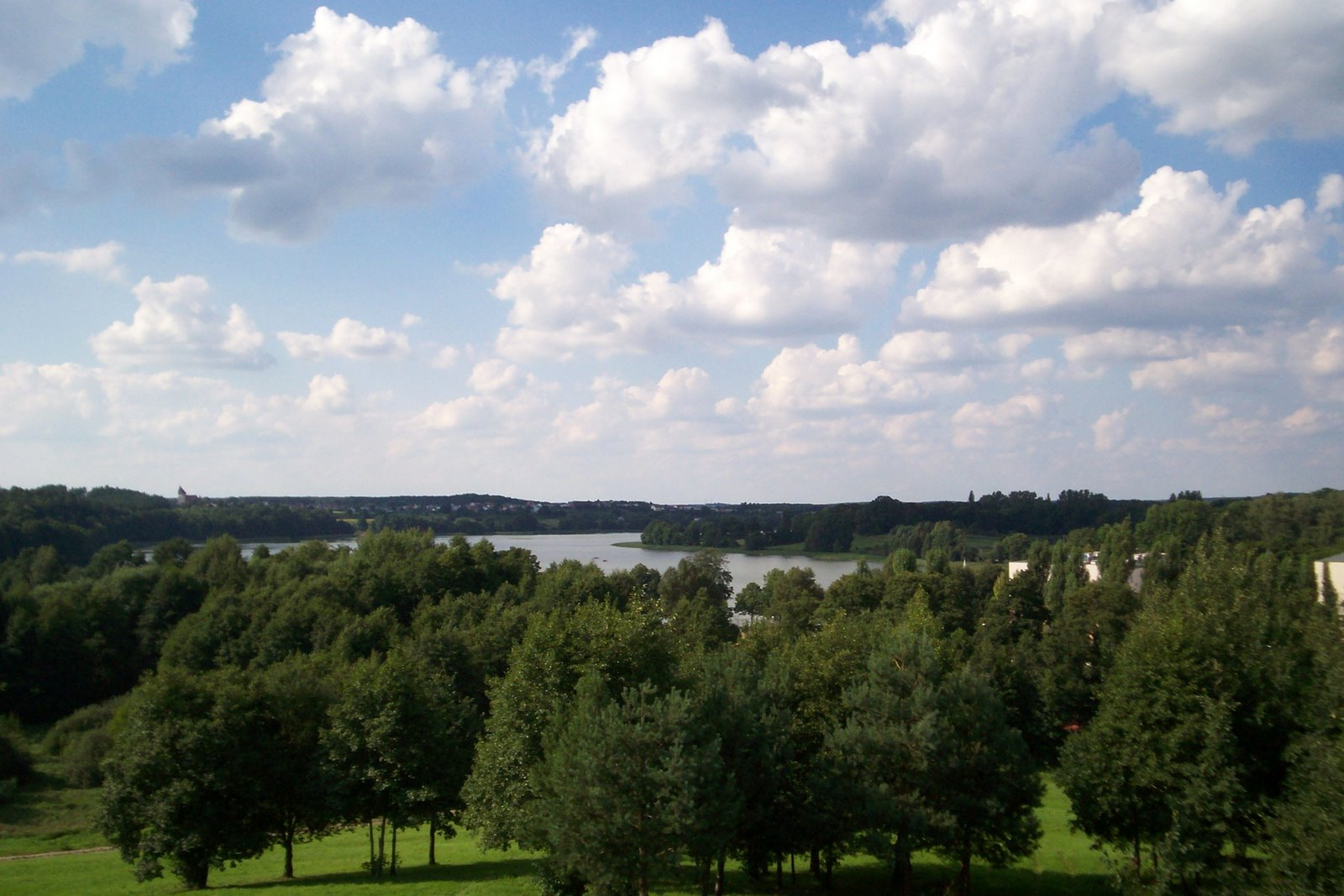
Lake Kortowskie

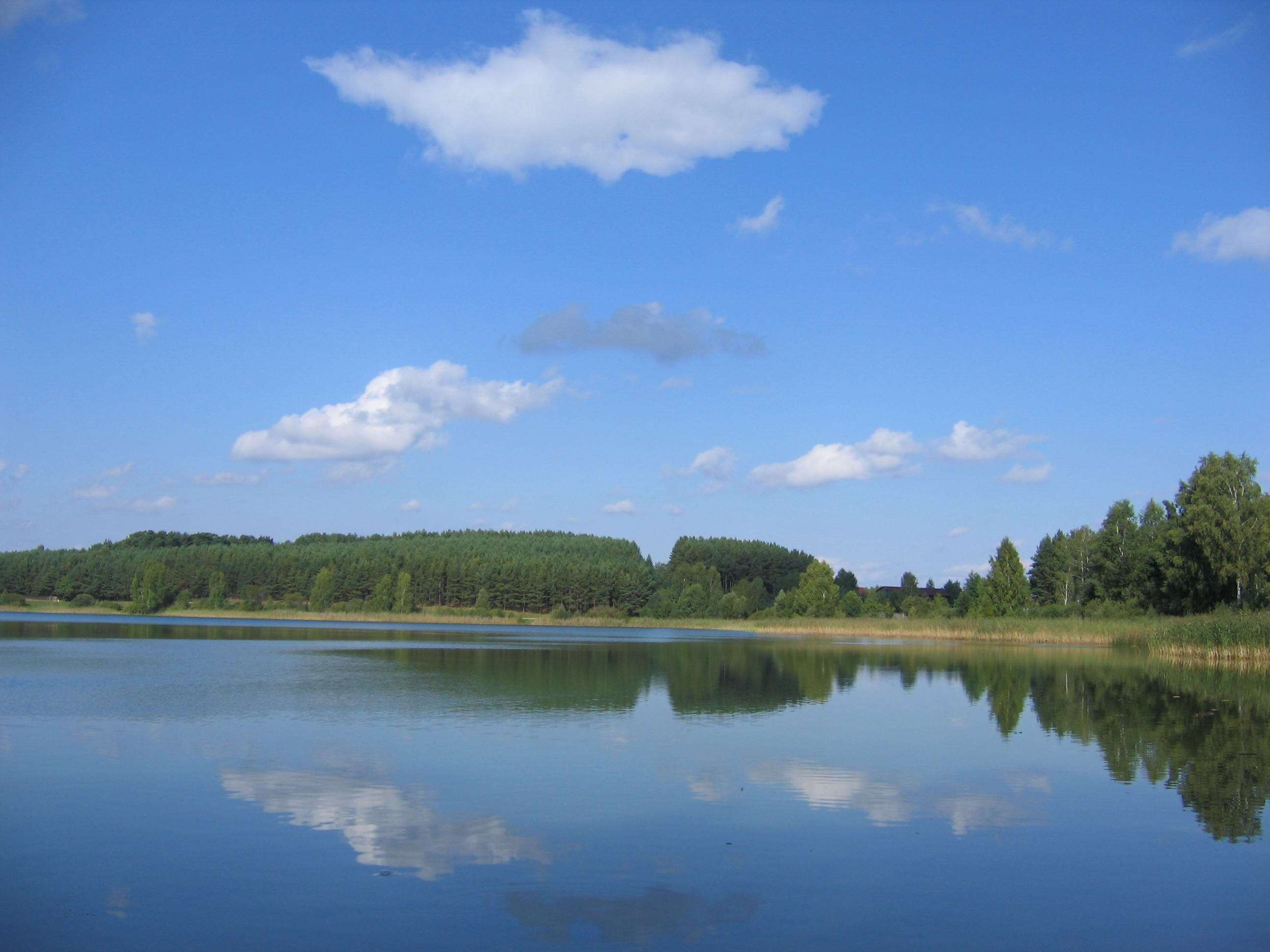
Lake Tyrsko (Żbik)

Olsztyn is located in the north-east part of Poland in the region known as the "Thousand Lakes".

=== Greenbelt ===
More than half of the forests occupying 21.2% of the city area form a single complex of the Municipal Forest (1050 ha) used mainly for recreation and tourism purposes. Within the Municipal Forest area are situated two peat-land flora sanctuaries, Mszar and Redykajny. Municipal greenery (560 ha, 6.5% of the town area) developed in the form of numerous parks, green spots and three cemeteries over a century old. The greenery includes 910 monuments of nature and groups of protected trees in the form of beech, oak, maple and lime-lined avenues.

=== Lakes ===
The city is situated in a lake region of forests and plains. There are 15 lakes inside the administrative bounds of the city (13 with areas greater than 1 ha). The overall area of lakes in Olsztyn is about 725 ha, which constitutes 8.25% of the total city area.

Lake	Area (ha)	Maximum depth (m)
Lake Ukiel (a.k.a. Jezioro Krzywe)	412	43
Lake Kortowskie	89.7	17.2
Lake Track (a.k.a. Trackie)	52.8	4.6
Lake Skanda	51.5	12
Lake Redykajny	29.9	20.6
Lake Długie	26.8	17.2
Lake Sukiel	20.8	25
Lake Tyrsko (a.k.a. Żbik or Duży Żbik)	18.6	30.6
Lake Stary Dwór	6.0	23.3
Lake Siginek	6.0	insufficient data
Lake Czarne	approximately 1.3	insufficient data
Lake Żbik (a.k.a. Mały Żbik)	approximately 1.2	insufficient data
Lake Pereszkowo	approximately 1.2	insufficient data
Lake Mummel	approximately 0.3	insufficient data
Lake Modrzewiowe	0.25	insufficient data

=== Climate ===
Olsztyn has an oceanic climate (Köppen climate classification: Cfb) using the −3 °C (27 °F) isotherm or a humid continental climate (Köppen climate classification: Dfb) using the 0 °C (32 °F) isotherm.

Climate data for Olsztyn (1991–2020 normals, extremes 1951–present)
Month	Jan	Feb	Mar	Apr	May	Jun	Jul	Aug	Sep	Oct	Nov	Dec	Year
Record high °C (°F)	12.2 (54.0)	16.7 (62.1)	23.9 (75.0)	30.2 (86.4)	31.5 (88.7)	33.7 (92.7)	36.1 (97.0)	36.2 (97.2)	34.6 (94.3)	25.9 (78.6)	17.8 (64.0)	13.2 (55.8)	36.2 (97.2)
Mean daily maximum °C (°F)	0.4 (32.7)	1.8 (35.2)	6.2 (43.2)	13.3 (55.9)	18.6 (65.5)	21.7 (71.1)	23.8 (74.8)	23.4 (74.1)	18.1 (64.6)	11.8 (53.2)	5.5 (41.9)	1.7 (35.1)	12.2 (54.0)
Daily mean °C (°F)	−2.0 (28.4)	−1.1 (30.0)	2.2 (36.0)	7.9 (46.2)	12.9 (55.2)	16.1 (61.0)	18.3 (64.9)	17.8 (64.0)	13.2 (55.8)	8.0 (46.4)	3.3 (37.9)	−0.4 (31.3)	8.0 (46.4)
Mean daily minimum °C (°F)	−4.4 (24.1)	−3.8 (25.2)	−1.5 (29.3)	2.6 (36.7)	7.1 (44.8)	10.7 (51.3)	13.2 (55.8)	12.7 (54.9)	8.9 (48.0)	4.8 (40.6)	1.2 (34.2)	−2.6 (27.3)	4.1 (39.4)
Record low °C (°F)	−30.6 (−23.1)	−30.6 (−23.1)	−23.5 (−10.3)	−9.7 (14.5)	−4.8 (23.4)	−0.5 (31.1)	4.0 (39.2)	1.9 (35.4)	−4.2 (24.4)	−11.0 (12.2)	−20.2 (−4.4)	−26.0 (−14.8)	−30.6 (−23.1)
Average precipitation mm (inches)	42.1 (1.66)	33.1 (1.30)	39.4 (1.55)	37.5 (1.48)	59.8 (2.35)	70.1 (2.76)	88.0 (3.46)	63.8 (2.51)	58.5 (2.30)	57.7 (2.27)	47.0 (1.85)	45.4 (1.79)	642.4 (25.29)
Average extreme snow depth cm (inches)	9.5 (3.7)	9.7 (3.8)	6.5 (2.6)	1.7 (0.7)	0.0 (0.0)	0.0 (0.0)	0.0 (0.0)	0.0 (0.0)	0.0 (0.0)	0.8 (0.3)	3.2 (1.3)	6.2 (2.4)	9.7 (3.8)
Average precipitation days (≥ 0.1 mm)	17.37	15.00	14.13	12.40	13.50	14.30	14.43	13.33	13.03	14.13	15.57	17.63	174.84
Average snowy days (≥ 0 cm)	18.4	17.6	9.6	1.3	0.0	0.0	0.0	0.0	0.0	0.5	4.1	12.5	64.0
Average relative humidity (%)	88.2	85.0	77.6	69.9	70.4	72.6	74.7	75.3	80.7	84.7	89.7	89.8	79.9
Source 1: Institute of Meteorology and Water Management
Source 2: Meteomodel.pl (records, relative humidity 1991–2020)

== Administrative division ==
Districts of Olsztyn

Aerial views of various districts of Olsztyn

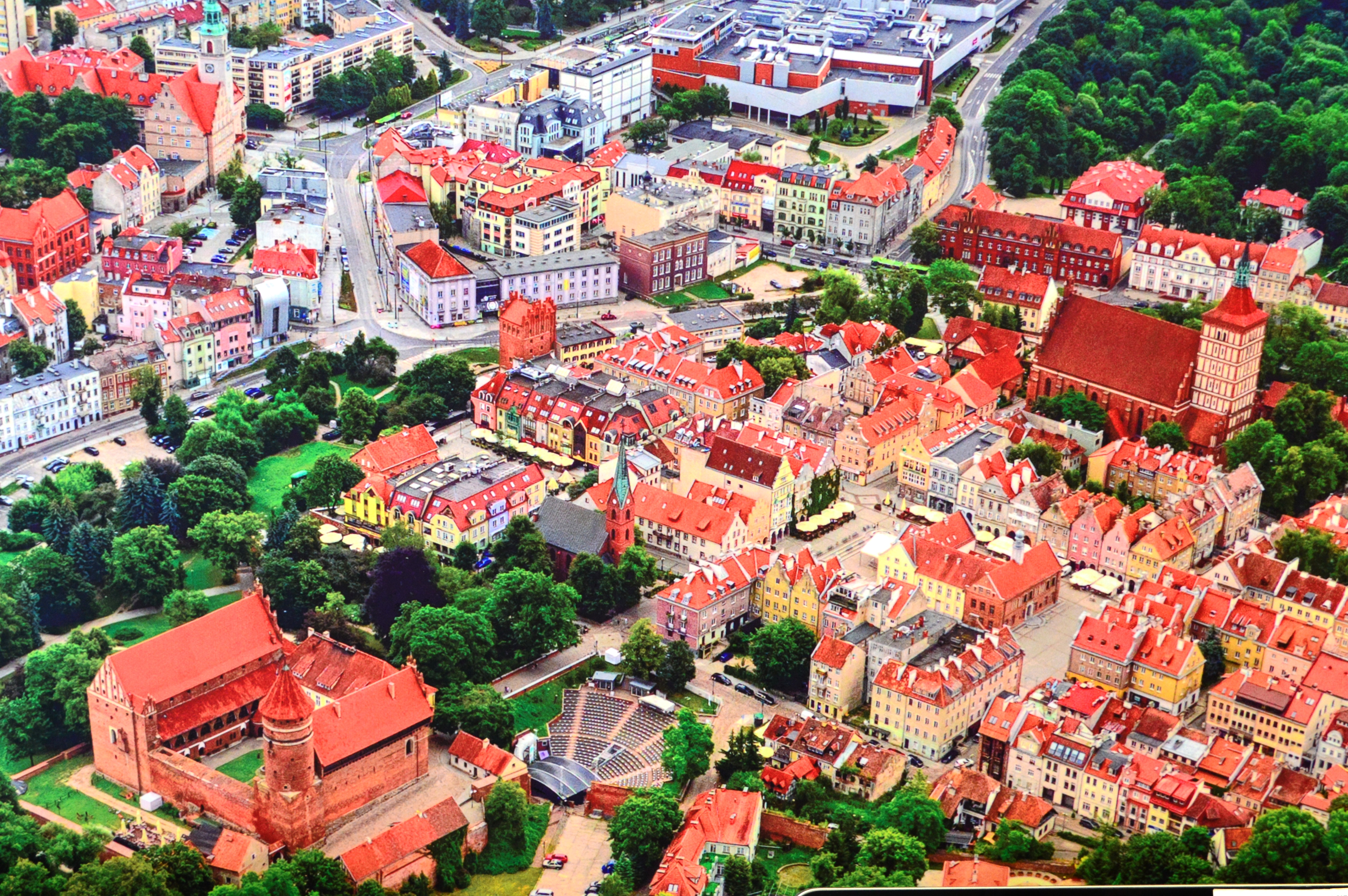
Śródmieście

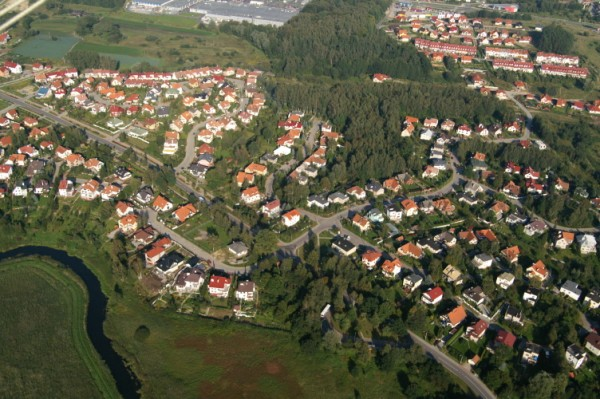
Brzeziny

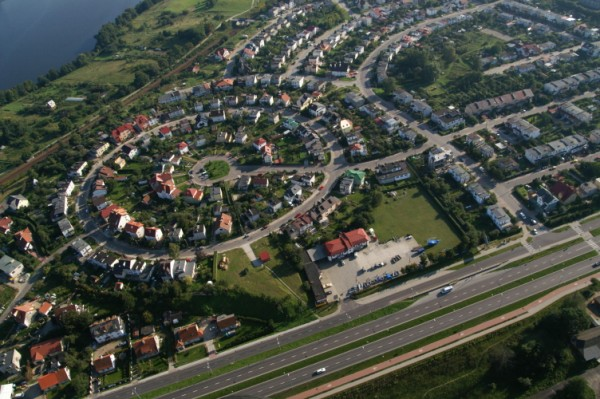
Dajtki

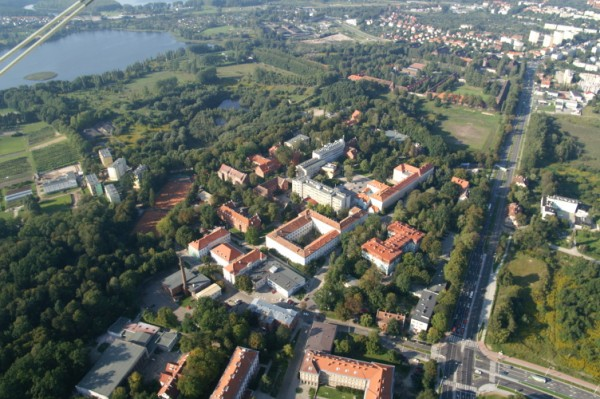
Kortowo

Olsztyn is divided into 23 districts:

District	Population	Area	Density
Brzeziny	1,456	2.25 km^{2} (0.87 sq mi)	647.1/km^{2}
Dajtki	5,863	7.5 km^{2} (2.9 sq mi)	781.7/km^{2}
Generałów	6,500	no data	no data
Grunwaldzkie	6,027	1.46 km^{2} (0.56 sq mi)	4,128.1/km^{2}
Gutkowo	2,256	7.2 km^{2} (2.8 sq mi)	313.3/km^{2}
Jaroty	29,046	4.82 km^{2} (1.86 sq mi)	6,026.1/km^{2}
Kętrzyńskiego	7,621	4.83 km^{2} (1.86 sq mi)	1,577.8/km^{2}
Kormoran	16,166	1.1 km^{2} (0.4 sq mi)	14,696.4/km^{2}
Kortowo	1,131	4.22 km^{2} (1.63 sq mi)	268/km^{2}
Kościuszki	6,704	1.18 km^{2} (0.46 sq mi)	5,681.4/km^{2}
Likusy	2,286	2.1 km^{2} (0.8 sq mi)	1,088.6/km^{2}
Mazurskie	4,615	5.98 km^{2} (2.31 sq mi)	771.7/km^{2}
Nad Jeziorem Długim	2,408	4.23 km^{2} (2 sq mi)	569.3/km^{2}
Nagórki	12,538	1.69 km^{2} (0.65 sq mi)	7,418.9/km^{2}
Pieczewo	10,918	2.24 km^{2} (0.86 sq mi)	4,874.1/km^{2}
Podgrodzie	11,080	1.35 km^{2} (0.52 sq mi)	8,207.4/km^{2}
Podleśna	10,414	9.93 km^{2} (3.83 sq mi)	1,048.7/km^{2}
Pojezierze	13,001	2.39 km^{2} (0.92 sq mi)	5,439.7/km^{2}
Redykajny	1,555	6.1 km^{2} (2.36 sq mi)	254.9/km^{2}
Śródmieście	3,448	0.58 km^{2} (0.22 sq mi)	5,944.8/km^{2}
Wojska Polskiego	6,759	5.03 km^{2} (2 sq mi)	1,343.7/km^{2}
Zatorze	6,988	0.45 km^{2} (0.17 sq mi)	15,528.9/km^{2}
Zielona Górka	1,015	6.44 km^{2} (2.49 sq mi)	157.6/km^{2}

There are many smaller districts: Jakubowo, Karolin, Kolonia Jaroty, Kortowo II, Łupstych, Niedźwiedź, Piękna Góra, Podlesie, Pozorty, Skarbówka Poszmanówka, Słoneczny Stok, Stare Kieźliny, Stare Miasto, Stare Zalbki, Stary Dwór, Track. These do not have council representative assemblies.

== Culture ==
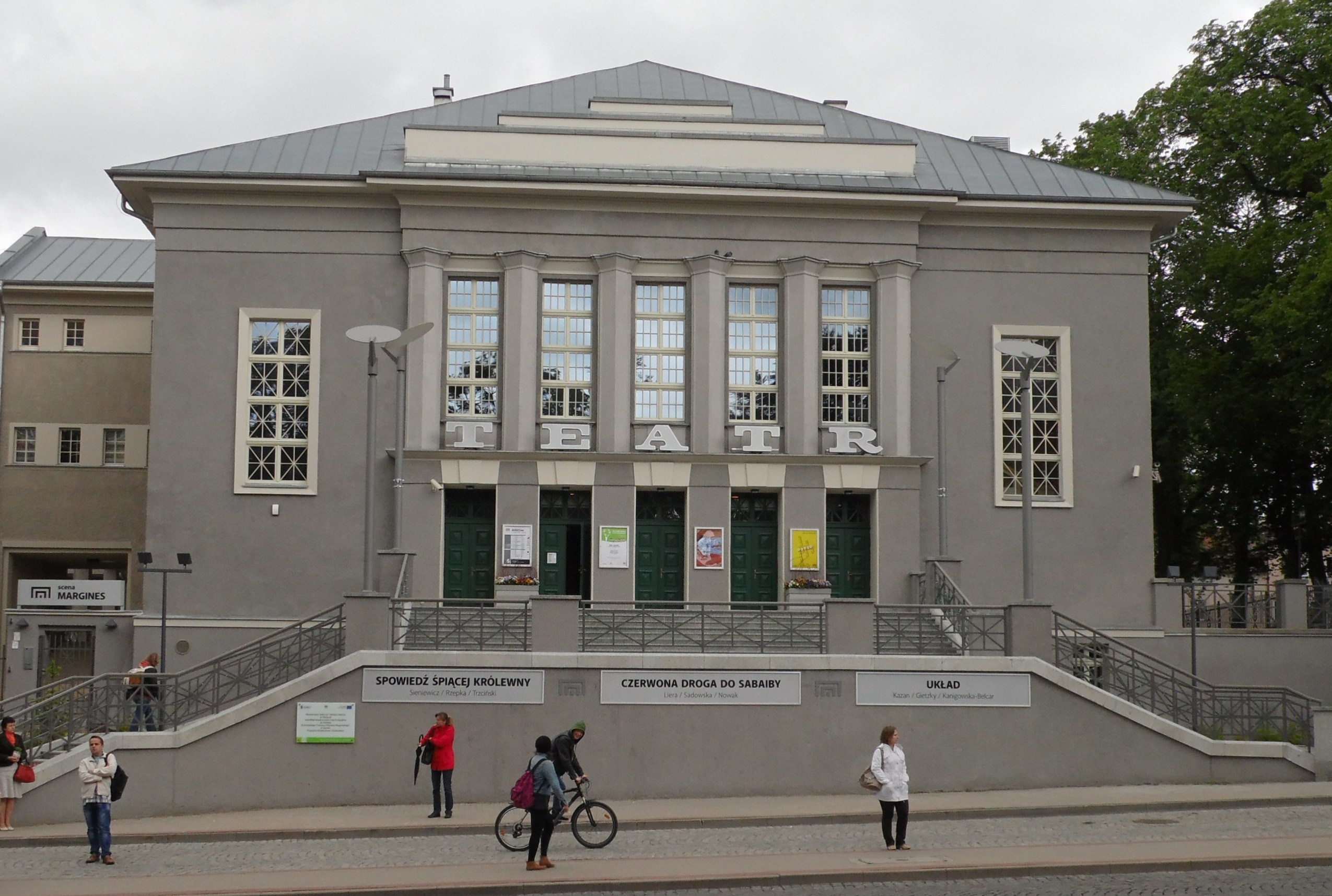
Stefan Jaracz Theatre (built 1925)

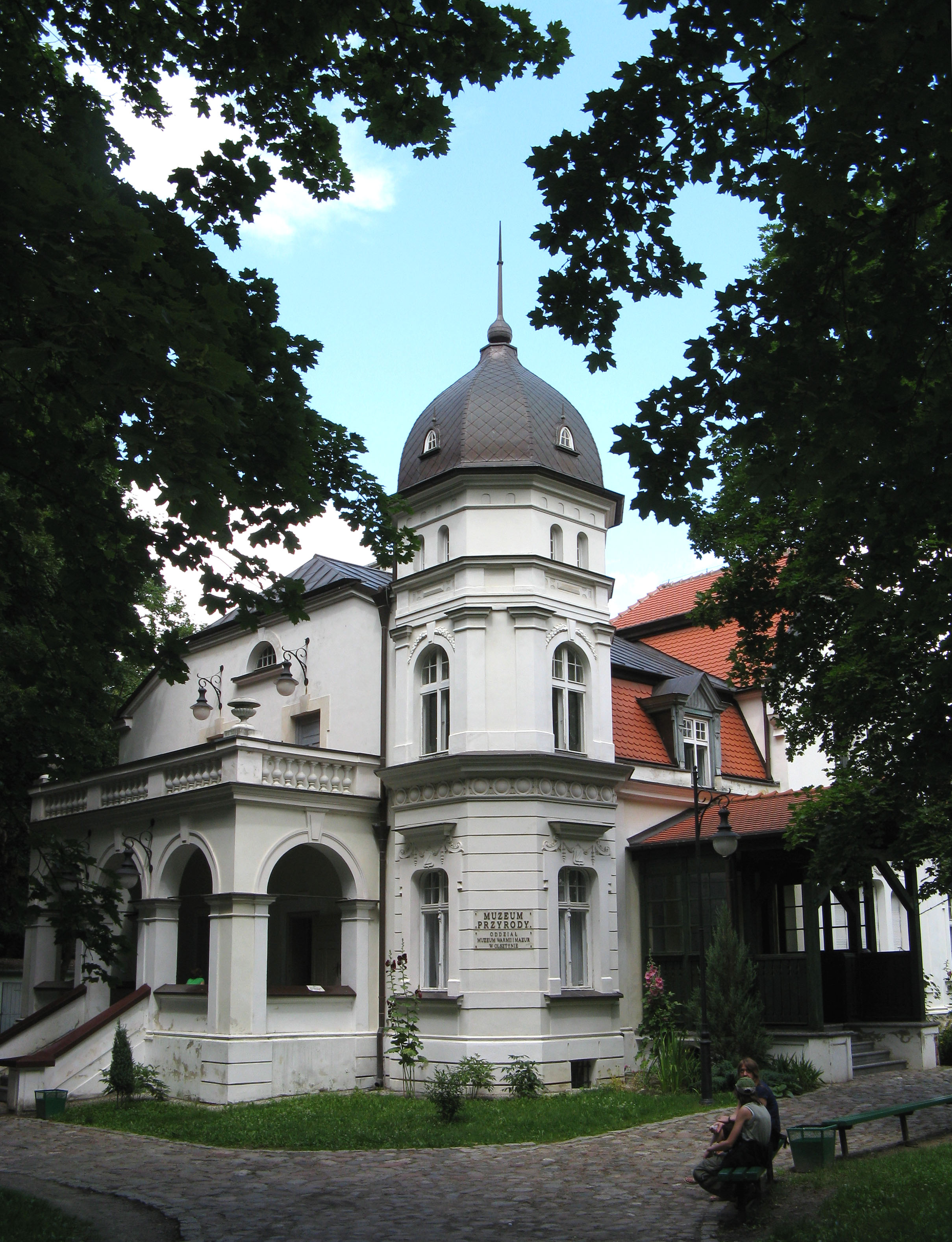
Museum of Nature

=== Theatres ===
- Stefan Jaracz Theatre (est. 1925) the host of International Theatre Festival DEMOLUDY
- Puppet Theatre

=== Cinemas ===
- Helios
- Multikino

=== Museums ===
- Museum of Warmia and Mazury (Muzeum Warmii i Mazur) – Olsztyn's largest museum.
  - Gazeta Olsztyńska House (Dom "Gazety Olsztyńskiej")
  - Museum of Nature (Muzeum Przyrody)
- Museum of Sports (Muzeum Sportu)
- Muzeum Nowoczesności

=== Architecture ===
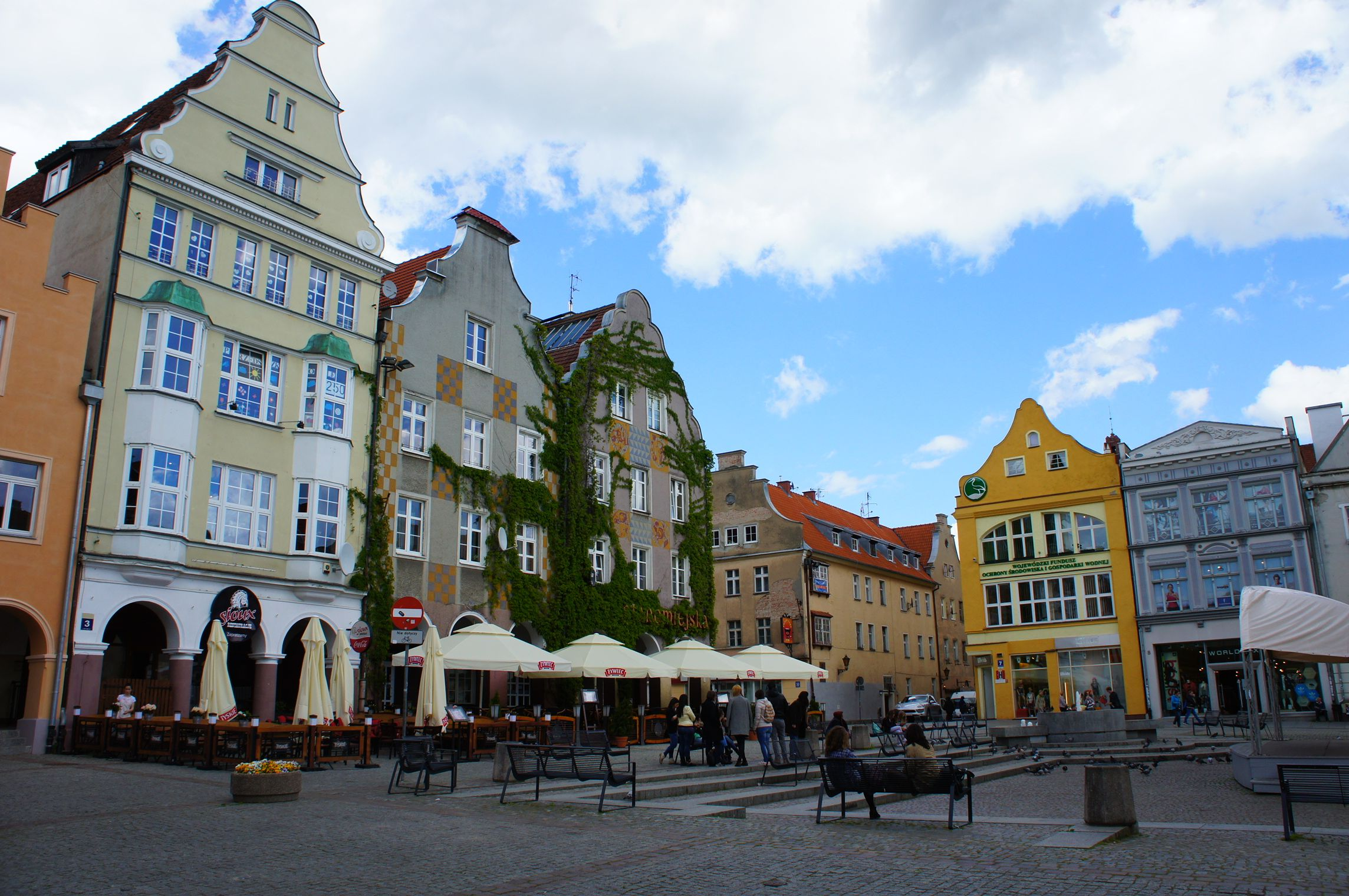
Old townhouses at the Rynek (Market Square) in the Old Town

The historic central district of Olsztyn is the Old Town (Stare Miasto), which contains various historic buildings and structures, including:

- the Gothic castle of Warmian Chapter, built during the 14th century, former home of Nicolaus Copernicus, now a museum
- Gothic St. James' Pro-cathedral with Gothic-Renaissance-Baroque interior
- Old Town Hall on the Market Square – built in the mid-14th century.
- Gazeta Olsztyńska House at the Targ Rybny ("Fish Market"), now a museum.
- the town walls and the High Gate (until the mid-19th century known as the Upper Gate).
- Our Lady Queen of Poland church
- Monument to Nicolaus Copernicus
- Park Zamkowy (Castle Park)
- Baroque Archpresbyter's Palace (Pałac Archiprezbitera)
- Gothic Revival Church of the Salvator

Notable structures outside of the Old Town include:

- the New City Hall
- Jewish Tahara house in Olsztyn built in 1911–1912 by Erich Mendelsohn
- Modernist planetarium with mosaics by Stefan Knapp
- the Jerusalem Chapel, built in 1565
- Neogothic Sacred Heart church, built during the years 1901–1902
- Church of St. Lawrence in the Gutkowo district, built in the late 14th century
- Home Army and Stefan Jaracz monuments and the White Eagle Column
- the Railway Bridge over the River Łyna gorge near Artyleryjska and Wyzwolenia streets, built during the years 1872–1873
- Main Post Office
- Warmian-Masurian Voivodeship office
- Instytut Północny im. Wojciecha Kętrzyńskiego ("Wojciech Kętrzyński Northern Institute")
- Park Centralny (Central Park)
- the Książnica Polska building with one of the oldest active passenger elevators in Poland and Europe
- FM- and TV-mast Olsztyn-Pieczewo – 360 metres high, since the collapse of the Warsaw radio mast the tallest structure in Poland
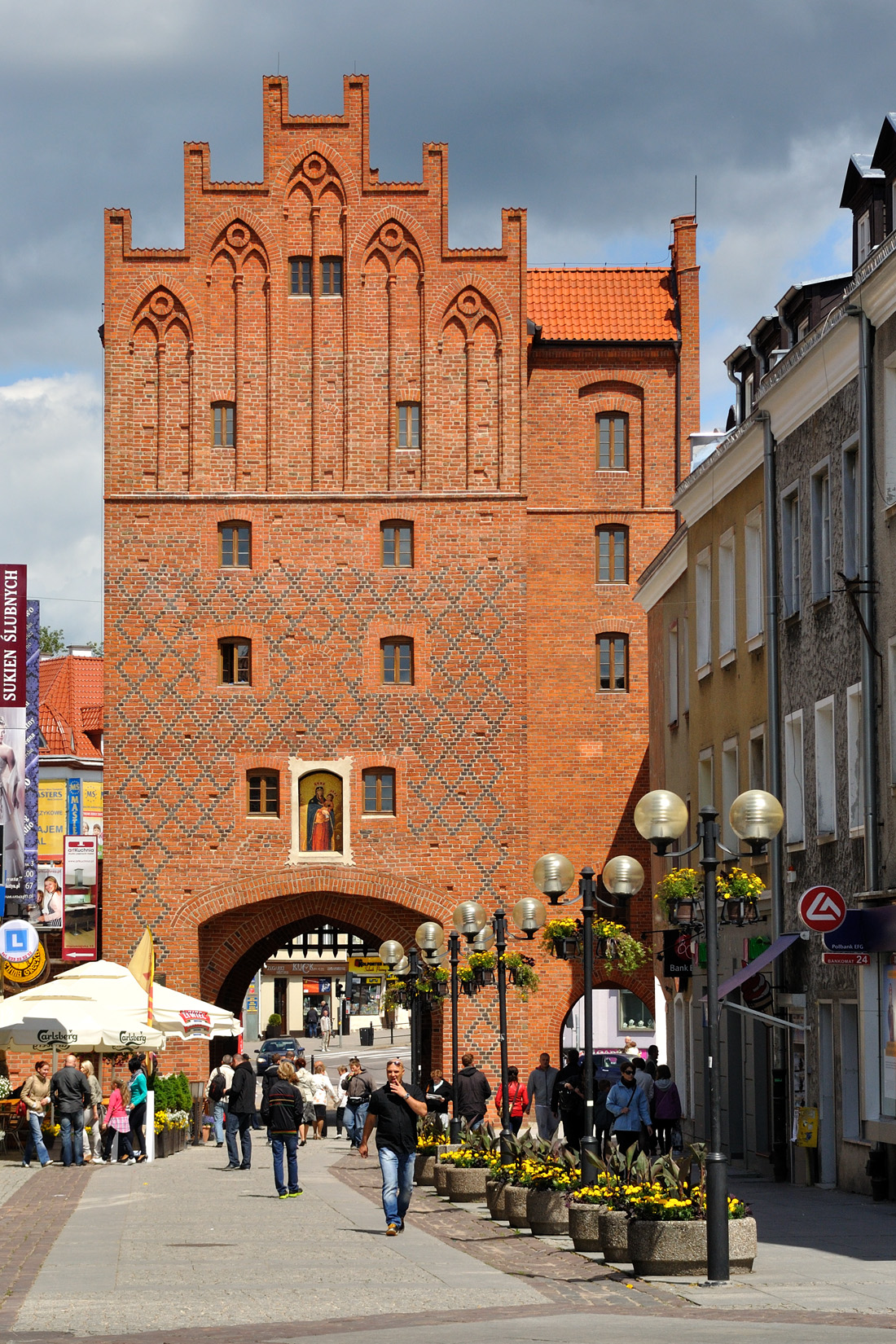
High Gate

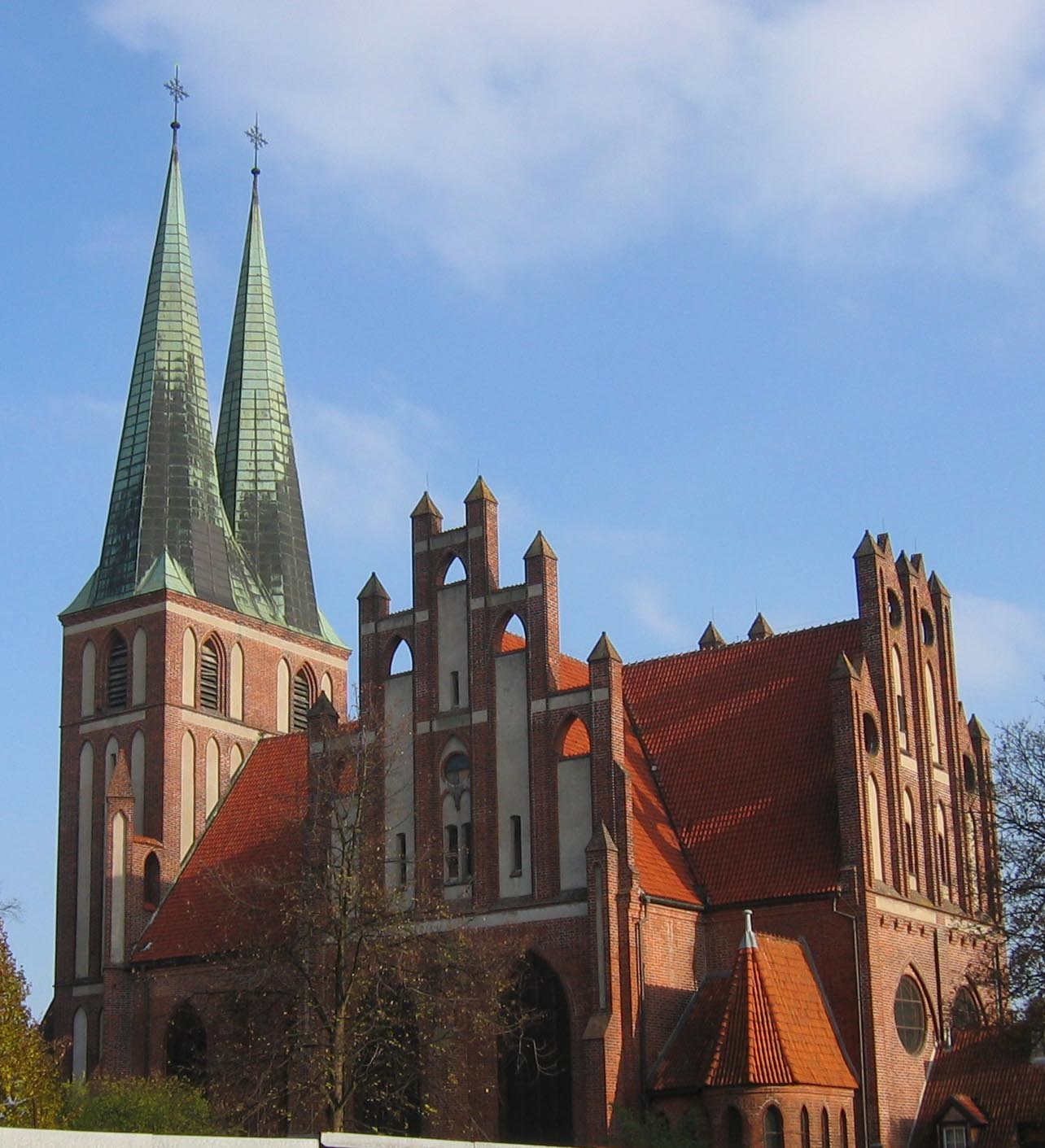
Our Lady Queen of Poland Church

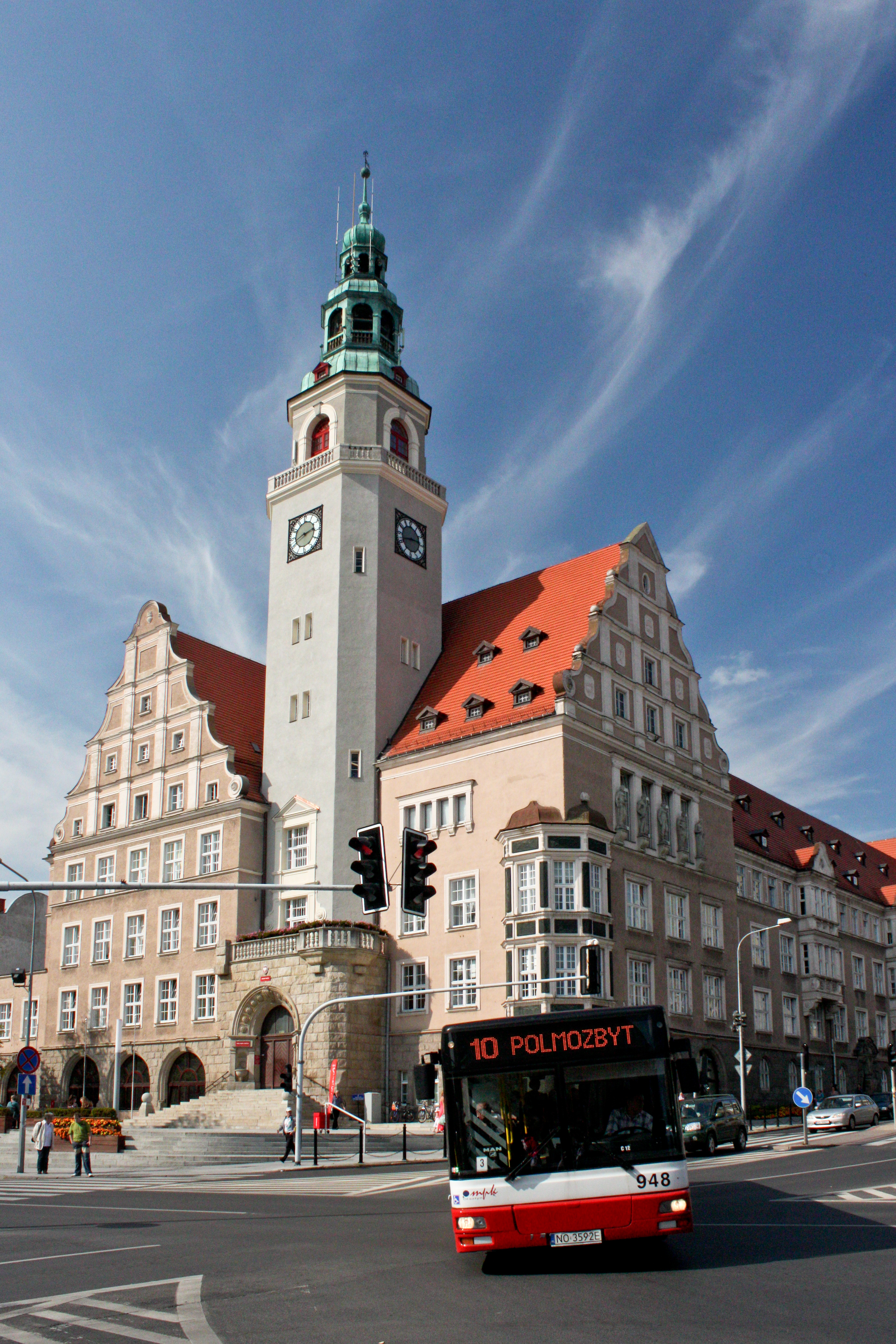
New City Hall

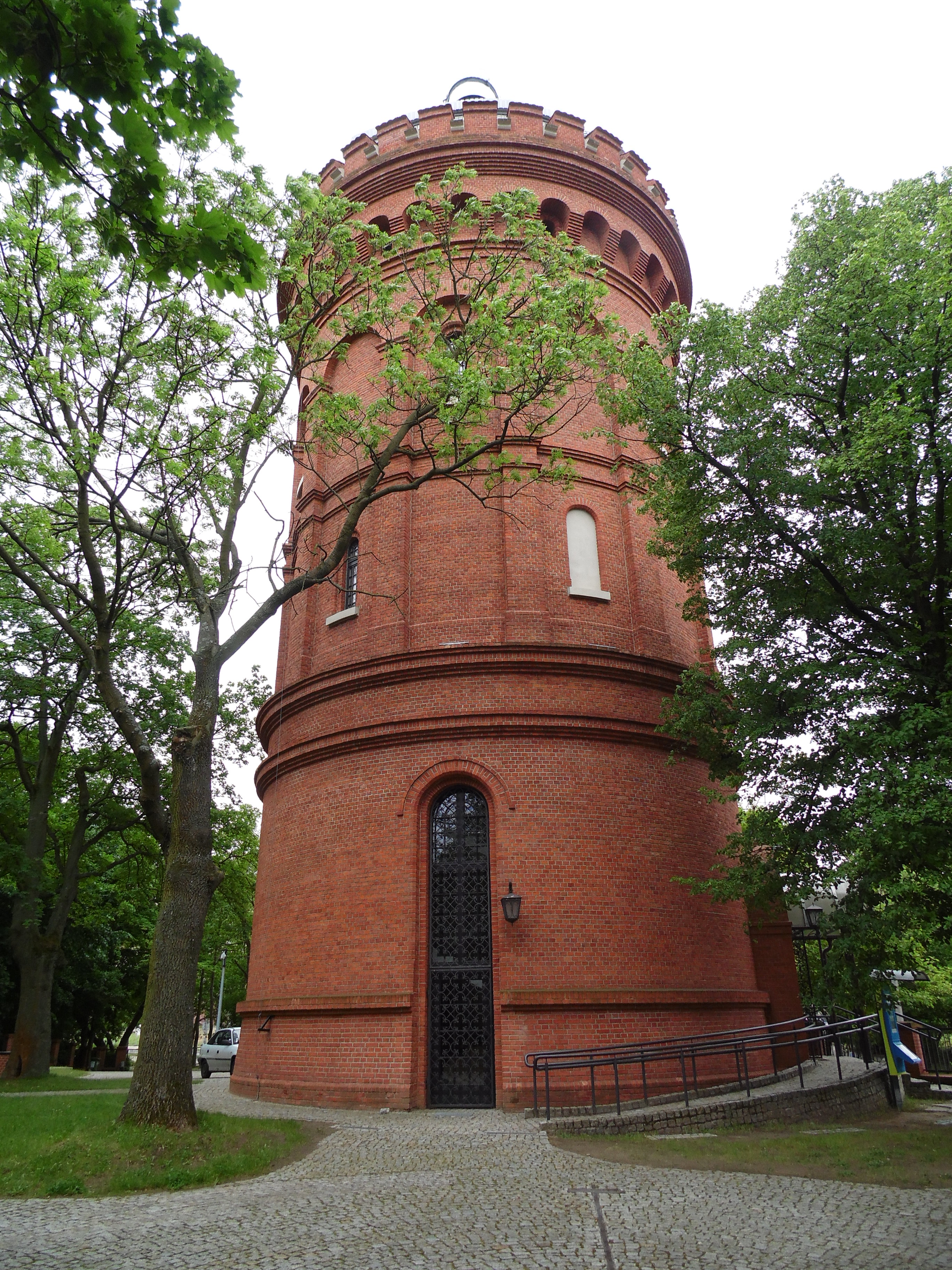
Astronomical observatory

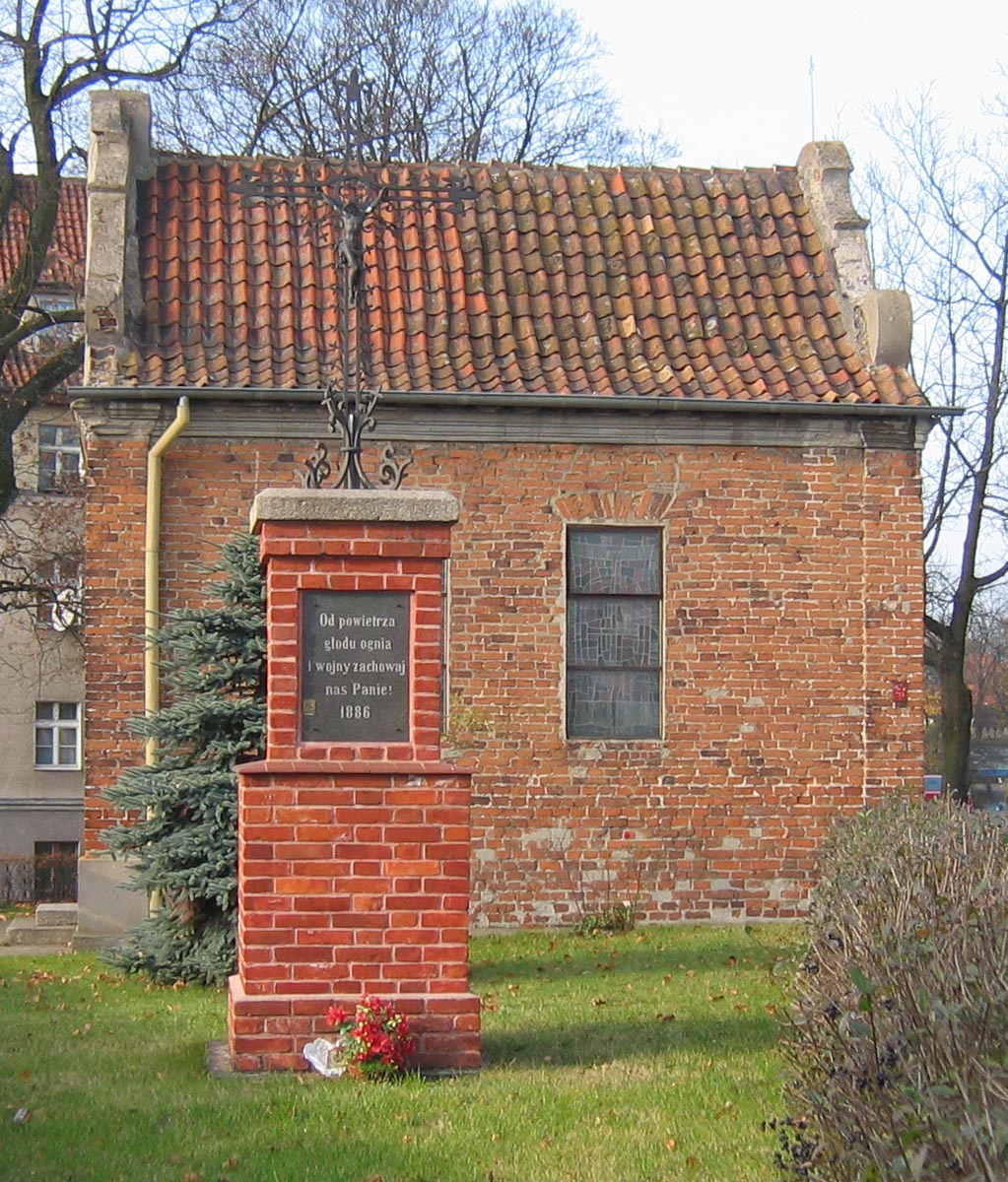
Jerusalem Chapel

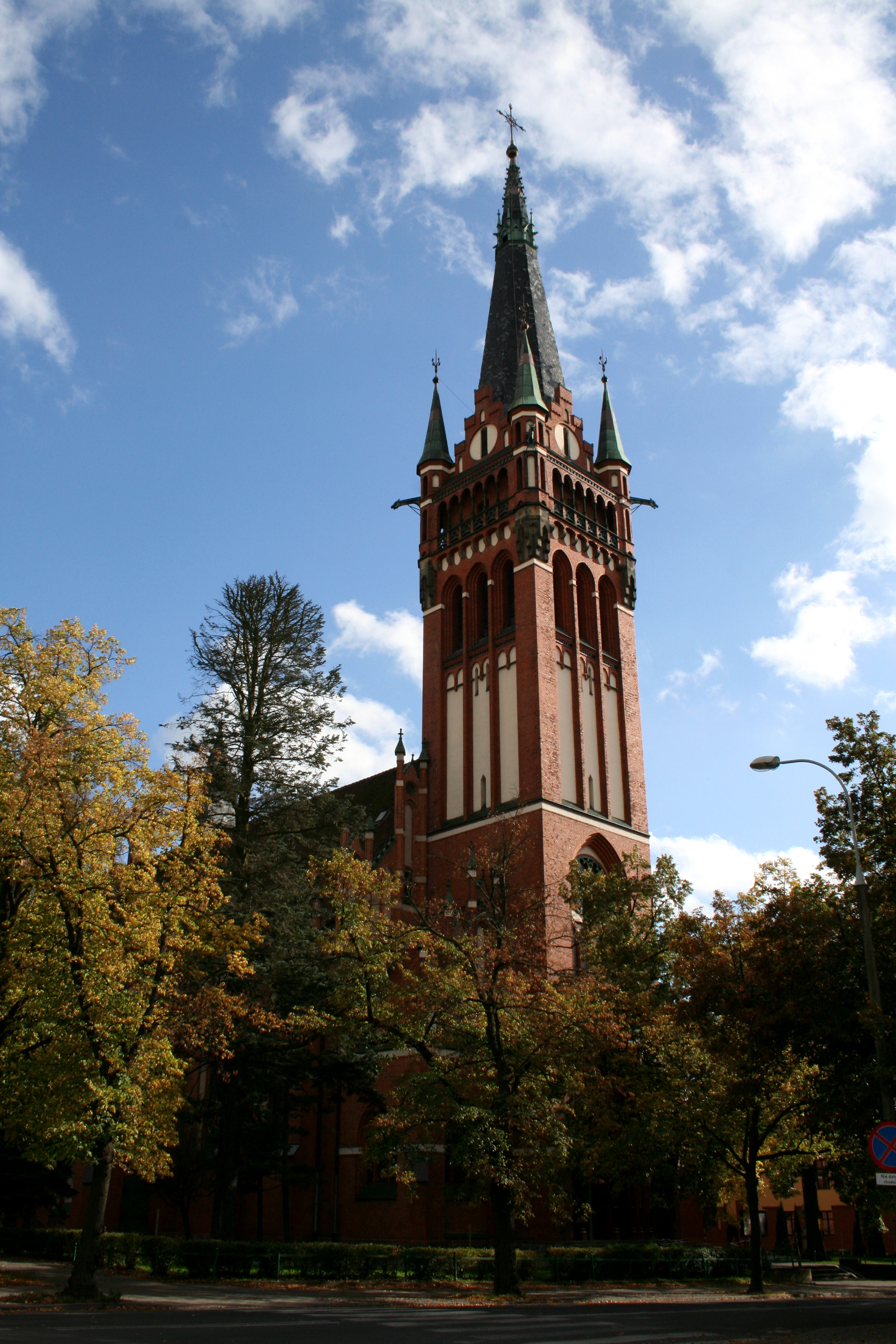
Sacred Heart church

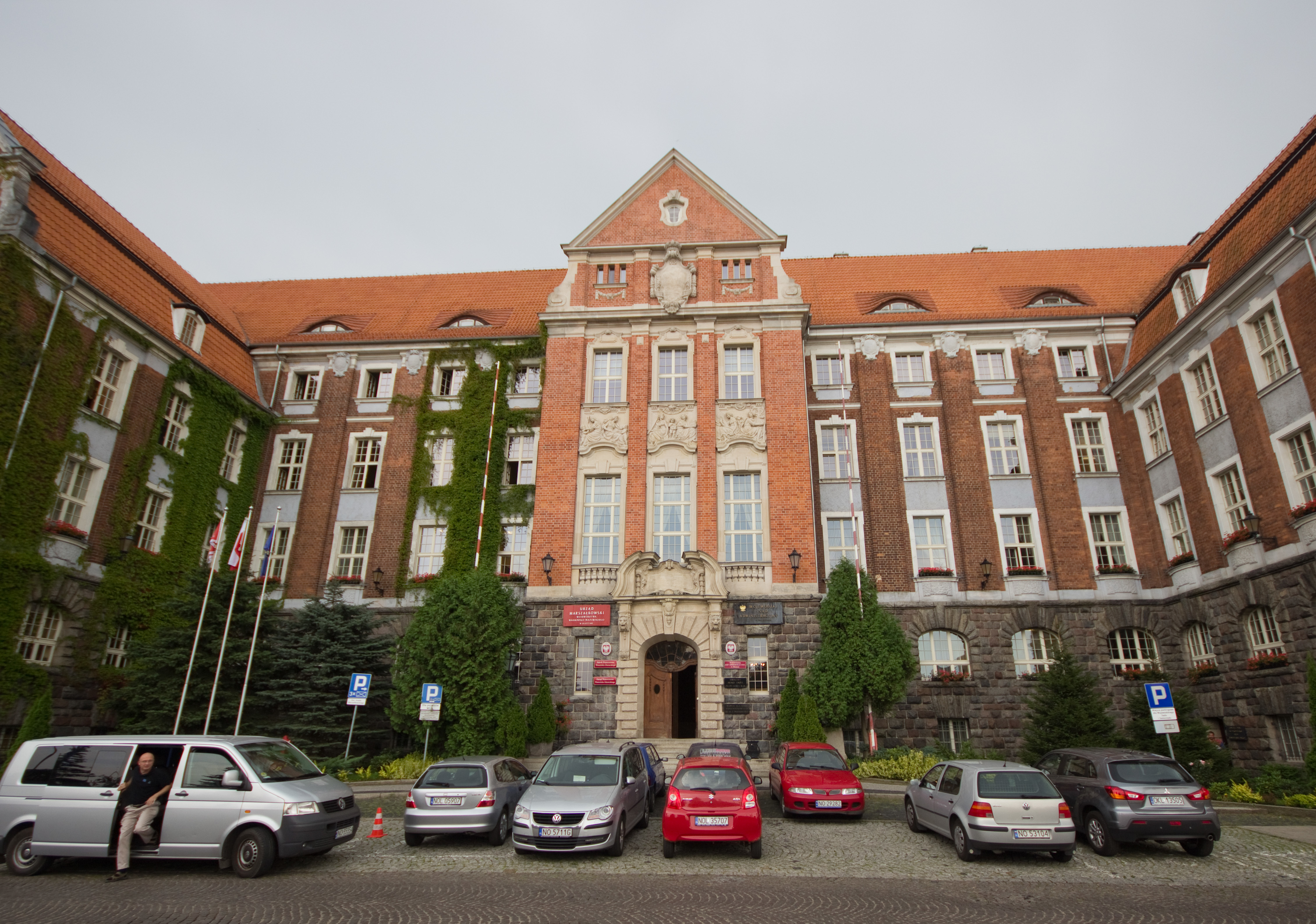
Voivodeship office

=== Music ===
The city is home to the National Symphony Orchestra.

== Economy ==
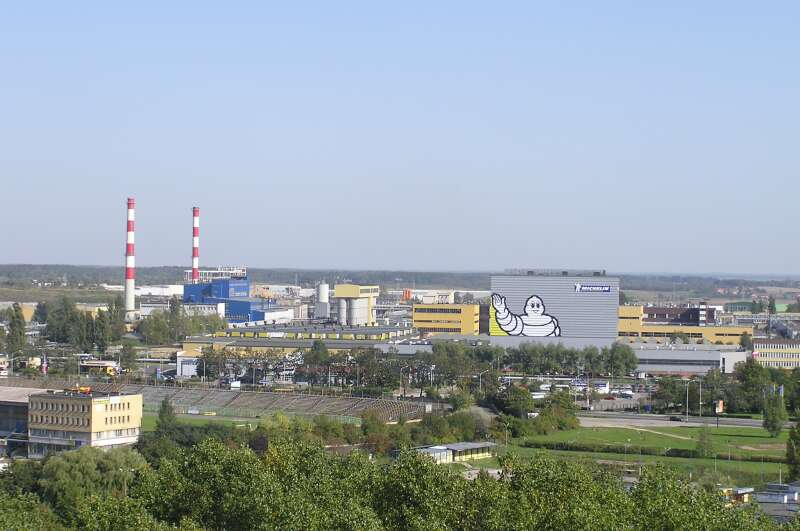
Michelin Polska tyre company

The Michelin Polska tyre company (former Stomil Olsztyn) is the largest employer in the region of Warmia and Masuria. Other important industries are food processing and furniture manufacturing.

== Transportation ==
=== Road ===
==== Bus ====
A bus network with 36 bus lines exists, including 6 suburban lines and 2 night-time lines.

==== Trolleybus ====
In 1939, due to the poor economic situation throughout the interwar period and the city's growing population, a trolleybus line began operation, partially replacing the original tram network. During the Second World War the cars were mainly driven by women.

The trolleybus network consisting of 4 lines was decommissioned on 31 July 1971.

=== Rail ===
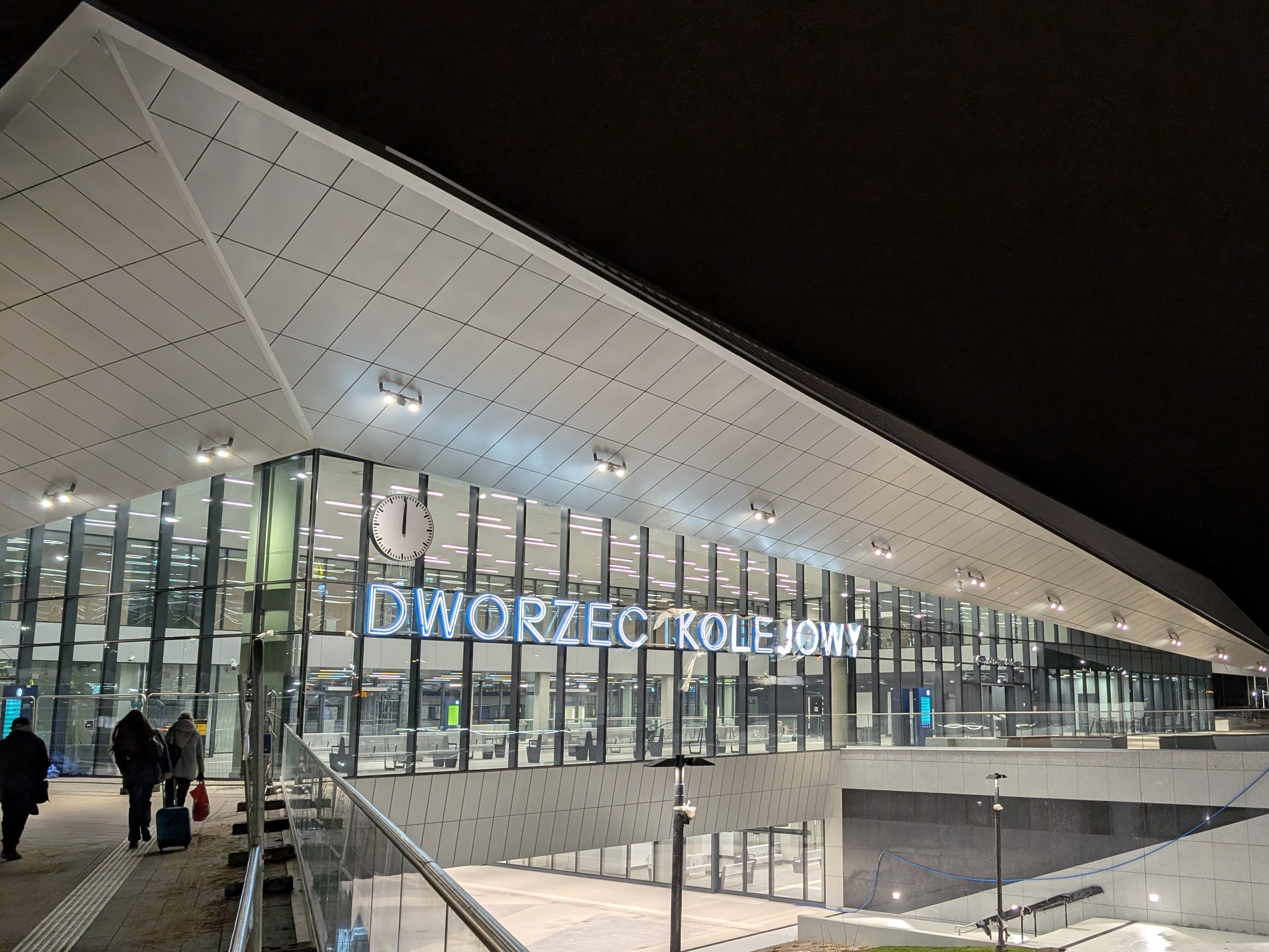
Olsztyn main station

Olsztyn has train connections to various major cities in Poland, including Warsaw, Kraków, Gdańsk, Szczecin, Poznań, Bydgoszcz, Białystok, Wrocław, Łódź, Toruń, and various towns in the region, including Elbląg, Iława, Działdowo and Ełk. Olsztyn Główny is the main railway station in the city. Plans exist to demolish the building and replace it with new infrastructure, contrary to previous information about the current building being renovated.

==== Tram ====
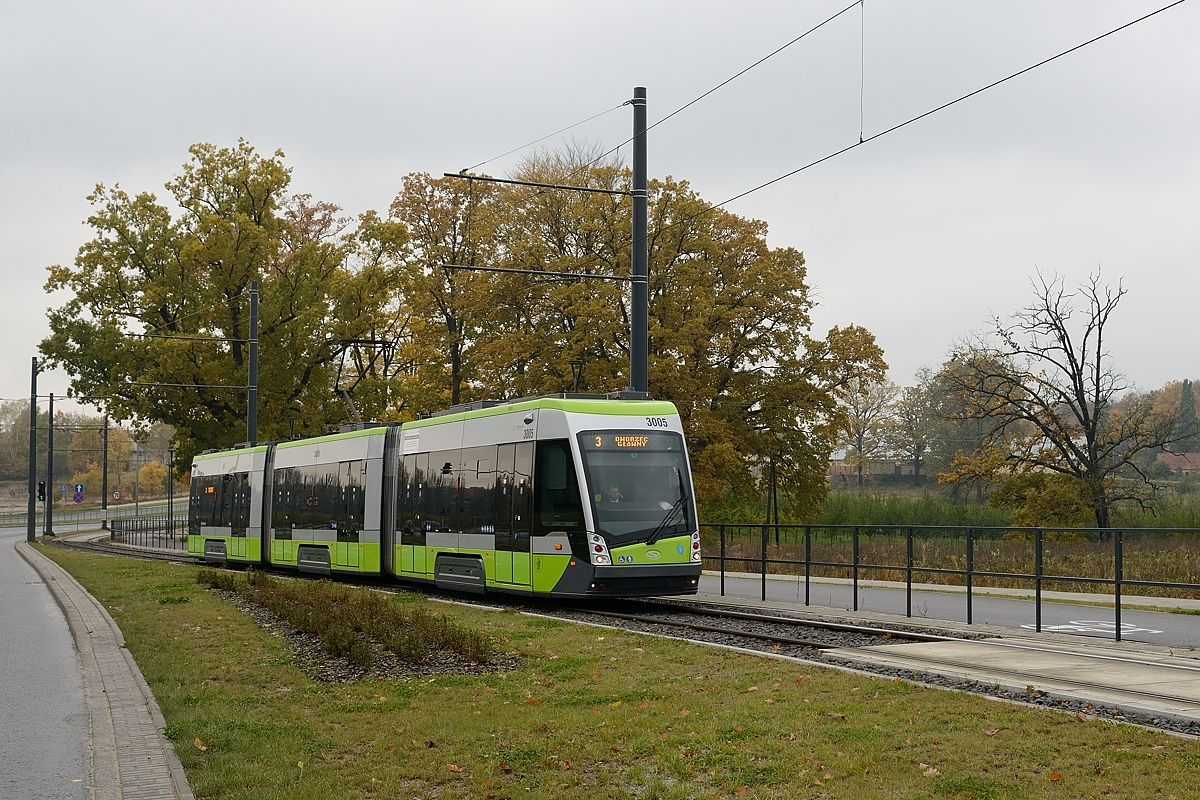
Tram network in Olsztyn re-opened in December 2015

Historically, the city's first tram line was built in 1907 and gradually expanded over the years. It ceased operation in 1965.

In 2006, authorities considered the reintroduction of trams in the city to address transport problems and subsequently concluded feasibility studies on the matter in 2009. An 11-kilometre (7-mile) long tram network was built between 2011 and 2015. The contract was signed in 2011 and construction commenced in 2012. It was a first new tram system built in Poland in 55 years; 15 low-floor Tramino trams were ordered from Solaris in September 2012. There are five tram lines in operation.

In 2024, a 6 kilometres (4 miles) long extension was completed the Turkish manufacturer Durmazlar had been selected to supply 24 trams for the network.

=== Air ===
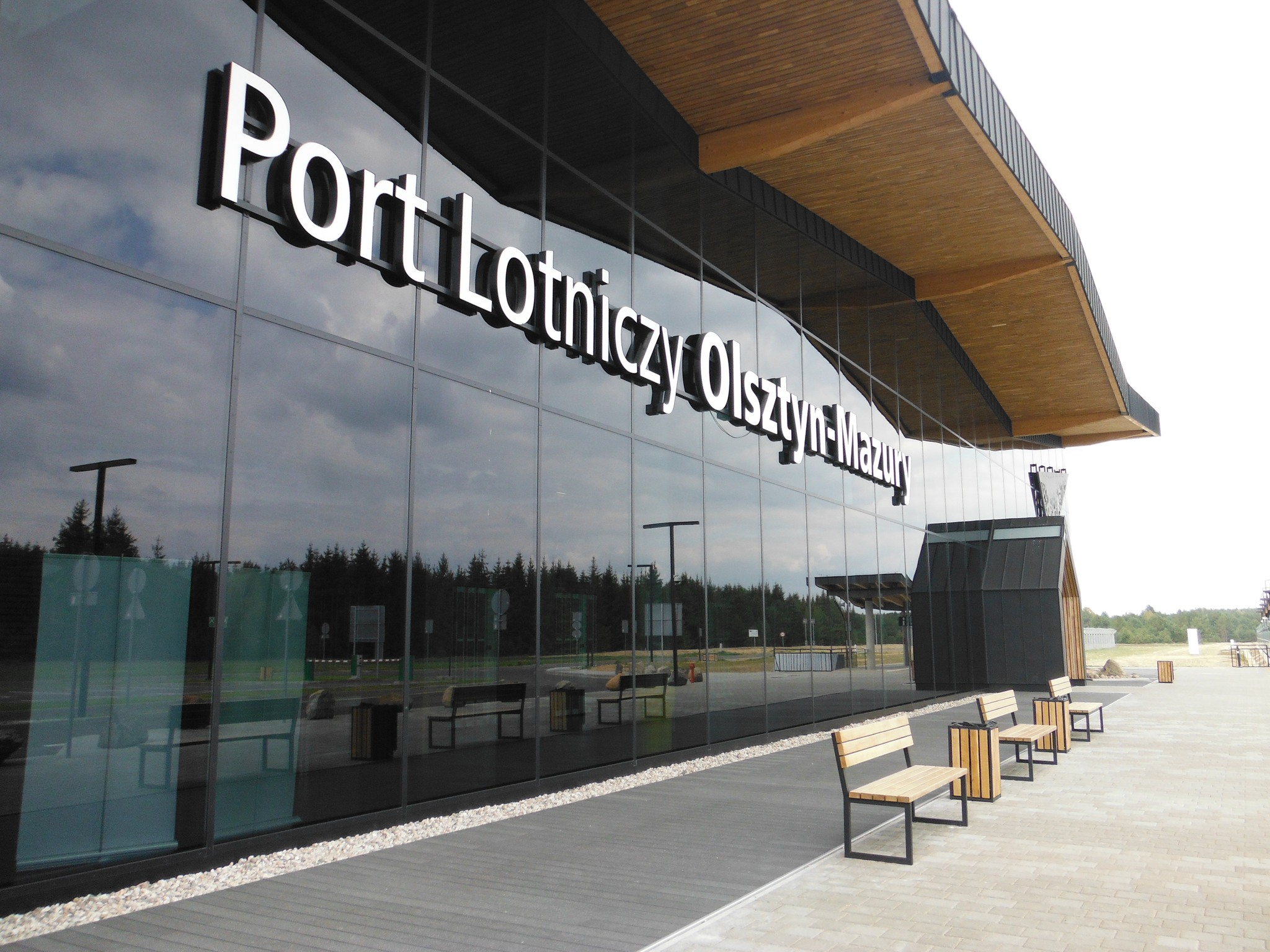
Olsztyn-Mazury Airport

The region and city is served by Olsztyn-Mazury Airport with scheduled international passenger flights. It is located in Szymany, 10 km (6 mi) off Szczytno and 58 km (36 mi) south of the city of Olsztyn. The airport operates flights to London, Dortmund, Kraków and seasonal flights to Rzeszów and Wrocław.

== Education ==
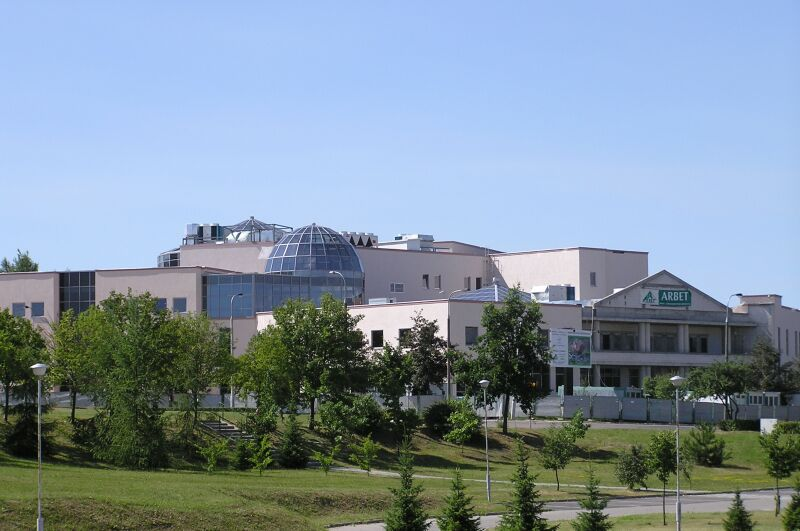
Main library building of the Olsztyn University

- University of Warmia and Mazury in Olsztyn
- Masurian Institute (est. 1943)

== Sports ==
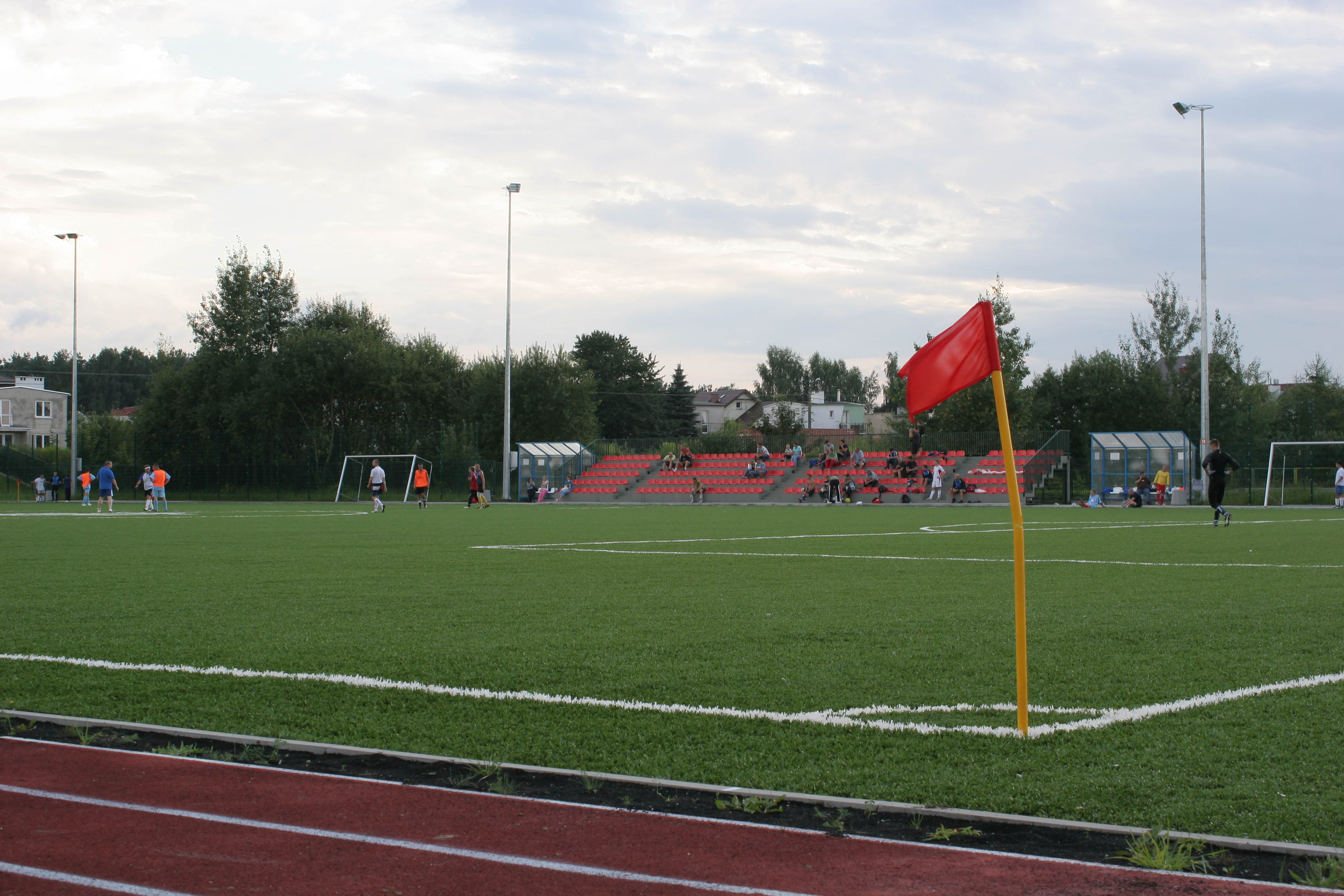
KOS Orlik - A public football field near the 18th Primary School

- Indykpol AZS Olsztyn – men's volleyball team playing in the Polish Volleyball League (PLS, Polska Liga Siatkówki), five time Polish champions
- Stomil Olsztyn – men's football team, playing in the lower divisions. It played in the Ekstraklasa, the country's top flight, from 1994 to 2002.
- Warmia Olsztyn – men's handball team playing in the I liga (second tier). It played in the Superliga, the country's top flight, most recently from 2005 to 2012.
- Warmia Olsztyn – one of the oldest football clubs in the city, playing in the lower leagues. It played on the second tier, most recently in the 1990s
- Constract Olsztyn – men's futsal team
- AZS UWM Trójeczka Olsztyn – men's basketball team playing in the Polish Second League
- WMPD Olsztyn – men's rugby team, playing in the First Polish League
- Budowlani Olsztyn – a wrestling team
- Joanna Jędrzejczyk (born 1987), Polish Muay-Thai and MMA fighter, former UFC Women's Strawweight Champion
- Łukasz Gikiewicz (born 1987), Polish footballer
- Rafał Gikiewicz (born 1987), Polish footballer
- Filip Kurto (born 1991), Polish footballer
- Jakub Kaszuba (born 1995), Polish MMA fighter
- Jakub Wikłacz (born 1996), Polish MMA fighter
- Olsztyn Lakers – American football team

The Memorial of Hubert Jerzy Wagner, an international volleyball friendly tournament, was organized in Olsztyn from 2003 to 2008. The Tour de Pologne, one of UCI World Tour races, was organized in Olsztyn numerous times, most recently in 2008 (as of 2019).

== Politics ==
Historical population
Year	Pop.	±%
1910	33,077	—
1925	38,105	+15.2%
1939	50,396	+32.3%
1950	43,831	−13.0%
1960	67,887	+54.9%
1970	94,753	+39.6%
1980	133,314	+40.7%
1990	162,935	+22.2%
2000	172,843	+6.1%
2010	175,420	+1.5%
2020	171,249	−2.4%

Members of the Sejm elected from Olsztyn constituency in 2005:

- Mieczysław Aszkiełowicz, Self-Defense of the Republic of Poland (Samoobrona Rzeczypospolitej Polskiej)
- Beata Bublewicz, Civic Platform (PO, Platforma Obywatelska)
- Jerzy Gosiewski, Law and Justice (PiS, Prawo i Sprawiedliwość)
- Tadeusz Iwiński, Democratic Left Alliance (SLD, Sojusz Lewicy Demokratycznej)
- Edward Ośko, League of Polish Families (LPR, Liga Polskich Rodzin)
- Adam Puza, Law and Justice (PiS, Prawo i Sprawiedliwość)
- Sławomir Rybicki, Civic Platform (PO, Platforma Obywatelska)
- Lidia Staroń, Civic Platform (PO, Platforma Obywatelska)
- Aleksander Marek Szczygło, Law and Justice (PiS, Prawo i Sprawiedliwość)
- Zbigniew Włodkowski, Polish Peasant Party (PSL, Polskie Stronnictwo Ludowe)

Members of Senate elected from Olsztyn constituency in 2005:

- Ryszard Józef Górecki, Civic Platform (PO, Platforma Obywatelska)
- Jerzy Szmit, Law and Justice (PiS, Prawo i Sprawiedliwość)

== Notable people ==
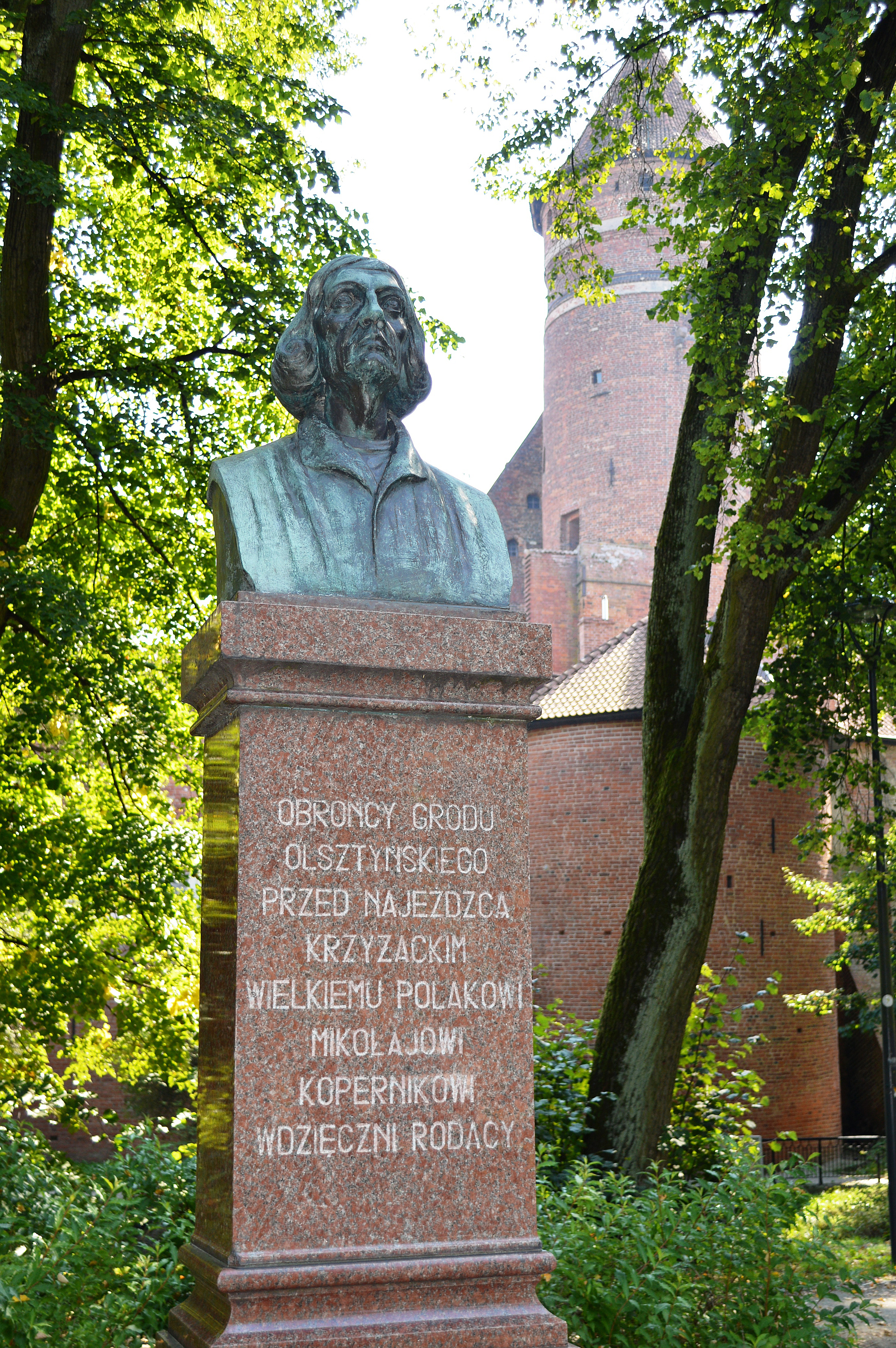
Bust of Nicolaus Copernicus near the castle

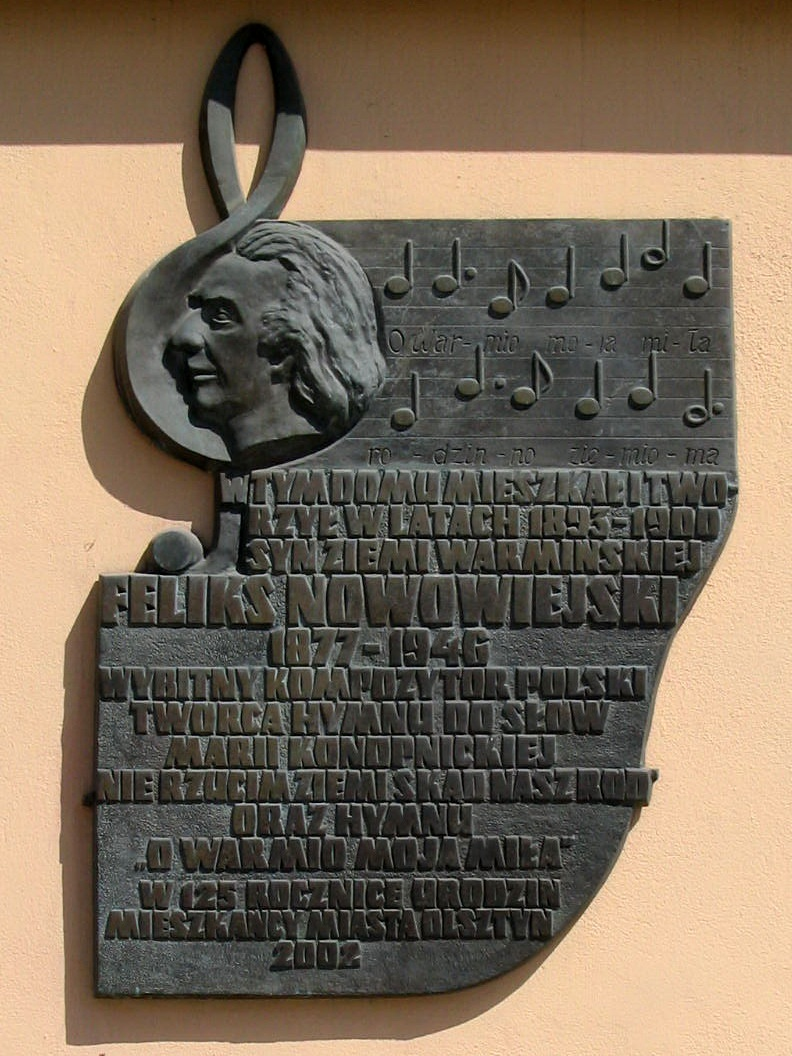
Plaque commemorating Feliks Nowowiejski on his former home

- Johannes von Leysen (1310–1388), town founder and mayor
- Nicolaus Copernicus (1473–1543), astronomer, administrator, and town commander
- Johannes Knolleisen (+1511), German academic and provider of academic stipends
- Lucas David (1503–1583), German historian of Prussia
- Marcin Kromer (1512–1589), Polish cartographer, diplomat and historian, personal secretary of Kings of Poland, Bishop of Warmia
- Antoni Blank (1785–1844), Polish painter
- Hugo Haase (1863–1919), Jewish-German politician, jurist and pacifist
- Franz Justus Rarkowski (1873–1950), military bishop (1938–1945)
- August Trunz (1875–1963), founder of the Prussica-Sammlung Trunz
- Feliks Nowowiejski (1877–1946), Polish composer, conductor, concert organist
- Maximilian Kaller (1880–1947) German prelate, bishop of Ermland in 1930–1945
- Erich Mendelsohn (1887–1953), German-Jewish architect who fled the Nazis
- Olga Desmond (1891–1964), German dancer and actress
- Hermann Dohna-Finckenstein (1894–1942), German estate owner and politician
- Günter Wand (1912–2002), German conductor
- Kurt Baluses (1914–72) German football (soccer) player and manager
- Herbert Schachtschneider (1919–2008), German operatic tenor
- Hans-Jürgen Wischnewski (1922–2005), German politician
- Curt Lowens (1925–2017), German actor
- Leonhard Pohl (1929–2014), German gymnast
- Józef Glemp (1929–2013), Polish prelate, bishop of Warmia 1979–1981
- Jörg Kuebart (1934–2018) German general of the German Air Force
- Karl-Heinz Hopp (1936–2007) German rower who competed in the 1960 Summer Olympics
- Wolf Lepenies (born 1941), German sociologist, political scientist and author
- Eugeniusz Geno Malkowski (1942–2016), Polish artist, painter and academic
- Ulrich Schrade (1943–2009), German-Polish philosopher and pedagogue
- Marian Bublewicz (1950–1993), Polish rally and race driver of the 1980s and 1990s
- Juliusz Machulski (born 1955), Polish film director
- Izabela Trojanowska (born 1955), Polish actress and singer
- Andrzej Friszke (born 1956), Polish historian
- Krzysztof Hołowczyc (born 1962), Polish rally driver
- Piotr "Peter" Wiwczarek (born 1965), Polish musician, vocalist and lead guitarist of the death metal band Vader
- Artur Wojdat (born 1968), swimmer
- Elżbieta Jabłońska (born 1970), Polish multidisciplinary artist, born in Olsztyn
- Mamed Khalidov (born 1980), Russian-Polish mixed martial artist
- Wojciech Grzyb (born 1981), Polish volleyball player
- Julia Marcell (born 1982), Polish singer/songwriter and pianist
- Małgorzata Jasińska (born 1984), Polish professional cyclist (retd.)
- Michał Trzeciakiewicz (born 1984), retired Polish footballer
- Marcin Możdżonek (born 1985), volleyball player
- Adrian Mierzejewski (born 1986), Polish footballer
- Łukasz Gikiewicz (born 1987), Polish footballer
- Rafał Gikiewicz (born 1987), Polish footballer
- Joanna Jędrzejczyk (born 1987), Muay-Thai and MMA fighter, former UFC Women's Strawweight Champion
- Paweł Dawidowicz (born 1995), Polish footballer
- Artur Szalpuk (born 1995), Polish volleyball player, 2018 World Champion

== International relations ==
=== Consulates ===
There are honorary consulates of Belarus, Germany and Lithuania in Olsztyn.

=== Twin towns – Sister cities ===
Olsztyn is twinned with:

Calpe, Alicante, Valencian Community, Spain; Châteauroux, Indre, Centre-Val de Loire, France; Gelsenkirchen, North Rhine-Westphalia, Germany	Halmstad, Halland County, Sweden; Lutsk, Ukraine; Offenburg, Baden-Württemberg, Germany; Richmond, VA, United States	Rovaniemi, Finland; Bielsko-Biała, Silesian Voivodeship, Poland; Weifang, China

Olsztyn belongs to the Federation of Copernicus Cities, an association of cities where Copernicus lived and worked, such as Bologna, Frombork, Kraków, and Toruń. The main office of the federation is situated at Olsztyn Planetarium and Astronomical Observatory, located on St. Andrew's Hill (143 m) in a former water tower erected in 1897.

== Citations ==
=== Further reading ===
- http://www.olsztyn.eu/ Archived 28 January 2023 at the Wayback Machine (in Polish)
- https://web.archive.org/web/20100220023326/http://zamkigotyckie.org.pl/olsztyn.htm (in Polish)
- https://web.archive.org/web/20120308112401/http://www.pascal.pl/atrakcja.php?id=25797 (in Polish)
