= List of universities in Poland =

This is a list of universities in Poland. In total, there are approximately 457 universities and collegiate-level institutions of higher education in Poland, including 131 government-funded and 326 privately owned universities, with almost 2 million enrolled students as of 2010. According to the March 18, 2011 Act of the Polish Parliament, the universities are divided into categories based on their legal status and level of authorization.

There are forty publicly funded and two private universities considered classical, granting doctoral degrees on top of bachelor's and master's degrees in at least ten fields of knowledge. The remaining universities are divided according to their educational profile usually reflected in their differing names. Academy is used for institutions which focus on fine arts, music and drama. The technical universities specialize in engineering and the physical sciences. (The name refers to the subjects taught; they are not technical schools.)

In total, there are 24 cities in Poland, with between one and eight state-funded universities each. Among the top are Warsaw, Kraków, Poznań, Łódź and Wrocław. The Polish names of listed universities are given in brackets, followed by a standard abbreviation (if commonly used or if existent). Note that some of the institutions might choose to translate their own name as university in English, even if they do not officially have the Polish-language equivalent name of uniwersytet.

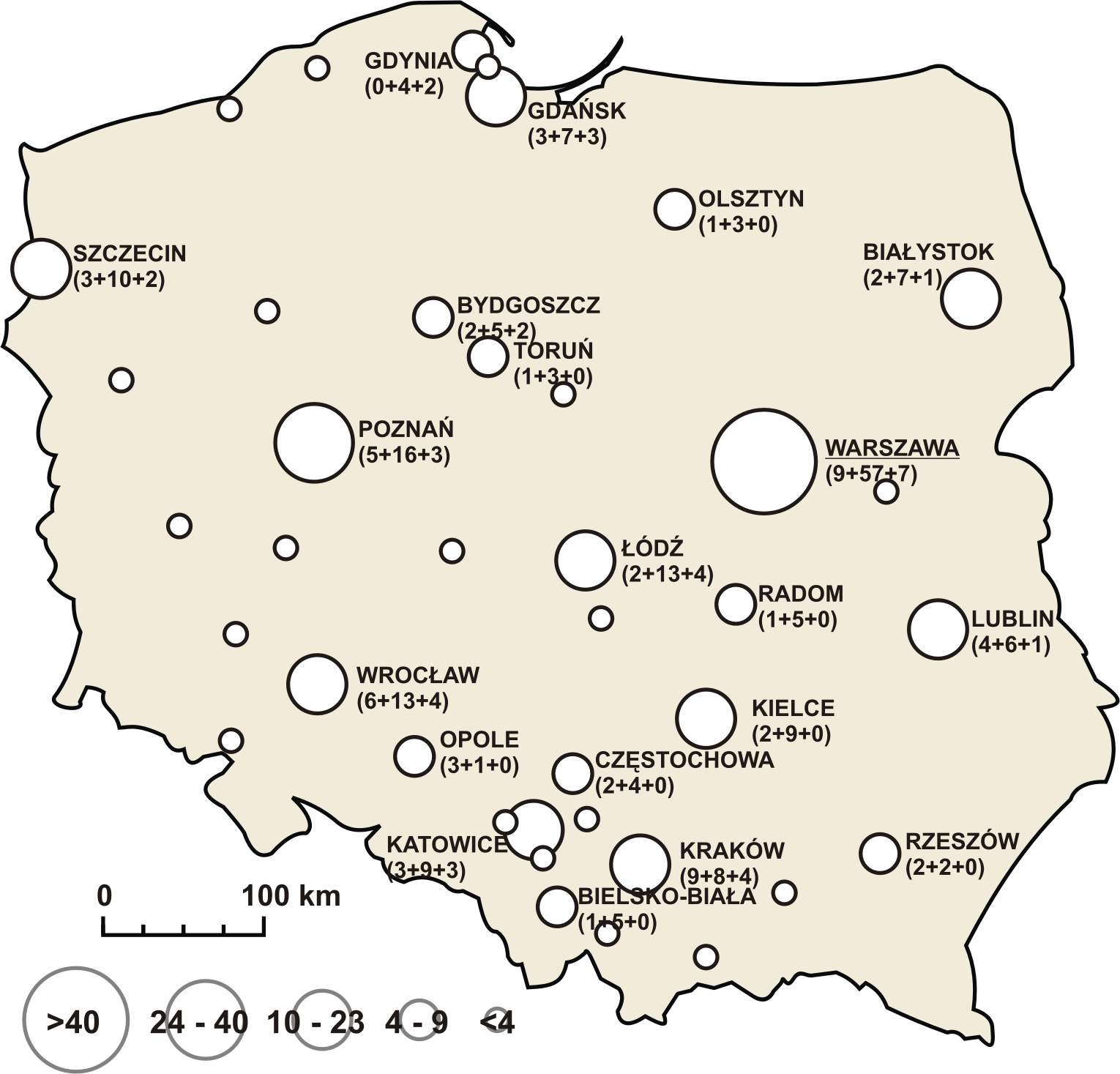
Density of collegiate-level institutions of higher education across Poland

== Public universities ==
Please use table sort buttons for year of establishment in chronological order and alphabetical list of locations

| Name in English | Name in Polish (abbreviation) | Location | Est. |
|---|---|---|---|
| University of Białystok | Uniwersytet w Białymstoku: Biology; Chemistry; Computer Science; Cultural Studies; Economics; Education; History; International Relations; Law; Management; Mathematics; Philology; Philosophy and Cognitive Science; Physics; Sociology | Białystok | 1997 |
| Kazimierz Wielki University | Uniwersytet Kazimierza Wielkiego w Bydgoszczy, UKW: Faculty of Humanities; Faculty of Mathematics, Physics and Technical Sciences Natural Sciences; Faculty of Pedagogy and Psychology; Faculty of Administration and Social Sciences; Faculty of Physical Education, Health and Tourism | Bydgoszcz | 1969 |
| University of Gdańsk | Uniwersytet Gdański, UG: Faculty of Biology; Faculty of Chemistry; Faculty of Economics; Faculty of History; Faculty of Languages; Faculty of Law and Administration; Faculty of Management; Faculty of Mathematics, Physics and Informatics; Faculty of Oceanography and Geography; Faculty of Social Sciences; Intercollegiate Faculty of Biotechnology (with Medical University of Gdańsk) | Gdańsk | 1970 |
| Jagiellonian University | Uniwersytet Jagielloński, UJ: Medical College; Medicine; Pharmacy; Health Care; Law and Administration; Philosophy; History; Philology; Polish Language and Literature; Physics, Astronomy and Applied Computer Science; Mathematics and Computer Science; Chemistry; Biology and Earth Sciences; Management and Social Communication; International and Political Studies; Biochemistry, Biophysics and Biotechnology | Kraków | 1364 |
| John Paul II Catholic University | Katolicki Uniwersytet Lubelski Jana Pawła II, KUL | Lublin | 1918 |
| Maria Curie-Skłodowska University | Uniwersytet Marii Curie-Skłodowskiej, UMCS: Arts; Biology and Biotechnology; Chemistry; Economics; Geosciences and Land Management; Philosophy and Sociology; Humanities; Mathematics, Physics and Computer Science; Pedagogy and Psychology; Political Science; Law and Administration | Lublin | 1944 |
| University of Łódź | Uniwersytet Łódzki, UŁ: Biology and Environmental Protection; Chemistry; Economics and Sociology; Philology; Philosophy and History; Physics and Applied Informatics; Mathematics and Computer Science; Geographical Sciences; Educational Sciences; Law and Administration; Management; International and Political Studies | Łódź | 1945 |
| University of Warmia and Mazury | Uniwersytet Warmińsko-Mazurski w Olsztynie, UWM: Collegium Medicum; The Faculty of Medical Sciences; The School of Public Health; The Faculty of Agriculture and Forestry; The Faculty of Animal Bioengineering; The Faculty of Arts; The Faculty of Biology and Biotechnology; The Faculty of Economic Sciences; The Faculty of Geoengineeering; The Faculty of Food Sciences; The Faculty of Humanities; The Faculty of Law and Administration; The Faculty of Mathematics and Computer Sciences; The Faculty of Social Sciences; The Faculty of Technical Sciences; The Faculty of Theology; The Faculty of Veterinary Medicine | Olsztyn | 1999 |
| Opole University | Uniwersytet Opolski, UO: 1. Faculty of Philology; 2. Faculty of Social Sciences; 3. Faculty of Theology; 4. Faculty of Mathematics, Physics and Computer Science; 5. Faculty of Natural Sciences and Technology; 6. Faculty of Economics; 7. Faculty of Law and Administration; 8. Faculty of Chemistry; 9. Faculty of Art | Opole | 1994 |
| Adam Mickiewicz University | Uniwersytet Adama Mickiewicza w Poznaniu, UAM: Faculty of English; Faculty of Biology; Faculty of Chemistry; Faculty of Educational Studies; Faculty of Geographical and Geological Sciences; Faculty of History; Faculty of Law and Administration; Faculty of Mathematics and Computer Science; Faculty of Modern Languages and Literature; Faculty of Physics; Faculty of Polish and Classical Philology; Faculty of Political Science and Journalism; Faculty of Social Sciences and Philosophy; Faculty of Theology; Faculty of Pedagogy and Fine Arts, in Kalisz | Poznań | 1919 |
| University of Radom | Uniwersytet Radomski, UR: Faculty of Materials Science, Technology and Design; Faculty of Mechanical Engineering; Faculty of Transport and Electrical Engineering; Faculty of Economics; Faculty of Computer Science and Mathematics; Faculty of Art; Faculty of Philology and Pedagogy; Faculty of Health Sciences and Physical Culture | Radom | 1950 |
| University of Rzeszów | Uniwersytet Rzeszowski, UR: Collegium Medicum; Faculty of Medicine; Faculty of Physical Culture Sciences; Faculty of Health Sciences and Psychology; Faculty of Biotechnology; Faculty of Biology, Nature Protection and Sustainable Development; Faculty of Economics and Finance; Faculty of Education and Philosophy; Faculty of Exact and Technical Sciences; Faculty of Fine Arts; Faculty of Humanities; Faculty of Law and Administration; Faculty of Music; Faculty of Philology; Faculty of Social Sciences; Faculty of Technology and Life Sciences | Rzeszów | 2001 |
| University of Silesia | Uniwersytet Śląski, UŚ: Faculty of Fine Arts and Music; Faculty of Biology and Environmental Protection; Faculty of Ethnology and Sciences of Education; Faculty of Philology; Faculty of Computer Science and Materials Science; Faculty of Mathematics, Physics and Chemistry; Faculty of Earth Sciences; Faculty of Social Sciences; Faculty of Pedagogy and Psychology; Faculty of Law and Administration; Faculty of Radio and Television; Faculty of Theology | Katowice | 1968 |
| University of Szczecin | Uniwersytet Szczeciński, US: Faculty of Humanities; Faculty of Law and Administration; Faculty of Physical, Mathematical and Natural Sciences; Faculty of Economics, Finance and Management; Faculty of Health and Physical Education; Faculty of Social Sciences; Faculty of Theology | Szczecin | 1945 |
| Nicolaus Copernicus University | Uniwersytet Mikołaja Kopernika w Toruniu, UMK: Ludwik Rydygier Collegium Medicum in Bydgoszcz; Faculty of Medicine; Faculty of Pharmacy; Faculty of Health Sciences; Faculty of Physics, Astronomy and Informatics; Faculty of Biological and Veterinary Sciences; Faculty of Economic Sciences and Management; Faculty of History; Faculty of Chemistry; Faculty of Earth Sciences and Spatial Management; Faculty of Philosophy and Social Sciences; Faculty of Fine Arts; Faculty of Humanities; Faculty of Law and Administration; Faculty of Mathematics and Computer Science; Faculty of Political Science and Security Studies; Faculty of Theology | Toruń | 1945 |
| University of Warsaw | Uniwersytet Warszawski, UW: 1. Liberal Arts; 2. Applied Linguistics; 3. Applied Social Sciences and Resocialization; 4. Biology; 5. Chemistry; 6. Economic Sciences; 7. Education; 8. Geography and Regional Studies; 9. Geology; 10. History; 11. Law and Administration; 12. Journalism, Information and Bibliology; 13. Management; 14. Mathematics, Informatics, and Mechanics; 15. Modern Languages; 16. Oriental Studies; 17. Philosophy and Sociology; 18. Physics; 19. Political Science and International Studies; 20. Polish Studies; 21. Psychology | Warsaw | 1816 |
| Cardinal Stefan Wyszyński University | Uniwersytet Stefana Wyszyńskiego, UKSW: Faculty of Theology; 1. Institute of Theology: theology, missiology, religious studies 2. Institute of Medial Education and Journalism: medial education and journalism, journalism and social communication 3. Theological Institute of Radom: theology; Faculty of Canon Law; 1. Canon law; Faculty of Family Studies; 1. Institute of Family Studies: family studies; Faculty of Christian Philosophy; 1. Institute of Philosophy: philosophy 2. Institute of Psychology: psychology 3. Institute of Ecology and Bioethics: ecology; Faculty of History and Social Sciences; 1. Institute of History: history, history of early Christian literature, musicology 2. Institute of Archeology: archeology 3. Institute of Political Science: political science, european studies 4. Institute of Sociology: sociology, economics, social work 5. Institute of History of Art: history of art; Faculty of Law and Administration; 1. Law, administration, international relations; Faculty of Humanistic Sciences; 1. Institute of Polish Philology: Polish philology, cultural studies, classical philology; Faculty of Mathematics and Natural Sciences; 1. Mathematics, computer science and econometry, physics, chemistry, macrofaculty (mathematics, chemistry, physics), computer science; Faculty of Biology and Environmental Sciences; 1. Biology, environmental engineering; Faculty of Pedagogy; 1. Pedagogy | Warsaw | 1954 |
| University of Wrocław | Uniwersytet Wrocławski, UWr: Faculty of Biotechnology; Faculty of Chemistry; Faculty of Philology; Faculty of Physics and Astronomy; Faculty of Mathematics and Computer Science; Faculty of Biological Sciences; Faculty of History and Pedagogy; Faculty of Earth and Environmental Sciences; Faculty of Social Sciences | Wrocław | 1702 |
| University of Zielona Góra | Uniwersytet Zielonogórski, UZ: Collegium Medicum — Faculty of Medicine and Health Sciences; Faculty of Arts; Faculty of Humanities; Faculty of Exact and Natural Sciences; Faculty of Engineering and Technical Sciences; Faculty of Social Sciences; Faculty of Legal and Economical Sciences | Zielona Góra | 2001 |
| Jan Kochanowski University | Uniwersytet Jana Kochanowskiego, UJK: Collegium Medicum; Faculty of Medicine; Faculty of Health Sciences; Faculty of Arts; Faculty of Humanities; Faculty of Law and Social Sciences; Faculty of Pedagogy and Psychology; Faculty of Exact and Natural Sciences | Kielce | 1969 |

Pictures of selected locations
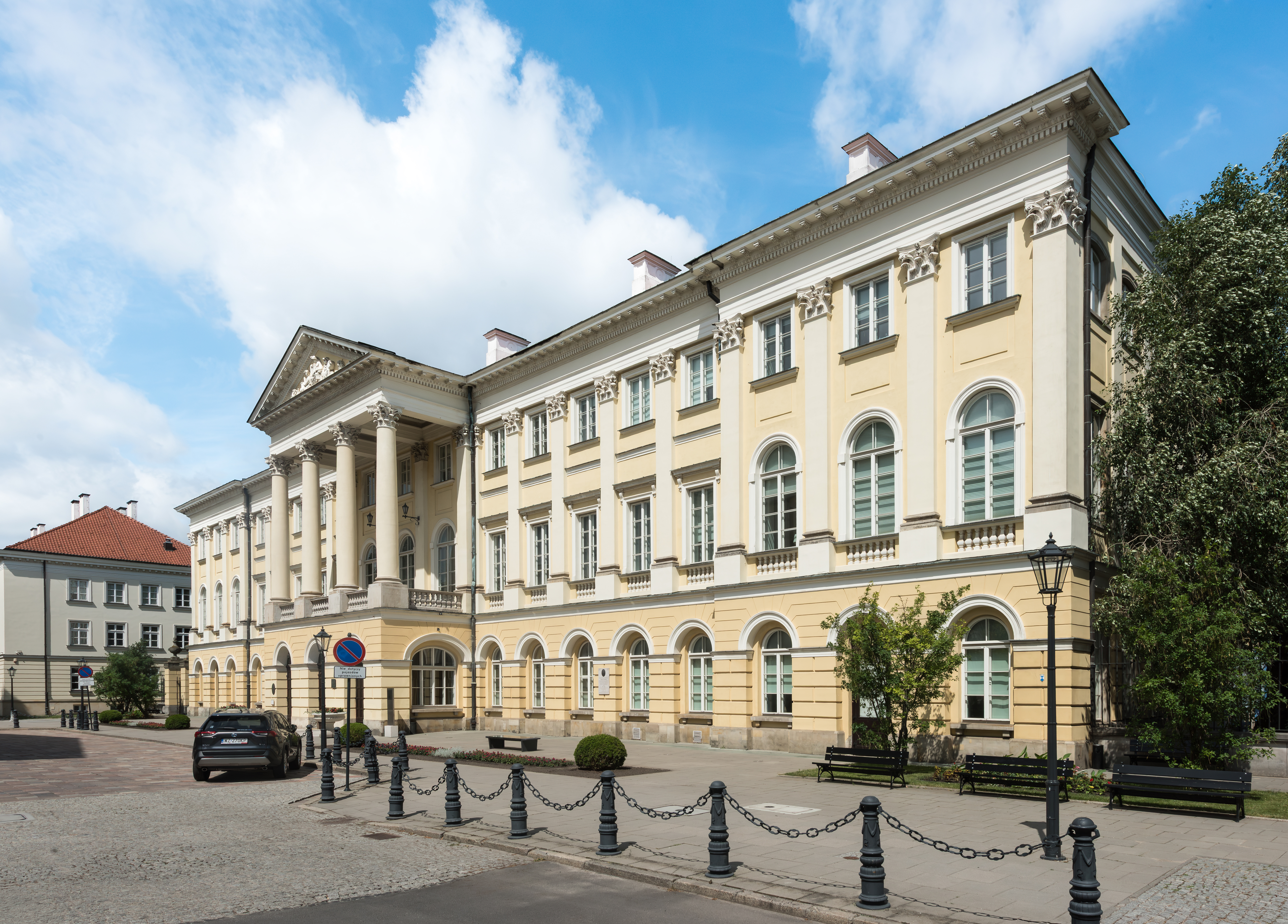
Rectorate of Warsaw University at Kazimierz Palace, Warsaw

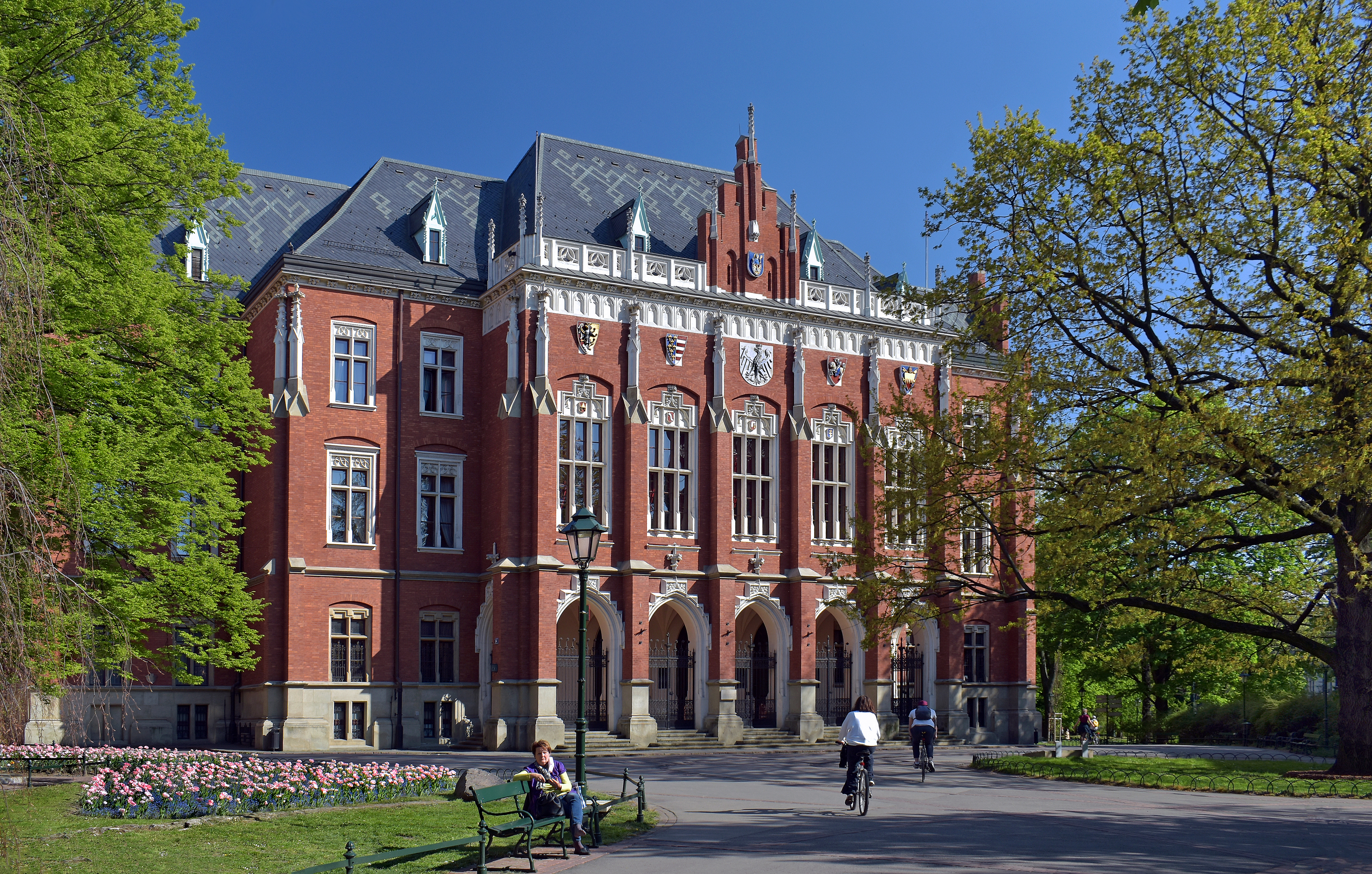
Jagiellonian University in Kraków, rectorate at Collegium Novum

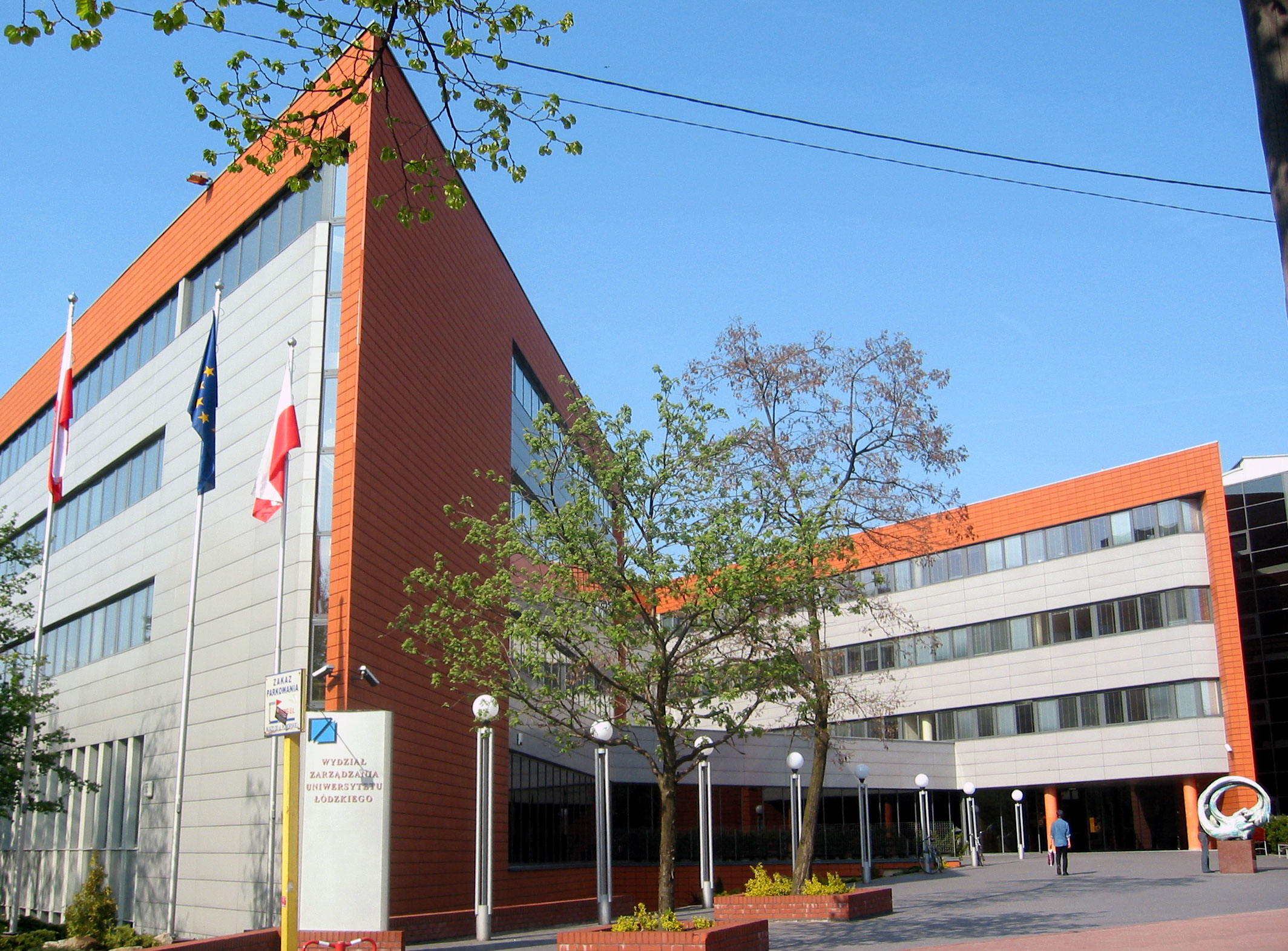
University of Łódź, Faculty of Management, Łódź

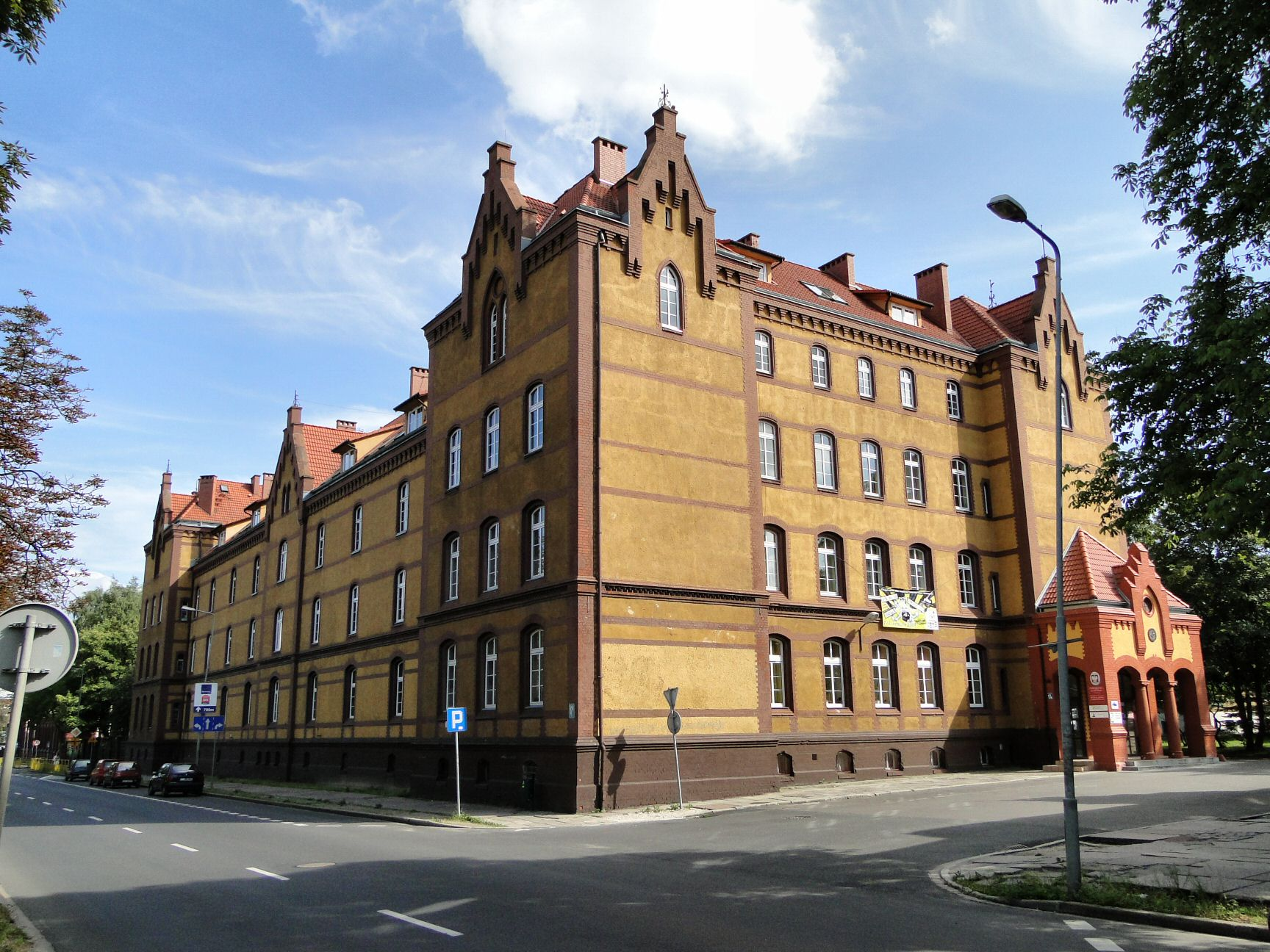
University of Szczecin, Law & Administration
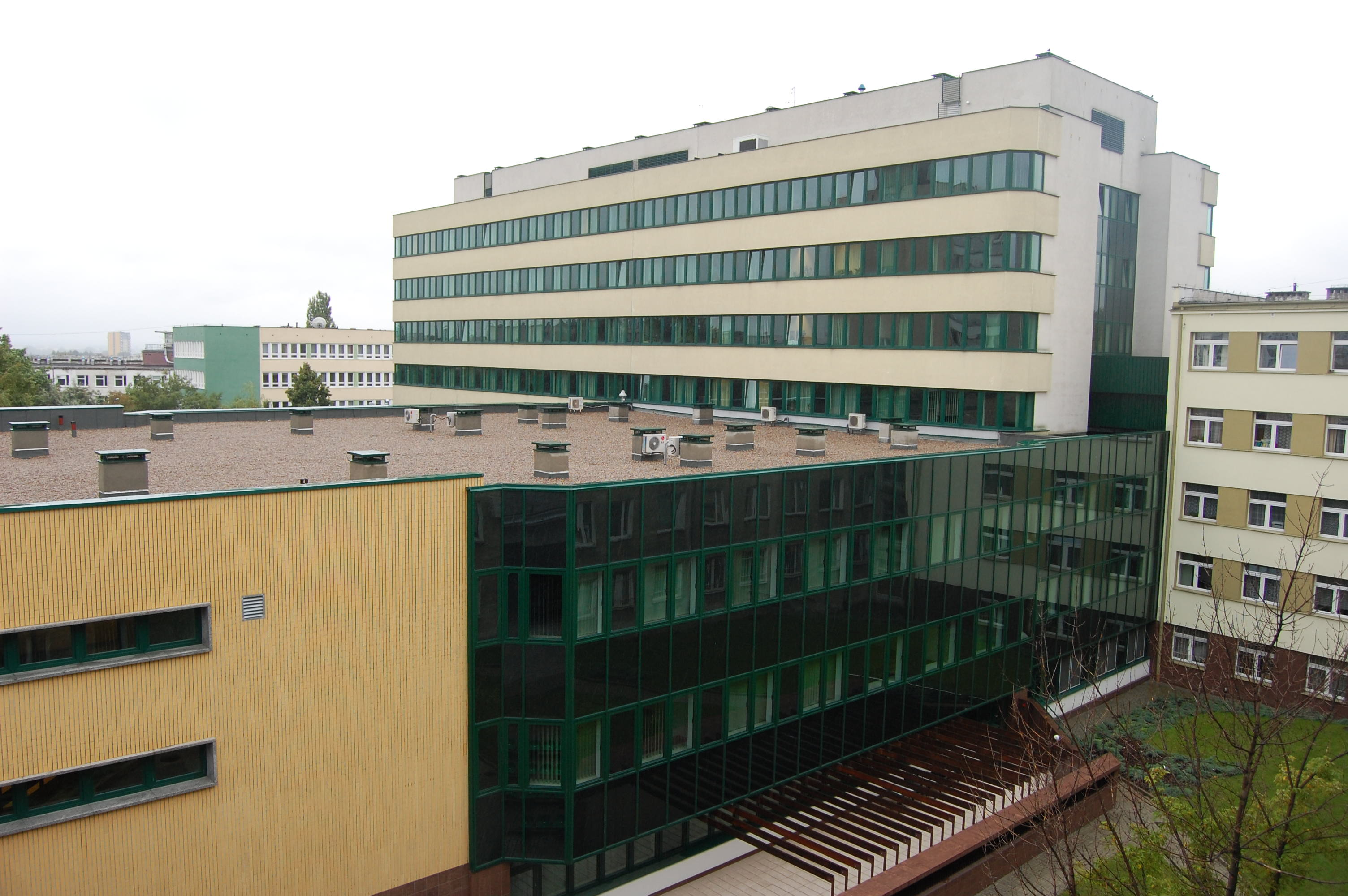
Aula of Maria Curie-Skłodowska University in Lublin

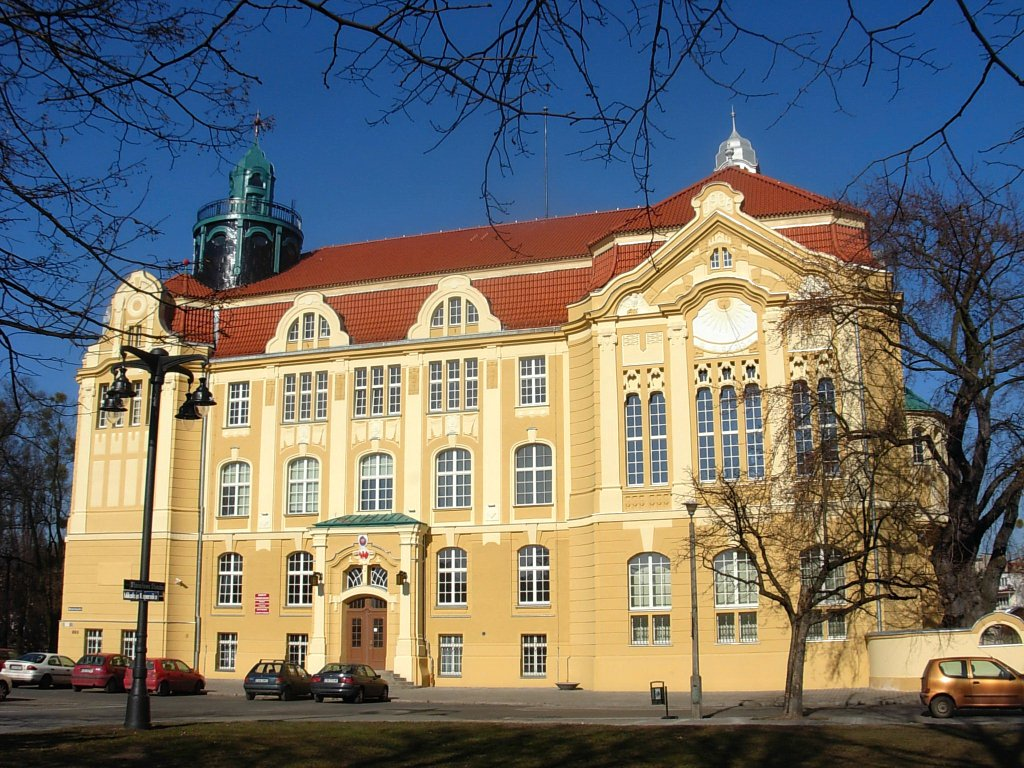
Casimir the Great University in Bydgoszcz, Copernicanum

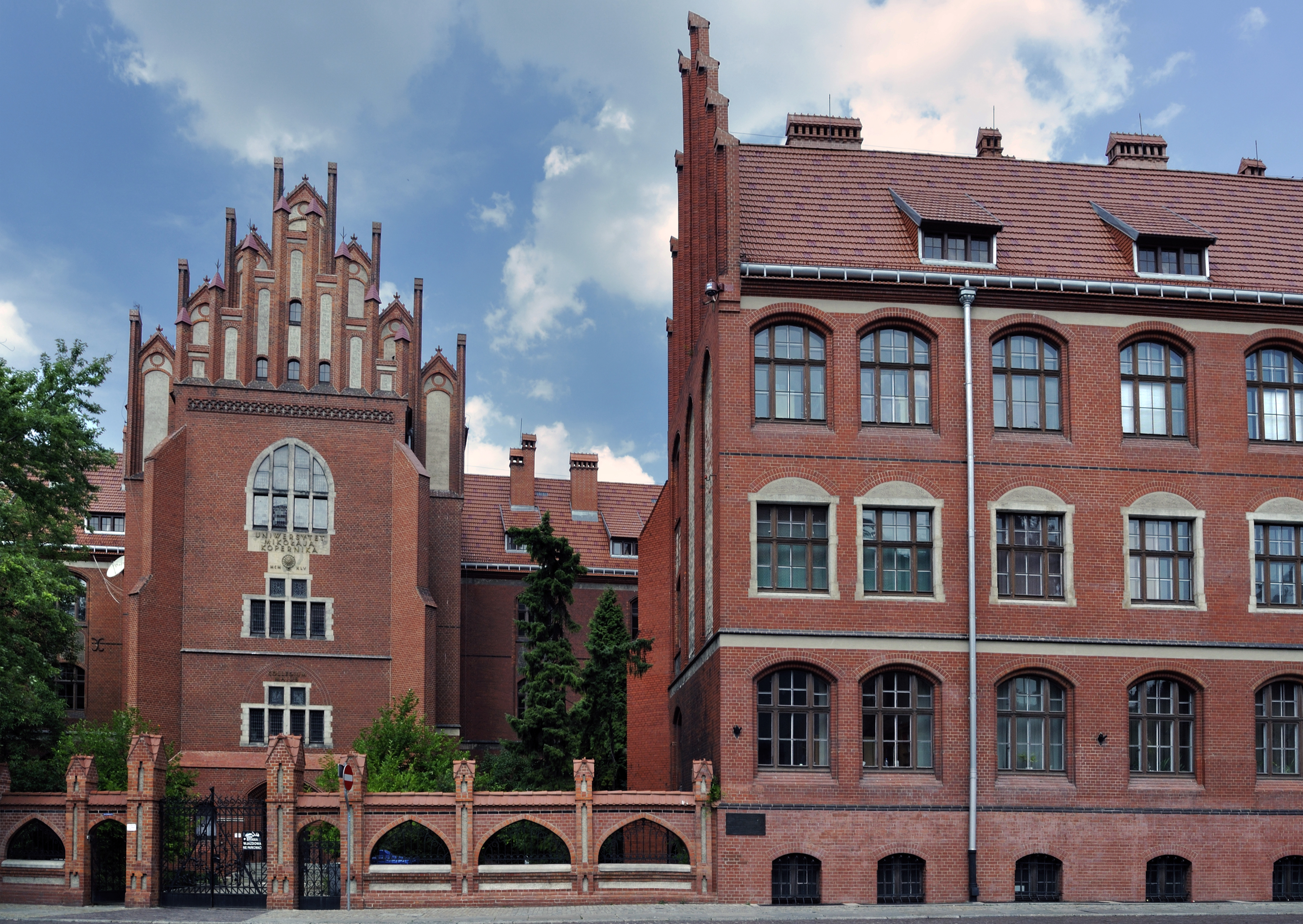
Nicolaus Copernicus University, Collegium Maius, Toruń

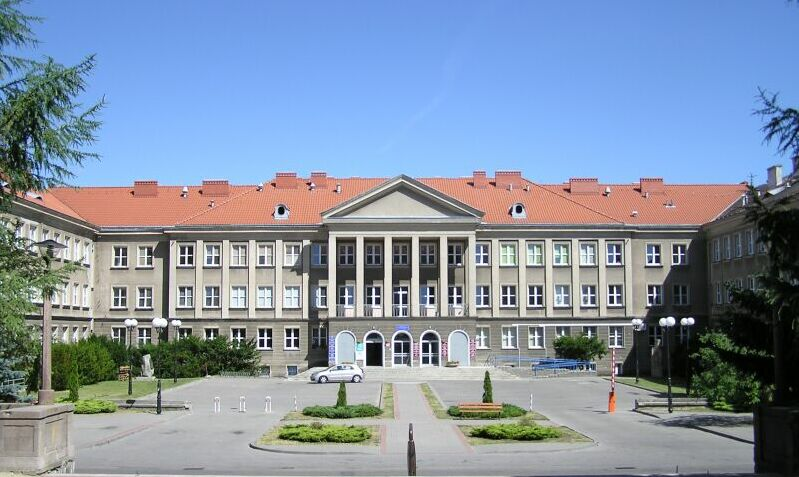
University of Warmia and Mazury in Olsztyn
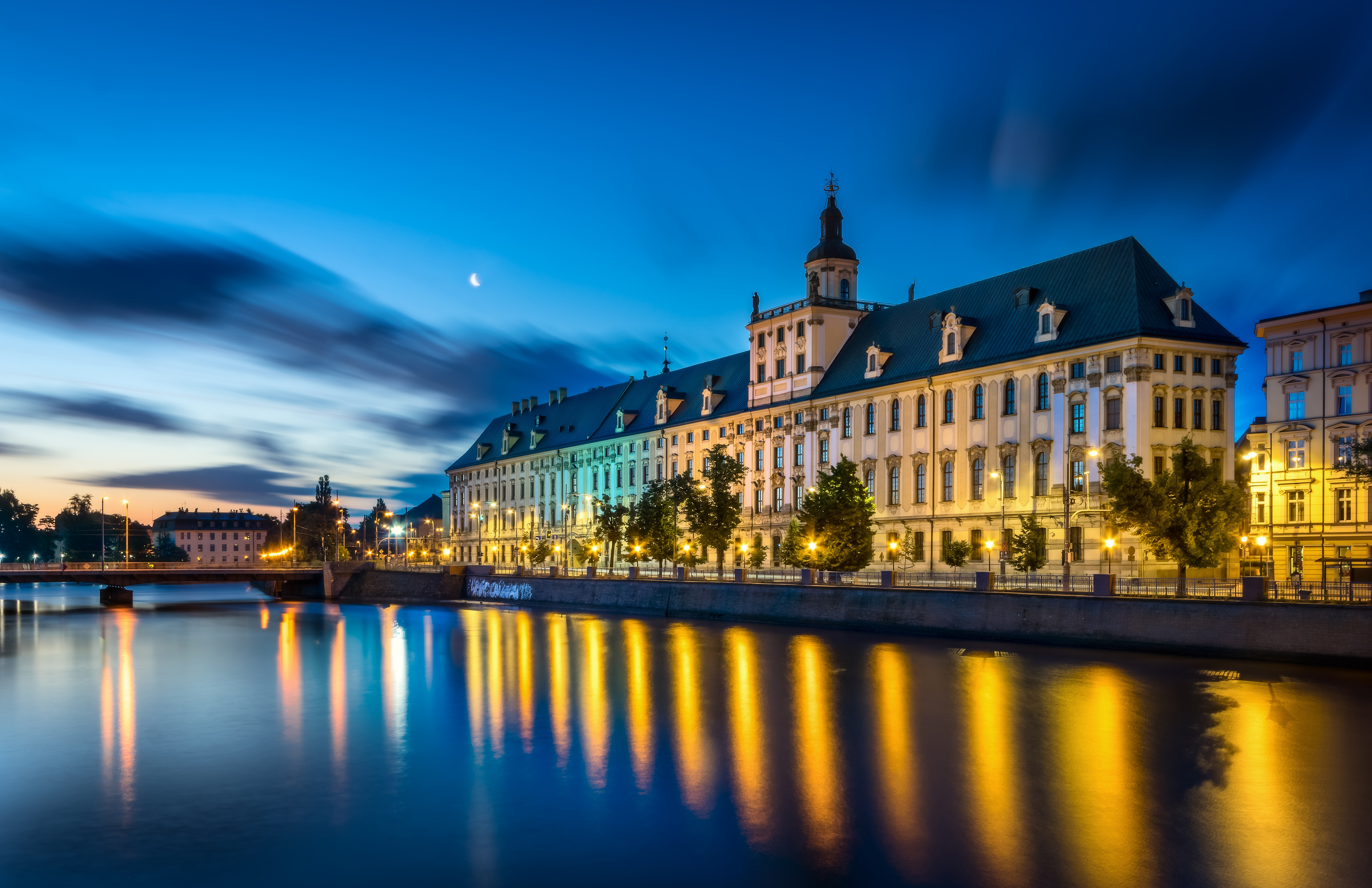
University of Wrocław main building in Wrocław

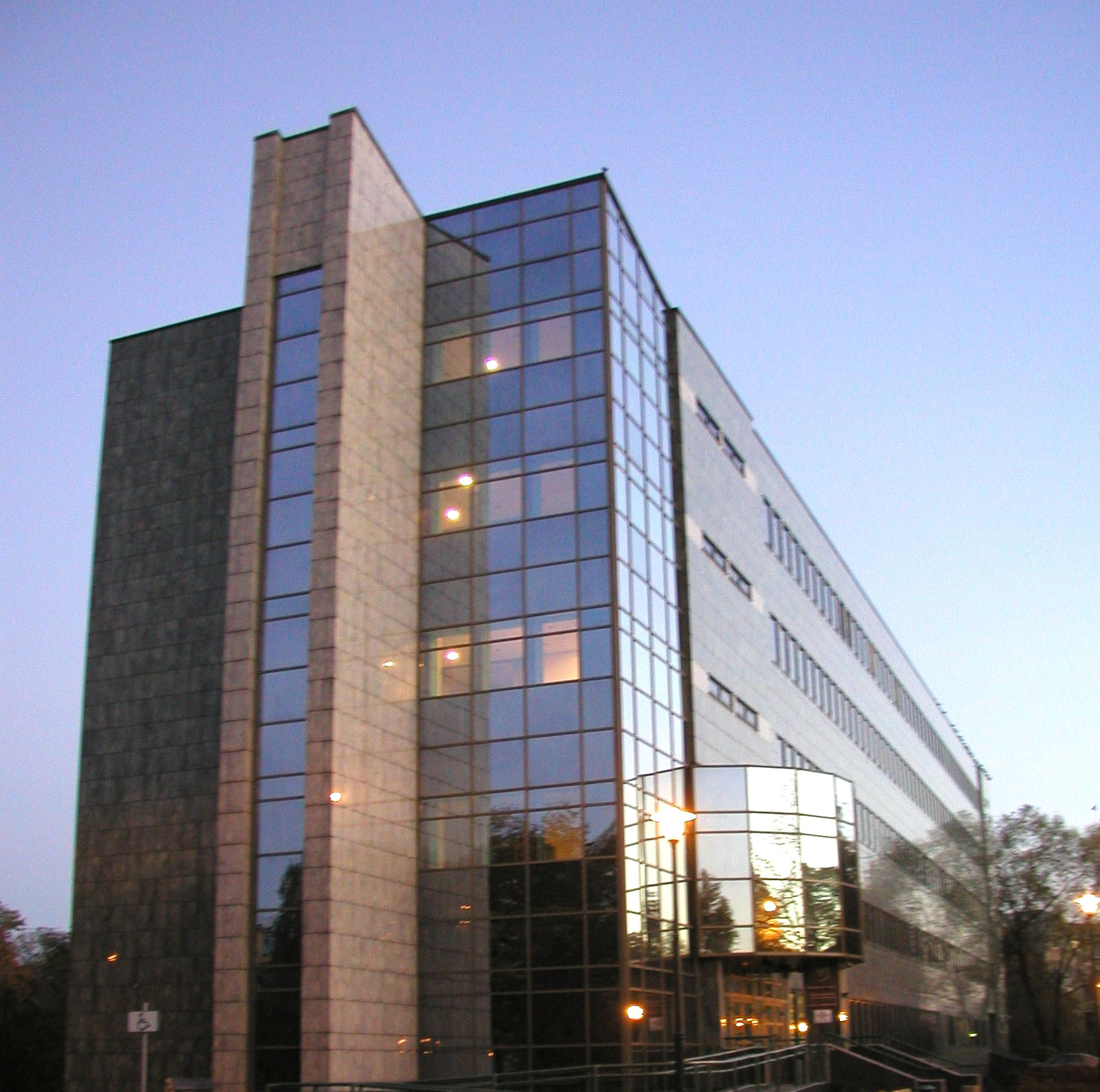
University of Silesia Faculty of Computer Science, Sosnowiec

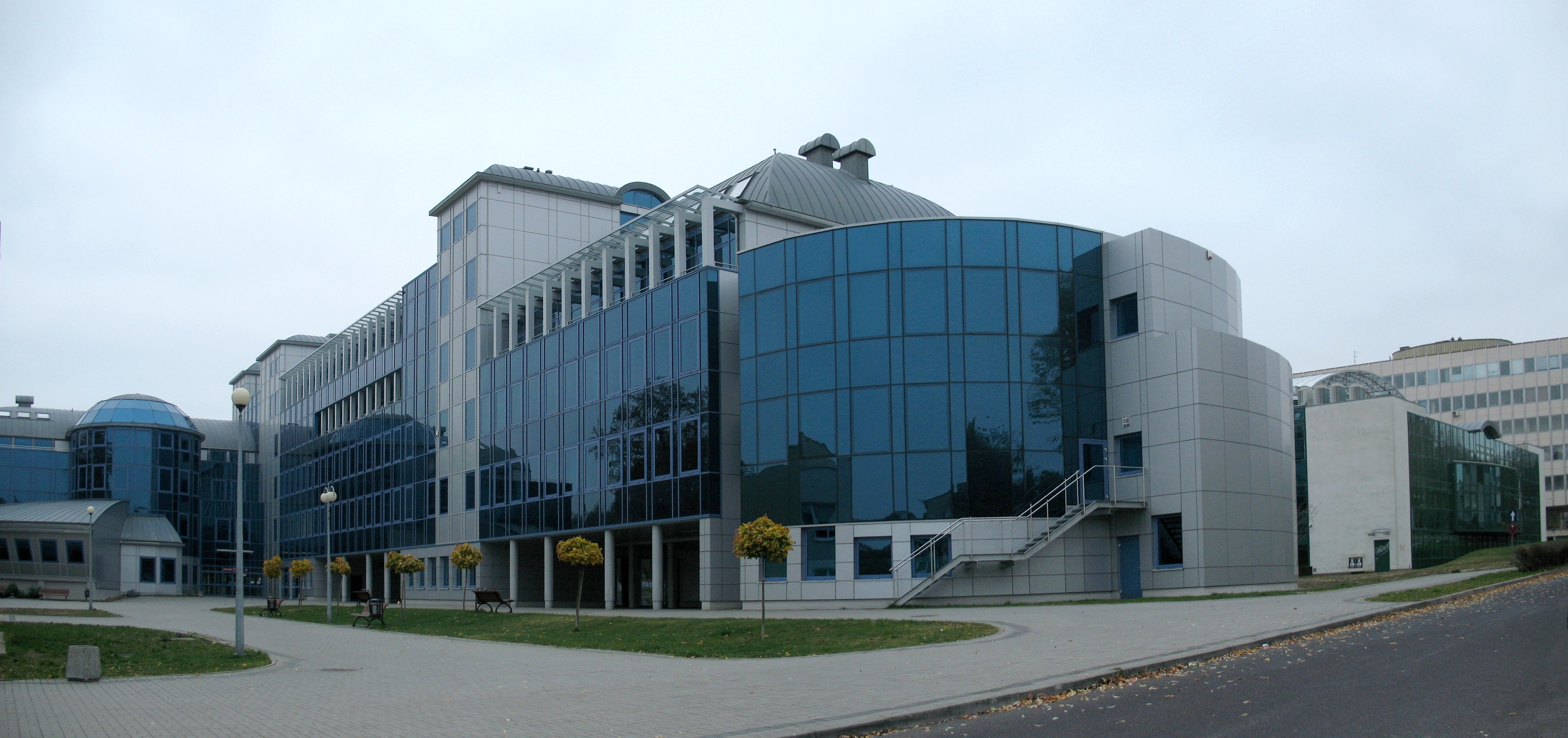
University of Zielona Góra Campus in Zielona Góra

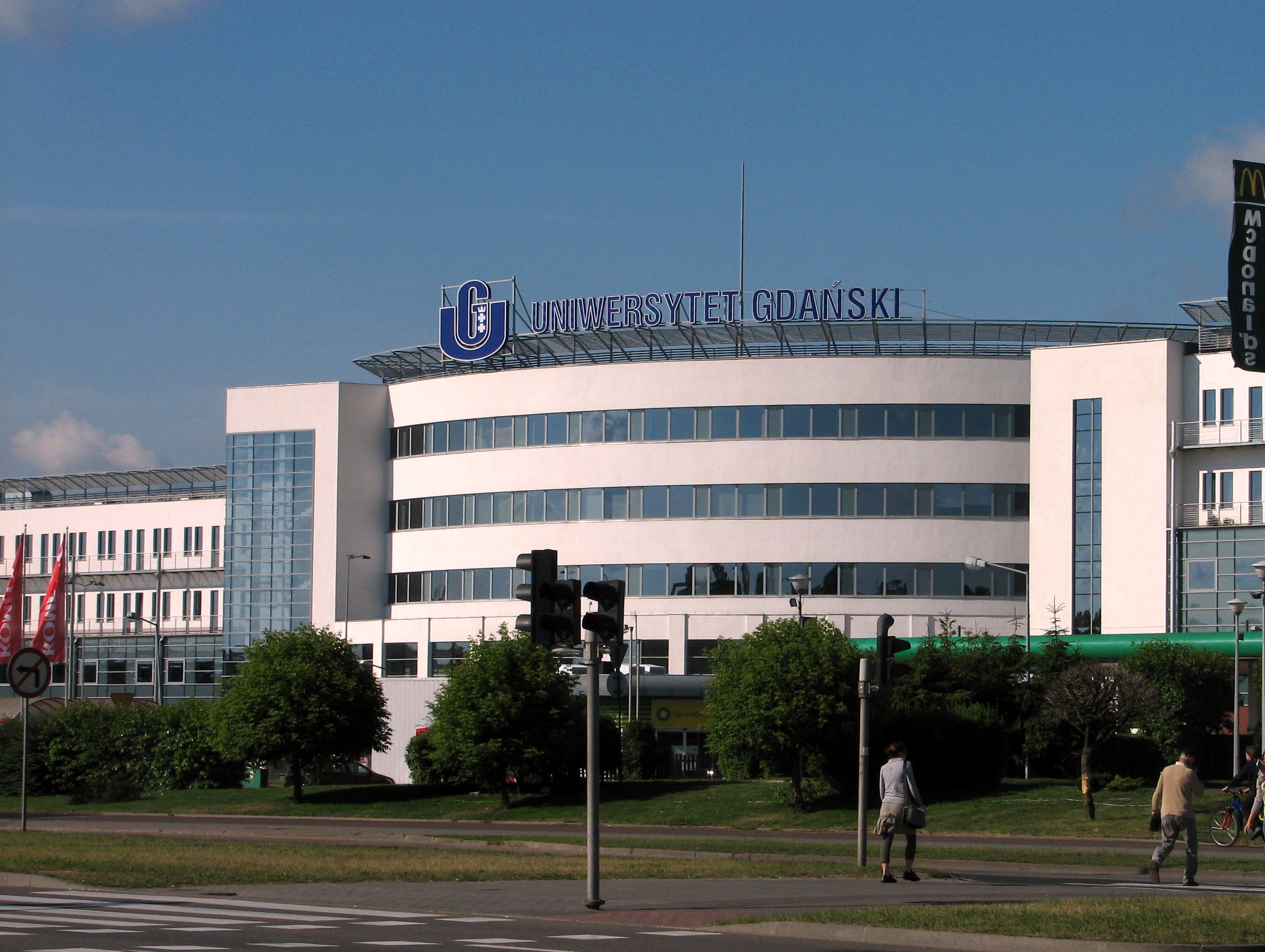
University of Gdańsk Faculty of Social Sciences, Gdańsk

=== Technical universities ===
- AGH University of Science and Technology in Kraków (Akademia Górniczo-Hutnicza, AGH)
- University of Bielsko-Biała (Akademia Techniczno-Humanistyczna w Bielsku-Białej, ATH)
- Białystok Technical University (Politechnika Białostocka, PB)
- Częstochowa University of Technology (Politechnika Częstochowska, PCz)
- Gdańsk University of Technology (Politechnika Gdańska, PG)
- Silesian University of Technology in Gliwice (Politechnika Śląska w Gliwicach, PŚl or Pol.Śl.)
- Kielce University of Technology (Politechnika Świętokrzyska, PSK)
- Koszalin University of Technology (Politechnika Koszalińska, PK)
- Lublin University of Technology (Politechnika Lubelska, PL)
- Łódź University of Technology (Politechnika Łódzka, PŁ)
- Opole University of Technology (Politechnika Opolska, PO)
- Poznań University of Technology (Politechnika Poznańska, PP)
- Rzeszów University of Technology (Politechnika Rzeszowska, PRz)
- Tadeusz Kościuszko University of Technology (Politechnika Krakowska, PK)
- West Pomeranian University of Technology (Zachodniopomorski Uniwersytet Technologiczny w Szczecinie, ZUT)
- Warsaw University of Technology (Politechnika Warszawska, PW)
- Wrocław University of Technology (Politechnika Wrocławska, PWr)

=== Business schools ===
- University of Economics in Katowice (Uniwersytet Ekonomiczny w Katowicach)
- Cracow University of Economics (Uniwersytet Ekonomiczny w Krakowie)
- Poznań University of Economics and Business (Uniwersytet Ekonomiczny w Poznaniu)
- Wrocław University of Economics (Uniwersytet Ekonomiczny we Wrocławiu)
- Warsaw School of Economics (Szkoła Główna Handlowa, SGH)

=== Teacher universities ===
- Academy of Special Education in Warsaw (Akademia Pedagogiki Specjalnej im. Marii Grzegorzewskiej w Warszawie)
- Jan Długosz University (Akademia im. Jana Długosza w Częstochowie)
- Pedagogical University of Cracow (Uniwersytet Pedagogiczny im. K.E.N. w Krakowie)
- Pomeranian Academy in Słupsk (Akademia Pomorska w Słupsku)

=== Life sciences ===
- University of Technology and Life Sciences in Bydgoszcz (Uniwersytet Technologiczno-Przyrodniczy w Bydgoszczy, UTP)
- Agricultural University of Kraków (Uniwersytet Rolniczy w Krakowie)
- University of Life Sciences in Lublin (Uniwersytet Przyrodniczy w Lublinie)
- University of Life Sciences in Poznań (Uniwersytet Przyrodniczy w Poznaniu)
- University of Natural Sciences and Humanities in Siedlce (Uniwersytet Przyrodniczo-Humanistyczny w Siedlcach)
- Warsaw University of Life Sciences (Szkoła Główna Gospodarstwa Wiejskiego, SGGW)
- Wroclaw University of Environmental and Life Sciences (Uniwersytet Przyrodniczy we Wrocławiu)

=== Colleges of physical education ===
- Józef Piłsudski University of Physical Education in Warsaw
- Gdańsk University of Physical Education and Sport (Akademia Wychowania Fizycznego i Sportu im. Jędrzeja Śniadeckieg)

== Specialist universities ==
=== Medical universities and colleges ===
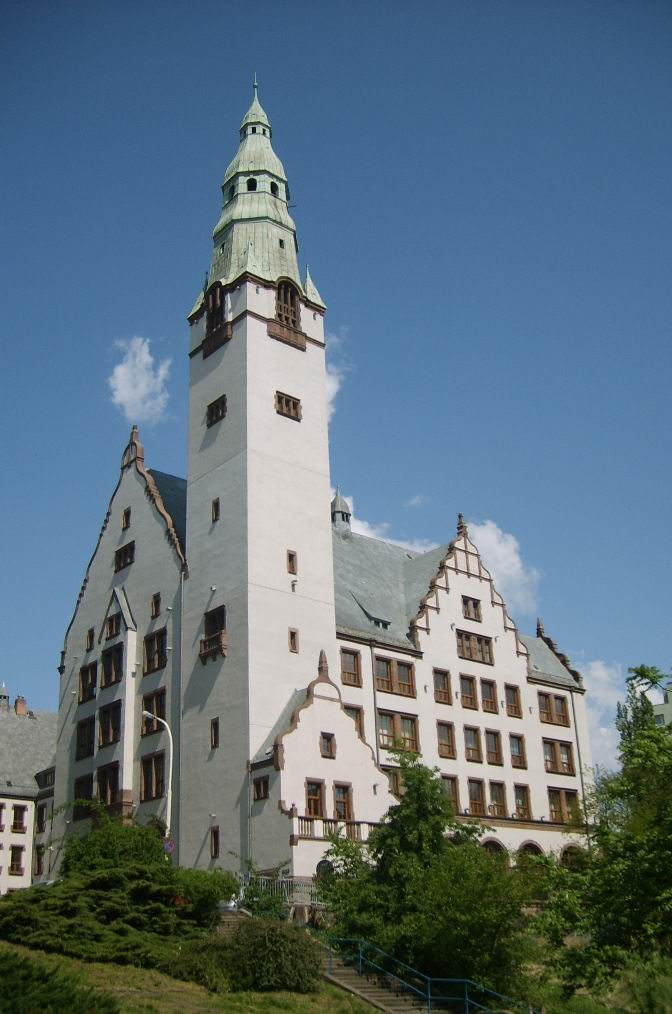
Pomeranian Medical University in Szczecin

- Jagiellonian University Medical College (Collegium Medicum Uniwersytetu Jagiellońskiego)
- Medical University of Białystok (Uniwersytet Medyczny w Białymstoku)
- Collegium Medicum in Bydgoszcz of the Nicolaus Copernicus University of Toruń (Collegium Medicum w Bydgoszczy Uniwersytetu Mikołaja Kopernika w Toruniu)
- Medical University of Gdańsk (Gdański Uniwersytet Medyczny)
- Medical University of Silesia in Katowice (Śląski Uniwersytet Medyczny w Katowicach)
- Medical University of Lublin (Uniwersytet Medyczny w Lublinie)
- Medical University of Łódź (Uniwersytet Medyczny w Łodzi)
- Poznań University of Medical Sciences (Uniwersytet Medyczny im. Karola Marcinkowskiego w Poznaniu)
- Pomeranian Medical University in Szczecin (Pomorski Uniwersytet Medyczny w Szczecinie)
- Medical University of Warsaw (Warszawski Uniwersytet Medyczny, WUM)
- Wrocław Medical University (Uniwersytet Medyczny we Wrocławiu)
- Collegium Medicum of the University of Warmia and Mazury in Olsztyn (Collegium Medicum Uniwersytetu Warmińsko-Mazurskiego w Olsztynie)
- Collegium Medicum of the University of Zielona Góra (Collegium Medicum Uniwersytetu Zielonogórskiego)

=== Academies of music ===
- Bydgoszcz Music Academy - "Feliks Nowowiejski" (Akademia Muzyczna im. Feliksa Nowowiejskiego w Bydgoszczy)
- Stanisław Moniuszko Academy of Music in Gdańsk (Akademia Muzyczna im. Stanisława Moniuszki w Gdańsku)
- University of Music in Katowice (Akademia Muzyczna w Katowicach)
- Academy of Music in Kraków (Akademia Muzyczna w Krakowie)
- Academy of Music in Łódź (Akademia Muzyczna im. Grażyny i Kiejstuta Bacewiczów w Łodzi)
- Academy of Music in Poznań (Akademia Muzyczna w Poznaniu)
- Fryderyk Chopin University of Music in Warsaw (Uniwersytet Muzyczny im. Fryderyka Chopina w Warszawie)
- Karol Lipiński University of Music in Wrocław (Akademia Muzyczna im. Karola Lipińskiego we Wrocławiu)

=== Academies of theatre and film ===
- The Aleksander Zelwerowicz National Academy of Dramatic Art in Warsaw
- Ludwik Solski Academy for the Dramatic Arts in Kraków
- National Film School in Łódź

=== Academies of fine arts ===
- Jan Matejko Academy of Fine Arts in Kraków
- Academy of Fine Arts in Warsaw
- Art Academy of Szczecin
- Eugeniusz Geppert Academy of Fine Arts in Wrocław
- University of Fine Arts in Poznań
- Academy of Fine Arts in Gdańsk
- Academy of Fine Arts in Katowice

=== Theological universities ===
- Pontifical University of John Paul II (Uniwersytet Papieski Jana Pawła II w Krakowie)
- John Paul II Catholic University of Lublin (Katolicki Uniwersytet Lubelski Jana Pawła II, KUL)
- Pontifical Faculty of Theology in Wrocław (Papieski Wydział Teologiczny we Wrocławiu)
- Cardinal Stefan Wyszyński University in Warsaw (from above) with particular sensitivity to Christian values

=== Maritime universities ===
- Gdynia Maritime University (Akademia Morska w Gdyni)
- Maritime University of Szczecin (Akademia Morska w Szczecinie)

=== Military universities ===
- War Studies University (Akademia Sztuki Wojennej)
- Polish Air Force Academy in Dęblin (Wyższa Szkoła Oficerska Sił Powietrznych)
- Military University of Technology in Warsaw (Wojskowa Akademia Techniczna im. Jarosława Dąbrowskiego, WAT)
- Tadeusz Kościuszko Land Forces Military Academy in Wrocław (Wyższa Szkoła Oficerska Wojsk Lądowych im. gen. Tadeusza Kościuszki)
- Polish Naval Academy in Gdynia (Akademia Marynarki Wojennej)

== Non-public universities ==
- Kozminski University (Akademia Leona Koźmińskiego)
- SWPS University in Warsaw (SWPS Uniwersytet Humanistycznospołeczny)

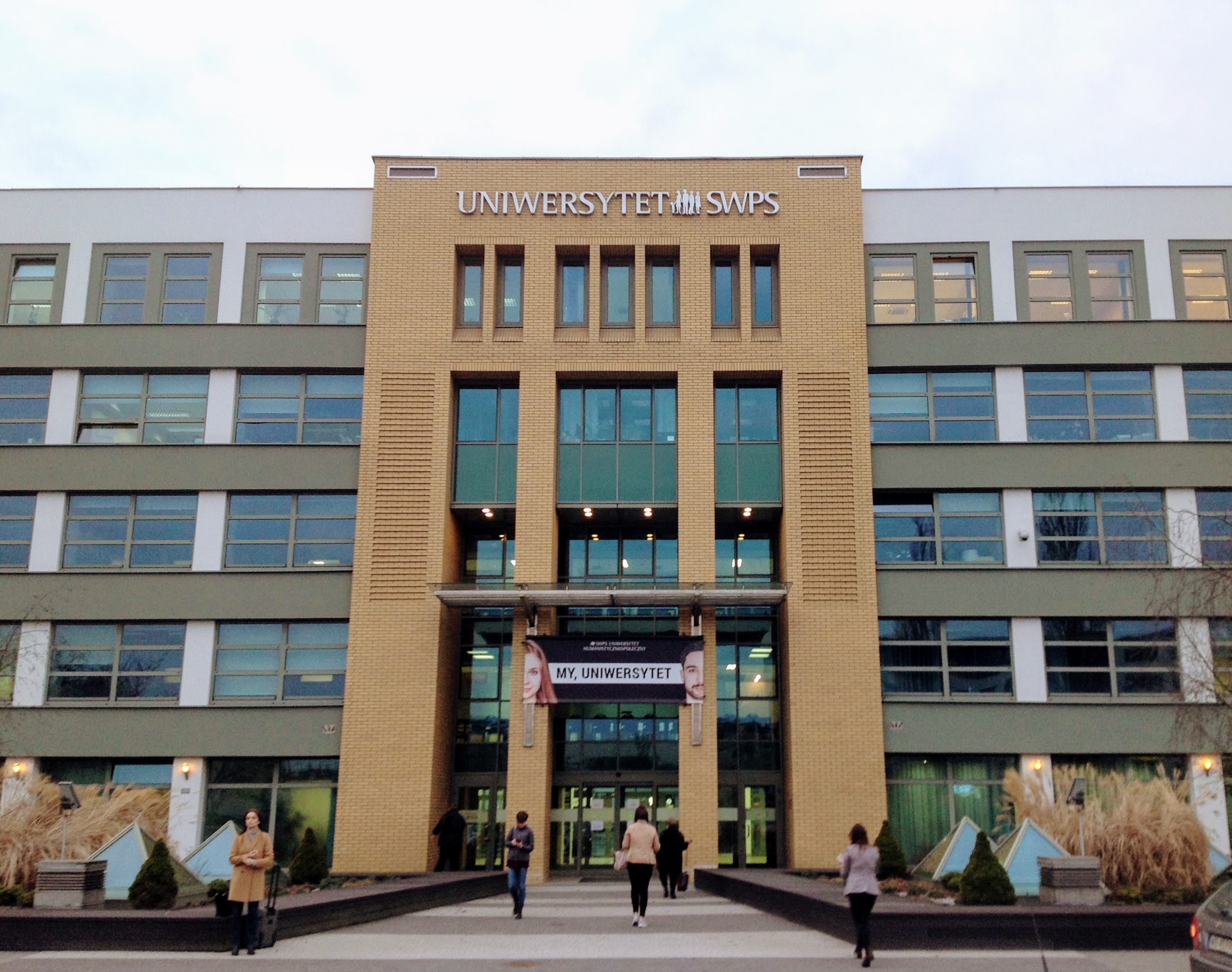
SWPS University of Social Sciences and Humanities

- VIZJA University (Uniwersytet VIZJA), previously the University of Economics and Human Sciences in Warsaw
- Wyższa Szkoła Przedsiębiorczości i Administracji w Lublinie
- Wyższa Szkoła Prawa (University of Law)
- Prywatna Wyższa Szkoła Nauk Społecznych
- Akademia Jagiellońska w Toruniu
- Warszawska Akademia Medyczna
- WSB University in Dąbrowa Górnicza (Akademia WSB, previously Wyższa Szkoła Biznesu w Dąbrowie Górniczej, WSB)

== Former universities and colleges in Poland ==
- Lubrański Academy (established in 1518)
- Collegium Hosianum founded in 1565
- Jesuit College in Polotsk
- Akademia Zamojska (1594–1784)
- Politechnika Lwowska, now Lviv Polytechnic in Ukraine
- Wilno University, now Vilnius University in Lithuania
- Lwów University, now Lviv University
- Collegium Nobilium (Warsaw) founded in 1740
- Collegium Nobilium (Jesuit) in Warsaw founded in 1752
- Corps of Cadets (Warsaw), the first state college in the Polish–Lithuanian Commonwealth, 1765
- Jazłowiec College for girls, founded in 1863
- Jesuit College in Khyriv for boys founded in 1886
- Jesuit Collegium in Poznań
- Agricultural University of Szczecin (Akademia Rolnicza w Szczecinie), now part of West Pomeranian University of Technology
- Szczecin University of Technology (Politechnika Szczecińska, PS), now part of West Pomeranian University of Technology
- Wyższa Szkoła Wojenna Academy, 1919, now War Studies University
- Nauczycielskie Kolegium Języków Obcych in Sieradz, a teacher training college between 1990 and 2015

== See also ==
- Education in Poland
- List of universities and colleges in Kraków
- Open access in Poland
- Underground Education in Poland During World War II
- List of colleges and universities by country

== Notes and references ==
- Official register of educational institutions by type (Wykaz szkół i placówek oświatowych według typów). Centrum Informatyczne Edukacji, 30 September 2016. (in Polish)
