= Bastion Sakwowy =

Elevated pavilion in Wrocław, Poland

Bastion Sakwowy Saddlebag Bastion
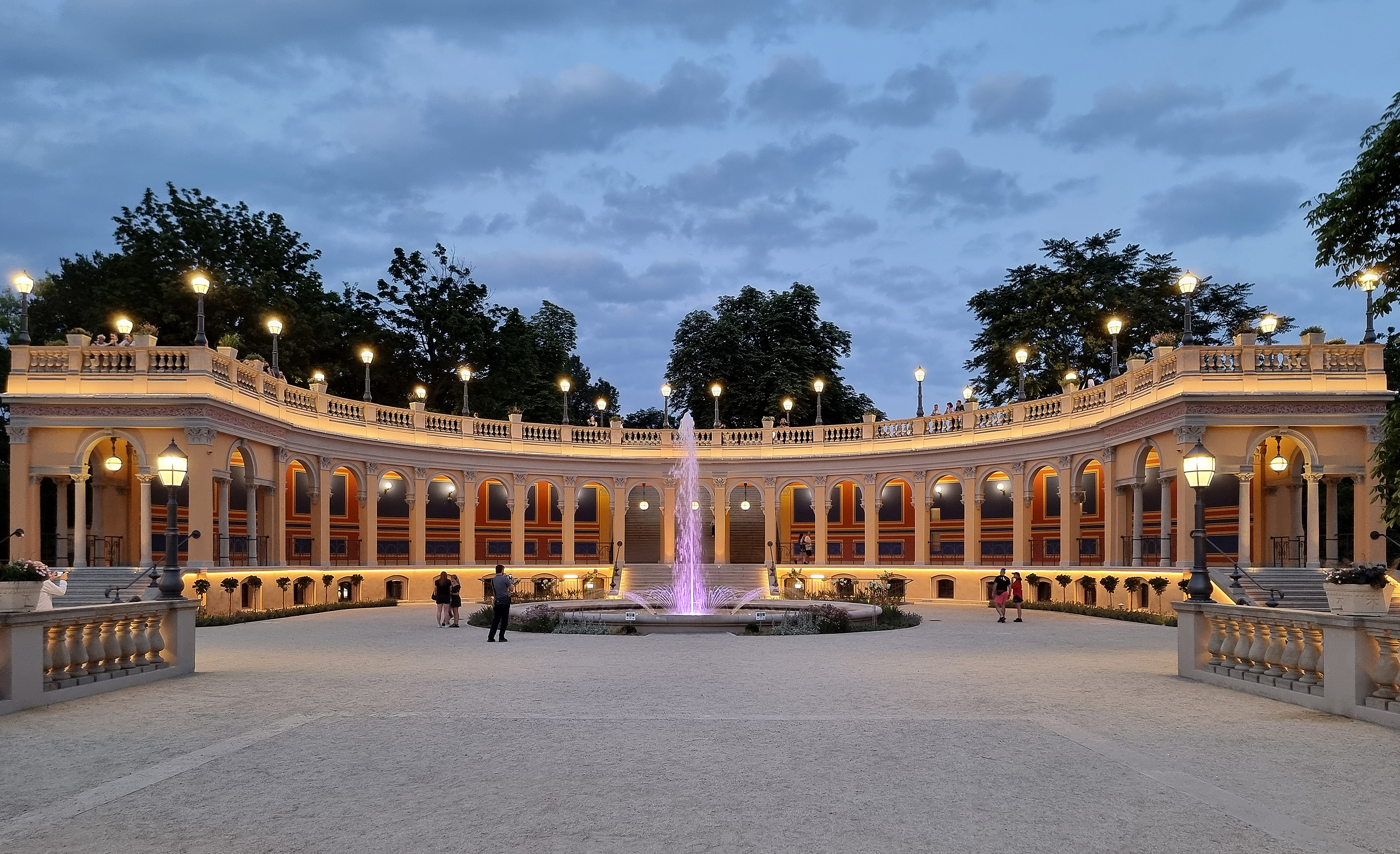
- Bastion Sakwowy at dusk, 2024
- Interactive map of the Bastion Sakwowy; Saddlebag Bastion area

General information
- Location: 18a Piotra Skargi Street, Wrocław, Poland (50-082)
- Coordinates: 51°06′17″N 17°02′18″E
- Elevation: 132 m (433 ft)
- Completed: 12 September 1867
- Renovated: 2022–2024
- Demolished: 1945 (partially)

Design and construction
- Architects: Karl Schmidt; Johann Friedrich Knorr

Bastion Sakwowy (English: Saddlebag Bastion; German: Taschenbastion), formerly known as Partisans' Hill (1948–2024, Polish: Wzgórze Partyzantów), is a fragment of the former city fortifications and an elevated pavilion in Wrocław, Poland. Situated on the south-east corner of Old Town, at the moat, it is a small mound topped by an architectural belvedere compound from 1867 and a fountain that overlooks the nearby surroundings.

== Names ==
The contemporary Polish appellation to the place, Bastion Sakwowy, was derived from a city gate of the same name that stood nearby. The Polish term "sakwa" and German "taschen" denote a saddlebag, pouch or purse, and correspond to the craftsmen and pursemakers whose workshops once occupied the area in the Middle Ages.

From 1867 to 1945 it was officially known as Liebichshöhe, or Liebich's Mound, named after the brothers who sponsored its construction. Following the Second World War, the Polish inhabitants colloquially named the place Wzgórze Miłości (Hill of Love) and subsequently Wzgórze Partyzantów (Partisans' Hill), the latter of which remained in official use from 1948 to 2024.

== History ==
The city's fortification and walls date back to the medieval period. However, with the use increased use of gunpowder and artillery, there was a need for a fortified corner outpost where cannons could be placed. In 1571, Hans Schneider von Lindau was employed with the task of constructing a bastion with casemate. He previously worked on the defensive systems in Gdańsk (Danzig) and Elbląg (Elbing). In 1593, the bastion was equipped with an artillery magazine, and gained outworks and a counterguard by the 18th century. The city walls proved to be a strong asset for Wrocław (then known as Breslau), which successfully defended itself until the beginning of the 19th century, with the dawn of new warfare and tactics. During the Napoleonic Wars, the city was besieged by Jerome Bonaparte and surrendered on 7 January 1807. The French occupying force, headed by Dominique Vandamme, ordered the demolition of all defences as an act of humiliation. In long-term, the aim was to prevent a rebellion that could potentially utilise the fortifications in their struggle against the French.

The demolition lasted until 1838. In 1849, the city established a committee tasked with developing the empty plots of land into a promenade along the remaining moat. The works were funded by two wealthy brothers – Gustav and Adolf Liebich. Following Gustav's abrupt death, Adolf decided to commemorate his elder brother by erecting a grand monument on top of what remained after the bastion was demolished. Johann Friedrich Knorr was tasked with creating an artificial hamlet or hill where the planned monument was to be placed. The new belvedere-styled pavilion was designed by Karl Schmidt and comprised three levels – the first was an atrium with access to the street; the second was a terrace situated on the roof of the atrium with a large fountain in the centre, surrounded by an arched colonnade and two pavilions; the third highest deck was occupied by a 3-storey domed watchtower topped with a statue of the mythological Victoria. The statue was an exact replica of the one made for the Victory Column in Berlin.

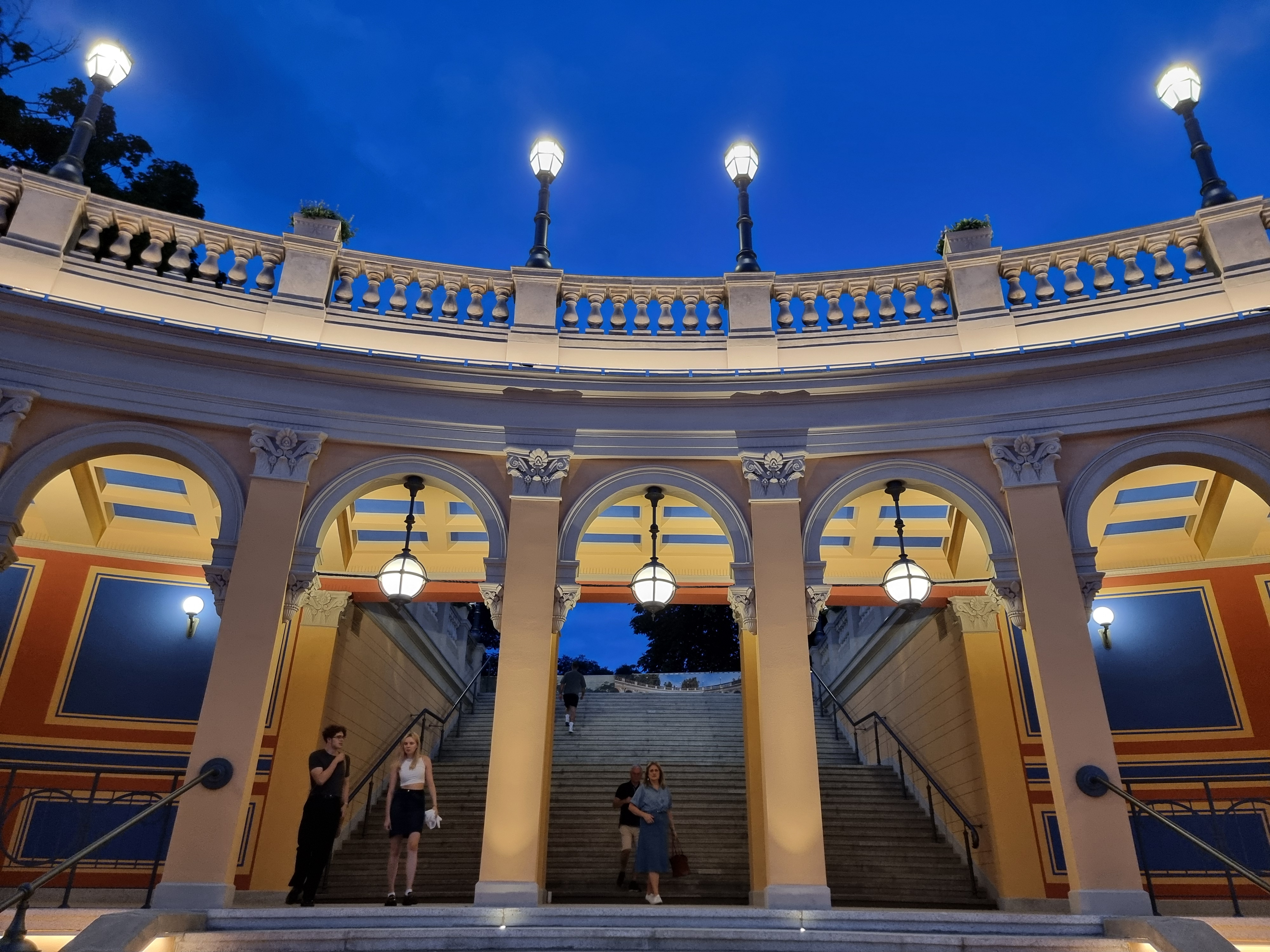
Architectural detail of the colonnade and grand staircase.

The monument became popular with the city's population, which ventured to the hill for recreational and health purposes; the pavilions acted as a resort or spa where fresh mineral water and various types of milk were offered to patients or passersby. In 1888, the city council permitted the consumption of alcoholic beverages, chiefly beer, which was met with some protest. The grandeur of the bastion came to an end in 1942, when it was decided to convert the casemates into air raid shelters. During the Second World War, under Festung Breslau, the city's defense staff was located beneath the monument. As a result, the hill became a target for bombs and artillery fire. In 1945, the defense staff was relocated elsewhere, however, the domed 3-storey watchtower was destroyed and not reconstructed after the war.

Under the Polish People's Republic, the hill once again became a popular spot for major events, parties and dancing despite the progressive neglect. On 10 May 1967, during juwenalia for students, a part of the colonnade steps collapsed, killing one and seriously injuring several others. It was left unattended for years; in 1970 it was listed in the Registry of Cultural Property and renovated between 1973 and 1974, though falling into disuse soon-after. With the fall of communism in 1989, the monument became private property under a 40-year lease contract. It then housed the "Reduta" nightclub, a casino, and various restaurants. Petty crime in the area was commonplace. Due to the severe neglect caused by the owner in subsequent years, the city's government ended the lease terms earlier and expropriated the site in 2017. Between 2022 and 2024, a major restoration took place and Bastion Sakwowy regained much of its 19th-century appearance and splendour.

== Geography ==
The suburb is characterised by flat topography and the man-made mound is an outlier providing a view of the surrounding environs, including a panorama of Skargi and Teatralna streets, the Sky Tower skyscraper, the Wrocław Opera, the Old Bath House and certain 19th-century tenements. The hill rises approximately 132 metres (433 ft) above sea level. The mound was once covered by dense shrubs and deciduous trees planted along the moat, which obstructed the view of the southern and eastern parts of the city during the summer season.

== Architecture ==
At the time of its completion, the complex was variously described as Renaissance Revival or Neoclassical in architectural form. It was encircled by an English garden. The cost of the undertaking by Adolf Liebich alone was equivalent to 71,000 thalers, which was more than double the city's annual budget.

The most recent renovation prompted a return to the more bright and eccentric colours that were used originally for the exterior in the 19th century, including Prussian blue, red, orange and yellow.

== Gallery ==
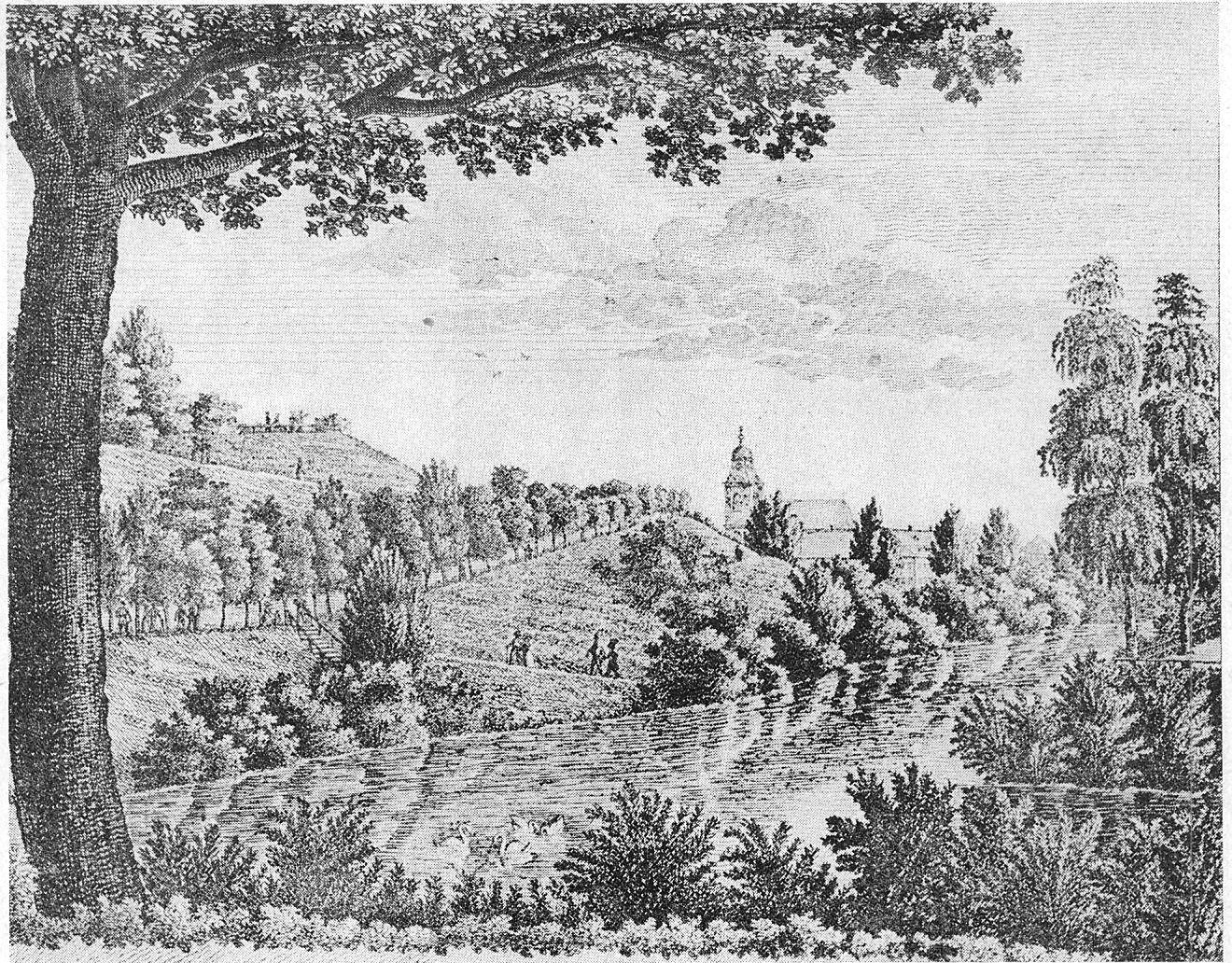
The undeveloped area before 1867.

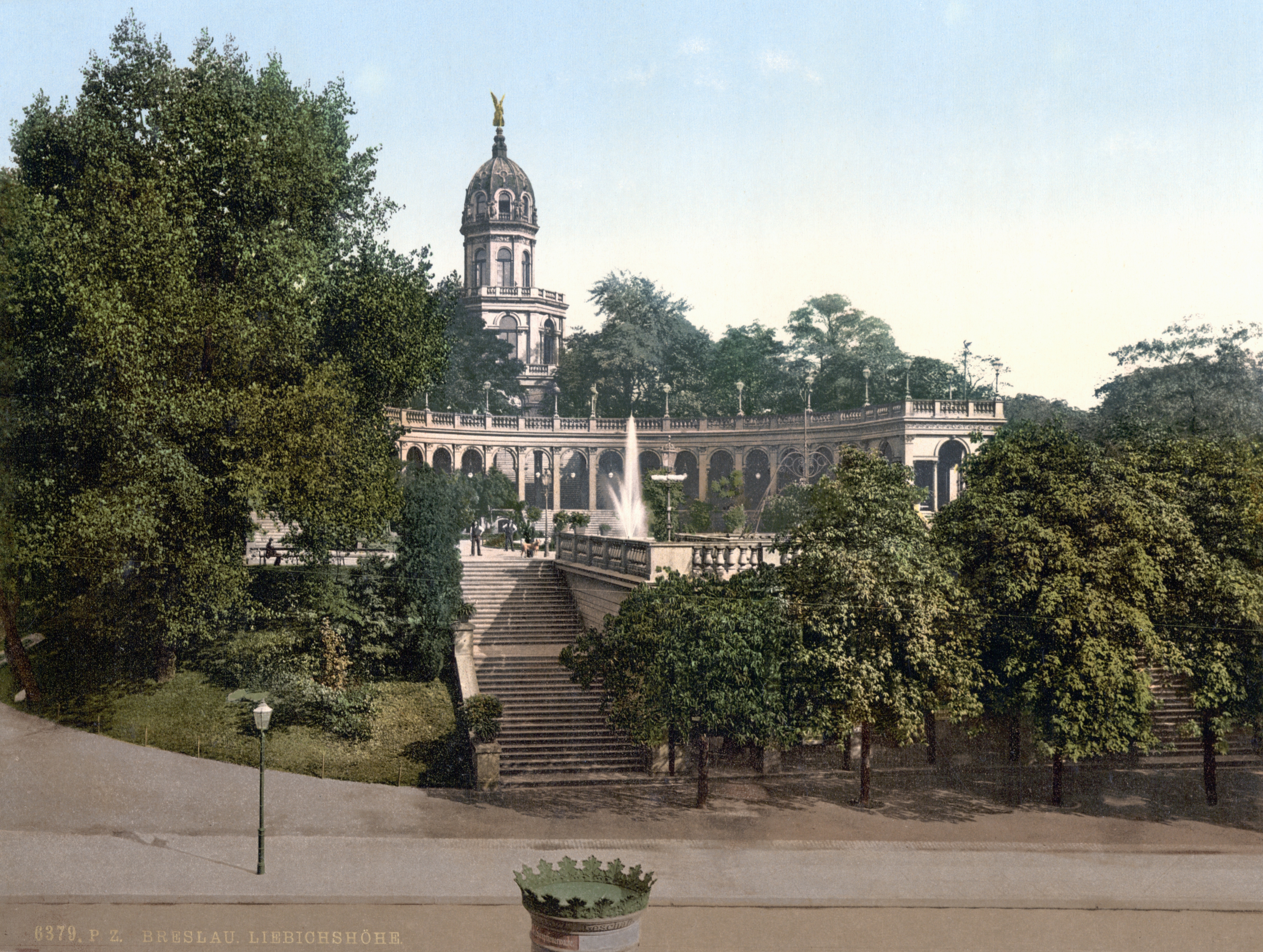
The Liebichshöhe on a postcard, 1890s

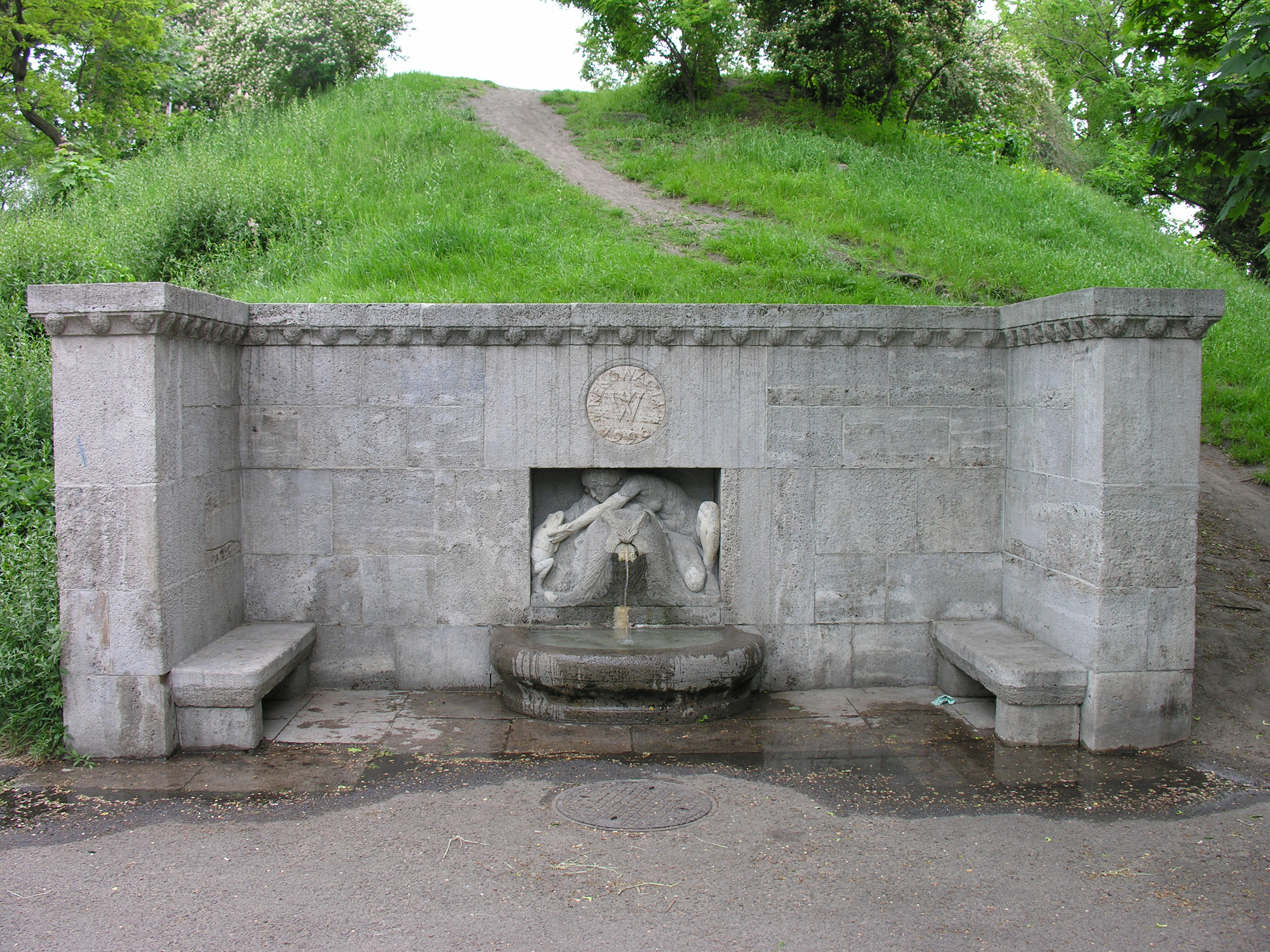
Gustav Freytag's smaller fountain, 2006

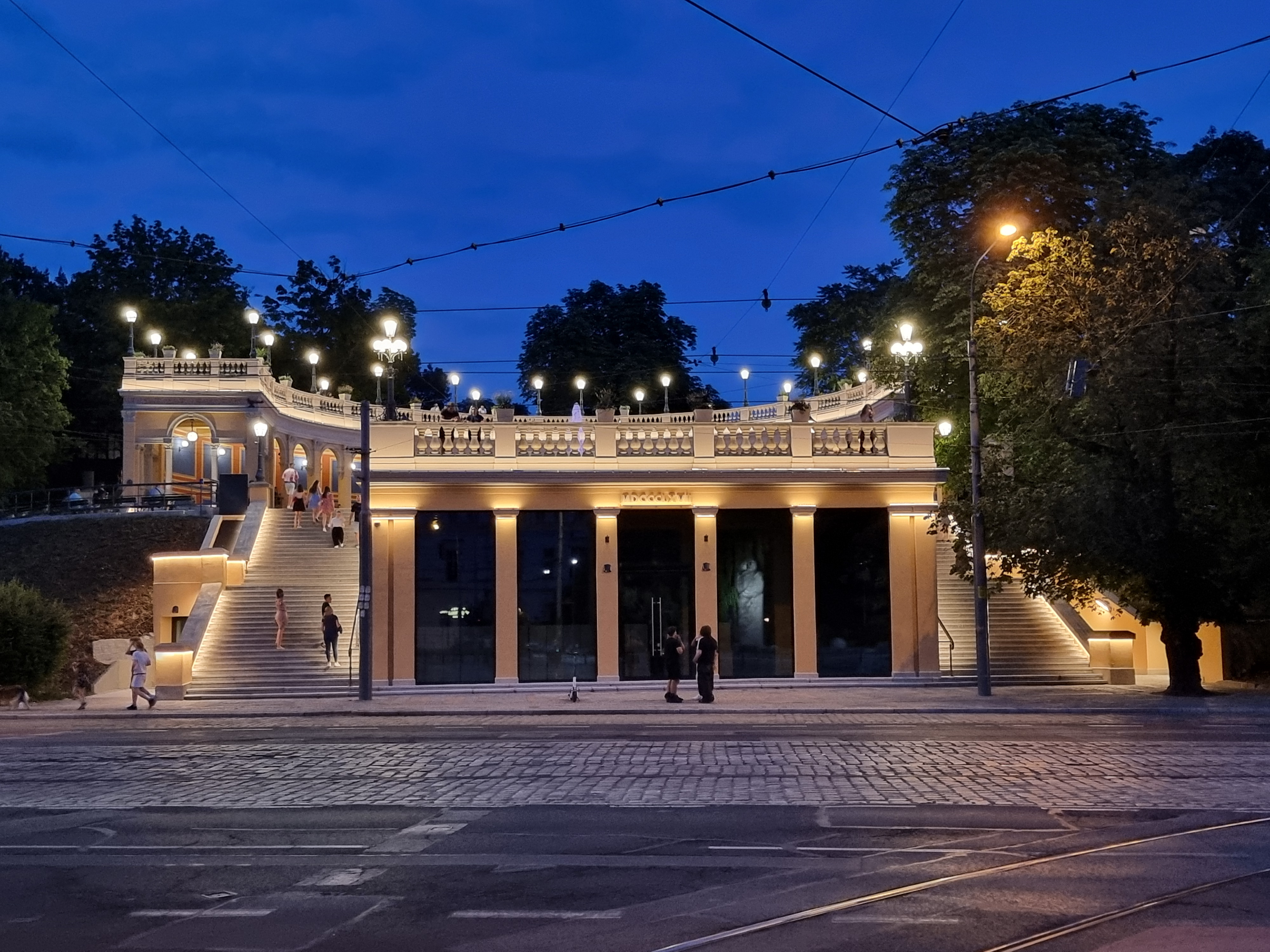
Streetview of the monument at dusk, 2024

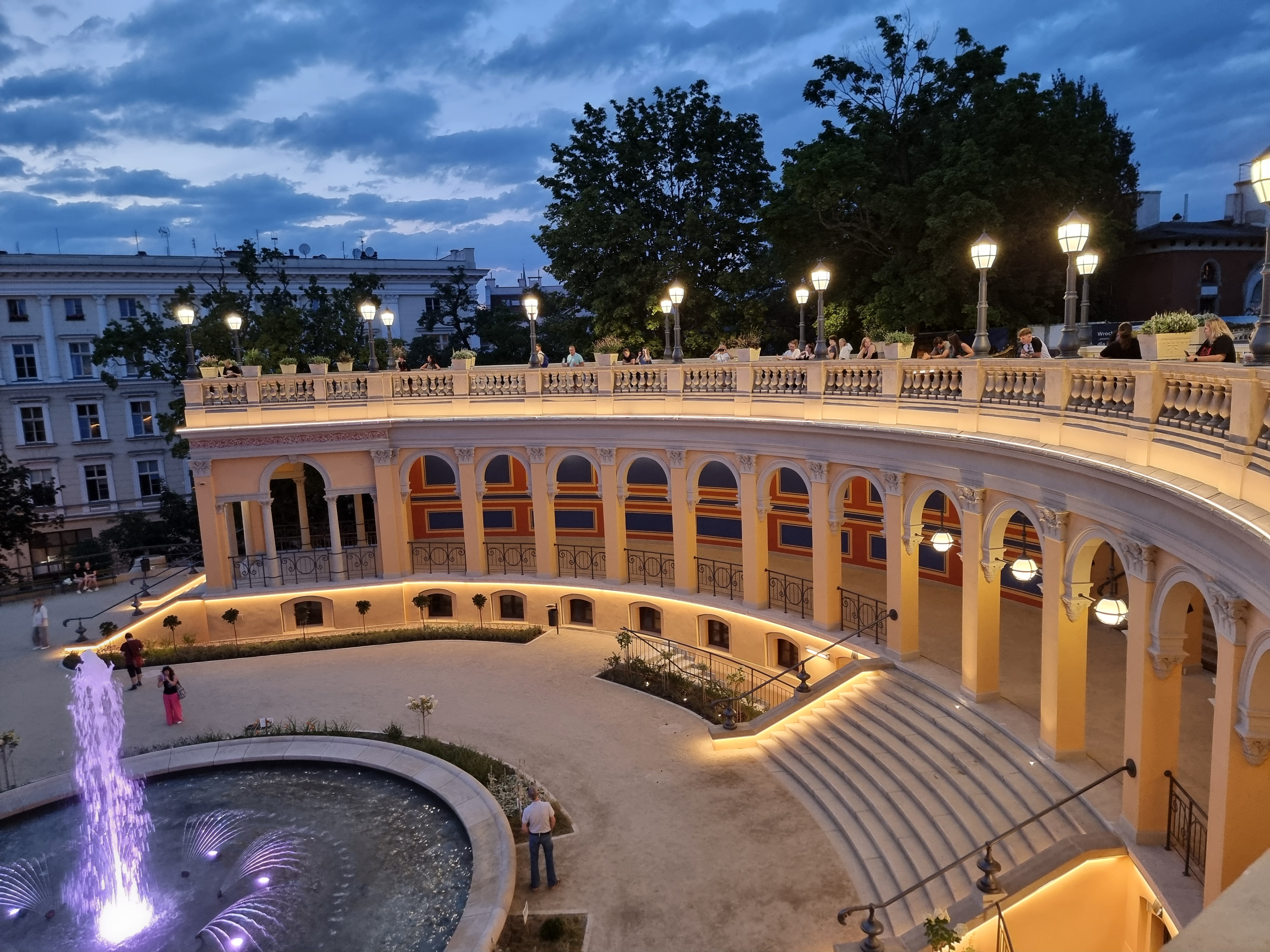
Overview of the colonnade and large fountain, 2024

== See also ==
- History of Wrocław
- Old Town, Wrocław
