= Kortowiada =

Kortowiada is a student holiday (Juwenalia) taking place in the city of Olsztyn in northern Poland. A wide bunch of Polish artists perform at the concerts, for example O.S.T.R., Maryla Rodowicz or Kamil Bednarek.

== Organiser ==
Main organiser of the event is the Student Council of the University of Warmia and Mazury in Olsztyn.

== Description ==
The name of the event is related to the district of Kortowo where all related parties are held. First Juwenalia in Kortowo were celebrated in May, 1958, and were organised by students of the Agricultural and Technical University (Akademia Rolniczo-Techniczna). For many years, the event was arranged as a joint project with students of the Higher School of Pedagogy (Wyższa Szkoła Pedagogiczna) under the name of ‘Żakinada’. As a result of the merger of the above schools into the University of Warmia and Mazury, Kortowiada grew rich with respect to its special party schedule. The annual event attracts more than 10 thousand of students from all over the country and hundreds of bands – Kortowiada is nowadays one of the most important student-related music events in Poland.

== General Kortowiada schedule ==
The whole event lasts for a couple of days. The official opening ceremony is synonymous with returning the key to the city to students by the authorities of Olsztyn.

== Thursday ==
- Parade of the Faculties (opening event)
- Venus show – election of most beautiful female student
- Concert on the Hill (genre: sea shanty/ folk music)

== Friday ==
- Contest for the best themed design for Halls of Residence
- Battle of the Faculties
- Concert on the Hill (genre: pop/rock)

== Saturday ==
- Sport competitions
- Concert on the Hill (main stars)

== Sunday ==
- Comedy performances
- Poetry concerts

== Other events ==
- Computer games championships
- Agility-based tournaments
- Overview of bands and amateur groups

== Anthem ==
The official anthem of Kortowiada is a song of the same title performed by a famous folk band from Olsztyn – Enej.

== Peculiarities ==
An essential part of the event and a sign of belonging are the Kortowiada T-shirts with a design different for each Faculty – they are selected by students each year. Anyone can purchase them at Kortosklep, the event-related shop.
