= Państwowa Wyższa Szkoła Teatralna =

Państwowa Wyższa Szkoła Teatralna may refer to one of three state–funded institutions of higher education in Poland such as the:

- Aleksander Zelwerowicz State Theatre Academy (Państwowa Wyższa Szkoła Teatralna im. Aleksandra Zelwerowicza) located in Warsaw
  - PWST Branch Faculty of Puppetry (Wydział Sztuki Lalkarskiej) located in Białystok
- Ludwik Solski Academy for the Dramatic Arts (Państwowa Wyższa Szkoła Teatralna im. Ludwika Solskiego) located in Kraków
  - PWST Branch Faculty of Acting & Puppetry (Wydziały Aktorski i Lalkarski) located in Wrocław
  - PWST Branch Faculty of Dance Theatre (Wydział Teatru Tańca) located in Bytom
- National Film School in Łódź (Państwowa Wyższa Szkoła Filmowa, Telewizyjna i Teatralna im. Leona Schillera) located in Łódź

== See also ==
- List of universities in Poland
