= Nazi crimes in Warmia =

Crimes committed by Nazi Germany in Warmia

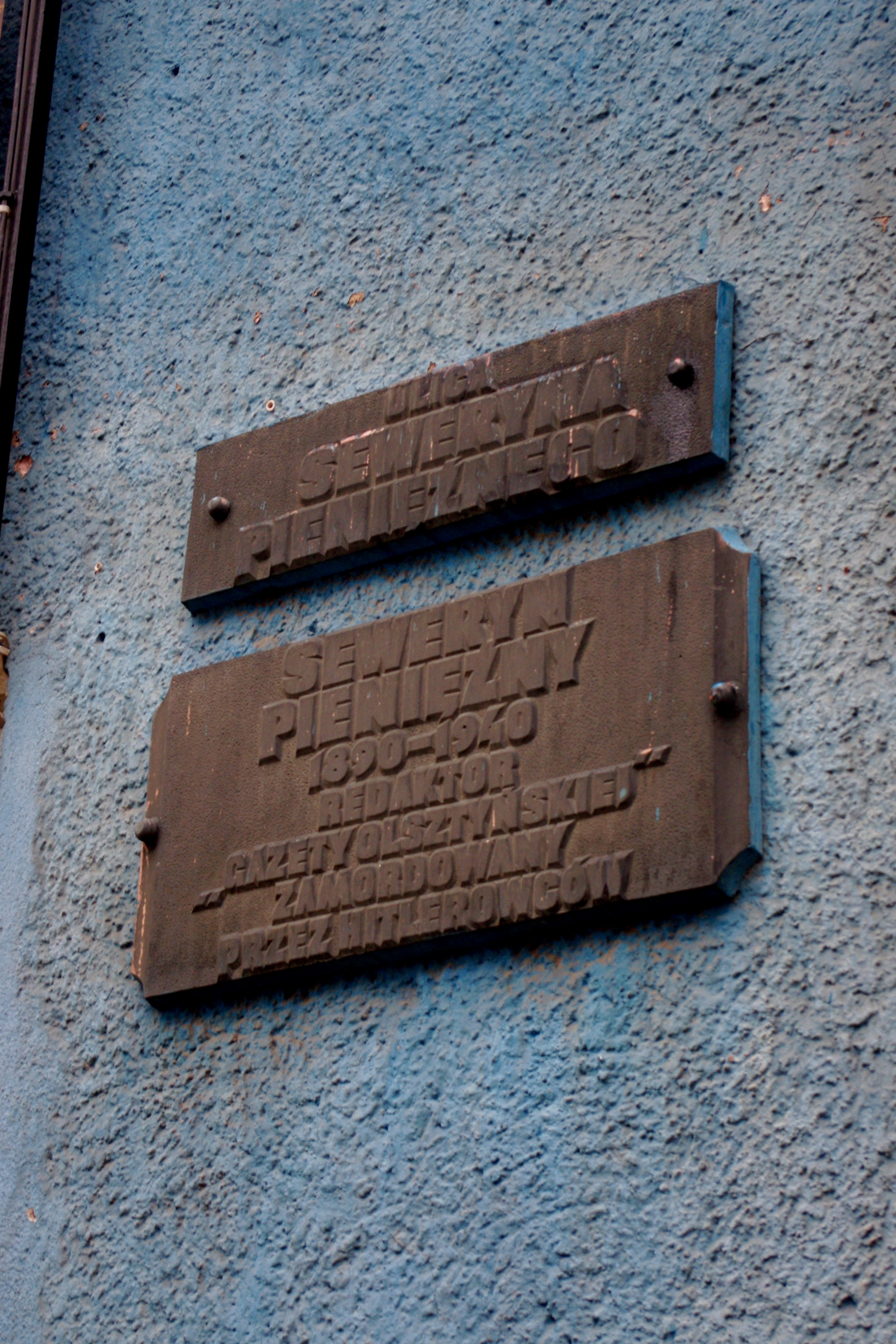
Memorial plaque to Seweryn Pieniężny jr., editor of Gazeta Olsztyńska, murdered by Nazi Germany in 1940

Nazi crimes in Warmia consist of crimes committed by Nazi Germany during the 1930s and World War II against the indigenous Polish population in Warmia.

The activities of Polish organisations in Warmia were observed and reported by police. So-called "Vertrauensmänner", unpaid informants of the German police, supplied information on the most active members, as well as helped in preparing lists of people that would be selected to be executed or sent to Nazi concentration camps.

Having information on who sent children to Polish schools, took part in masses for Poles, bought Polish newspapers, or organisations, the nationalist German militia engaged in attacks on Poles. Polish schools, printing houses, masses, and headquarters were attacked. Homes of local Polish activists were subject to attacks as well. Polish teachers were harassed, as German nationalists gathered at their homes and shouted "Wenn das Polenblut vom Messer spritzt, dann geht’s noch mal so gut" ("When Polish blood spurts from the knife, everything will be better").

Discrimination increased in 1939 as active Poles were ordered to leave their homes. Catholic newspapers were closed as well local cultural centers involved with Poles. At the start of summer, masses in Polish were forbidden by the German authorities. In August 1939, Germany introduced martial law in the region, which allowed for even more blatant persecution of Poles. Before the German invasion of Poland, in the last days of August, the police eradicated all elements of social and political life of the Poles. This was done by interning almost all activists of Polish organisations, teachers, people who worked in Polish banks, community workers, and priests. On 1 September 1939, the day of the invasion of Poland and start of World War II, Polish press was shut down and its entire staff arrested. Later on, even the Polish Consul in Olsztyn was arrested and murdered. Prominent Polish cultural activists were murdered, such as Seweryn Pieniężny, Leon Włodarczak, Juliusz Malewski, and Stefan Różycki. Locals who showed interest in Polish culture were sometimes forced to erase signs, posters, or Polish symbols from places that formerly housed Polish organisations, after which they were murdered.

During the war, many Poles from the region were forcibly conscripted into the Wehrmacht. The Germans operated a notable Nazi prison in Barczewo with several forced labour subcamps in the region. As part of the Aktion T4, Nazi Germany conducted medical experiments on the patients of the psychiatric hospital in Kortowo (present-day district of Olsztyn), in which at least 5,000 people were killed.
