= Juwenalia =

Polish students' holiday

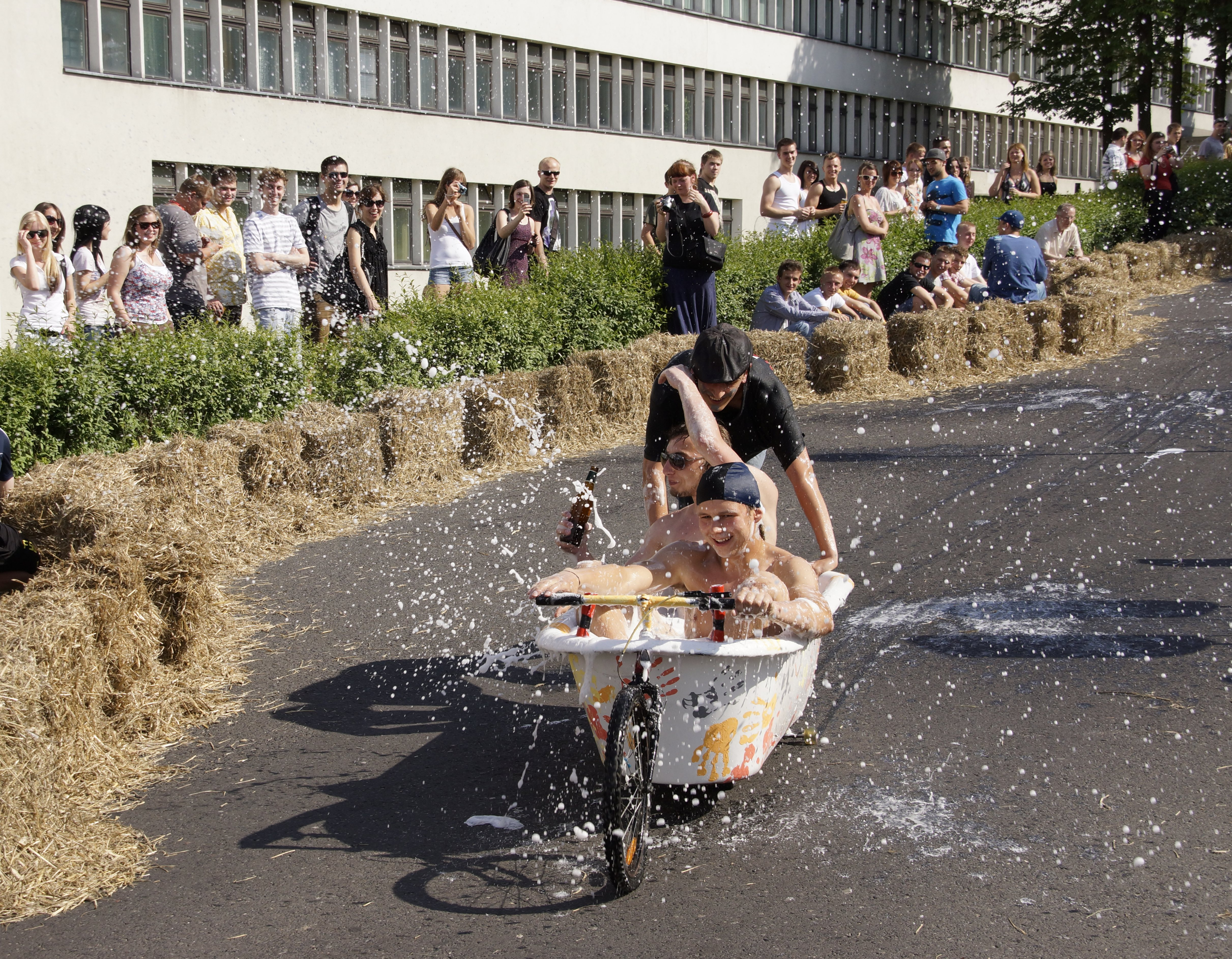
Strange Vehicles contest during the Juwenalia at the University of Zielona Góra

Juwenalia (Polish, from Latin Iuvenalia - Juvenalia) is an annual higher education students' holiday in Poland, usually celebrated in May, before the summer exam session, sometimes also at the beginning of June.

The first Juwenalia were celebrated in the 15th century in Kraków. Juwenalia are celebrated in all colleges in Poland, with different names depending on a school or a city. At Medical Academies, they are called Medykalia, at Academies of Economy - Ekonomalia. At the University of Warmia and Mazury in Olsztyn, they are called "Kortowiada", at the University of Opole they are called Piastonalia, at the Silesian University of Technology in Gliwice - Igry, at the Gdańsk University - Neptunalia, at the University of Zielona Góra - Bachanalia.

Juwenalia start with a triumphant parade of colorfully dressed students. The participants march from a college's campus to the city's main square, where in a symbolic gesture, the mayor of a city hands keys to the city's gates to the students. The three days are free from lectures and filled with concerts, parties, sports events as well as drinking.

== See also ==
- Culture of Kraków
