= Grażyna Cichosz =

Polish dairy technologist

- Citizenship: Polish
- Occupation: Dairy technologist

Grażyna Cichosz is a Polish dairy technologist.

== Biography ==
In 1973, she graduated with a degree in food technology from the University of Agriculture and Technology in Olsztyn. In 1979, she obtained a PhD in technical sciences and in 1996, a habilitation in food technology and nutrition, based on her thesis Proteinazy i peptydazy mezofilnych paciorkowców mlekowych – wpływ na degradację kazeiny i parakazeiny. In 2003, she was awarded the title of professor of agricultural sciences.

She worked at the University of Warmia and Mazury in Olsztyn and the Higher School of Rehabilitation in Warsaw. From 2016 to 2019, she was a member of the Council of the Faculty of Food Science at the University of Warmia and Mazury in Olsztyn. She has supervised four doctoral dissertations. She authored and co-authored dozens of scientific publications.

On 19 October 2025, she gave an interview to Bogdan Rymanowski, in which she said, among others, that soy contains proteins that are not digestible by humans, and that its consumption leads to inflammation. In response to this interview, Bronisław Sitek, the chairman of the Council of Scientific Excellence, published a letter on 3 November 2025 in which he denied the theses put forward in the interview by Grażyna Cichosz and stated that “the current state of knowledge and science does not allow us to agree with the theses presented by Prof. Dr. hab. Grażyna Cichosz”.
