= Provincial Mental Sanatorium Kortau =

Provincial Mental Sanatorium Kortau Provinzial-Heil- und Pflege-Anstalt Kortau
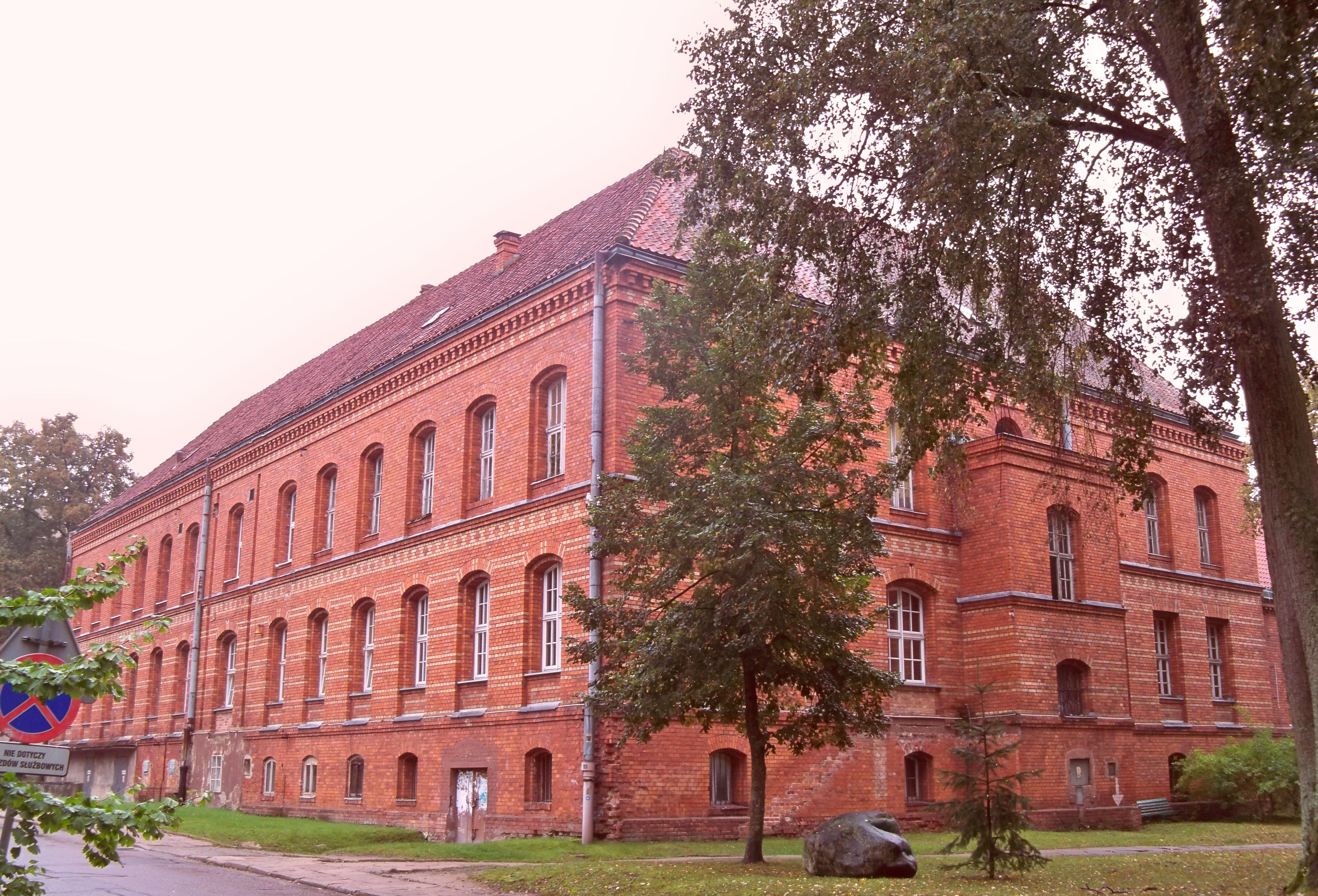
- Modern view

- Location on a map of pre-war Germany Location on a map of modern Poland

Geography
- Location: Kortau, East Prussia (Kortowo, Poland)
- Coordinates: 53°45′37″N 20°27′30″E

Services
- Beds: 600 (1886); 937 (1912); 1,400 (1936); 520 psychiatric, 1,350 military (1942)

History
- Founded: 2 June 1886
- Closed: 22 January 1945

The Provincial Mental Sanatorium Kortau (German: Provinzial-Heil- und Pflege-Anstalt Kortau) was a psychiatric hospital in Kortau, East Prussia (Kortowo, Poland). Founded in 1886, it was located about 2 km south of the town center of Allenstein (Olsztyn), at the Kortsee (Lake Kortowskie). The hospital housed up to 1,400 patients from all over East Prussia. During World War II, many of Kortau's patients were sent to Germany and executed as part of Nazi Germany's euthanasia programme. Most of the remaining patients and staff were killed by the Red Army in January 1945.

== Before World War II ==
Construction, which began in 1883, cost 3.17 million Goldmarks. The hospital opened on 2 June 1886 with 600 beds. It housed mentally ill people from all over East Prussia. Kortau's first medical director, until 1891, was Eugen Hallervorden; he was succeeded by Adolf Stoltenhoff, who headed the hospital until 1917. The hospital compound covered 253 hectares (630 acres), of which 98 ha (240 acres) were used for farming. Among the 56 buildings in the compound was a bakery; there was also a church, used for both Protestant and Catholic liturgies, and a cemetery for deceased patients and staff. Jewish patients were given pastoral care by the Jewish community in Allenstein, and after death, were buried in the Jewish cemetery there. Kortau had its own power and water supply, sewer system, and refuse collection.

Kortau was one of the most modern psychiatric hospitals at the beginning of the 20th century in the German Empire. Following the turn of the century, additions were made to the hospital, including bathrooms for therapeutic use, a lounge for patients with tuberculosis, and a surgical suite with modern X-ray equipment. From 1900 to 1912, 1 million Marks were spent on additions. As of 1912, 417 male and 520 female patients lived in 24 buildings. 75 male nurses cared for the men, and 90 female nurses attended to the women.

In World War I, Kortau also served as a military hospital.

In 1933, the hospital began compulsory sterilization of its patients, as was required by the Nazi Law for the Prevention of Hereditarily Diseased Offspring.

Kortau had a bed capacity of 1,400 in 1936.

== Aktion T4 ==
Between 21 and 31 May 1940, 301 patients were deported from Kortau to Soldau concentration camp (Działdowo) as part of what would become known as Aktion T4. These patients had been identified as having traits, diseases, or conditions deemed in conflict with the Nazi policy of "racial hygiene". They were among a group of 1,558 mentally ill inpatients from East Prussia and occupied Poland who were killed by a Schutzstaffel unit commanded by Herbert Lange, who was paid 10 Reichsmarks for each victim. "Aktion Lange", as the killings would later be called, attracted notice in East Prussia. Officially, the patients had been deported, without a formal declaration of death. Many of them had legal guardians who insisted on being given the official reports of what had happened to their charges. They were assisted in their enquiries by some district judges; these judges would be disciplined by the president of the Oberlandesgericht ('Higher Regional Court') in Königsberg. When official death certificates were produced, guardians and relatives of the patients noted that many of their deaths were ascribed to the ambiguous cause of "contagious disease"; this raised further suspicion.

Beginning in 1941, Kortau served as a transit centre for patients from several other hospitals. According to the Nazis, these patients were sent to Kortau, and other transit centres, for assessment. The transit centres' actual purpose was to thwart attempts by the patients' relatives and physicians to track their whereabouts. The patients were taken from the transit centres directly to Sonderbehandlung ('special treatment') centres, where they were summarily executed by carbon monoxide. In July, at least 474 patients were transported from Kortau to Saxony. 78 of these were taken directly to the Sonnenstein Euthanasia Centre; the rest were sent to mental hospitals that fed Sonnenstein. (Note: quote: "Vermutlich weit mehr als 400 Patienten kamen im Juli 1941 von dort [Kortau] nach Sachsen, wo ein kleinerer Teil von 78 Patienten direkt in der Tötungsanstalt Pirna/Sonnenstein mittels Kohlenmonoxid-Gas ums Leben gebracht wurde. Der größere Teil der Patientengruppe wurde im Zwischenanstaltssystem [...] derselben Tötungsanstalt verteilt, um später entsprechend der Tötungskapazität von Sonnenstein eingeteilt zu werden." "Probably far more than 400 patients came from there [Kortau] to Saxony in July 1941, where a smaller part of 78 patients were killed directly in the Pirna/Sonnenstein killing center using carbon monoxide gas. The greater part of the patient group was distributed in the interim system [...] of the same killing center in order to be later classified according to the killing capacity of Sonnenstein.") 196 more patients were deported in August 1941, and a further 348 were transferred in February 1942. These patients were killed at Sonnenstein, Bernburg, and Hadamar, as well as other locations. Some patients were killed at Kortau, with medication overdoses, in what was termed "wild euthanasia" (wilde Euthanasie). In total, about 4,000 mentally ill patients from East Prussia, 2/3 of the pre-war number, were killed between 1940 and 1942.

=== Deportations from Kortau ===
Date	No. of inmates deported	Destination
21 May 1940	285	Soldau concentration camp
22 May 1940	1	Soldau
31 May 1940	15	Soldau
8 July 1941	78	Sonnenstein Euthanasia Centre
8–9 July 1941	272	Großschweidnitz
8–9 July 1941	112	Zschadraß
8–9 July 1941	≥12	Arnsdorf
15 August 1941	196	Uchtspringe
14 February 1942	350 or 348 (Note: Topp's sources disagree.)	Altscherbitz

From 1941 to 1945, parts of Kortau again were used as a military hospital. 1,350 beds were made available for Wehrmacht soldiers, as well as prisoners of war. The number of psychiatric patients was reduced to 520.

== Killings by Red Army ==
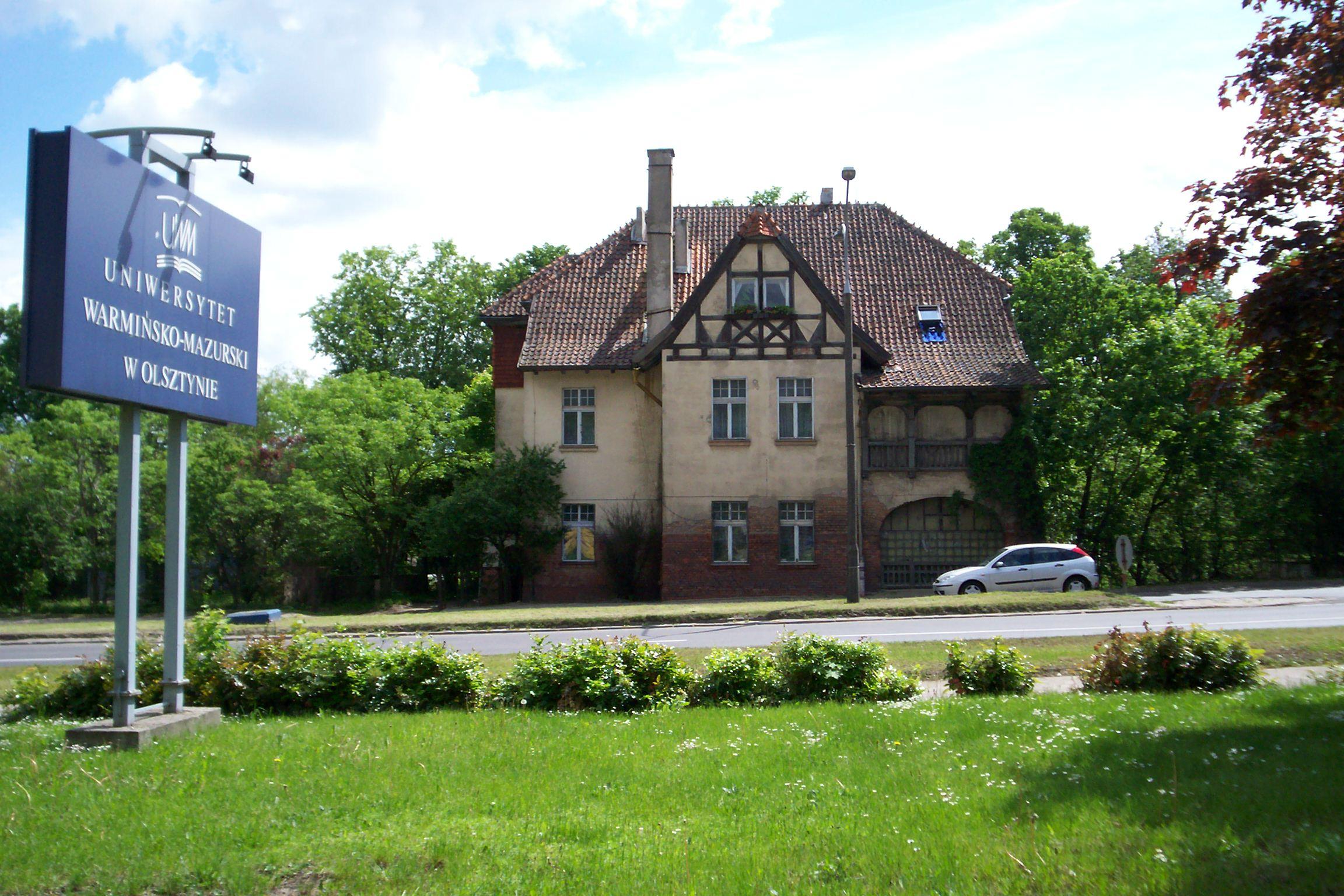
Hospital building at the Aleja Warszawska

500 patients were evacuated from Kortau in advance of the arrival of the Soviet 3rd Guards Cavalry Corps in Allenstein on the night of 21 January 1945. The fate of these patients is unknown. The remaining patients and medical staff, as well as civilian refugees, were killed by the Red Army during its advance through the area. Soviet soldiers set several buildings on fire and prevented the patients within from escaping. Several staff members were found hanged in the attic of one of the buildings (now Aleja Warszawska 107); they probably had committed suicide. The chief physician and his wife were shot in their villa on the hospital grounds.

== Post-war ==
The hospital remained vacant until about 1950, when two agricultural colleges, one in Cieszyn and one in Łódź, were combined and moved to what was now known as Kortowo. In two months in the summer of 1950, almost 1,000 faculty and students from the Cieszyn campus alone moved to the abandoned hospital grounds. They found that out of 45 buildings, only 27 were still standing, and all but 4 of these were in an unusable state. During the subsequent renovation of the grounds, the hospital cemetery was dug up, and by the end of 1953, the remains of 3,625 people had been exhumed. Bodies were also found buried outside of the cemetery, in mass graves. The remains of 227 men, women, and children were exhumed from one location in 1955, and during the last exhumation, in 1963, 109 victims were recovered. It is estimated that 400 people were killed at Kortau in January 1945 and buried on the hospital grounds.

The University of Warmia and Mazury in Olsztyn stands on the grounds of the former hospital today. There is a memorial on the campus to "[a]ll those buried in Kortowo". In Pirna-Sonnenstein, another memorial is dedicated to over 600 victims from East Prussia whose names are known.
