= Nauczycielskie Kolegium Języków Obcych in Sieradz =

Former tacher training college in Sieradz, Poland

Coordinates: 51°34′52″N 18°42′33″E

Nauczycielskie Kolegium Języków Obcych (NKJO) was a state-funded teacher training college in Sieradz, a town in central Poland. Founded in 1990, the college provides a full-time, three-year degree course for English and German language teachers. Initially under the auspices of the University of Łódź, the college is now supervised by the University of Warsaw.

The college stages original dramatic works each year on its 'Drama Day' and produces a magazine, 'The Collegian'.

== History ==
Before the year 1990, the only educational institutions which ran foreign language teacher education courses at university level in Poland were the philological faculties of universities. However, in the face of a significant increase in the demand for teachers of Western European languages, which was caused by the country's political and economic transformation initiated in the year 1989, universities were no longer capable of coping with the challenge. Therefore, the task of educating a new generation of foreign language teachers was delegated to foreign language teacher training colleges. Teacher Training College in Sieradz was established in 1990 as one of six institutions of its kind (the so-called Łódź Cluster) which operated in the Łódź Voivodeship under the academic supervision of the University of Łódź.

The college was the original headquarters was the building located in Tuwima 2 street, and it initially trained teachers of English as a foreign language. Only a year later was the German section created, whose responsibility was to educate future teachers of German. In the year 2009, following the decision of the Łódź Voivodeship authorities – who were in charge of the institution – it was moved to its present location; 3 Maja 7 street, where the college occupies the second and third floors.

The first graduates left the college in 1993, and their numbers systematically grew as the institution developed. In the academic year 1994/95 over 100 TTC Sieradz students obtained formal qualifications to teach at primary and secondary school levels. From 1995 the number of College students increased further as the institution opened evening courses.

Since 1990, the college has hosted many distinguished guests: professors, academic researchers, instructors, textbook writers, representatives of leading publishers and foreign language methodology consultants, who delivered lectures, workshops and conference papers.

Fourteen native speaker teachers from Germany, the United Kingdom and the United States have worked at the college. In the years 1995-2005, the institution entered a partnership programme with the University of St Andrews in Scotland and from 1999 it collaborated with Realschule/Toskana School in Bad Sulza, Germany.

Currently, it's the only college in the Łódź Voivodeship still in operation. Administratively and financially TTC in Sieradz is responsible to the Łódź Region authorities. In the wake of legislation stipulating the liquidation of teacher training colleges across the country, the college has gone into liquidation. The German section was closed down in 2015, and the last students graduated from the English section in 2016. In September 2016 the college ceased to exist.
