= Faculty of Geodesy and Land Management of the University of Warmia and Masuria =

Faculty of Geodesy and Land Management
- Wydział Geodezji i Gospodarki Przestrzennej
- Former names: Faculty of Geodesy, Faculty of Geodesy and Agricultural Equipment
- Type: public
- Established: October 1, 1960
- Dean: dr hab. inż. Krzysztof Świątek, prof. UWM
- Location: 15 Professor Roman Prawochenski Street, 10-720 Olsztyn, Olsztyn, Warmian-Masurian Voivodeship, Poland
- Website: www.geo.kortowo.pl/en/

The Faculty of Geodesy and Land Management is one of the sixteen faculties of University of Warmia and Masuria in Olsztyn, Poland.

== Specialised courses ==
The Faculty prepares students to work in the following fields: digital photogrammetry and Internet photogrammetry, close range photogrammetry, engineering geodesy, satellite geodesy, higher geodesy, geomatics and spatial information systems, land management, numerical cartography, cadastral survey and common appraisal, mathematics and mathematical statistics, spatial and archeological reconstruction, positioning and navigation systems, remote sensing and photointerpretation, theory of deterministic chaos in dynamic analyses, theory of environment and real estate evaluation.

Students of land management are prepared for work in local government real estate management and turnover, spatial planning, property counselling and expertise. Research on application of global satellite navigation systems, improving methods of acquiring, gathering and processing geodetic and satellite data and their use in special information systems, and optimizing methods of space management.

== History ==
The idea of creating a Geodetic Department is owed to the representatives of the Olsztyn geodetic institutions. Their initiative met with the support of the authorities of the University of Agriculture and the recognition and assistance of the regional authorities. This resulted in the creation of the Professional Study of Geodesy of Agricultural Equipment on October 1, 1960. The first recruitment of candidates for geodesy and agricultural engineering was held in 1960. Next, it was decided to acquire the necessary scientific and didactic staff for the Study. Thanks to the help of the Faculty of Geodesy and Cartography of Warsaw University of Technology the first researchers began their work. On December 3, 1967, the Department of Geodesy of Agricultural Equipment (WGUR) was renamed to the Department of Geodesy and Agricultural Equipment. On November 26, 1971, the Faculty obtained the first doctoral degree in scientific sciences and a PhD in agricultural sciences.

With the transformation of the University of Agriculture in Olsztyn in the Agricultural and Technical Academy in Olsztyn, the Space Flight Planetarium was opened on October 1, 1972. On September 11, 1978, the Satellite Observatory in Lamkówko, near Barczewo and the Astronomical Observatory in Olsztyn were opened. On July 1, 1989, the Faculty was granted the title of doctoral degree in geodesy and cartography. On September 1, 1992, the last name of the Faculty was changed to the Department of Geodesy and Spatial Management.

On October 1, 1997, the spatial planning program was launched, and a year later the IT department, which was moved to the newly established Faculty of Mathematics and Computer Science in 2001. On September 1, 1999, after the merger of three higher education institutions into the University of Warmia and Masuria, the Faculty was incorporated into its structure.

On 1 January 2015, the name of the unit was changed to the Department of Geodesy, Spatial Engineering and Construction, and the Faculty took over from the Faculty of Technical Sciences education in the fields of construction.

== Research studies ==
- Geoinformatics
- Geographic Information Systems
- Geodynamics
- Astronomy
- Remote sensing – methods and applications

== Structure ==
The research works are conducted within 8 organizational units of the Faculty of Geodesy and Land Management:

- Institute of Geodesy (IG)
- Chair of Astronomy and Geodynamics (KAiG)
- Chair of Land Surveying and Geomatics (KGS)
- Chair of Real Estate Management and Regional Development (KGNiRR)
- Chair of Cadastre and Spatial Management (KKiZP)
- Chair of Satellite Geodesy and Navigation (KGSiN)
- Chair of Photogrammetry and Remote Sensing (KFiT)
- Chair of Planning and Spatial Engineering (KPiIP)
