= Kortowo =

Neighbourhood of the city of Olsztyn, Poland

- Neighbourhood of Olsztyn
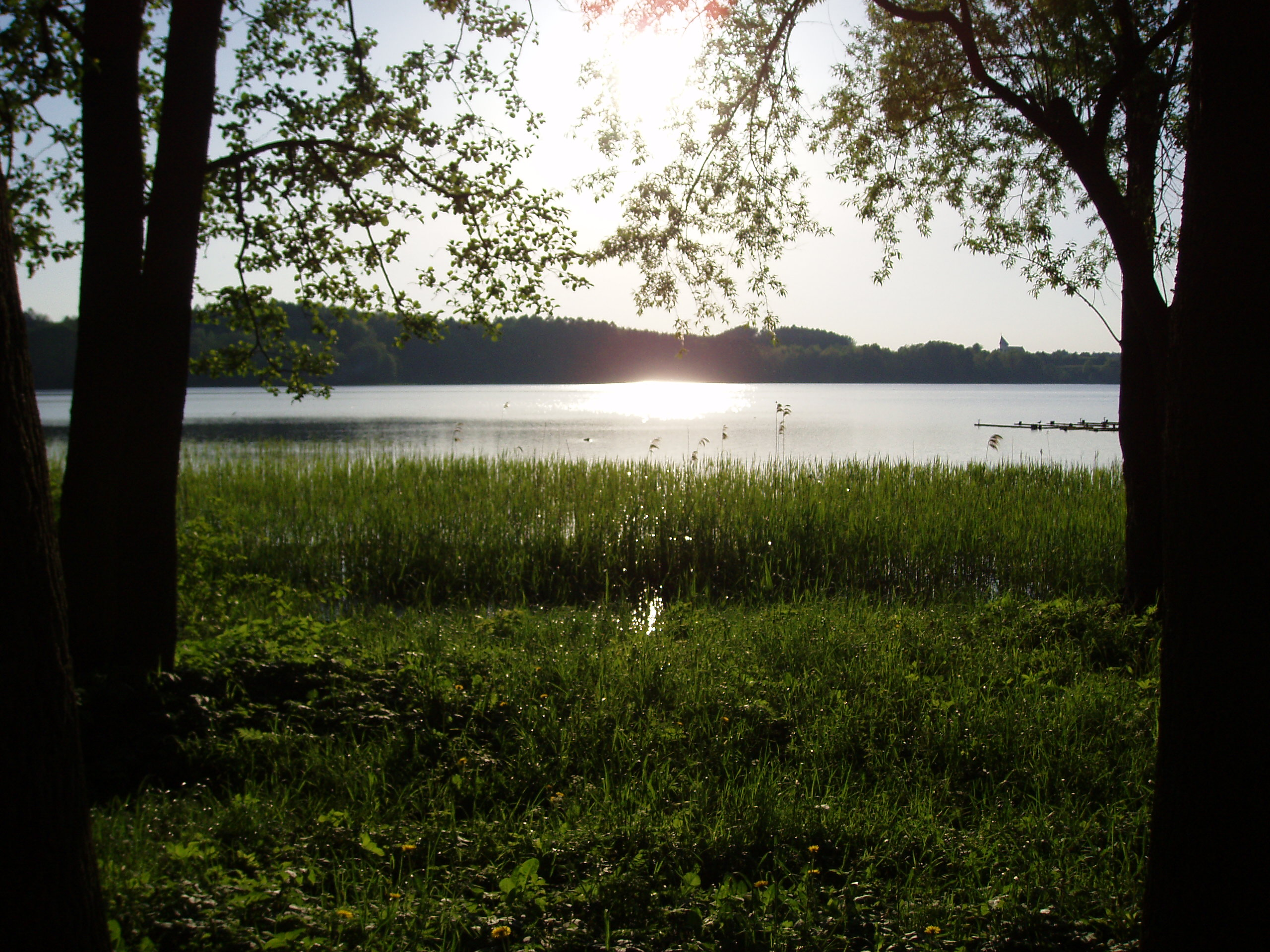
- Kortowskie Lake

- Location of Kortowo within Olsztyn
- Coordinates: 53°45′N 20°27′E
- Country: Poland
- Voivodeship: Warmian-Masurian
- County/City: Olsztyn

Area
  - Total: 4.22 km^{2} (1.63 sq mi)
- Time zone: UTC+1 (CET)
  - Summer (DST): UTC+2 (CEST)
- Vehicle registration: NO

Kortowo ([kɔrˈtɔvɔ]) is a neighbourhood of Olsztyn, Poland, located in the southern part of the town, best known as the location of the campus of the University of Warmia and Mazury in Olsztyn.

Kortowiada, one of the largest higher education students' holidays in Poland, is held annually in and named after Kortowo.

== History ==
In 1886, a Provincial Mental Sanatorium was established in the settlement. During World War II, as part of the Aktion T4, Nazi Germany conducted medical experiments on the patients of the psychiatric hospital, in which at least 5,000 people were killed. On 22 January 1945, the Soviet Red Army committed a massacre of some 600 remaining patients and staff of the psychiatric hospital, who were either burned alive or shot.

After the war, the abandoned psychiatric hospital was repurposed as a college, later becoming the University of Warmia and Mazury.
