= University of Warmia and Masuria =

Public university in Olsztyn, Poland

Coordinates: 53°45′37″N 20°27′40″E

- Uniwersytet Warmińsko-Mazurski
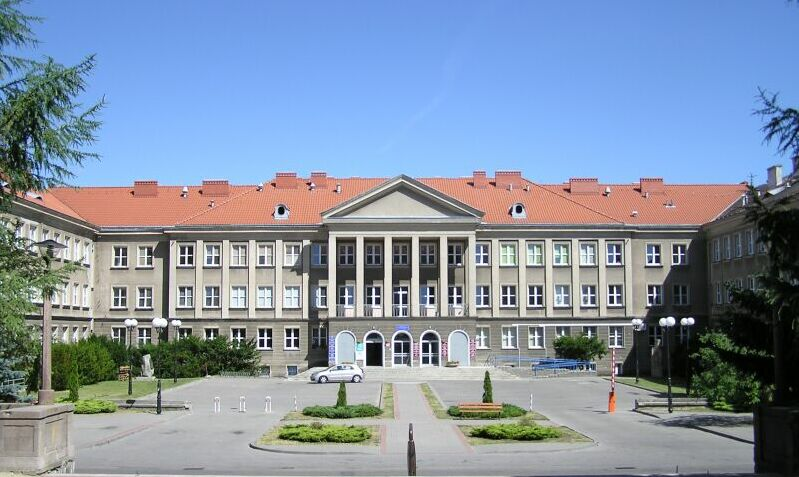
- Latin: Universitas Warmiensis-Masuriensis Olstini
- Former names: Academy of Agriculture and Technology, Pedagogical Institute
- Type: public
- Established: September 1, 1999
- Affiliations: SOCRATES-ERASMUS, CIRCEOS, EUA
- Rector: Jerzy Przyborowski
- Administrative staff: 3,035
- Students: 15,607 (12.2023)
- Postgraduates: 3,000
- Doctoral students: 350
- Location: Olsztyn, Warmian-Masurian Voivodeship, Poland
- Website: www.uwm.edu.pl

University rankings

Regional – Overall
- QS Emerging Europe and Central Asia: 104 (2022)

The University of Warmia and Masuria (Polish: Uniwersytet Warmińsko-Mazurski, UWM) is a public university in Olsztyn, Poland. It was established on 1 September 1999, in accordance with the new Statute of Sejm signed by Polish President Aleksander Kwaśniewski, as well as Minister of Education Mirosław Handke, in August of the same year. Ryszard Górecki became its first chancellor. The Faculty of Theology was established with an agreement between the Polish Episcopate and the government, in the presence of Cardinal Józef Glemp and religious figures. The university's first academic year started in October 1999.

The core structure of the university was based on an agreement between the academic senates of three institutions of higher learning already established in the city: the Academy of Agriculture and Technology, the Pedagogical Institute, and the Warmia Institute of Theology.

The university has 16 faculties, out of which eight hold full academic rights and therefore entitle the university to operate as an autonomous unit.

== Faculties ==
- Collegium Medicum
  - The Faculty of Health Sciences
  - The School of Public Health
- The Faculty of Animal Bioengineering
- The Faculty of Fine Arts
- The Faculty of Biology and Biotechnology
- The Faculty of Economic Sciences
- The Faculty of Environmental Management and Agriculture
- The Faculty of Environmental Sciences
- The Faculty of Food Sciences
- The Faculty of Geoengineering
- The Faculty of Humanities
- The Faculty of Law and Administration
- The Faculty of Mathematics and Computer Sciences
- The Faculty of Social Sciences
- The Faculty of Technical Sciences
- The Faculty of Theology
- The Faculty of Veterinary Medicine

== Autonomous Entities ==
- University Library

The University Library is a unit of University structure which performs teaching and research assignments, as well as provides services to other units. It is a scientific library accessible to everyone. Its book collection is the result of amalgamating the libraries of partner schools, including the seminary library, whose history dates back to the 16th century. The library building situated on the campus is a new "intelligent" building, with an integrated system managing all the systems inside (Building Management System), with air conditioning, monitoring and easy access for the disabled.

- The Centre of Polish Culture and Language For Foreigners

One of the general public units of the University of Warmia and Masuria established on 28 January 2005 by the UWM Senate. The Centre is located in the new centre for the Faculty of Humanities in Kortowo.

- University Publishing House
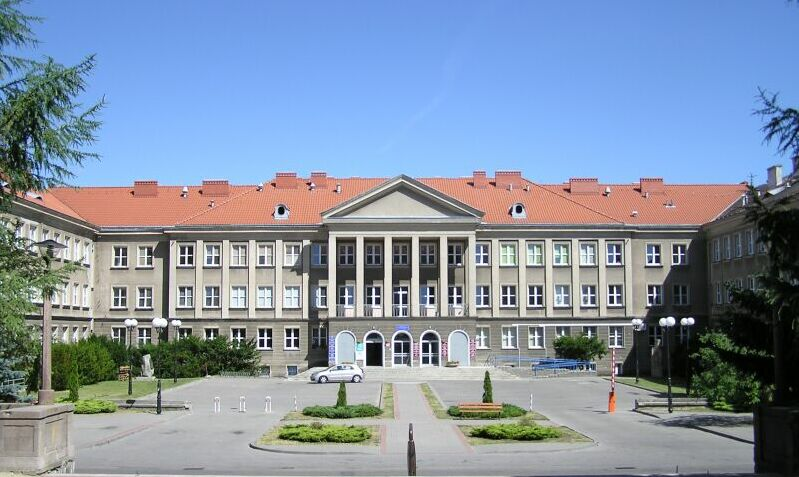
Main entrance

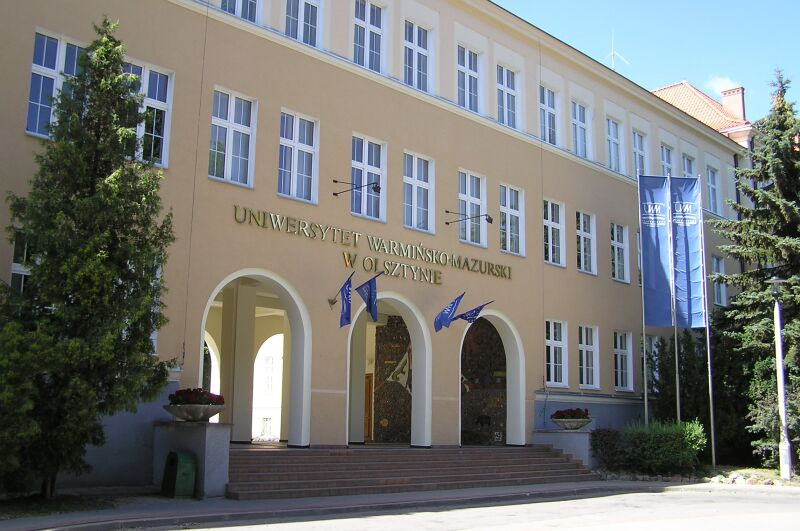
President's office

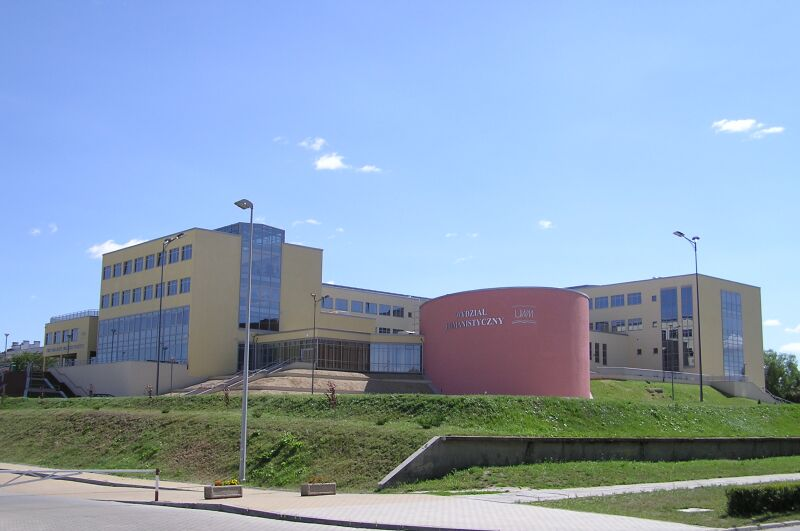
The Faculty of Humanities

== Notable alumni ==
- Robert Biedroń (born 1976), politician
- Grażyna Cichosz, dairy technologist (graduated 1973)
- Marian Jeliński (born 1949), author
- Kazimierz Plocke (born 1958), politician

== See also ==
- Provincial Mental Sanatorium Kortau
