= Zbigniew Rau =

Polish politician and diplomat

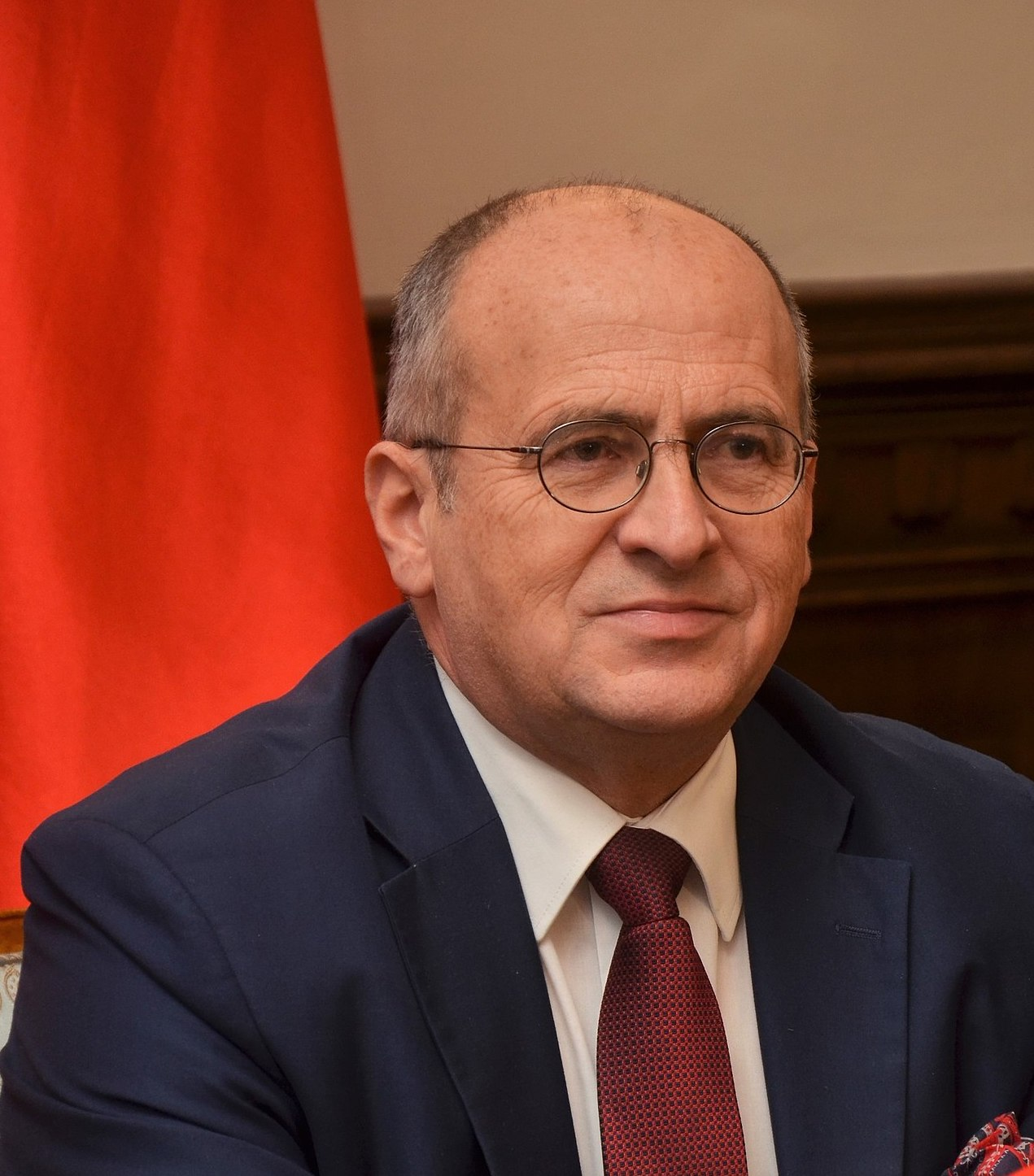
- Rau in 2018

Minister of Foreign Affairs
- In office 26 August 2020 – 27 November 2023
- Prime Minister: Mateusz Morawiecki
- Preceded by: Jacek Czaputowicz
- Succeeded by: Szymon Szynkowski vel Sęk

Chairperson-in-Office of the Organization for Security and Co-operation in Europe
- In office 1 January 2022 – 1 January 2023
- Preceded by: Ann Linde
- Succeeded by: Bujar Osmani

Voivode of Łódź Voivodeship
- In office 8 December 2015 – 11 November 2019
- President: Andrzej Duda
- Prime Minister: Beata Szydło; Mateusz Morawiecki
- Preceded by: Jolanta Chełmińska
- Succeeded by: Tobiasz Bocheński

Personal details
- Born: 3 February 1955 (age 71) Łódź, Poland
- Party: Law and Justice
- Education: University of Łódź (SJD)
- Occupation: Lawyer, politician

Zbigniew Rau (Polish pronunciation: ['zbiɡɲɛf ˈrau]; born 3 February 1955) is a Polish politician and lawyer who served as the Minister of Foreign Affairs of Poland between 2020 and 2023. He previously served as the voivode of Łódź Voivodeship from 2015 to 2019.

== Early life and education ==
Rau was born on 3 February 1955 in Łódź (English: Lodz), in central Poland. In 1977, he graduated from law at the University of Łódź and then briefly worked as a librarian. In 1980, he joined the free trade union "Solidarity".

Rau attained the Doctor of Juridical Science degree from Łódź University. He has occasionally taught at institutions of higher learning in Germany, Britain, Australia and the United States since 1982. Most notably, Rau was employed and worked at the Max Planck Society in Göttingen, Trinity College in Cambridge and at the University of Texas in Austin. In 1995, he became an academic at his native Łódź University. In 1998, Rau was hired as the spokesman and assistant to the rector at the university's faculty in Tomaszów Mazowiecki. In 2007, he was nominated as the first director of the Alexis de Tocqueville Center for Political and Legal Thought.

== Political career ==
Rau supported the candidacy of Lech Kaczyński from the Law and Justice party in the 2005 Polish presidential elections. In the same year, he assumed the role of senator at the Polish Senate, the upper house of the bicameral parliament in Poland. Rau also represents Poland at the Parliamentary Assembly of the Council of Europe, and is a member of the European Conservatives Group and Democratic Alliance since March 2020.

On 8 December 2015, he was nominated as the voivode and governor of Łódź Voivodeship, one of Poland's sixteen administrative provinces. Upon being nominated a member of parliament (Sejm), his term as voivode concluded in November 2019. Simultaneously, he became the lead delegate and head of the Polish Committee on Foreign Affairs. In August 2020, he replaced Jacek Czaputowicz as the Minister of Foreign Affairs.

In September 2020, he met with Saudi Foreign Minister Prince Faisal bin Farhan Al Saud. Rau described Saudi Arabia as Poland's most important partner in the Middle East.

Since January 2022 he has been the Chairman-in-Office of the Organization for Security and Co-operation in Europe, as Foreign Ministry of the country holding the Chairmanship.

In September 2023, the Ministry of Foreign Affairs was implicated in a cash-for-visa corruption scandal, with Rau being claimed by opposition members to have given his consent to the scheme. Rau responded that he thought the claims were "vastly exaggerated".

== Political views ==
Rau holds conservative views; he is an ardent and outspoken supporter of the Law and Justice party. Whilst voivode, he imposed the policy of complete decommunization in the Łódź Province. He is also critical of the LGBT social movements and left-wing politics.

In 2018, Rau called for the immediate removal of Hanna Zdanowska from her position as city mayor of Łódź. Zdanowska, a member of the opposing Civic Platform party, was accused of corruption, but had overwhelming support from the city's residents and was predicted to win in the upcoming elections. Rau's decision, which was viewed by some as highly controversial and dictatorial, did not come into effect.

Political offices
Preceded by Jacek Czaputowicz	Minister of Foreign Affairs; 2020–2023	Succeeded by Szymon Szynkowski vel Sęk
