= Polish-Studies.Interdisciplinary =

Academic institution in Frankfurt (Germany)

Polish-Studies.Interdisciplinary (Pol-Int)
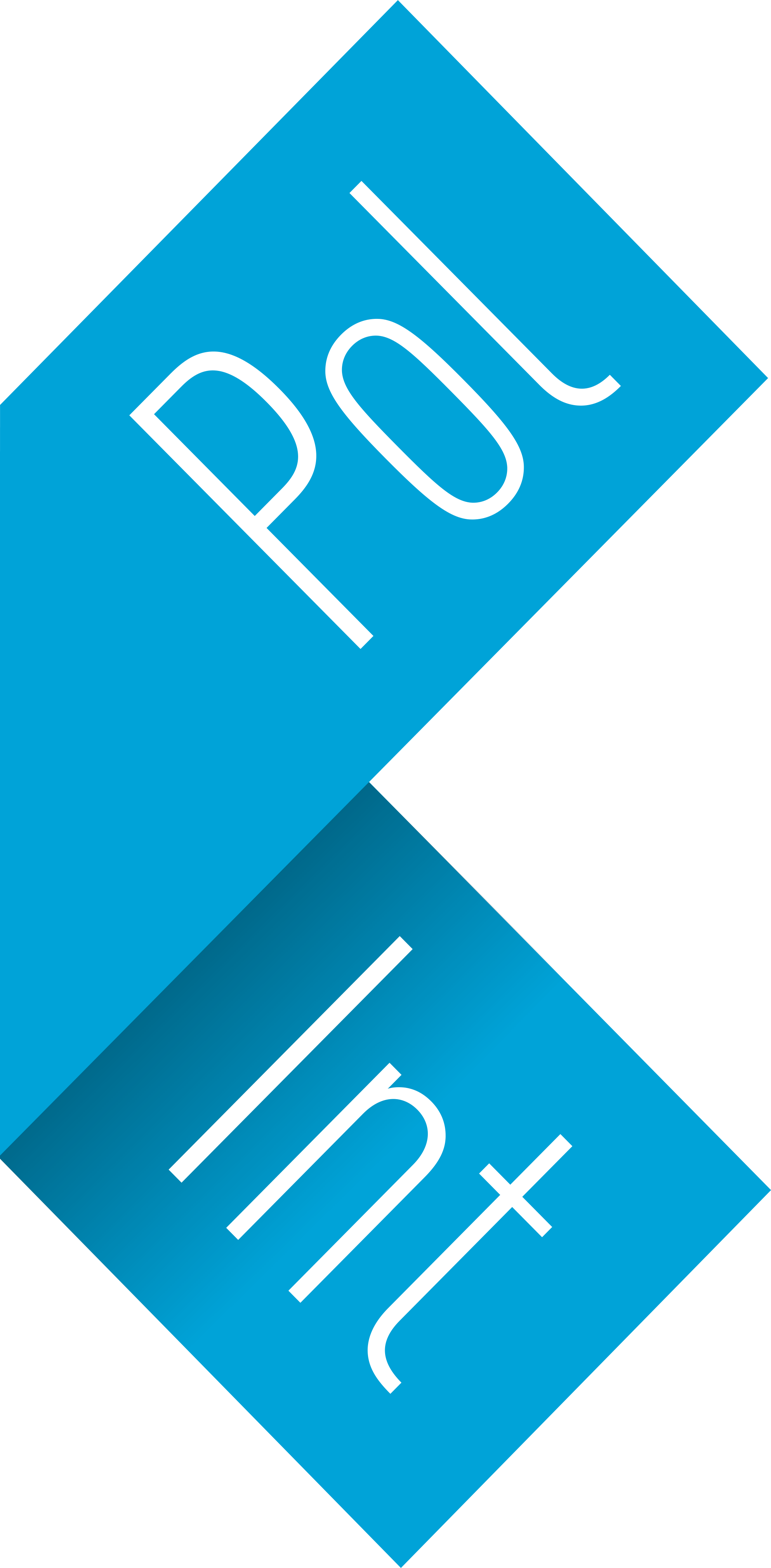
- Established: 2014
- Director: Dagmara Jajeśniak-Quast. The platform is based at the Center for Interdisciplinary Polish Studies at the European University Viadrina in Frankfurt (Oder) in cooperation with Collegium Polonicum in Słubice.
- Location: Frankfurt (Oder), Słubice
- Website: www.pol-int.org

Polish-Studies.Interdisciplinary (Pol-Int) is a free online platform for information on and international exchange in the field of Polish studies. The platform was launched in 2014 and serves as a tool for a growing interdisciplinary community of scholars worldwide to promote their own research and publications in Polish studies. Users can publish reviews, share information about conferences, events, and career opportunities as well as connect and engage in discussions on current issues. Pol-Int is headed by Dagmara Jajeśniak-Quast and based at the Center for Interdisciplinary Polish Studies (ZIP) at the European University Viadrina in Frankfurt (Oder) and at the Collegium Polonicum in Słubice. The platform is co-financed by the Foundation for Polish-German Cooperation, the Polish-German Foundation for Science, the European University Viadrina and the European Regional Development Fund.

== Profile ==
Pol-Int offers up-to-date information on Polish studies worldwide: publications, journals and articles, reviews, job offers (including scholarships and grants), events, conference reports, and calls for papers. Anyone interested in the field of Polish studies can register, set up an individual profile, as well as publish and obtain information, share and promote their own research projects, and find project partners. Thus, Pol-Int serves as a networking tool for scholars dealing with Poland past and present, its culture, society, economy, and so forth.

All posts on the platform are further disseminated through a customizable newsletter. The platform is based on and prospers from the commitment and active participation of its academic community.

In 2016, Pol-Int launched the academic blog “Salon” – a separate space within the platform to discuss current pressing issues in Poland, to debate them at expert meetings, such as panel discussions, and to later publish the results in articles, reviews and interviews online. The “Salon” is meant to bridge the gap between the traditional analogue and the digital sphere of contemporary research, in order to promote exchange between both realms.

== Editorial board ==
The editorial board is based in Frankfurt (Oder). Thanks to an expanding cooperation with more than 100 voluntary specialist editors from over 25 academic disciplines who peer-review texts before publication, Pol-Int publishes reviews in Polish, English and German. The editorial board reviews more than 150 recently published monographs or anthologies and academic articles per year and coordinates the workflow with the specialist editors and reviewers. All publications on Pol-Int are required and certified to maintain the level of renowned academic journals.

== Partners ==
The platform is supported by numerous academic partner institutions from Poland, Germany, the USA, and the UK:

- Aleksander Brückner Center for Polish Studies
- Archiwum Karla Dedeciusa
- Center for Interdisciplinary Polish Studies
- Centre for Historical Research of the Polish Academy of Sciences in Berlin
- Collegium Polonicum
- Cosmopolitan Review
- Deutsches Polen-Institut
- East Central European Center of the Columbia University
- European University Viadrina
- Faculty of International and Political Studies, University of Łódź
- Geisteswissenschaftliches Zentrum Geschichte und Kultur Ostmitteleuropas
- Governmental Research Institute – Silesian Institute in Opole
- Herder-Institut für historische Ostmitteleuropaforschung
- H-Soz-Kult
- Institute for Western Affairs
- Institute of History, University of Warsaw
- Institute of Political Studies of the Polish Academy of Sciences
- Instytut Filologii Polskiej, Uniwersytet Pedagogiczny w Krakowie
- Ośrodek Badań nad Mediami
- Polish Historical Association, Kraków
- Museum of Polish History
- Polish Studies Association
- Polsko-Niemiecki Instytut Badawczy
- Programme on Modern Poland, St. Antony's College, University of Oxford
- Projekt Nauka. Fundacja na rzecz promocji nauki polskiej
- Viadrina Center B/ORDERS IN MOTION
- Willy Brandt Center for German and European Studies
- Wydział Politologii i Studiów Międzynarodowych Uniwersytetu Mikołaja Kopernika w Toruniu
