= Phạm Thị Trân Châu =

Vietnamese biochemist and former politician

Meritorious Educator Professor Phạm Thị Trân Châu
- Born: 29 July 1938 (age 88); Quang Nam province, Annam
- Occupation: Biochemists
- Spouse: Nguyễn Hữu Xý
- Mother: Lê Thị Hành
- Relatives: Lê Đỉnh (maternal grandfather)
- Honours: Kovalevskaia Prize (1988)

Academic background
- Education: University of Hanoi (BSc, 1959); University of Łódź (PhD, 1973); University of Wrocław (DSc, 1985)
- Thesis: Trypsin inhibitor of white bush (cucurbita pepo var. patissonina fruits and seeds) (1985)

Academic work
- Discipline: Biology, biochemistry
- Sub-discipline: Nutritional science, Enzymology
- Institutions: VNU University of Science
- Main interests: Protease, Protease inhibitor, Bromelain

President of Vietnam Association for Intellectual Women’s
- In office 2011–2021
- Preceded by: first incumbent
- Succeeded by: Professor Lê Thị Hợp

Member of the National Assembly of Vietnam
- In office 1997–2002 Serving with Phạm Chuyên [vi]
- Constituency: Hanoi

Vice Chair of the National Assembly Committee on Science, Technology and Environment [vi]
- In office 1997–2002
- Committee chair: Vũ Đình Cự [vi]

Phạm Thị Trân Châu (born July 29, 1938) is a Vietnamese biochemist and former politician.

She was born in Dien Phong Commune, Điện Bàn District, Quảng Nam Province. She was educated at the University of Hanoi and after graduation, became a biology professor at the university. In 1974, she received a PhD from the University of Łódź.

She received the Vietnam Kovalevskaya Award in 1988. She was elected president of the Intellectual Women's Association in 2011. She was given the title of "meritorious teacher". She was also named to the country's 2nd and 3rd class of its Labor Order.

She was a representative in the Tenth National Assembly of Vietnam.

== Early life and education ==
Châu was born in Dien Phong commune, Dien Ban district, Quang Nam Province, Vietnam, on July 29, 1938, in a family with an educational background. Châu’s grandfather, Lê Đỉnh, was known as the Minister of War during Emperor Thieu Tri. In 1884, Lê Đỉnh decided to retire early and return to his hometown to open a school, where he trained the Five Fanqifei – five compatriots who had passed the same university entrance exam in the Nguyen Dynasty. During the period, having a son was preferred over having a daughter, but Châu’s grandfather gave an equal chance to go to school for his son and daughter. His daughter, Lê Thị Hành, who is Châu’s mother, was denied the opportunity to go to school and married a teacher at Đồng Khánh’s Girls’ school and soon gave birth to Chau.

=== Nationwide resistance War ===
In 1946, during the National Resistance War when French colonialists invaded Vietnam, Chau’s father stopped teaching and joined the military. Chau also stopped her education at Dong Khanh Girls' School to move to Điện Bàn city and live with her grandparents on her father's side as a displaced person. But then one night, French colonialists came to knock on the door to search for revolutionary cadres, so Chau’s mother decided to take all her children and move to the free resistance zone of Quảng Ngãi to protect them. The first time they came into a new area, Chau’s family didn’t have anywhere to stay, so the people around there let them borrow a small piece of land in the garden of the village to stay temporarily. Chau’s mother decided to make and sell cakes to have money to take care of and pay for the education of Chau and the three other siblings. Chau was the most promising child among her siblings. She was great at math and science but found writing challenging. After school, Chau will help to support the family by going to buy some fruits that are a few kilometers away from the house to sell or help take care of her siblings. Chau was the only girl chosen as one of the six children in seventh grade to go to eighth grade in high school in the Bình Định district.

=== The 1954 Geneva Accords were signed (July, 1954) ===
Chau moved from the Binh Dinh District high school to study at Huynh Thuc Khang school in the North. In September 1956, Chau became one of the first top students at Hanoi University. In 1959, Chau graduated with a major in Biology and was asked to stay to teach at Hanoi University. In 1965, Chau was sent to do an enzyme and biochemistry internship at Beijing University in China for one year. She learned how to purify trypsin and chymotrypsin from human and animal pancreas. In 1970, Chau was sent to Poland as a doctoral student at the University of Lo’dz. In 1974, Chau presented her paper about “Serine Neutral Proteinase from Bacillus purnilus as Metalloenzyme” as her PhD thesis at the University of Lo’dz. In November 1982, Chau was sent to Wrocław University in Poland to complete her doctoral thesis within three years, thereby obtaining her doctoral degree. On December 12, 1985, Chau presented her doctoral thesis entitled “Purification and characterization of the trypsin inhibitor from Cucurbita pepo var. Patissonina fruits,” which was recognized by the teachers in the Council and earned her the doctoral degree.

== Career ==
Dr. Chau’s main research is the mechanism of proteinases and proteinase inhibitors (PI) at the University of Hanoi's lab to continue developing Vietnam's biochemistry.

=== Burn Treatment ===
In the late 1980s, Dr. Chau discovered another type of bromelain, prozimabo, derived from pineapple shoots, which can be used as a high-sensitivity preparation to clean pus from burn scars. Prozimabo has been used in a trial at the National Burn Hospital in Vietnam, and reported that it helped clean the pus and make the change of gauze easier.

=== Premium nutrition powder ===
During 1988-1990, Dr. Chau invented a premium nutrition powder for babies at a reasonable price by extracting bromelain from pineapple shoots to hydrolyze the protein in beef and beans to help babies digest more easily. This premium nutrition powder became part of the “Prevention Malnutrition Program” when Vietnam was struggling financially.

=== Biochemical pesticide ===
After successfully with the doctoral thesis, Dr. Chau continued research on proteinase and proteinase inhibitor (PPIs) and created the biochemical pesticide Momosertatin (Mos) from the Gac (Momordica cochinchinensis) seed to inhibit the growth of vegetable pests. In 2005, the Mos & MM biochemical pesticide have been used as trial many times on kohlrabi and cabbage field in Me Linh and received positive feedback.

Dr. Chau's work on biopesticide initiated in 1994 by an undergraduate student in her Lab - Mr. Le Tien Dung - who she invited to her Lab as a Sophomore student. This study had earned him several awards by the Vietnam National University, Hanoi, by The Ministry of Education and Training as well as the VIFOTEC for the 1995 nation-wide student research competition.

=== Biochemistry book ===
Starting from the 1990s, Dr. Chau and her colleague Trần Thị Áng wrote the "Biochemistry textbook" that went through 12 editions and printing to use for teaching college students the foundation of biochemistry and prepare them to continue in science and study genetics, microbiology, and more . Dr. Chau also wrote "Biotechnology - Volume 3 - Enzymes and Applications" with her colleague Phan Tuấn Nghĩa to point out the role of enzyme (E) in the living system and how it can contribute to solve social and environmental problems. Dr. Chau devoted a lot of effort and passion to the text "Protease inhibitor proteins" to help people who research on proteases with the information about protein that she had collected through all her research.

== Degree, awards, honors ==
=== Degree ===
Bachelor of Science, Biology from University of Hanoi, 1959

Doctor of Science from University of Wroclaw, Poland, 1985

=== Awards ===
Kovalevskaia Prize, 1988

Meritorious Teacher, 1990

Labor Order in Second rank, 2002

Order of National Unity, 2006

First Chairwoman of the Vietnam Association of Women Intellectuals, 2011

== Publications ==
=== List of publications from 1995 ===
1. Biochemical at Hanoi University. Pham Tran Chau. Biochemical Education T.23, No.2, (1995), 73-76.

2. To study and upgrade the processing of traditional Tam Xa wine by enzymatic techniques. N.T. Vinh, N.T. Luong, Pham Tran Chau. Journal of Biology T.17, No.2, (1995), 95-97.

3. Purification and research of some properties of green worm proteinaz. Pham Tran Chau, T.H. Thai, 1995. (Heliothis Armigera). Scientific Journal of Hanoi National University, Science and Technology T. XI, No.1, (1995), 42-50.

4. Proteolitic and antiproteolitic activity of the green worm (Heliothis armigera) during metamorphosis from pupa to adult. T.H. Thai, Pham Tran Chau, 1995. Journal of Biology T.17, No.3, (1995), 28-33.

5. Study on some properties of proteinazes P-I and P-II isolated from marine shrimp head preparations. N.V. Le, P.T.Ha and Pham Tran Chau. Applied Biotechnology No.4, (1995), 28-34.

6. Study on the acute and chronic anti-inflammatory effects of AT-04 on experimental white rats. N.V. Nguyen, L.Huynh, V.Ha, Pham Tran Chau, P.T.Ha, L.T.Quang. Announcement of Scientific Studies of Universities, Biology - Agriculture - Medicine (1996), 64-68.

7. Comparison of tripsin (TI) inhibitors in 30-day-old melon seeds and dried melon seeds. N.H.M. Quyen, N.Quang Huy, Pham Tran Chau. Journal of Biology T.18, No.4, (1996), 26-33.

8. Comparison of tripsin (TI) inhibitors of physiological ripe gac seeds before (Go) and after heat treatment (Gx). N.T. Mai, Pham Thi Tran Chau, 1996. Journal of Science of VNU T.XII, No.3, (1996), 33-41.

9. Some Biochemical properties of the several soybean lines with different resistance characteristics. L.T. Quang and Pham Tran Chau. Proceedings of the second International soybean processing and ultilization conference. p. 71-77 (8-13 January 1996, Bangkok, Thailand)

10. Comparison of the modification of tripsin (TI) inhibitors during the development of the seeds of Luffa cylindrica Roem, Luffa acutangula Roxb, and Coccina india. N.H.M. Quyen, N. Hong Nga Pham Thi Tran Chau. Journal of VNU Science No. XIII, No.3, (1997), 20-27.

11. Research on proteins, tripsin inhibitors, kimotripxin of 7 soybean strains (Glycine max) during germination. L.T. Quang, N.A. Tuan, Pham Thi Tran Chau, T.D. Long. Journal of Biology T.19, No.3, (1997), 46-53.

12. Lipid composition in Vietnamese gac seed kernels. P.Q. Long, N.N. Tuan, Pham Thi Tran Chau. Journal of Science, Natural Sciences. VNU,

Vol. XVI, No.4, (1998), 1-7.

13. Research on the application of AT-04 probiotics in the treatment of experimental acute pancreatitis. N.V. Nguyen, Pham Thi Tran Chau, Vu Ha, H.V. Luong, 1998. Journal of Practical Medicine, No.350, (1998), 243-250.

14. Study the residue of the Momosertatin preparation on the leaves over time after leaf treatment with the composition. Nguyen Quang Vinh, Pham Thi Tran Chau, Nguyen Tuyet Mai, Phan Thi Ha. Journal of Science and Technology XXXVI, 6B, (1998), 25-29.

15. Characteristics of Proteinases from larvae of Heliothis Armigera and Spodoptera Litura. Pham Thi Tran Chau, P.T.Ha, T.H. Thai. J. Biochem. Mol. Biol. and Biophys. Vol.2, No 3, (1999), 225-231.

16. Learn about the antimicrobial effects of AT-04 on burn patients. Nguyen Dinh Bang, Do Luong Tuan, Pham Thi Tran Chau. Journal of Biology 21(1b), (1999), 168-172.

17. Initial study of proteinaz of bacteria isolated from nematodes in Steinernema carpocapsae TL and Heterorhabdilis sp. TK 3. Trinh Hong Thai, Nguyen Hoai Ha, Phan Thi Ha, Pham Thi Tran Chau. Journal of Biology 21(1b) (1999): 173-179

18. Investigation of Proteinase protein inhibitors (PPIs) from seeds of certain plants belonging to Moraceae family and other ones. Pham Thi Tran Chau, N. H. Anh, L.T. Quang, P.T. Ha, N. T. Mai, D.T. Anh. Journal of Science, Natural sciences t XV, N0-3, (1999), 1-10. (Journal of Science, Natural Sciences, Hanoi National University).

19. Vegetable insecticidal effect of Momosertatin extracted from gac seeds (Momordica cochinchinensis). Pham Thi Tran Chau, Tran Quang Tan, Phan Thi Ha, Hoang Thi Viet, Mai Ngoc Toan, Nguyen Dau Toan, Trinh Hong Thai, Pham Thi Hanh. t.XVI, No.1 (2000) 1-11

20. Experimental anti-inflammatory effect of the preparation AT-04 on white rats. Nguyen Van Nguyen, Vu Ha, Hoang Van Luong, Pham Thi Tran Chau. Journal of Science and Natural Sciences, Hanoi National University, vol.XVI, No.1 (2000), 30-33.

21. Preliminary study of the proteinaz of the chickpea weevil (Caloosobruchus chinensis L). Nguyen Hong Nga, Nguyen Quynh Uyen, Trinh Hong Thai, Pham Thi Tran Chau. Journal of Science and Natural Sciences, Hanoi National University vol.XVI, No.1, (2000) 38-47.

22. The release of protein proteinase inhibitors (PPIs) from seven soybean genera during germination. Le Trong Quang, Pham Tran Chau. Journal of Science and Natural Sciences, Hanoi National University, No.1, 48, 2000.

23. Squash tripsin inhibitors from Momordica cochinchinensis contain an atypical macrocyclic structure. Jean-Francosis HERNANDEZ, Jean GAGNON, Laurent CHICHE, Tuyet Mai Nguyen, Jean-Pierre ANDRIEU, Annie HEITZ, Thai Trinh Hong, T Tran Chau Pham, Dung Le Nguyen. Biochemistry Vol 39, p. 5722-5730, 2000.

24. Effect of Momosertatin on extracellular proteinase of Pseudomonas isolated from burn pus. Phan Thi Ha, Pham Thi Tran Chau. Journal of Biology 22(3): 31-37, 2000.

=== Publications at international and domestic conferences ===
The isolation of bromelain, antilizin and a study of their practical uses. Pham Tran Chau, P.T.Ha, L.T.Trung, N.V.Nguyen, N.X.Van. 3 rd IUBMB Conference-Molecular Recognition. 23-27/1995 Singapore.

Abstracts B9-2-S63

26. Biosynthesis of trypsin inhibitors (TIs) during development of Cucurbitaceae seeds. Pham Tran Chau. 7 th FAOBMB Congress 24-29/9/1995.Sydney, Australia, Abstracts POS-2-143.

Proteolytic activity (PA), Antiproteolytic activity (APA) of lung samples in normal subjects and in patients with bronchial cancer. P.T. Ha, Pham Thi Tran Chau, N.Y.Nhu, N.X.Thieu, D.D. Hon. 7th FAOBMB Congress 24–29 September 1995. Sydney, Australia, Abstracts POS-1-258.

Some biochemical properties in some soybean strains with different resistance characteristics. L.T. Quang and Pham Thi Tran Chau. The 2nd International soybean processing and ultilization Conference "Soybeans Soyfoods, green, clean and Healthy". 8–13 January 1996. Bangkok Thailand. Abstracts PO19

Protein coparison of two soybean strains (V74 and CV) with different resistance charateristics. L.T. Quang, P.T. Huong and Pham Thi Tran Chau, 1996

Proteinase, Protein Proteinase inhibitor (PPI) and burn inflamation. Pham Thi Tran Chau, N.V. Nguyen, L.N, N.D. Bang, P. T. Ha, N.T. Mai, L.T. Quang, N.H.M. Quyen, D.L Tuan. 12th FAOBM (Tokusima, Japan Fuly 29-31, 1997).

Abstracts S-3-19.

Characteristics of Proteinases from larvaes of Heliothis armigera (H.a) and Spodoptera litura (S.L). Tran Chau P.T, Ha.P.T, Trinh.H.T. FAOBMB 25th anniversary Symposisum. December 2–5, 1997, Manila, Philippines. Abstracts PR 31.

Effect of Momosertatin on the growth and mortality of insect pests, Plutella xylostella (PX) and Spodoptera litura (SL). Pham Thi Tran Chau, Mai N. Toan, Tran Q. Tan (1997). 17th International Congress of Biochemistry and Molecular Biology. Annual Meeting of the American Society of Biochemistry and Molecular Biology. August 24–29, 1997; San Francisco, California. Program Number 2130, A 1221

Changing methods in teaching Biochemistry at Hanoi University. Tran Chau P.T. Symposium on Biochemical Education Univ. of the Philippines Diliman Quezon City, Philippines 2 December 1997.

Effect of Momosertatin on the growth of microorganisns. Tran Chau Pham, M.T.Hang, V.T.Hao, N.H.Ha, N. L. Dung. 8 th FAOBMB congress, 22-27. November 1998. Kuala Lumpur, Malaysia Abstracts C26.

Proteinaz inhibitor protein (PPI) of Gac seed (Momordica cochinchinensis). Pham Thi Tran Chau. Report at the National Biology Conference on October 8–9, 2000. "Basic Research Problems in Biology" pp. 197 – 201.

Isolation of the tripxin inhibitor (TI-IV) gene from some plants of the gourd family by PCR technique. Vo Thuong Lan, Pham Thi Tran Chau. Molecular Biology - Biochemistry Conference, Hanoi 25-27/10/2000. Summary of Scientific Reports, pp. 55–56.

Effect of Momosertatin on the extracellular proteinaes of Pseudomonas isolated from burn wound pus. Phan Thi Ha and Pham Thi Tran Chau. 15th FAOBMB Symposium Beijing China, Program and Abstracts PB-37, p. 134, 10/21-24/2000.
