= University of Łódź School of Polish for Foreigners =

Coordinates: 51°46′18″N 19°28′23″E

The School of Polish for Foreigners
- Studium Języka Polskiego dla Cudzoziemców UL
- Established: 1952
- Affiliations: SOCRATES/ERASMUS
- Students: 368 (31.12.2008)
- Address: Matejki 21/23, 90-231, Łódź, Poland
- Website: www.sjpdc.uni.lodz.pl/

The School of Polish for Foreigners (SoPfF/SJPdC) is an educational institution and part of University of Łódź. Its main purpose is to prepare foreign students to study at Polish universities.

The School of Polish for Foreigners was established in 1952 in Łódź. At first it was focused only on enabling people from other countries to study at Polish Universities, but since the early 1990s it is being transformed into both an academic and educational facility.

The SoPfF in Łódź is the oldest institution of this kind in Poland and for over thirty years it was the only such school in the country. It has educated people from over 80 countries in the world. Every year about 300 students graduate from SoPfF. During all the years of the school's activity, its employees have managed to create unique workbooks for foreigners willing to learn Polish language. They have also prepared, with a considerable help of the students themselves, different multilanguage vocabularies – an invaluable help for anyone teaching and learning Polish language. The workbooks produced in the school became a base for syllabi created at other such facilities in the country. The school prepares foreign students to undertake studies at many different fields of interest. Students take technical, medical, and economics courses, among others.
