= University of Łódź Faculty of Management =

Coordinates: 51.7758°N 19.4872°E

Faculty of Management University of Łódź
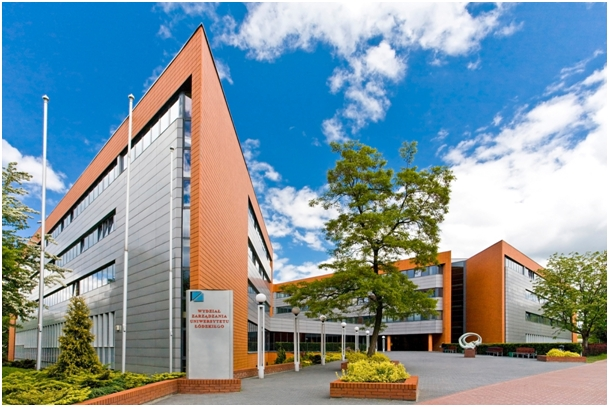
- Established: 1 September 1994
- Dean: Ewa Walińska
- Location: (Poland) , Łódź
- Website: Official website

The Faculty of Management at the University of Łódź was established on 1 September 1994. It was formerly a part of the Faculty of Economics and Sociology but later on six departments which focused on management issues devolved from the Faculty of Economics and Sociology to form the Faculty of Management. The Faculty of Management is rooted in academic activity of the Faculty of Law and Economics and the University of Economics which were included to the structure of the University of Łódź in 1961. The Faculty of Management specializes in academic education as well as conducting research in the field of management in cooperation with international partners and according to best regional and international practice.

== Authorities ==
The dean college of the Faculty of Management consists of:

- Dean Full Prof. Ewa Walińska,
- Vice-Dean in charge of Science and International Relations Full Prof. Maciej Urbaniak,
- Vice-Dean in charge of Study Organisation and Programme Prof. Danuta Stawasz, Ph.D.,
- Vice-Dean in charge of Student Affairs Prof. Ewa Śnieżek, Ph.D.

== Structure ==
The Faculty of Management is divided into nine Departments and one Chair:

- Department of Accounting,
- Department of Business Management,
- Department of City and Regional Management,
- Department of Computer Science,
- Department of Entrepreneurship and Industrial Policy,
- Department of Human Resources Management,
- Department of Management,
- Department of Marketing,
- Department of Quality Management,
- Chair of Logistics.

The Faculty of Management is also home to two other units: the Centre for International Studies in Accounting and the Polish-American Management Centre.

== Students associations ==
There are several students associations placed at the Faculty of Management:

- Students Association of Marketing "MarkeTeam",
- Students Association Personnel Management "Personalni",
- Students Association of Strategic Management "Stratolog",
- Students Association of Information Technology "Wirtualni",
- Students Association of Accounting "SIGMA",
- Students Association "Globalni",
- Students Association "Uni-Logistics".

== International partnerships ==
The Faculty of Management co-operates with international partners:

- Direct Partnership:
  - University of Maryland, USA
  - Towson University, USA
  - Grenoble of Social Sciences in Grenoble, France
  - University of Maribor, Slovenia
  - Örebro University, Sweden
  - Universita degli Studi di Parma, Italy
  - Johannes Kepler University of Linz, Austria
  - Kauno Technologijos Universitetas, Lithuania
- University Contracts:
  - Justus-Liebig Universität Giessen, Germany
  - University of North Texas Denton, USA
  - St. Cloud State University, USA
  - Universite Lyon II, France
  - Lund University, Sweden
  - University of Texas at Austin, USA
  - ESADE in Barcelona, Spain
  - University of Economics in Bratislava, Slovakia
  - São Paulo University, Brazil
  - Universite Lyon II LUMIERE, France

== Courses in English ==
The Faculty of Management offers I cycle (bachelor) and II cycle (master) study programmes in English which are open to both Polish as well as international students. There is a bachelor's in Business Management and a master's in Management. In addition, the Polish-American Management Centre at the Faculty of Management also offers an MBA in partnership with Towson University (College of Business and Economics) and the University of Baltimore (Merrick School of Business).

== The Business Council ==
The year 2003 marked the beginning of the Business Council in the Faculty of Management. The Business Council cooperates with local business leaders in Lodz region. Its main aims are as follows:

- didactic collaboration with the Faculty of Management
- exchange of experience connected with a field of management, both theoretical and practical
- support and membership in students associations
- taking part in realization of student internship programs
- partnership with Faculty of Management graduates
- creating together with the Faculty of Management the consulting and educational offer for the members of Business Council

=== Members of the Business Council ===
- PZU
- PGE Dystrybucja S.A. Oddział Łódź - Teren
- PGE Obrót S.A. Oddział I z siedzibą w Łodzi
- DACHSER Intelligent Logistics
- PKF Accountants&business advisers
- Pelion
- WBK
- PKO Bank Polski
- Gatta
- Infosys
- Marvel Hyundai, Marvel Kia Motors, Marvel Media
- Fundacja Rozwoju Zasobów Ludzkich
- Telma Group
- Polskapresse

=== Authorities of the Business Council ===
- President: Prof. Ewa Walińska, Dean of Faculty of Management
- Vice-president: Ewa Jakubczyk-Cały, PKF Consult
- Vice-president: prof. Tadeusz Markowski
- Councillor: Maciej Kaczmarek, Ferax
- Secretary: Michał Wadzyński

=== Honorary members of the Business Council ===
- Jolanta Chełmińska, Governor of Lodz
- Andrzej Moszura, Philips Lighting Poland S.A.
- Przyguccy Inter Car
- Stowarzyszenie Klub 500

=== Partner of the year ===
From its beginning the Business Council awards its best partner for their support and achievements in relation to the Faculty of Management. The title Partner of the Year is given to the organizations during the Graduate Ball. Here is a list of partner of the year:

- 2010: PGE S.A.
- 2009: Infosys BPO Poland Sp. z o.o.
- 2008: BP POLSKA
- 2007: Bank Zachodni WBK
- 2006: PKO BP SA
- 2005: PZU SA
- 2004: Philips Lighting Pabianice SA

== Quality of teaching ==
- In both 2011 and 2012 the Faculty of Management won in the regional (Łódź Voivodeship) editions of all-Poland contest Studencki Nobel (Academic Nobel) for the best academic students. The laureate was Paweł Rogaliński, a student of management and political science, who won both regional editions of the contest and became one of the best academic students in Poland.

== Events ==
=== The Graduate Ball ===
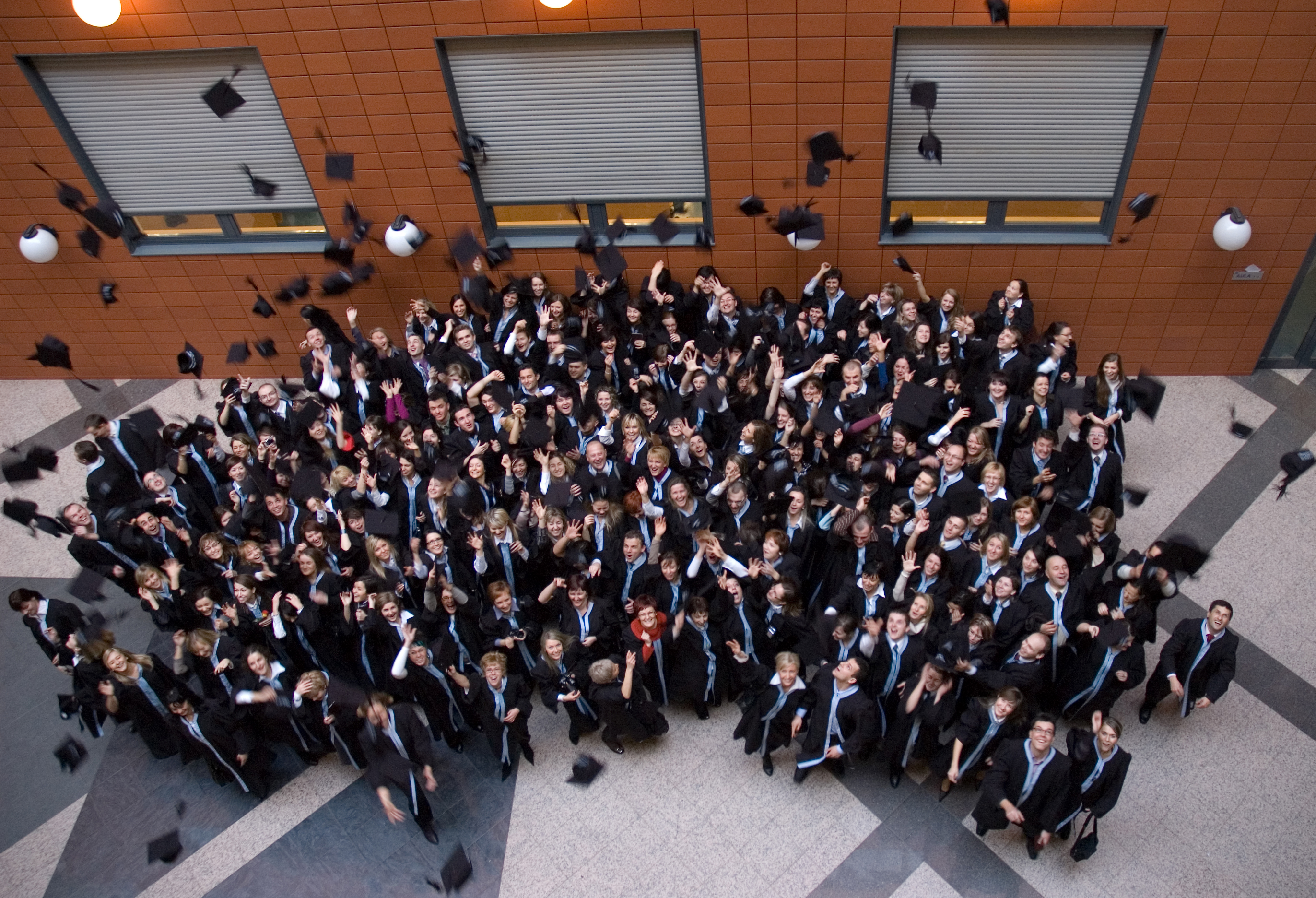
The Graduate Ball

The Graduate Ball is an event that authorities, university employees, and graduates of the Faculty of Management take part of at the end of every academic year. It has been celebrated since 2005. During the ball, certificates and individual awards are given to the graduates, celebrating their academic achievements during the course of studies, or work to benefit the faculty. An important part of the ball is dedicated to awarding favorite teachers chosen by the graduates of the Faculty, with an award called 'WuZetka'. This award commemorates faculty with particularly interesting or effective ways of teaching. The title of 'Partner of the Year' is given to organizations cooperating with the Business Council during the Graduate Ball. The Business Council awards its best partners for their support and achievements connected with the Faculty of Management. The Graduate Ball finishes with the act of taking a commemorative picture of all the graduates of the Faculty of Management.

=== Open - Air Painting ===
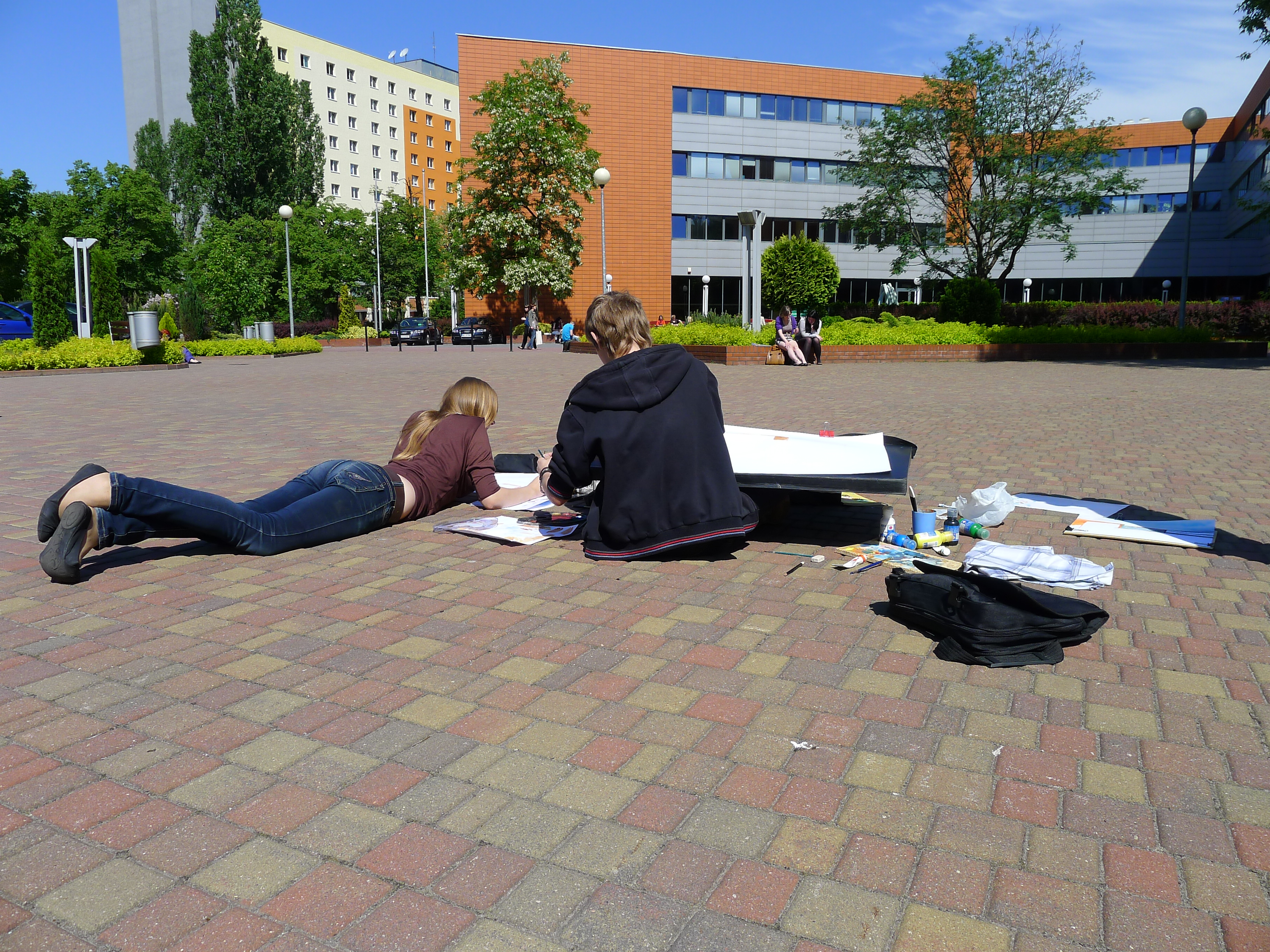
The Open - Air Painting

The event directed to professionals and amateurs interested in painting takes place in the area around the building of the faculty of Management and concentrates on its modern and innovative architectural structure. The works of the members of The Open-air Painting have to be thematically related to the image of the building. The members use different techniques and strategies to create their works. The best paintings are awarded with in-kind prizes. The act of painting takes place outdoors, in 2011 it was organized for the second time.

=== Job Fair ===
The University Job Fair is an initiative of the Career Office of the University of Lodz for many years, enjoying a consistently great interest among employers, students and graduates of Lodz universities. In 2019, the fifteenth edition of the event took place.

=== Career Days ===
The Career Days is a project organized by the international organization called AIESEC. Its main aim is to inform students about the actual offers on the labor market. Students are encouraged to come into direct contact with potential employers of various companies and exchange information with them. The project consists of two parts: job and internship fair and The Academy of Skills. This project allows students to find a job relating to their skills and interests and to compare and evaluate different job offers. The first job fair took place in Warsaw in 1992. The Academy of Skills gives students the opportunity of free professional trainings organized by companies partaking in The Career Days. The aim of this event is to prepare students to the process of finding a suitable job, and to develop their business skills. Career Days in Lodz are organized at the Faculty of Management of University of Lodz. In the last edition of The Career Days around 30 Polish and international companies presented their job offers.
