= Szymon Szynkowski vel Sęk =

Polish politician

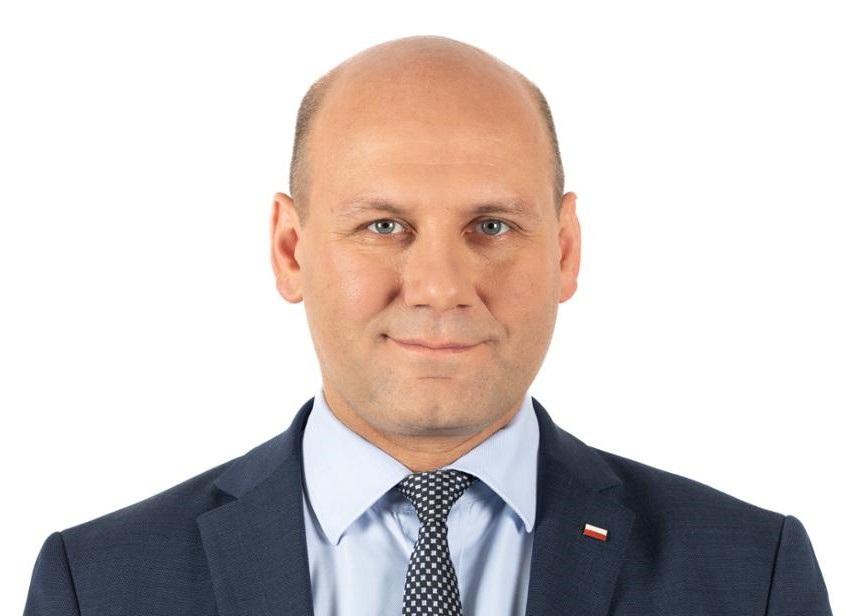

Minister of Foreign Affairs
- In office 27 November 2023 – 13 December 2023
- Prime Minister: Mateusz Morawiecki
- Preceded by: Zbigniew Rau
- Succeeded by: Radosław Sikorski

Minister for European Union Affairs
- In office 13 October 2022 – 27 November 2023
- Prime Minister: Mateusz Morawiecki
- Preceded by: Konrad Szymański
- Succeeded by: Adam Szłapka

Personal details
- Born: 24 November 1982 (age 43) Poznań, Poland
- Party: Law and Justice

Szymon Andrzej Szynkowski vel Sęk (Polish pronunciation: [ˈʂɨmɔn ʂɨnˈkɔfskʲi vɛl sɛŋk]; born 24 November 1982 in Poznań) is a Polish politician, member of Sejm (VIII, IX and X terms), between 2018 and 2022 deputy Foreign Affairs Minister of Poland in charge of Polish Diaspora, European Policy and Public Diplomacy, since 2022 Minister for European Union Affairs. He was appointed Minister of the Foreign Affairs in the cabinet of Prime Minister Mateusz Morawiecki in November 2023.

== Early life and education ==
Szynkowski vel Sęk graduated from the Adam Mickiewicz University in Poznań with a degree in international relations (2006). Between 2003 and 2004, he studied at Osnabrück University.

From 2006 to 2015, Szynkowski vel Sęk served as city councillor in Poznań. He has been the founder and president (2012–2016) of a local think-tank, 'Project Poznań'. Between 2015 and 2016, he was Poznań's delegate to the Board of the Association of Polish Cities.

From 2004 to 2015, Szynkowski vel Sęk was assistant of Jacek Tomczak, Marcin Libicki, Konrad Szymański, Ryszard Czarnecki, members of the European Parliament.

== Political career ==
=== Member of the Polish Parliament, 2015–present ===
In 2015 Szynkowski vel Sęk was elected member of the Polish Sejm receiving 8,676 votes. Consequently, he got re-elected in 2019 (24 233 votes) and 2023 (leading the local Law and Justice list and receiving 45 167 votes). He used to be member of Parliamentary Committee on the European Union and Foreign Affairs Committeel and serve as chairman the Polish-German Parliamentary Group.

=== Career in government, 2018–2023 ===
On 1 June 2018, Szynkowski vel Sęk was appointed Secretary of State for the Polish Community Abroad, European Policy and Public Diplomacy at the Ministry of Foreign Affairs.

On 13 October 2022, President Andrzej Duda appointed him as Minister for European Union Affairs. On 27 November 2023, he took up the position of Minister of Foreign Affairs in the third government of Mateusz Morawiecki.

=== Interactions with international partners ===
In July 2020, Szynkowski vel Sęk – on behalf of the Polish government – summoned the German chargé d'affaires "in connection with a sequence of articles in German media using manipulation and creating a clear impression of favouring one of the candidates" around the presidential election, referring to a perceived bias in favour of Rafał Trzaskowski over Andrzej Duda. In October 2021, he summoned Belgium's ambassador to express "disapproval and indignation" after Belgian Prime Minister Alexander De Croo accused Poland of "playing with fire" in a worsening dispute with the European Commission over the rule of law.

After adopting on 25 October 2023 by the European Parliament the European Parliament Committee on Constitutional Affairs report on the on proposals for the amendment of the EU Treaties (approved with 305 votes in favour, 276 against, and 29 abstentions) Szynkowski vel Sęk made efforts to build a coalition of EU member states against treaty changes in such form, visiting a number of European capitals, including i.a. Copenhagen, Prague, Bratislava, Vilnius, Riga and Budapest.

Political offices
Preceded by Zbigniew Rau	Minister of Foreign Affairs; 2023	Succeeded by Radosław Sikorski
