= Alexis de Tocqueville Center for Political and Legal Thought =

Polish research unit

Coordinates: 51.7710°N 19.4733°E

Alexis de Tocqueville Center for Political and Legal Thought, founded in 2007, is a research thematic unit within the Faculty of Law and Administration, at the University of Łódź, Poland.

The Chairman of the Center is renowned Locke scholar, Zbigniew Rau. Members of the Center's Board are leading personalities of Polish politics and science.

The Center recalls the intellectual and conceptual heritage of Alexis de Tocqueville, the author of Democracy in America. This heritage includes the traditions which dominate in contemporary political discourse; it combines conservatism and liberalism with the Christian vision of Western identity and the republican ethos of civic participation. It derives its political, institutional, and legal conceptions from the analyses of particular social relations and avoids constructing any abstract, a priori models of public life. It perceives the fundamental values of our time, such as liberty, equality, democracy, the rule of law, efficient public policy, civil society, and self-government as remaining far from any harmony and coherence. In fact, this heritage leaves much room for axiological skepticism, inspires a movement of ideas, and requires cognitive objectivism.

In its activities, the Center considers this heritage crucial for any civic commitment as well as research endeavor.
