= Alicja Derkowska =

Polish mathematician and democracy activist

Alicja Maria Derkowska
- Born: 1940 (age 85–86); Sosnowiec, Poland
- Education: University of Lodz
- Occupations: Mathematics professor, democracy activist

Alicja Maria Derkowska (born 1940) is a Polish social activist, mathematician and educator.

== Biography ==
Alicja was born in Sosnowiec and received her doctoral degree in theoretical mathematics from the University of Lodz. She remained there to teach and conduct research until 1975 when, for health reasons, she and her husband moved to Nowy Sącz, a small rural city where both could be instructors at the teacher's Training College.

In her new hometown, Alicja co-founded the regional branch of the Polish Mathematical Society, which she headed for the maximum term of six years. It was the first time a scientific society was established in a town without a university. She became involved in the activities of the first "Solidarity" movement. After martial law was imposed, she and her husband lost their jobs, and until the end of the 1980s they ran a private store. At the same time, she cooperated with the clandestine activities of the political opposition. Alicja was also an important member of Solidarity when it was still underground as a member of the Solidarity Education Board, which planned reforms to the Polish educational system. After Poland's return to democracy in 1989, Alicja did not want to teach for the state again, and began in earnest to establish a truly independent, non-state, non-religious, private school in Nowy Sacz.

According to Ashoka, Alicja's educational plan incorporated the teaching of the "habit of democracy" to young students in Poland.

She "designed and implemented an innovative school model in which students are trained in democratic procedures, both theoretically and in practice... Her plan to popularize her ideas rests on two strategies: first, she runs a teacher training program through which teachers from all over the region are trained to organize lessons and school life around principles, values, and activities that promote civic awareness and democratic behavior. Second, she has organized a multi-national exchange program for students and teachers that allows both to gain exposure to other cultural and linguistic environments and build inter-cultural friendships and ties."

In 1988, she was among the founders of the Malopolska Educational Society (MTO), which she headed for several years and became a board member. MTO focused on promoting innovative teaching methods and democratizing school management. The organization was awarded, among other prizes, in the 2005 "Pro Publico Bono" Competition for the Best Civic Initiative. It was also involved in the creation of a network of schools in the Balkans.

In the 1990s Alicja Derkowska was active in the Citizens' Movement for Democratic Action, the Democratic Union and the Freedom Union. She was part of the governing body of the World Movement for Democracy, and became a fellow of Ashoka.

== Honors ==
Derkowska has received numerous awards for her work in educational reform.

- In 2004, she was awarded the POLCUL Foundation award by the Jerzy Boniecki Foundation in Australia.
- In 2004, she received the “For the Future of the Children of Europe” prize from the Future of Europe Association in Hungary.
- In 2010, she received the Polish National Education Commission Medal for outstanding contributions to education and upbringing given by the Ministry of Education.
- In 2011, President Bronisław Komorowski awarded her the Officer's Cross of the Order of Polonia Restituta.
