= Jacek Czaputowicz =

Polish politician and university teacher

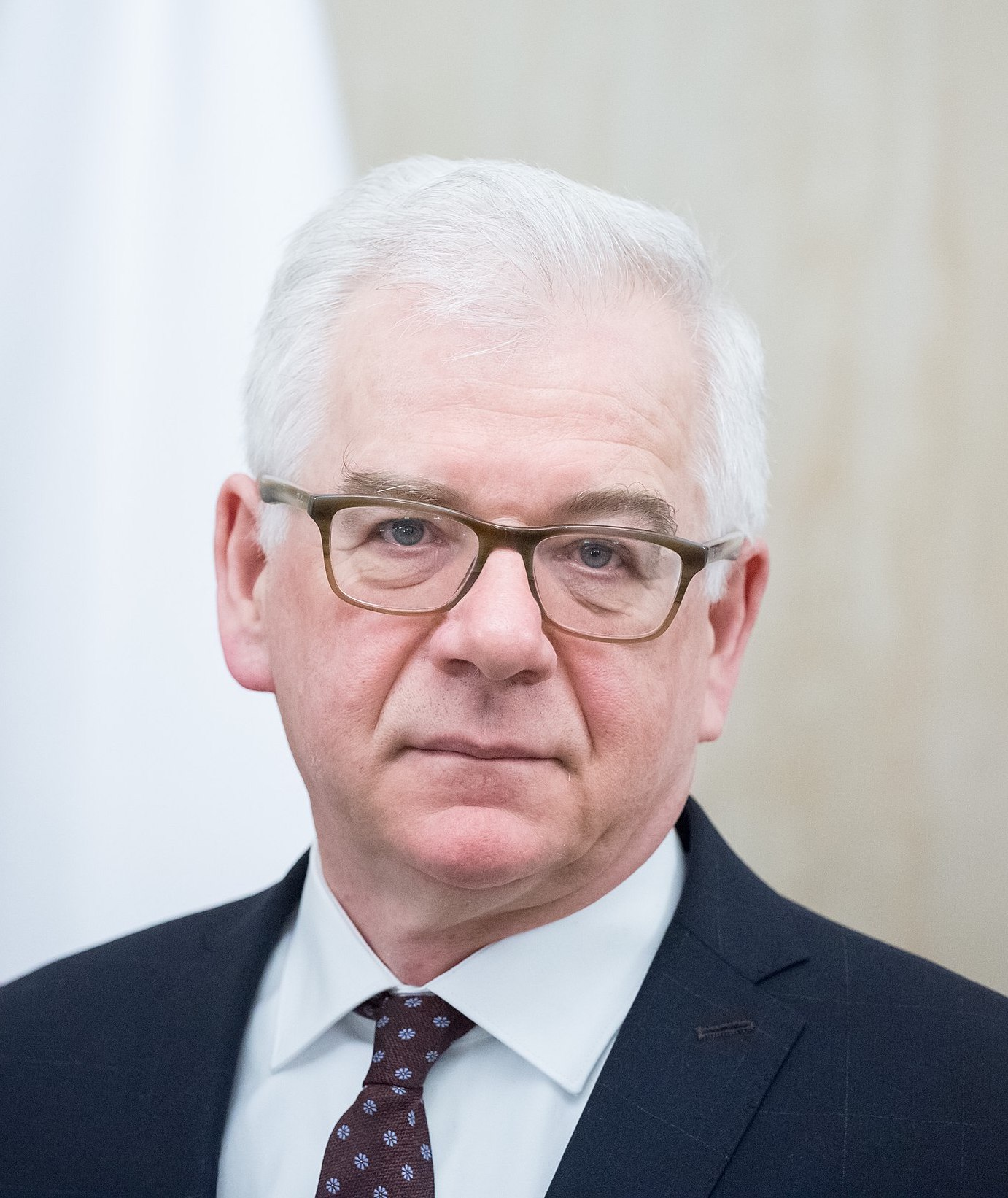

Minister of Foreign Affairs
- In office 9 January 2018 – 26 August 2020
- President: Andrzej Duda
- Prime Minister: Mateusz Morawiecki
- Preceded by: Witold Waszczykowski
- Succeeded by: Zbigniew Rau

Undersecretary of State in the Ministry of Foreign Affairs
- In office 15 September 2017 – 9 January 2018
- Minister: Witold Waszczykowski

Director of the National School of Public Administration
- In office 24 April 2008 – 15 October 2012
- Prime Minister: Donald Tusk
- Preceded by: Józefina Hrynkiewicz
- Succeeded by: Jan Pastwa

Personal details
- Born: Jacek Krzysztof Czaputowicz; 30 May 1956 (age 70) Warsaw, Polish People's Republic
- Party: Law and Justice
- Spouse: Magdalena Czaputowicz (m. 1986; died 2017)
- Education: Warsaw School of Economics
- Awards: Ribbon

Jacek Krzysztof Czaputowicz (born 30 May 1956 in Warsaw, Poland) is a Polish politician and academic who served as Minister of Foreign Affairs of Poland from 9 January 2018 to 20 August 2020.

== Education ==
In the years 1980-1983 Czaputowicz studied geography at the University of Warsaw, in 1986 he graduated from the Faculty of Economics of the Warsaw Central of Planning and Statistics. In the years 1992–1993 he was a member of the Foreign Service Programme at the University of Oxford. In 1997, he received a doctorate in political science at the Institute of Political Studies of the Polish Academy of Sciences. He obtained his habilitation at the University of Warsaw in 2008. In 2016 he was appointed by the Polish President as a professor of social sciences. He is an academic lecturer at the Faculty of Political Science and International Studies at the University of Warsaw.

== Anti-communist activities ==
In 1978 Czaputowicz collaborated with the Workers' Defence Committee (KOR) and the Students' Solidarity Committee in Warsaw. in the years 1978-1980 he ran a library of underground publications. He was arrested several times for independent activity. In September 1980, he was one of the founders of the Independent Students' Association (NZS). He was imprisoned on 13 December 1981 and released in November 1982; then he became involved in the activity of the underground NZS. In April 1985 he became one of the founders of the Freedom and Peace Movement (WiP). For his activity at the WiP, he was imprisoned in February 1986. He was released in September 1986 under amnesty. He coordinated the WiP's foreign relations and maintained contacts with the democratic opposition in the GDR, Czechoslovakia and Hungary and was one of the initiators and signatories of the Helsinki Memorandum.

In December 1988, he became a member of the Solidarity Citizens' Committee. He advocated the withdrawal of the Soviet army and the introduction of democracy in Poland and the unification of Eastern and Western Europe.

== Professional career ==
He joined the Ministry of Foreign Affairs in 1990. He was deputy director, then director of the Consular and Emigration Department (1990–1992). In the years 1993–1998 he was a senior adviser to the Minister in the Department of Studies and Planning. In 1998 he became the deputy director of the Accession Negotiations Department at the Office of the Committee for European Integration. In the same year he became the deputy head of the Civil Service and served until 2006. He was the director of the Foreign Policy Strategy and Planning Department of the Ministry of Foreign Affairs until 2008.

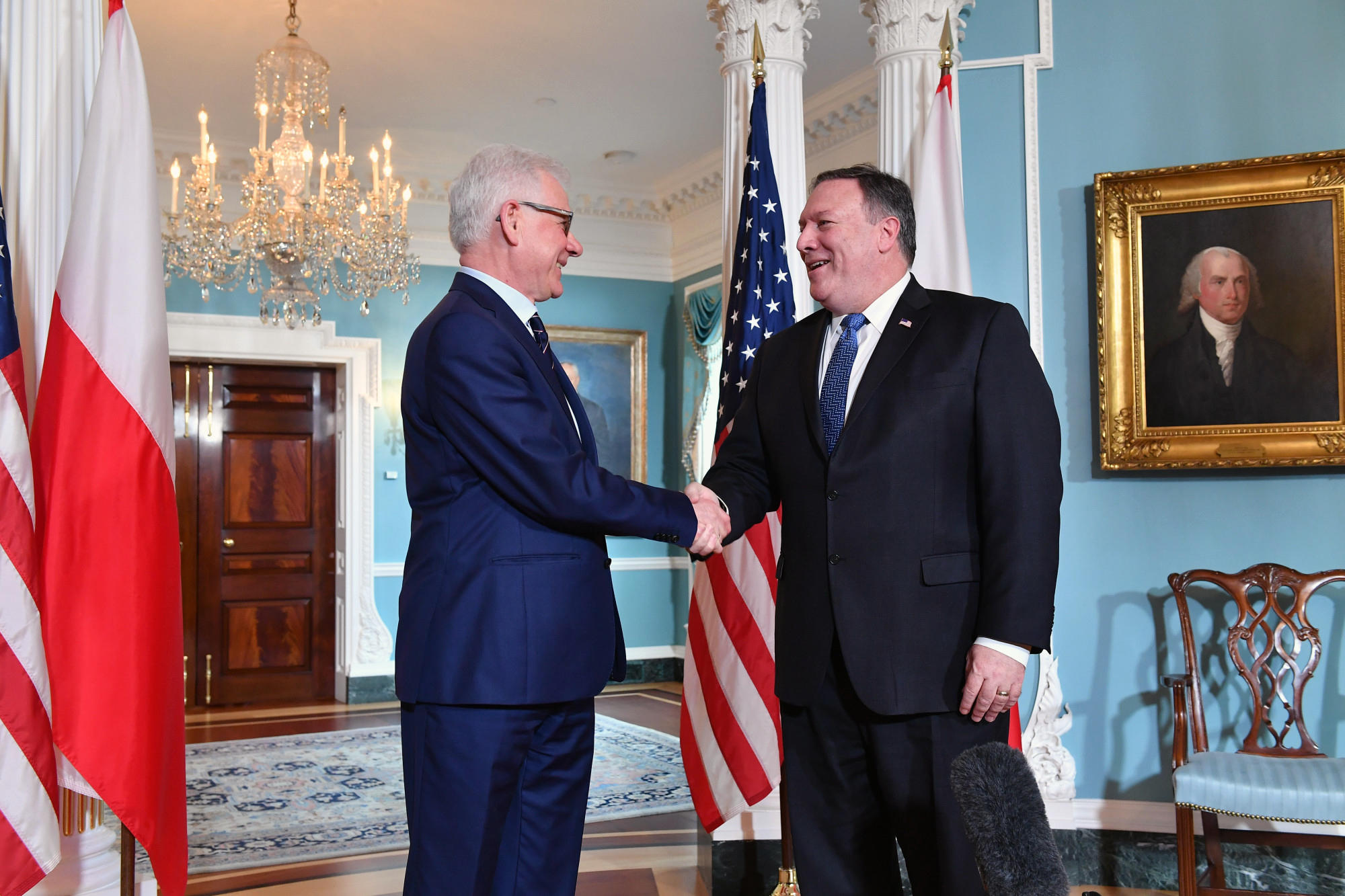
Czaputowicz shaking hands with Mike Pompeo in Washington, D.C., 2018

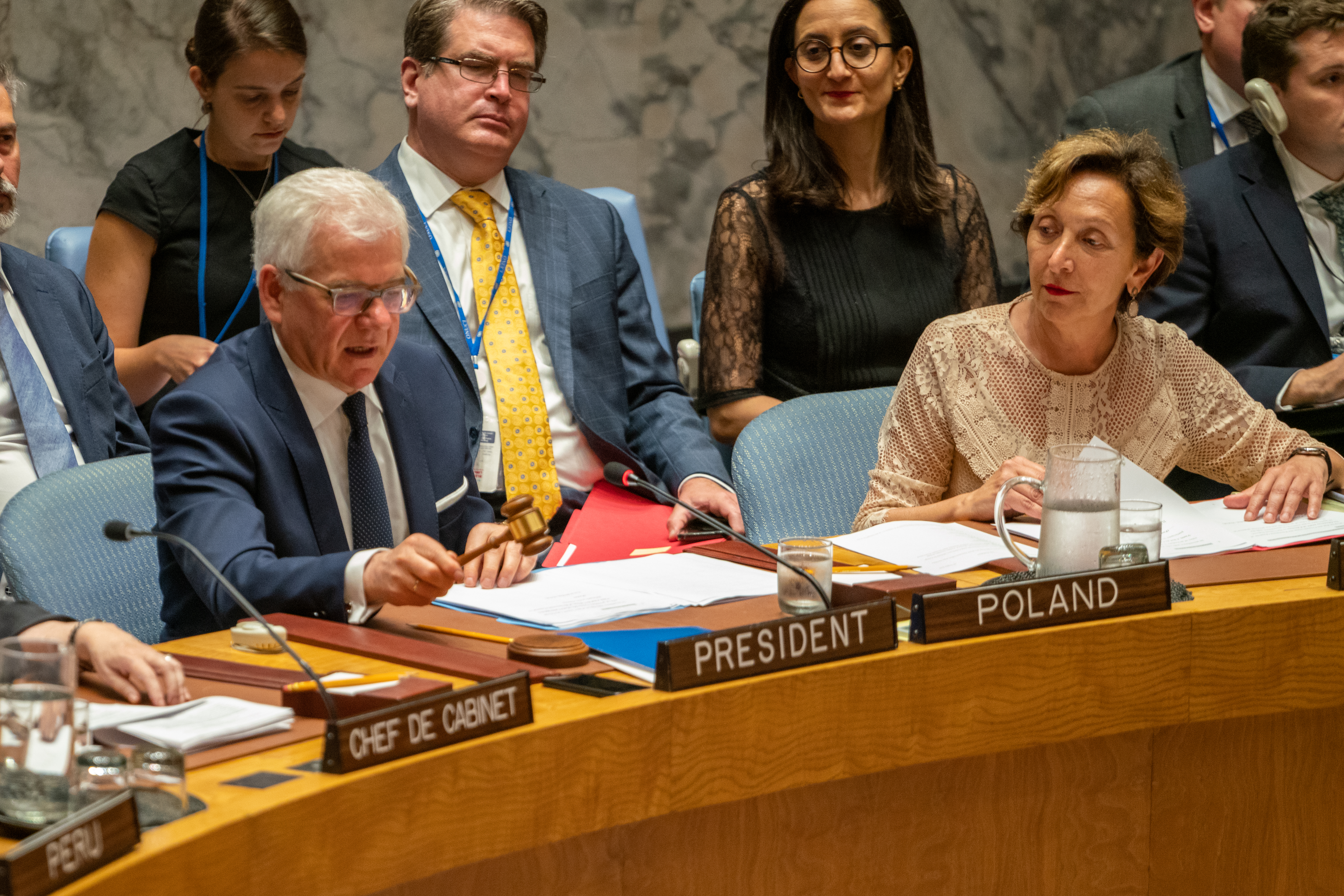
Czaputowicz chairs a United Nations Security Council meeting in 2019

He was the deputy chairman of the Public Service Council (2007–2009), the Administrative Board of the European Institute of Public Administration in Maastricht (2006–2010) and the Public Service Council of the Prime Minister (2007–2009). In the years 2008–2012 he was the director of the National School of Public Administration. In 2014 he became a member of the program council of the Law and Justice party. From January 2017, he was the director of the Diplomatic Academy of the Ministry of Foreign Affairs. He also joined the board of the Polish Institute of International Affairs. On 15 September 2017, Prime Minister Beata Szydło appointed him as the Undersecretary of State in the Ministry of Foreign Affairs.

On 9 January 2018, he was appointed Minister of Foreign Affairs in the government of Mateusz Morawiecki. He resigned on 20 August 2020 ahead of a cabinet reshuffle. Zbigniew Rau took over the charge of the foreign Minister from him on 26 August.

== Selected publications ==
- System czy nieład? Bezpieczeństwo europejskie u progu XXI wieku [System or disorder? European security at the threshold of the 21st century], 1998.
- Teorie stosunków międzynarodowych: krytyka i systematyzacja [Theories of International Relations: critique and systematization], 2007.
- Bezpieczeństwo międzynarodowe. Współczesne koncepcje [International security. Contemporary concepts], 2012.
- International Relations in Poland. 25 Years After the Transition to Democracy (co-author), 2017.
- The Importance of the Helsinki Process for the Opposition in Central and Eastern Europe and the Western Peace Movements in the 1980s (co-author), 2018.
- Teorie integracji europejskiej [Theories of European Integration], 2018.

== See also ==
- List of foreign ministers in 2017
- List of current foreign ministers

Political offices
Preceded by Witold Waszczykowski	Minister of Foreign Affairs; 2018–2020	Succeeded by Zbigniew Rau
