= University of Łódź Faculty of International and Political Studies =

Coordinates: 51.7715°N 19.4722°E

Faculty of International and Political Studies University of Łódź
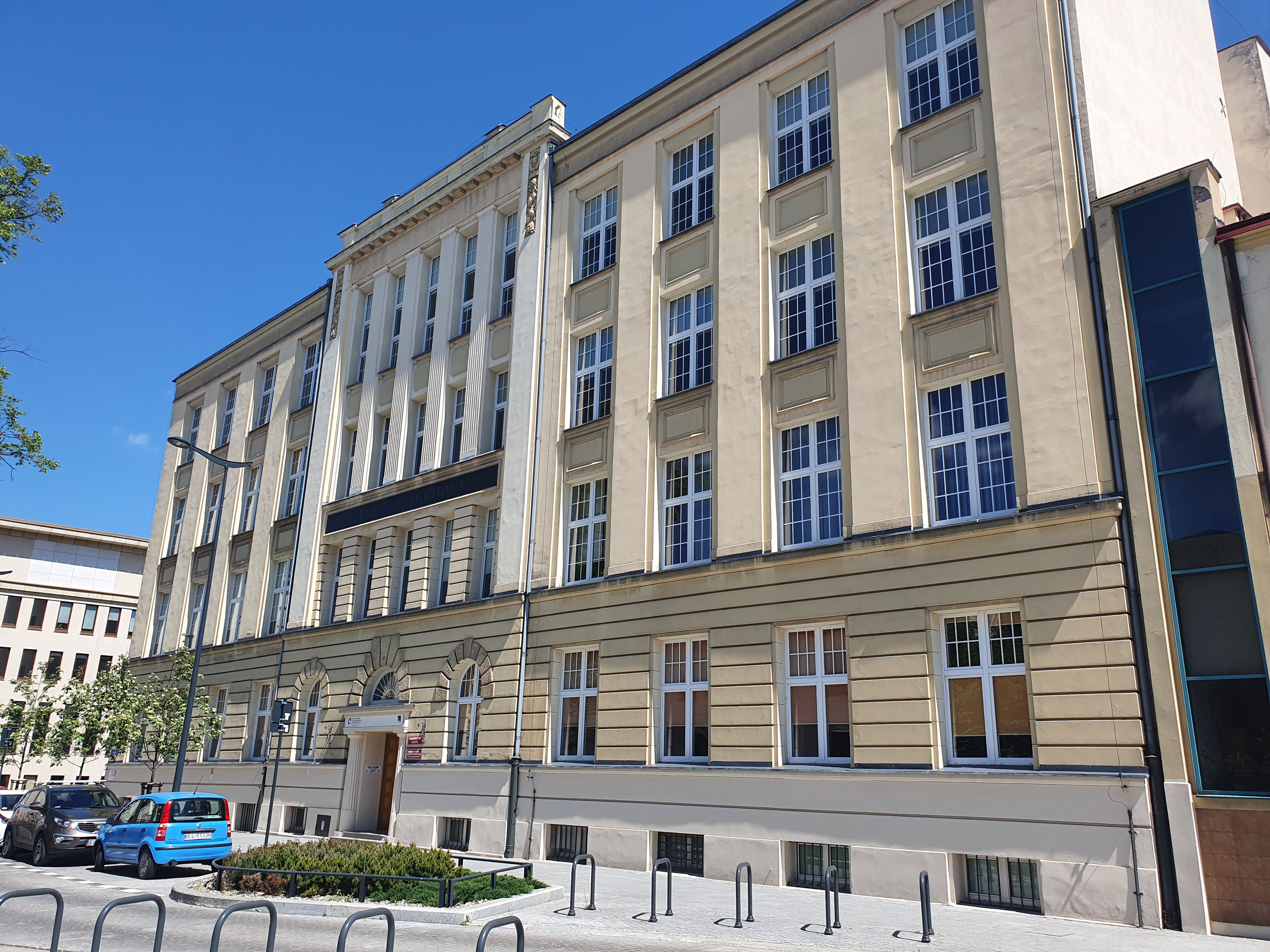
- Established: 1 September 2000
- Dean: prof. Tomasz Domański, Ph.D.
- Location: ul. Składowa 43 Łódź, Poland
- Website: Official website (en)

Faculty of International and Political Studies at the University of Łódź was established on 1 September 2000. The Faculty has the first research category. In the Polish context it implies the highest quality of conducted research which is both interdisciplinary and internationalized. It is interdisciplinary because it combines various disciplines in the field of international and political studies. Additionally, studies at the Faculty of International and Political Studies combine scientific achievements of the humanities, social and economic sciences, including marketing and management, and political science. International cultural studies, focussing on diverse geographical areas and selected cultural problems of international significance, are also of high importance.

== Quality of teaching ==
- In both 2011 and 2012 the faculty won in the regional (Łódź Voivodeship) editions of all-Poland contest Studencki Nobel (Academic Nobel). The laureate was Paweł Rogaliński, a student of political science and management, who won both regional editions of the contest and became one of the very best academic students in Poland.

== Authorities ==
- Dean of the International and Political Studies Faculty - Professor Tomasz Domański
- Associate Dean in charge of Research and International Affairs - Professor Krystyna Kujawińska Courtney
- Associate Dean in charge of Teaching and Learning - Professor Małgorzata Pietrasiak
- Associate Dean in charge of Students’ Affairs - dr Katarzyna Dośpiał-Borysiak
