= University of Łódź =

Public research university in Łódź, Poland

Coordinates: 51°46′18″N 19°28′23″E

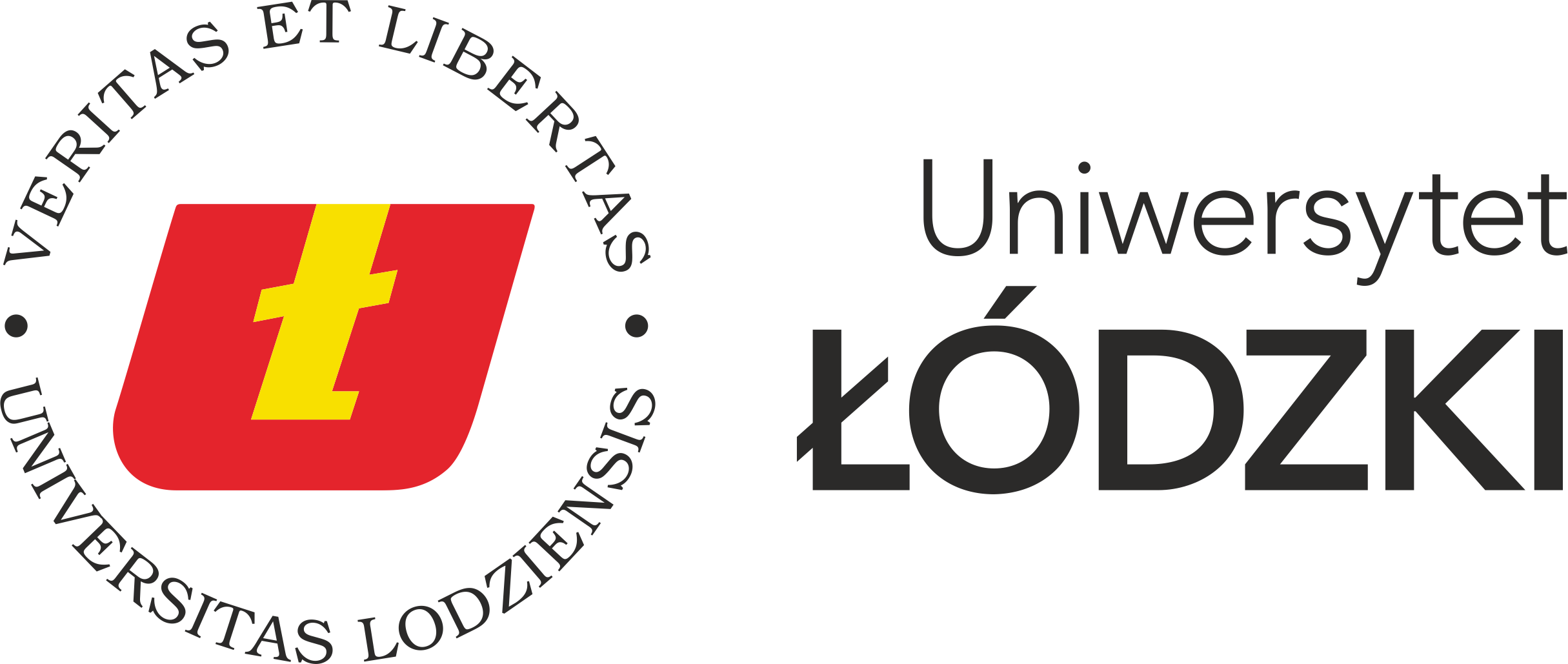
- Latin: Universitas Lodziensis
- Motto: Veritas et libertas
- Motto in English: Truth and freedom
- Type: Public
- Established: May 24, 1945; 81 years ago
- Affiliations: Campus Europae, SOCRATES/ERASMUS, TEMPUS, INCO-COPERNICUS, ACE, Jean Monnet, CEEPUS, EUA, AESOP
- Rector: Prof. dr hab. Rafał Matera, Ph.D.
- Students: 23,188 (12.2023)
- Location: ul. Gabriela Narutowicza 68; 90-136, Łódź, Poland
- Colours: Red
- Website: (Polish), (English), (Chinese), (Russian), (Ukrainian)
- Building details
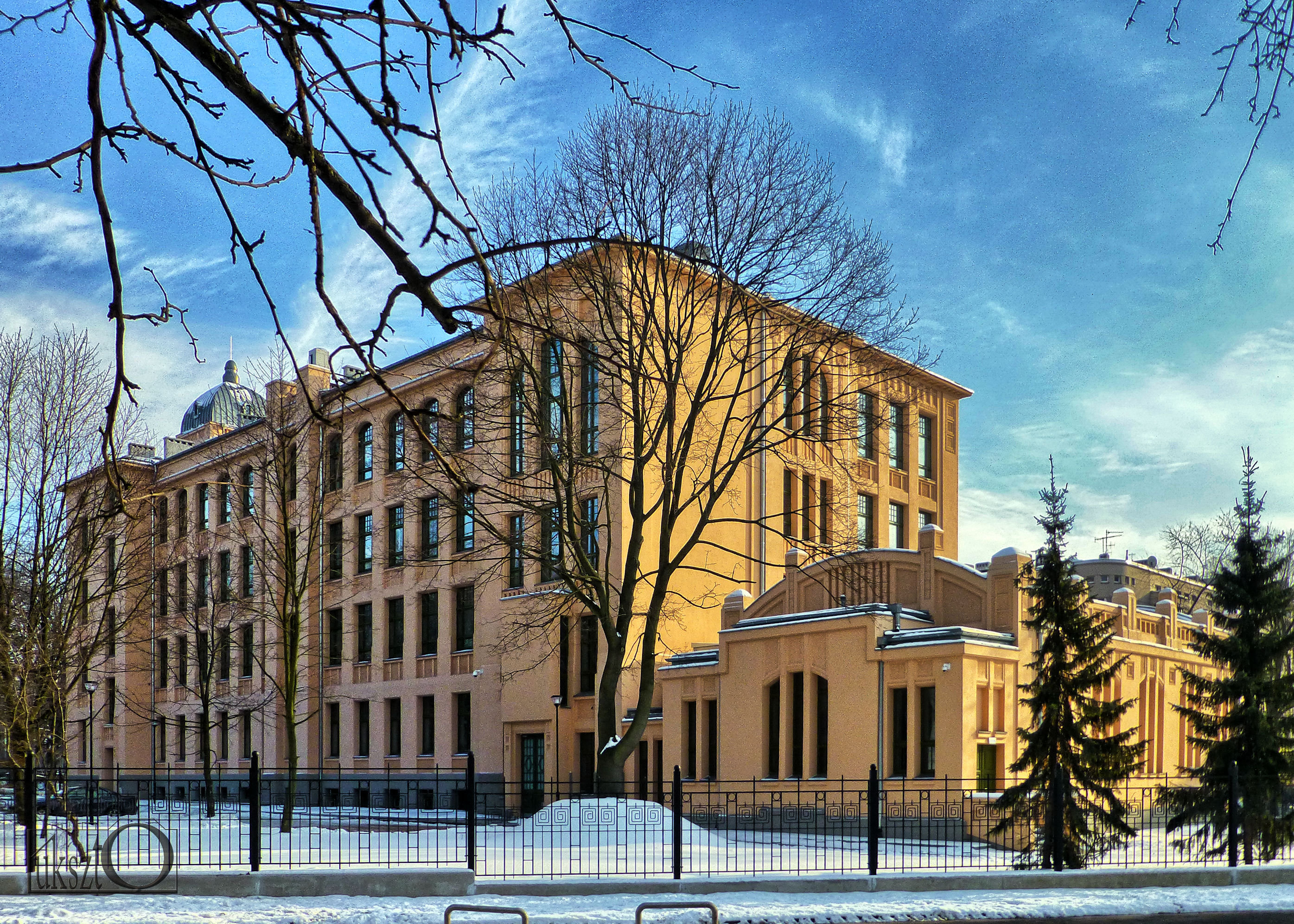

University rankings

Global – Overall
- QS World: 951-1000 (2026)

Regional – Overall
- QS Emerging Europe and Central Asia: 76 (2022)

The University of Łódź (Polish: Uniwersytet Łódzki, Latin: Universitas Lodziensis) is a public research university founded in 1945 in Łódź, Poland, as a continuation of three higher education institutions functioning in Łódź in the interwar period — the Teacher Training Institute (1921–1928), the Higher School of Social and Economic Sciences (1924–1928) and the local division of the Free Polish University of Warsaw (1928–1939).

The University of Łódź is a fully accredited, state-owned, traditional university. It is one of 18 institutions of its type in Poland.

It has more than 25,000 students and 2,600 teachers. Its international cooperation includes 385 partner institutions from all over the world. A range of BA, MA, and postgraduate courses held in English as a language of instruction are offered to Polish and overseas students.

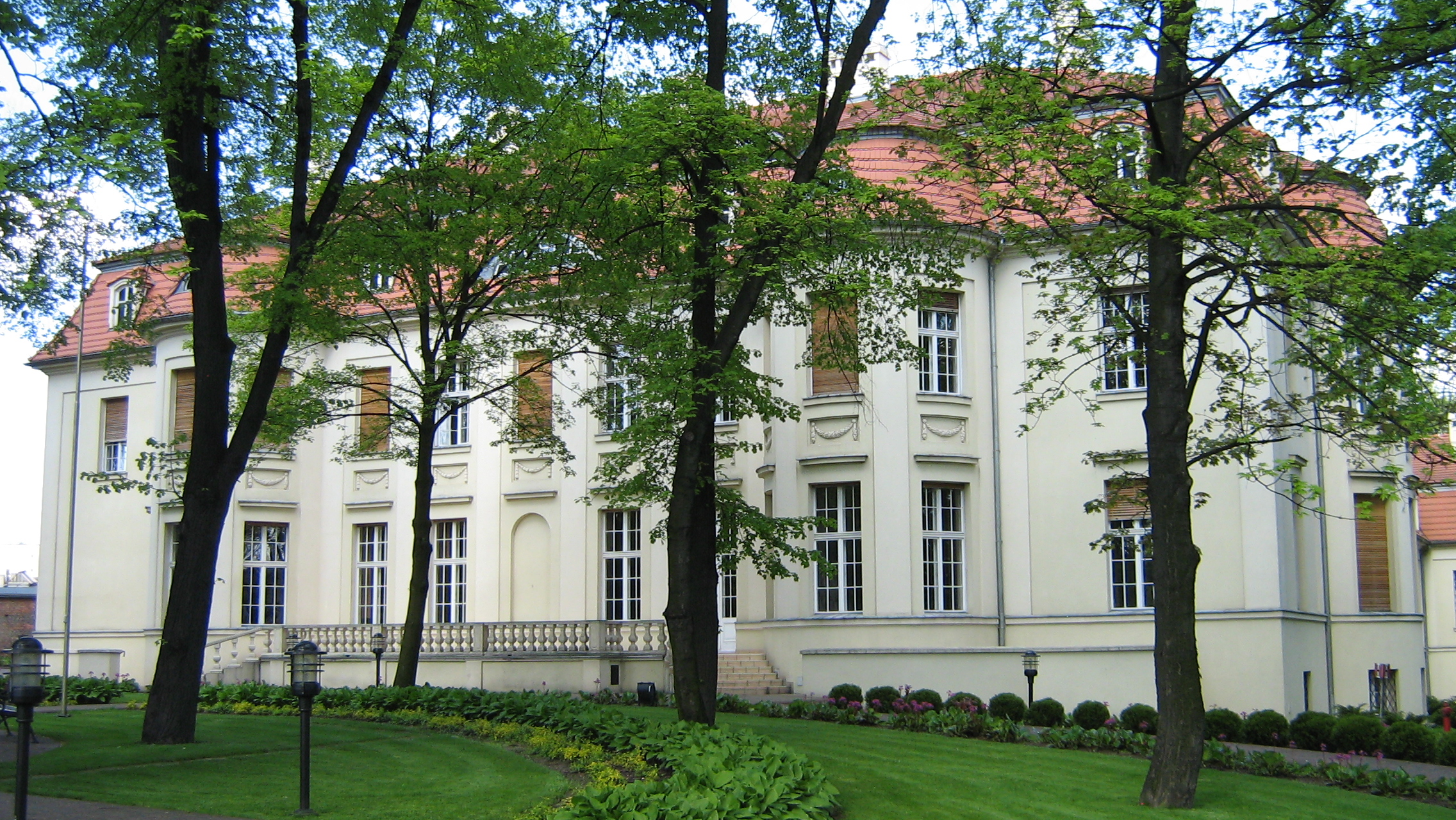
Alfred Biedermann's Palace, seat of the Institute of Contemporary Culture, University of Łódź

== Rankings ==
University rankings

Global – Overall
- QS World: 801-1000 (2022)
- THE World: 1001+ (2020)

The university strives to maintain its high academics standards, the most recent testimonies of which include: 3rd place among Polish universities for the quality of instruction in Economic Sciences, as shown in the 2011 ranking by the Gazeta Bankowa (a respected Polish finance & banking newspaper); 2nd place among Polish universities for qualifying future lawyers, such as legal counsels, and civil law notaries, as shown in the 2010 ranking by the Polish Ministry of Justice; and 4th place among Polish higher education institutions of international prestige, as concluded from the outcomes of QS and Webometrics rankings of 2010.

== Library ==
The library of the University of Łódź is one of the biggest and most modern academic libraries in Central Europe. Its total collection amounts to 3 million volumes. The main part of the book collection is in library store-rooms. The remaining books and journals are placed in the reference sections: the Main Reading Room and Study Rooms. Registered users can use self checkout machines for lending and returning books in some collections. Apart from the Main University Library there are 106 branch libraries and their collections are adjusted to the scientific and didactic activities of the institutions. The number of registered library card holders is now over 20,000.

== International cooperation ==
As a result of widespread cooperation with universities all over the world, including Université Jean Moulin Lyon 3, Université François – Rabelais (Tours), University of Texas at Austin, Westfälische Wilhelms – Universität Münster, University of Baltimore, the R. H. Smith School of Business, University of Maryland, Centria University of Applied Sciences (Kokkola, Finland), and Towson University, students of the university can graduate with dual diplomas.

== Authorities ==
Current term (2016–2020):

- Rector of the University of Łódź (President) – Prof. Elżbieta Żądzińska
- Vice-Rector for International Co-operation – Prof. Łukasz Bogucki
- Vice-Rector for Scientific Research – Prof. Zbigniew Kmieciak
- Vice-Rector for Student Affairs – dr hab. Robert Zakrzewski, prof. UŁ
- Vice-Rector for External Relations – dr hab. Agnieszka Kurczewska, prof. UŁ

== Rector ==
1. Tadeusz Kotarbiński – 1945-1949
2. Józef Chałasiński – 1949-1952
3. Jan Szczepański – 1952-1956
4. Adam Szpunar – 1956-1962
5. Stefan Hrabec – 1962-1965
6. Józef Stanisław Piątowski – 1965-1968
7. Andrzej Nadolski – 1968-1969
8. Zdzisław Skwarczyński – 1969-1972
9. Janusz Górski – 1972-1975
10. Romuald Skowroński – 1975-1981
11. Jerzy Wróblewski – 1981-1984
12. Leszek Wojtczak – 1984-1990
13. Michał Seweryński – 1990-1996
14. Stanisław Liszewski – 1996-2002
15. Wiesław Puś – 2002-2008
16. Włodzimierz Nykiel – 2008-2016
17. Antoni Różalski – 2016-2020
18. Elżbieta Żądzińska – 2020-2024
19. Rafał Matera – 2024-2028

== Faculties ==
Name	Foundation	Colours
Biology and Environmental Protection	2001	Olive
Chemistry	2007	Cyan
Economics and Sociology	1965	Magenta
Philology	1952	Navy
Philosophy and History	1952	Teal Green
Physics and Applied Informatics	2007	Brown
Mathematics and Computer Science	2007	Teal
Geographical Sciences	2001	Green
Educational Sciences	1991	Yellow
Law and Administration	1945	Crimson
Management	1994	Blue
International and Political Studies	2000	Azure

== Notable alumni ==
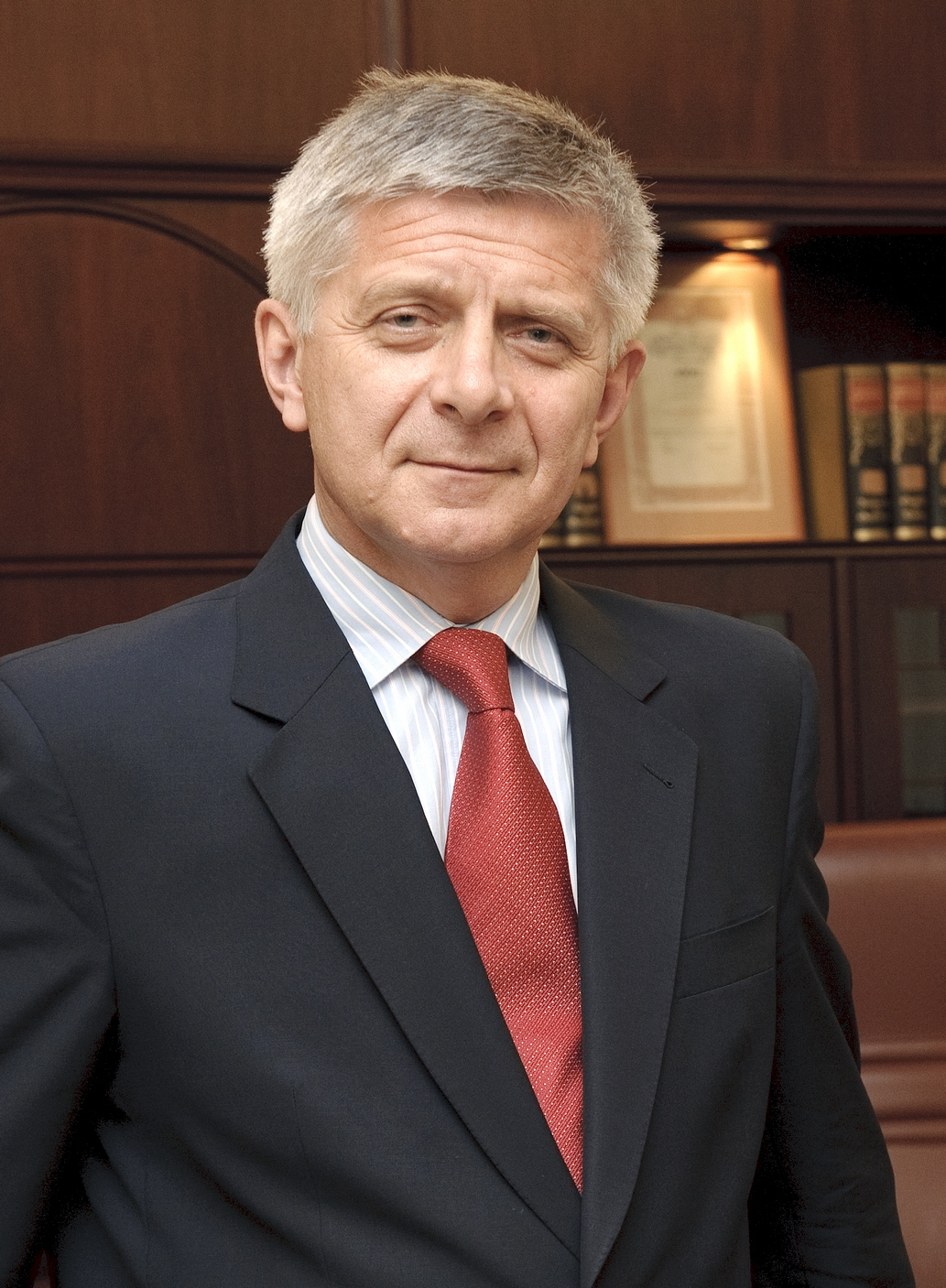
Marek Belka, professor of economics, former Prime Minister and former head of National Bank of Poland

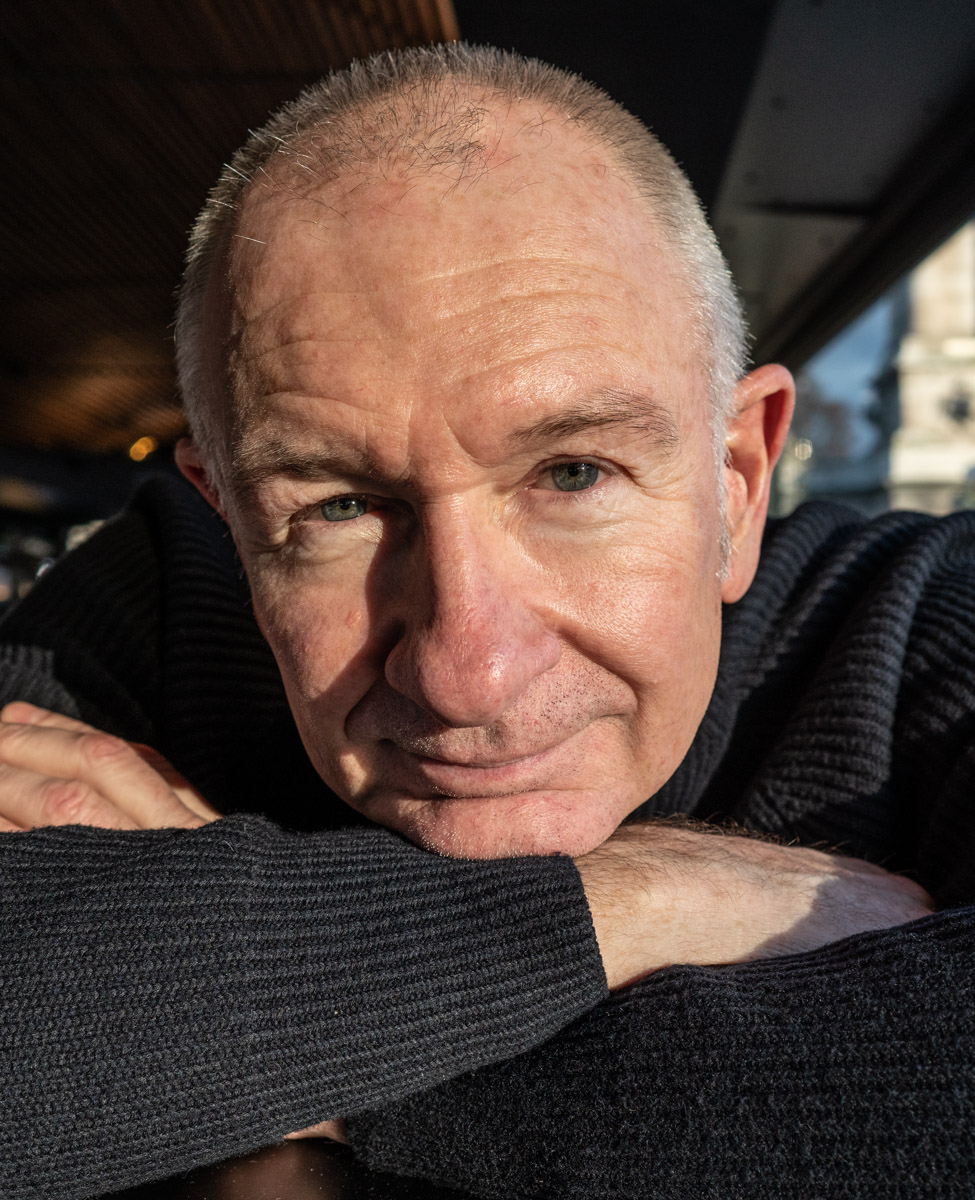
Paweł Edelman, cinematographer, nominated for an Academy Award and a BAFTA Award, won the César Award for Best Cinematography

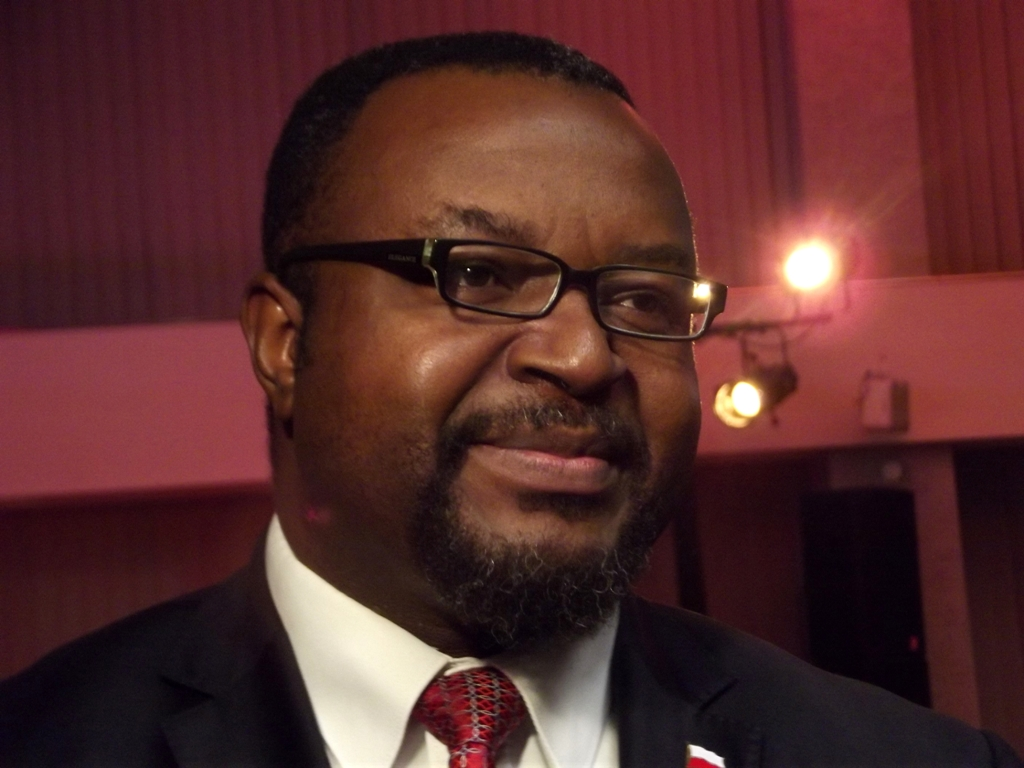
John Onyekwere Godson, first black Member of the Parliament of Poland

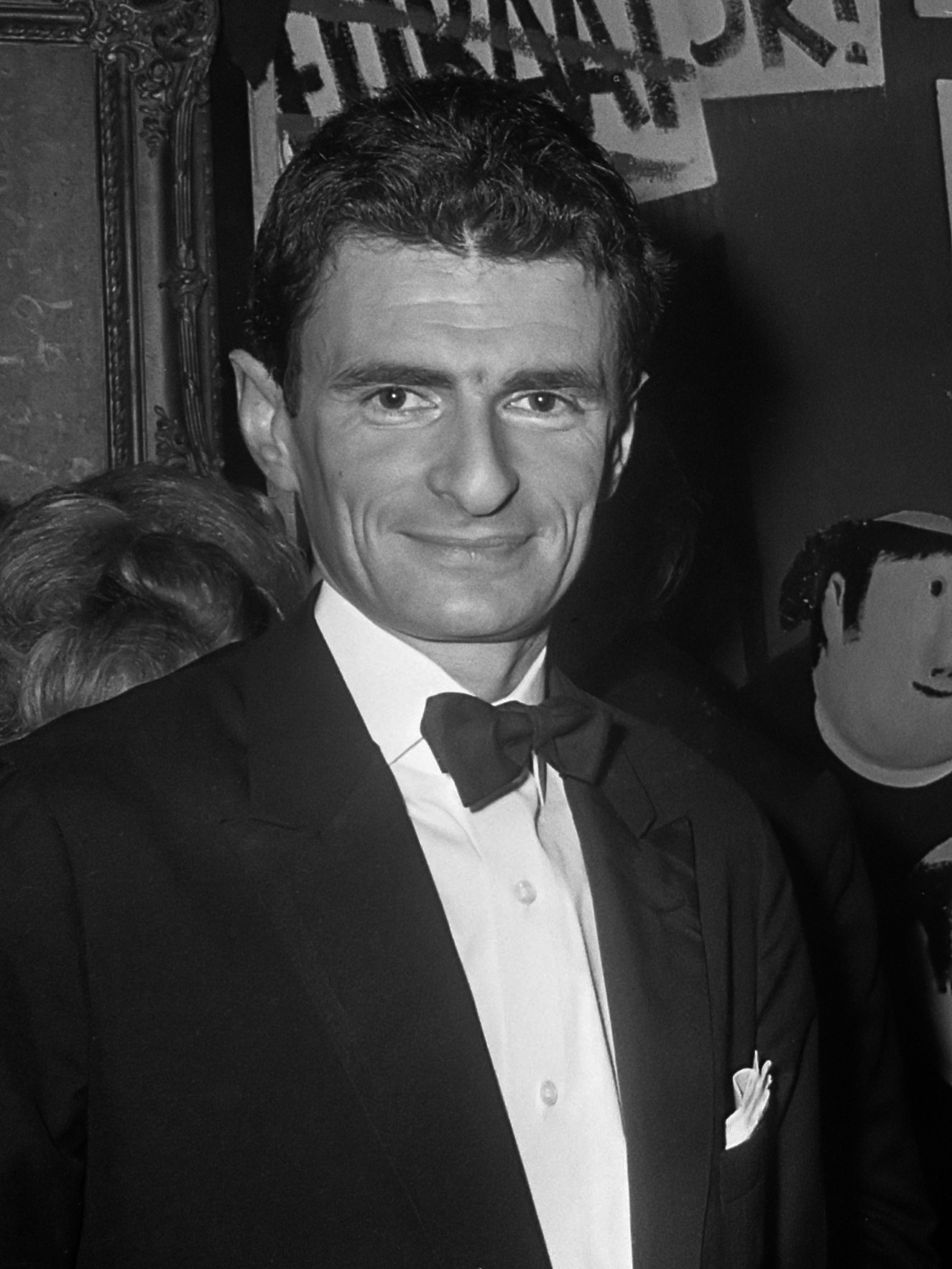
Jerzy Kosiński, novelist and President of the American Chapter of P.E.N., known for novels The Painted Bird and Being There

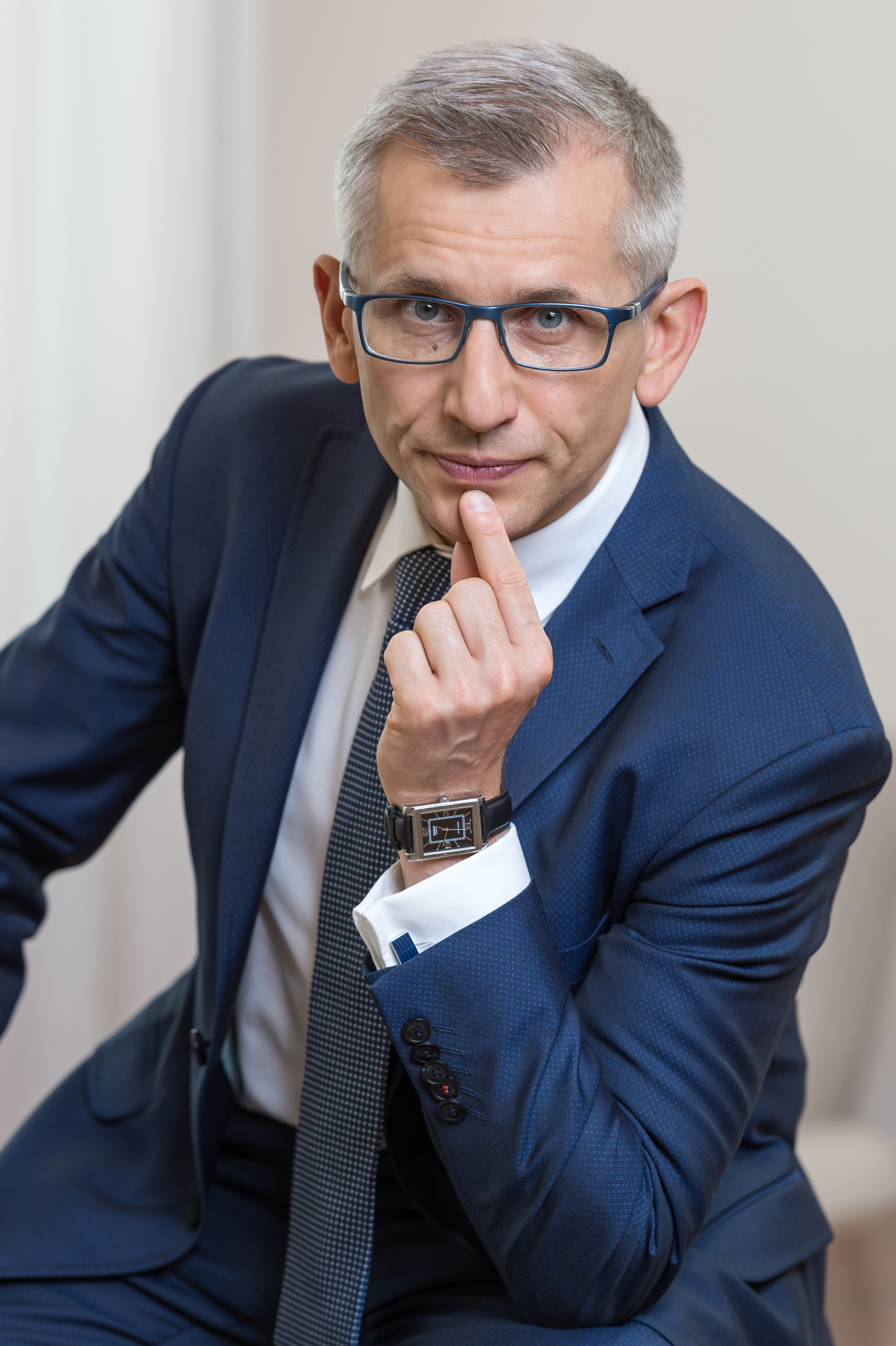
Krzysztof Kwiatkowski, politician, former Minister of Justice of Poland and President of the Supreme Audit Office

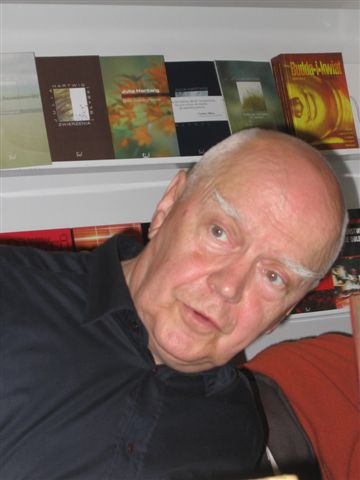
Jarosław Marek Rymkiewicz, poet, essayist, dramatist and literary critic, 2003 Nike Award winner

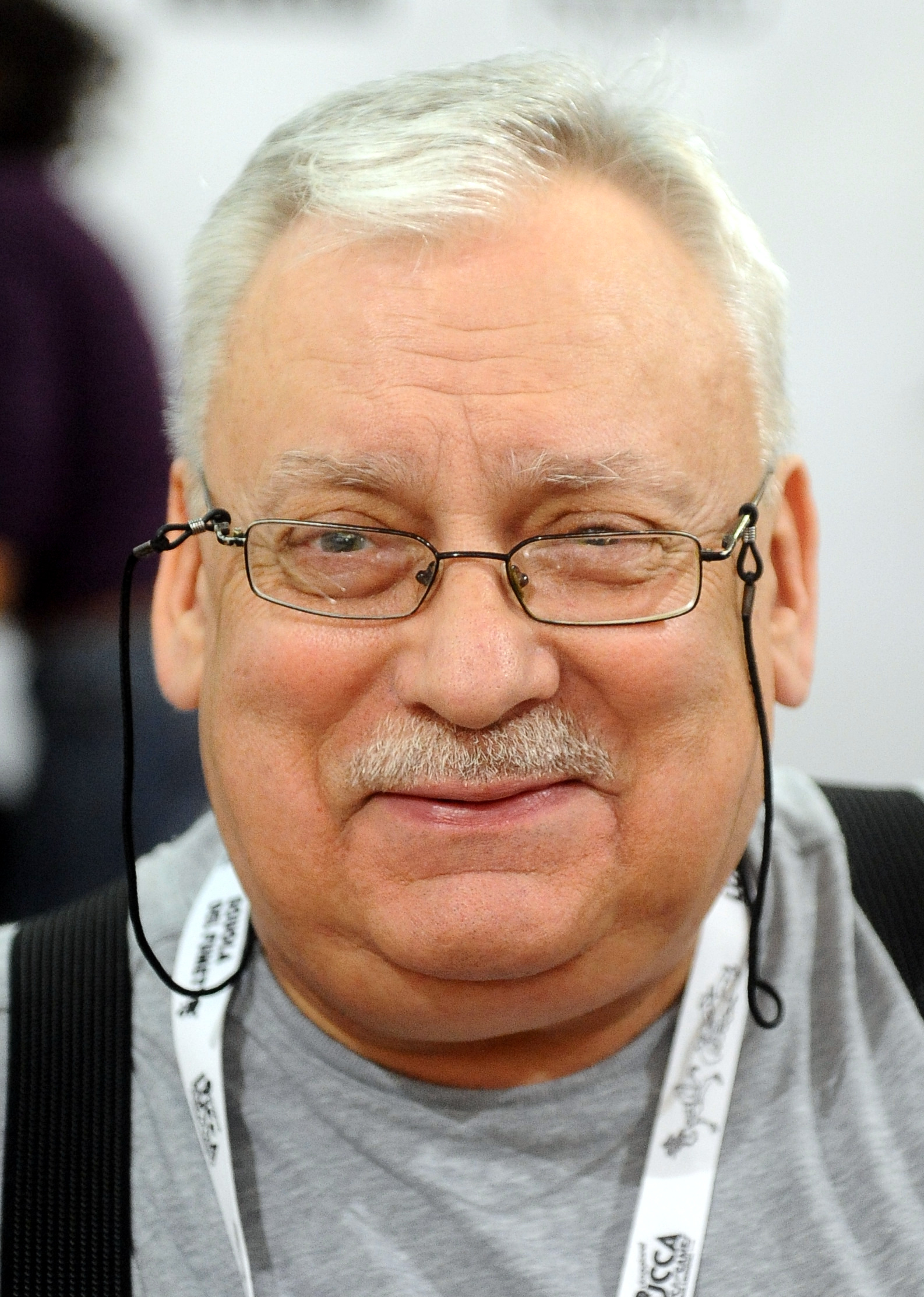
Andrzej Sapkowski, fantasy writer, best known for his book series, The Witcher

Other notable alumni include:

- Alicja Derkowska (born 1940), Polish educator and political activist
- Cezary Grabarczyk (born 1960), politician, former Minister of Infrastructure
- Jerzy Jarniewicz (born 1958), poet, literary critic, translator and essayist, winner of the 2022 Nike Award
- Antonina Kłoskowska (1919–2001), sociologist, member of the Polish Academy of Sciences (PAN), president of the Polish Sociological Association
- Jerzy Kropiwnicki (born 1945), right-wing politician, former mayor of Łódź
- Tatiana Okupnik (born 1978), singer, composer and songwriter, former member of Blue Café
- Władysław Pasikowski (born 1959), film director and screenwriter, known for movies Pigs, Aftermath, Jack Strong, Operacja Samum
- Karolina Pawliczak (born 1976), lawyer and politician
- Jacek Saryusz-Wolski (born 1948), diplomat, politician and an MEP: member of the European Parliament (elected on 13 June 2004)
- Krzysztof Skiba (born 1964), musician, singer-songwriter, satirist, essayist and actor; member of the rock band Big Cyc
- Joanna Skrzydlewska (born 1977), politician and a Member of the European Parliament
- Magdalena Śniadecka-Kotarska (born 1952), ethno-political researcher and diplomat (Ambassador of Poland to Peru)
- Piotr Trzaskalski (born 1964), film director and screenwriter, known for movies Edi, My Father's Bike
- Marcin Tybura (born 1985), professional Mixed Martial Artist, current UFC Heavyweight
- Anita Werner (born 1978), television journalist, and former actress
- Istvan Vizvary, Polish science fiction writer
- Janusz Wojciechowski (born 1958), politician and a Member of the European Parliament and an EU Commissioner for Agriculture
- Aleksandra Ziolkowska-Boehm (born 1949), writer, author of biographic books
- Phạm Thị Trân Châu (born 1938) Vietnamese biochemist and former politician.

== Other units ==
- Alexis de Tocqueville Center for Political and Legal Thought
- The School of Polish for Foreigners - first school of Polish for foreigners in Poland, since 1952
- Branch in Tomaszów Mazowiecki

== Origins ==
The university was created after the total destruction of Warsaw, during and after the Warsaw Uprising, and after the expulsion of Poles from Lviv. One of its leading founders was Professor Teodor Vieweger of the Free Polish University. During the first year of operation (1945-1946 academic year), the University of Łódź admitted over 7 thousand students and it was divided into 6 Faculties (including the schools of pharmacy, medicine and odontology that formed a separate institution in 1950), which were later divided into the present 12 Faculties. In 1998, a branch campus of the University of Łódź was created in Tomaszów Mazowiecki.

== Gallery ==
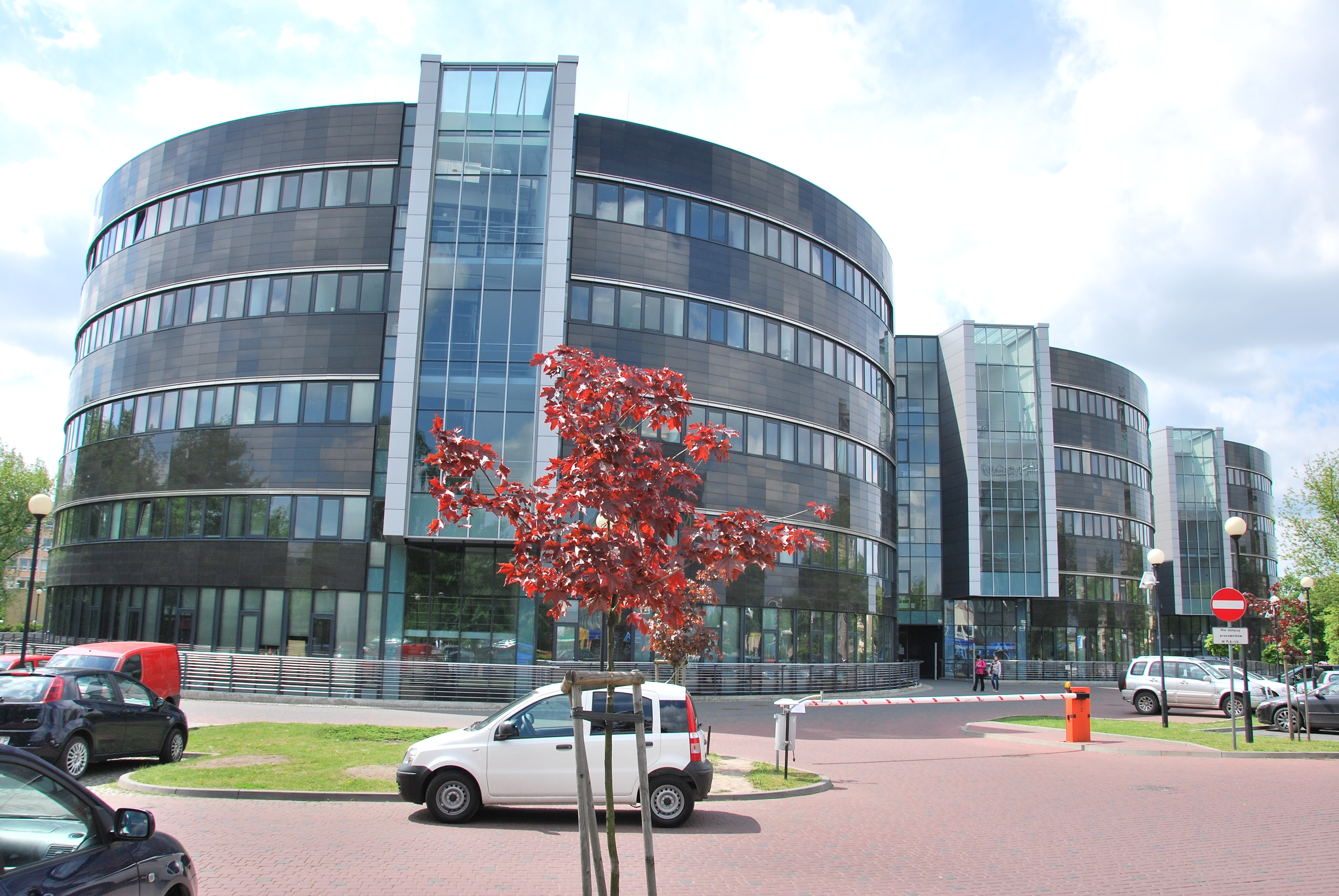
Faculty of Law and Administration

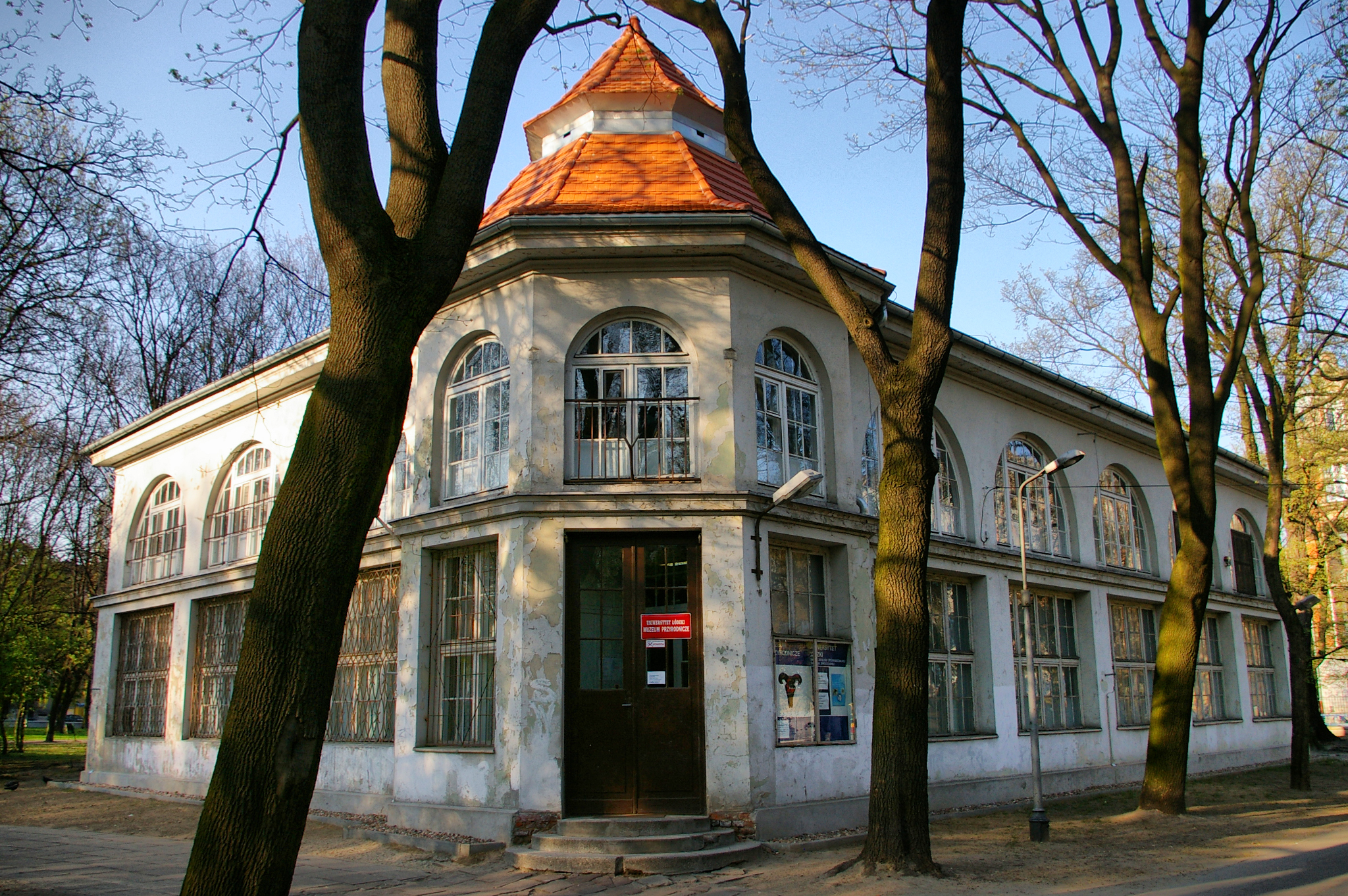
The UŁ Museum of Natural History

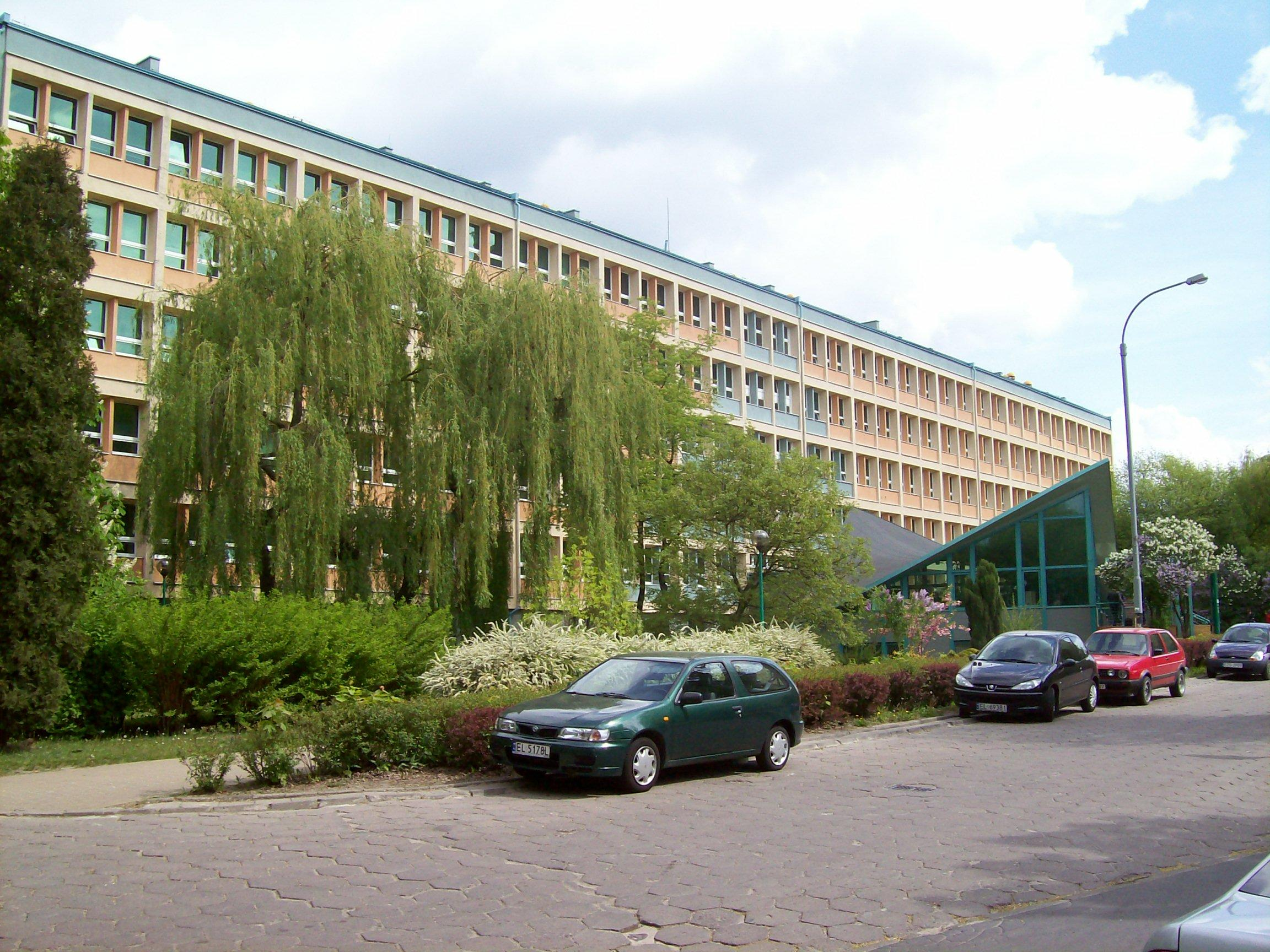
Faculty of Biology and Environmental Protection

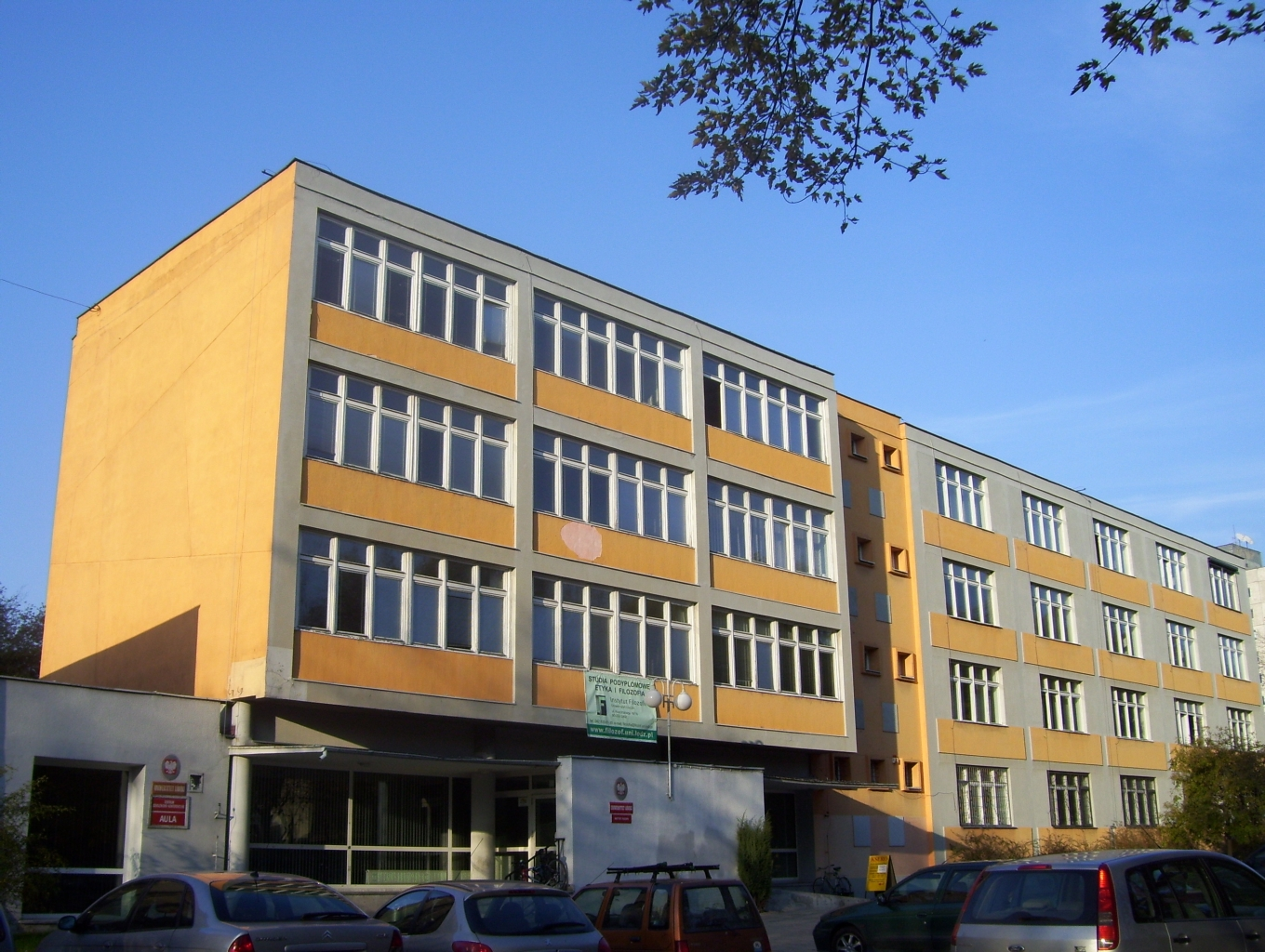
Faculty of Philosophy and History

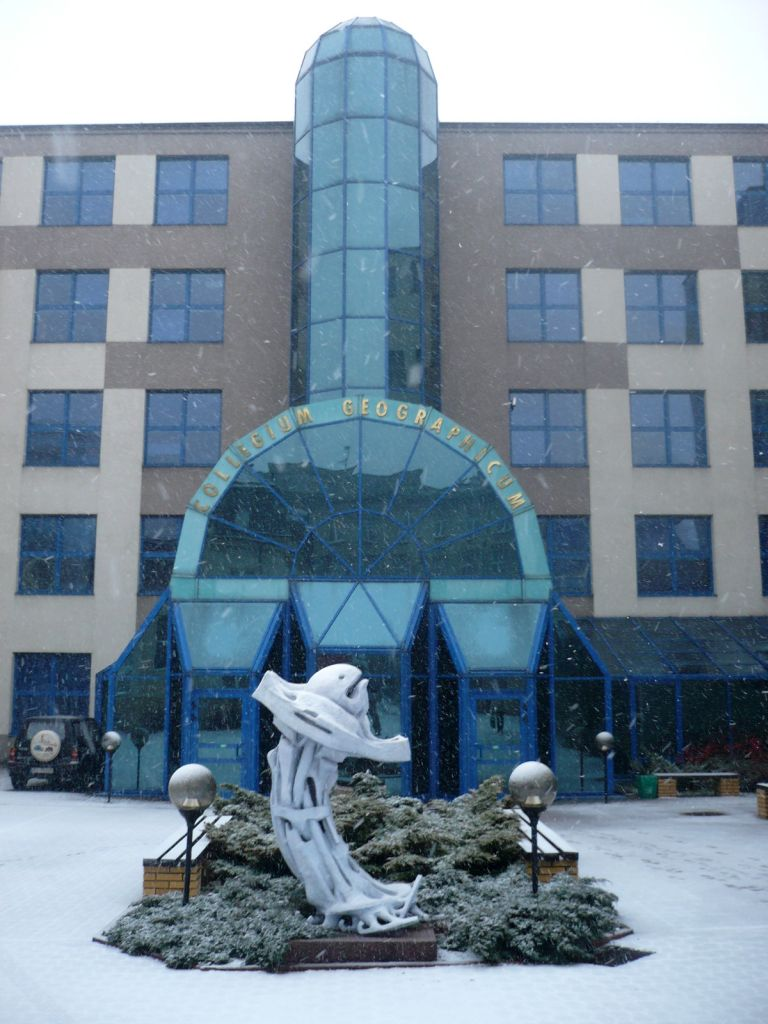
Faculty of Geographical Sciences

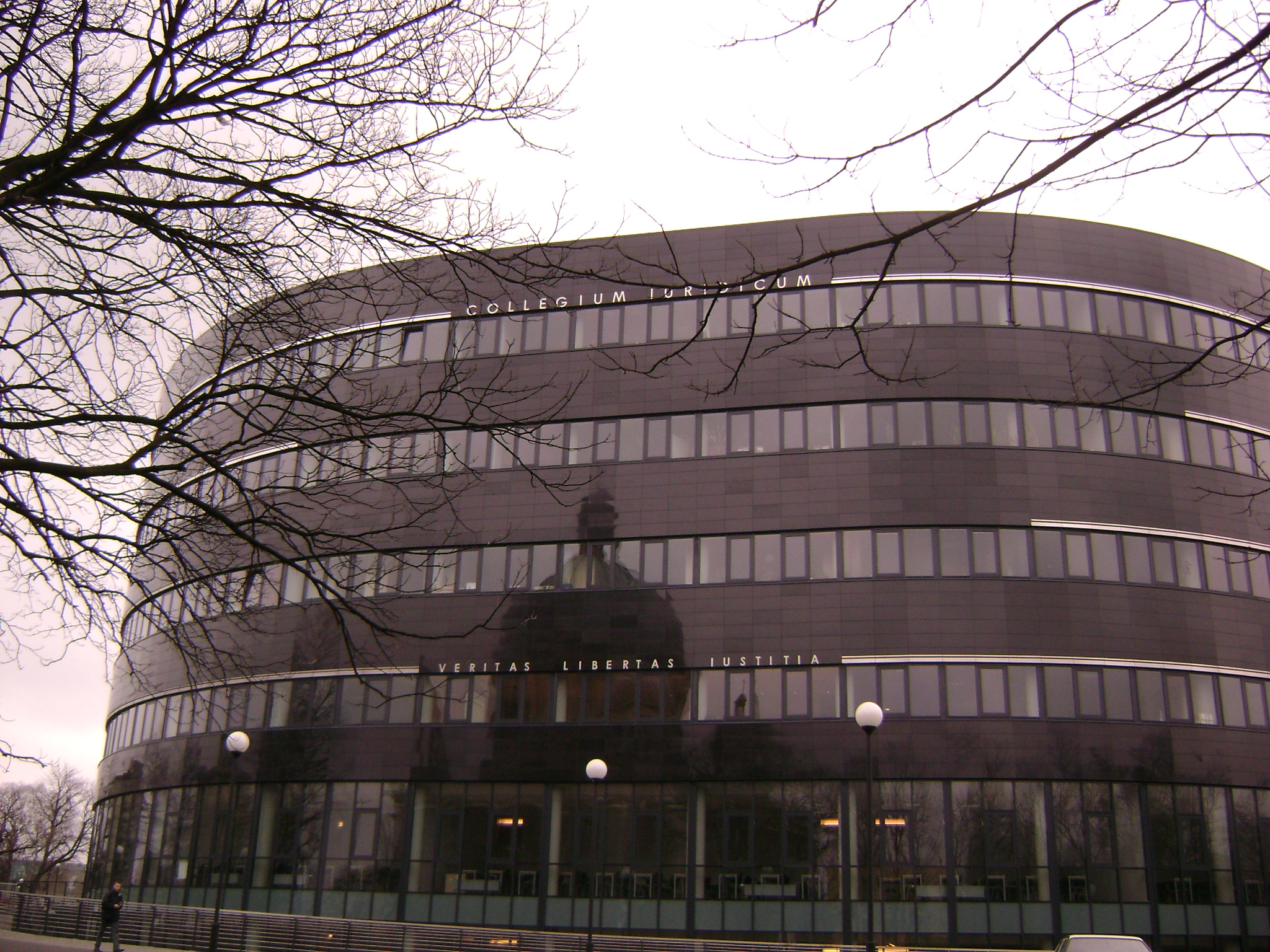
Faculty of Law and Administration

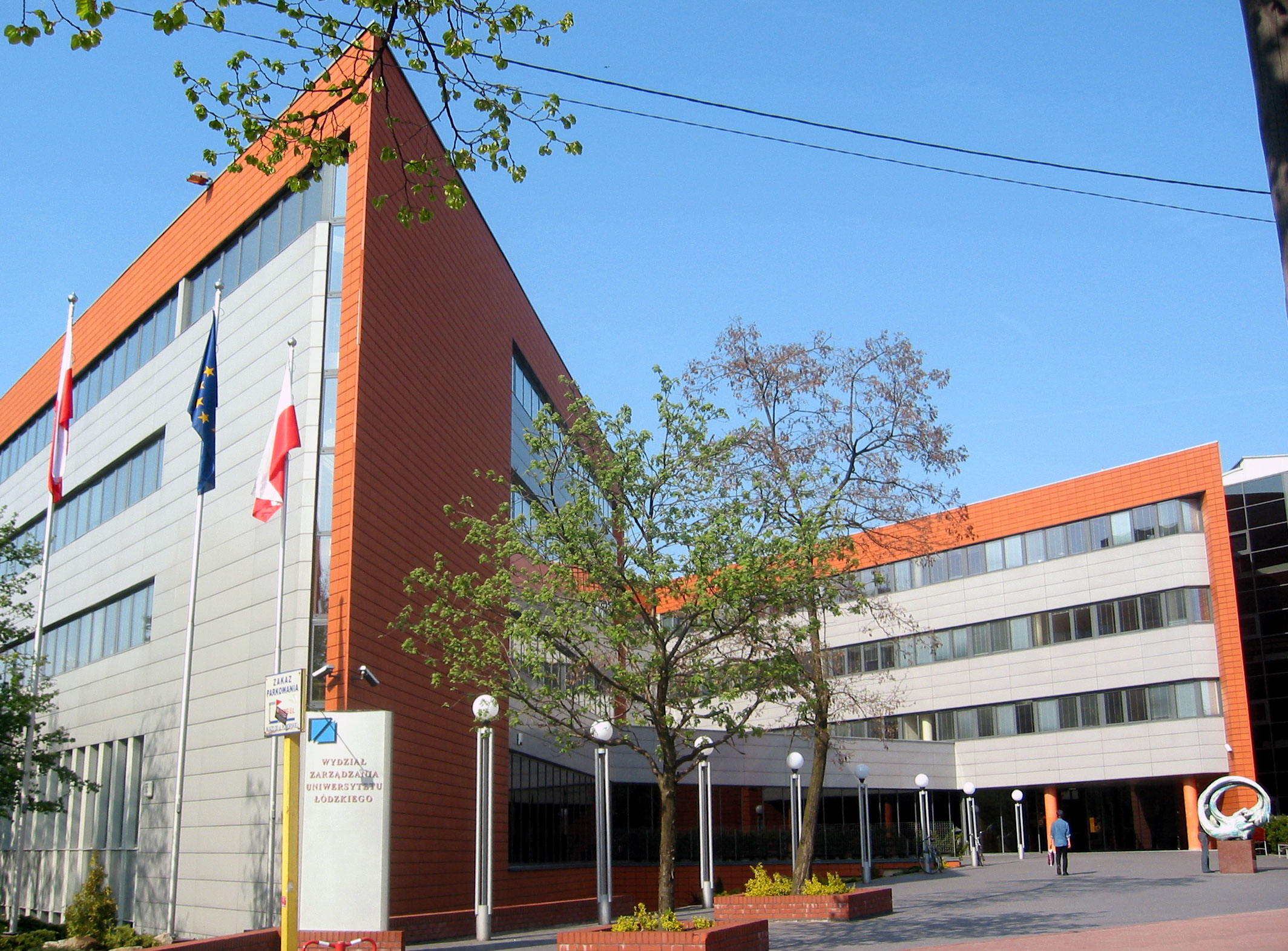
Faculty of Management

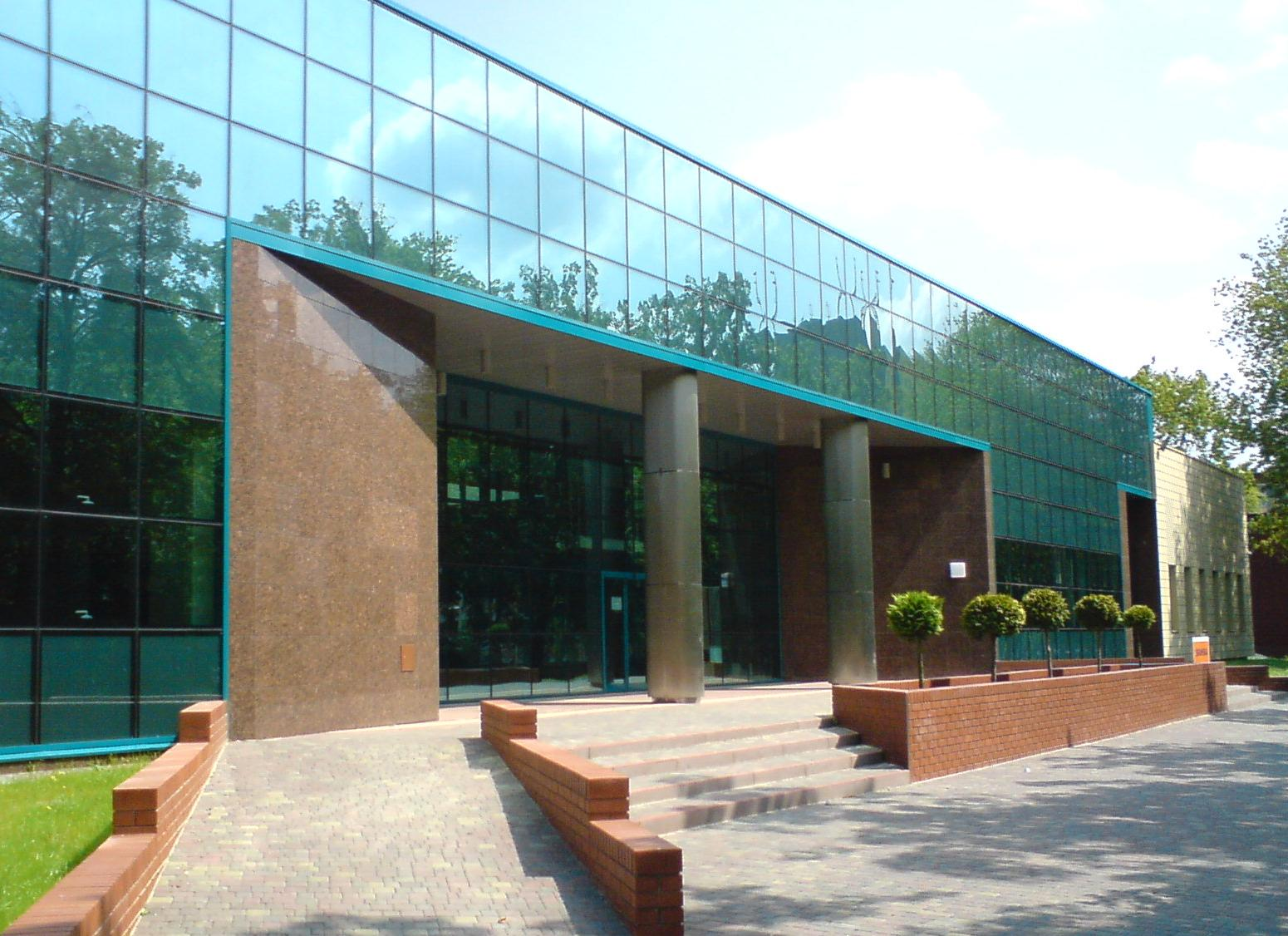
Faculty of Biology and Environmental Protection
